= List of shipwrecks in 1811 =

The list of shipwrecks in 1811 includes ships sunk, wrecked or otherwise lost during 1811.

table of contents
1811
Jan	Feb	Mar	Apr
May	Jun	Jul	Aug
Sep	Oct	Nov	Dec
Unknown date

== January ==
=== 1 January ===
List of shipwrecks: 1 January 1811
Ship	State	Description
Arcade	United Kingdom	The ship was driven ashore in the Isles of Scilly. She was later refloated. Arcade was on a voyage from Bristol, Gloucestershire to Falmouth, Cornwall and Jamaica.
Uncle Toby	United Kingdom	The ship was abandoned by her crew, who were rescued by Marquis of Kildare (United Kingdom). She was on a voyage from Suriname to London.

=== 2 January ===
List of shipwrecks: 2 January 1811
Ship	State	Description
Isabella and Ann	United Kingdom	The ship was driven ashore and severely damaged in the Isles of Scilly. She was on a voyage from Cádiz, Spain to Bristol, Gloucestershire. The ship was later refloated.
Martha	(United Kingdom of Great Britain and Ireland) Guernsey	The ship was lost near Tarragona, Spain. Her crew were rescued.

=== 3 January ===
List of shipwrecks: 3 January 1811
Ship	State	Description
Elizabeth and Sarah	United Kingdom	The ship was driven ashore at Great Yarmouth, Norfolk.

=== 4 January ===
List of shipwrecks: 4 January 1811
Ship	State	Description
Allen	United Kingdom	The ship was wrecked near Westport, County Mayo. She was on a voyage from the Azores to Liverpool, Lancashire.
Brothers	United Kingdom	The transport ship, a brig, was driven ashore and wrecked at Deal, Kent.
Dorsetshire	United Kingdom	The ship was driven onto the Blyth Sand. She was refloated on 8 January.

=== 5 January ===
List of shipwrecks: 5 January 1811
Ship	State	Description
Brothers	United Kingdom	The transport ship, a brig, was driven ashore and wrecked at Deal, Kent.
Dove	United Kingdom	The packet ship foundered in the Irish Sea with the loss of all but two of those on board. She was on a voyage from Bristol, Gloucestershire to Waterford.
Highlander	United Kingdom	The ship was driven ashore at Weymouth, Dorset. She was refloated on 21 January and taken in to Weymouth.
James and Euphan	United Kingdom	The sloop foundered in the North Sea whilst on a voyage from Berwick-upon-Tweed, Northumberland to Leith, Lothian. Her crew were rescued.
Joseph	United Kingdom	The ship was driven ashore near Ross. Her crew were rescued.
José Fortuna	Portugal	The ship sank at Dover, Kent.
Ranger	United Kingdom	The transport ship, a brig, was driven ashore and wrecked at Dover.
Resource	United Kingdom	The ship was driven ashore and wrecked at Westgate-on-Sea, Kent. Her crew were rescued. She was on a voyage from Valencia, Spain to London.
Unnamed	(France) French First Republic	The ship was drive ashore and wrecked near Westgate-on-Sea with the loss of all hands.
Unnamed	United Kingdom	The ship foundered in the English Channel 5 nautical miles (9.3 km) off Folkestone, Kent with the loss of all hands.
Unnamed	United Kingdom	The sloop foundered off Cara, County Wexford with the loss of all hads.

=== 6 January ===
List of shipwrecks: 6 January 1811
Ship	State	Description
HMS Attack	Royal Navy	The Archer-class gun-brig was driven ashore at Great Yarmouth, Norfolk. She was later refloated.
HMS Bold	Royal Navy	The Archer-class gun-brig was driven ashore at Great Yarmouth. Her crew were rescued. She was later refloated, but was subsequently broken up in April 1811 at Sheerness, Kent.
Boyne	United Kingdom	The ship foundered in the North Sea off Cromer, Norfolk. She was on a voyage from Sweden to Portsmouth, Hampshire.
Gabriel	Flag unknown	The galiot was driven ashore at Great Yarmouth.
Hope	United Kingdom	The ship was driven ashore at Great Yarmouth.
Priscilla	United Kingdom	Napoleonic Wars: The brig was captured and burnt in the Atlantic Ocean (47°40′N 15°20′W) by the privateer Invincible Bonaparte (France). Priscilla was on a voyage from Malta to London.
Providence	United Kingdom	The ship was driven ashore at Great YarMouth.
Susan, or Susanna	United Kingdom	The ship was driven ashore at Great Yarmouth. She was later refloated.

=== 9 January ===
List of shipwrecks: 9 January 1811
Ship	State	Description
Jason	United Kingdom	The ship suffered an onboard explosion and sank in The Wash off Boston, Lincolnshire.
New Astley	United Kingdom	The ship was driven ashore at Great Yarmouth, Norfolk. Her crew were rescued. She was on a voyage from London to Great Yarmouth. She was refloated and taken in to Great Yarmouth.

=== 10 January ===
List of shipwrecks: 10 January 1811
Ship	State	Description
Bess	United Kingdom	The ship foundered in the Irish Sea off the Isle of Man. Five of her crew were rescued. She was on a voyage from Liverpool, Lancashire to Waterford.

=== 11 January ===
List of shipwrecks: 11 January 1811
Ship	State	Description
Emelia	United Kingdom	The ship was wrecked at Rathmullan, County Donegal. Her crew were rescued. She was on a voyage from Philadelphia, Pennsylvania, United States to Liverpool, Lancashire.

=== 12 January ===
List of shipwrecks: 12 January 1811
Ship	State	Description
Oscar	United Kingdom	The ship was driven ashore at Penzance, Cornwall. She was refloated on 24 January and taken in to Penzance.

=== 13 January ===
List of shipwrecks: 13 January 1811
Ship	State	Description
Brisk	United Kingdom	The ship was driven ashore between Walmer Castle and South Foreland, Kent. She was on a voyage from Smyrna, Ottoman Empire to London.
Brothers	United Kingdom	Napoleonic Wars: The ship was driven ashore at Bexhill-on-Sea, Sussex by a French privateer. Her crew were rescued.
Queenborough	United Kingdom	The ship foundered in the Atlantic Ocean 33 leagues (99 nautical miles (183 km)) off Land's End, Cornwall. Her crew were rescued by Dantzig ( Danzig). Queenborough was of a voyage from São Miguel Island, Azores to London.

=== 15 January ===
List of shipwrecks: 15 January 1811
Ship	State	Description
Philadelphia	United States	The ship was driven ashore and wrecked on Oronsay, Inner Hebrides, United Kingdom. All on board were rescued. Philadelphia was on a voyage from Philadelphia, Pennsylvania to Liverpool, Lancashire, United Kingdom.

=== 16 January ===
List of shipwrecks: 16 January 1811
Ship	State	Description
Jannet	United Kingdom	The sloop was driven ashore and wrecked at Padstow, Cornwall. She was on a voyage from Tenerife, Canary Islands to London.
Pelteisses	United Kingdom	Napoleonic Wars: The ship was captured by the privateer Rodeur (France) whilst on a voyage from Providencia Island to London. She was subsequently wrecked on Belle Île, Morbihan, France. All sixteen people on board were rescued.
Success	United States	The ship was driven ashore at Sandy Hook, New Jersey. She was on a voyage from Saint Croix, Virgin Islands to New York.

=== 17 January ===
List of shipwrecks: 17 January 1811
Ship	State	Description
Paquetto Felix	Portugal	The ship was wrecked on the Saltee Islands, County Wexford, United Kingdom. Her crew were rescued. She was on a voyage from Maranhão to Liverpool, Lancashire, United Kingdom.

=== 18 January ===
List of shipwrecks: 18 January 1811
Ship	State	Description
James Hamilton	United States	The ship was wrecked near Charleston, South Carolina. Her crew were rescued. She was on a voyage from Dartmouth, Devon, United Kingdom to Charleston.
Liberty	United Kingdom	The ship sprang a leak and foundered in the North Sea off Flamborough Head, Yorkshire. Her crew were rescued.

=== 19 January ===
List of shipwrecks: 19 January 1811
Ship	State	Description
Grand Duke	United Kingdom	The ship departed from Jamaica for London. She was later boarded off the Cape Nicola Mole by HMS Daedalus (Royal Navy). No further trace, presumed to have foundered with the loss of all hands.
John Johnson	United States	The ship foundered in the North Sea off Harlingen, Frise, France. She was on a voyage from Baltimore, Maryland to Tönning, Duchy of Schleswig.
Malta	United Kingdom	Napoleonic Wars: The ship was captured off Cape Trafalgar, Spain by a French privateer. She was taken in to Barbate, Spain and burnt.
Success	United Kingdom	The ship foundered in the Atlantic Ocean off Tory Island, County Donegal. Her crew were rescued. She was on a voyage from Greenock, Renfrewshire to Limerick.

=== 20 January ===
List of shipwrecks: 20 January 1811
Ship	State	Description
Alert	United Kingdom	The brigantine ran aground at Aberdeen. She was refloated.
Aurora	United States	The ship was driven ashore in the Clyde. She was refloated on 23 January.
Falkirk	United Kingdom	The ship was driven ashore in the Clyde.
Jubilee	United Kingdom	The ship was driven ashore in the Clyde.
Oak	United Kingdom	The ship was driven ashore in the Clyde.
Peggy	United Kingdom	The ship foundered off Ardrossan, Ayrshire. Her crew were rescued. She was on a voyage from Belfast, County Antrim to Irvine, Ayrshire.
United Kingdom	United Kingdom	The ship was driven ashore in the Clyde. She was refloated on 23 February.
Waterhouse	United Kingdom	The ship was driven ashore in the Clyde.

=== 21 January ===
List of shipwrecks: 21 January 1811
Ship	State	Description
Adventure	United Kingdom	The ship was driven ashore near Crookhaven, County Cork. she was on a voyage from Africa to Bristol, Gloucestershire.
Elizabeth	United Kingdom	The ship was destroyed by fire at Ramsgate, Kent. She was on a voyage from London to Plymouth, Devon.
Leda	United Kingdom	The ship foundered off Algeciras, Spain. Her crew were rescued
Lord Melville	United Kingdom	The ship departed from Jamaica for Cork. No further trace, presumed foundered with the loss of all hands.
Union	United States	The ship was lost in the Caicos Islands. Her crew were rescued. She was on a voyage from Virginia to Jamaica.

=== 23 January ===
List of shipwrecks: 23 January 1811
Ship	State	Description
John	United Kingdom	The ship was lost on the coast of America. Her crew were rescued by Æolus (United Kingdom). John was on a voyage from Belfast, County Antrim to Virginia, United States.

=== 24 January ===
List of shipwrecks: 24 January 1811
Ship	State	Description
Perseverance	United States	The ship capsized at Liverpool, Lancashire, United Kingdom.

=== 25 January ===
List of shipwrecks: 25 January 1811
Ship	State	Description
Resolution	United Kingdom	The ship was driven ashore at Holyhead, Anglesey. She was on a voyage from Waterford to Liverpool, Lancashire.

=== 26 January ===
List of shipwrecks: 26 January 1811
Ship	State	Description
Industrious William & John	United Kingdom	The ship was driven ashore near Whitehaven, Cumberland. She was on a voyage from Strangford, County Down to Liverpool, Lancashire.

=== 28 January ===
List of shipwrecks: 28 January 1811
Ship	State	Description
Leda	United Kingdom	The ship was lost near Algeciras, Spain, Her crew were rescued.

=== 29 January ===
List of shipwrecks: 29 January 1811
Ship	State	Description
Hannah	United Kingdom	The ship was lost near the Isla of Pines, Cuba. She was on a voyage from Jamaica to London.

=== 30 January ===
List of shipwrecks: 30 January 1811
Ship	State	Description
Good Intent	United Kingdom	The sloop was driven ashore and wrecked on the "Isle of Dillas". She was on a voyage from Lancaster, Lancashire to Dublin.
Kitty	United Kingdom	The ship was driven ashore on the Isle of Arran. She was on a voyage from Glasgow, Renfrewshire to Saint Croix, Virgin Islands. Kitty was refloated on 8 February and taken in to the Clyde.
Northumberland	United Kingdom	The ship was driven ashore at Exmouth, Devon. She was on a voyage from Sunderland, County Durham to Exmouth. Northumberland was later refloated.
Pursuit	United Kingdom	The ship was sighted off South Shields, County Durham. No further trace, presumed foundered in the North Sea with the loss of all hands. She was on a voyage from King's Lynn, Norfolk to Leith, Lothian.
Rosetta	United Kingdom	The ship was driven ashore and wrecked at Newlyn, Cornwall.
Susan	United Kingdom	The ship was driven ashore near Cork. She was on a voyage from Cork to Lisbon, Portugal. Susan was later refloated.
Twilight	United Kingdom	The ship was driven ashore at Wexford. She was on a voyage from Montreal, Lower Canada, British North America to Liverpool, Lancashire.

=== 31 January ===
List of shipwrecks: 31 January 1811
Ship	State	Description
Alexander	United Kingdom	The ship was driven ashore on the Irish coast.
Bryan	United Kingdom	The ship foundered in the Irish Sea off Ireland's Eye, County Dublin.
Cadiz Packet	United Kingdom	The ship was driven ashore at Tynemouth, Northumberland.
Charles	United Kingdom	The ship was wrecked on the Irish coast. She was on a voyage from Liverpool to Jamaica via Cork.
Commerce	United Kingdom	The ship was wrecked at Whitby, Yorkshire.
Conjuror	United Kingdom	The ship was sighted off Penzance, Cornwall whilst on a voyage from Rio de Janeiro to London. No further trace, presumed foundered with the loss of all hands.
Elbe	United Kingdom	The ship was driven ashore on the Irish coast.
Good Intent	United Kingdom	The ship was driven ashore at Tynemouth. She was later refloated.
Jubilee	United Kingdom	The full-rigged ship struck a rock off Killough, County Down and sank with the loss of all 22 crew. She was on a voyage from Greenock, Renfrewshire to Suriname.
Juno	United Kingdom	The ship foundered in the Irish Sea off Ireland's Eye, or was driven ashore at Howth, County Dublin. She was on a voyage from Workington, Cumberland to Dublin.
Lady Dunbar	United Kingdom	The ship was wrecked in Coal-pit Bay, County Down with the loss of thirteen of the fourteen people on board.
Little George	United Kingdom	The ship ran aground and was wrecked near Wexford. Her crew were rescued. She was on a voyage from Greenock, Renfrewshire to Trinidad.
Lowther	United Kingdom	The ship struck rocks off Islandmagee, County Antrim and was wrecked with the loss of all hands. She was on a voyage from Belfast to Maryport, Cumberland.
Nancy	United Kingdom	The ship was driven ashore at Bridlington, Yorkshire.
Robert	United Kingdom	The sloop was wrecked at Scarnachan Point, County Antrim with the loss of three of the ten people on board. She was on a voyage from Glasgow, Renfrewshire to Belfast.
Samuel	United Kingdom	The ship was driven ashore south of Sunderland, County Durham.
Supply	United Kingdom	The ship was driven ashore south of Sunderland.
Telemachus	United Kingdom	The ship was driven ashore at Tynemouth. She was later refloated.
Trial	United Kingdom	The ship was driven ashore and wrecked in Lough Swilly with the loss of all hands. She was on a voyage from Glasgow, Renfrewshire to Dublin.
Trio	United Kingdom	The ship was driven ashore at Bridlington.
Warrington	United Kingdom	The brig was wrecked near Ballywalter, County Down with the loss of all hands.
Unnamed	United Kingdom	The ship was wrecked in Dundrum Bay. Her crew were rescued.

=== Unknown date ===
List of shipwrecks: Unknown date in January 1811
Ship	State	Description
Active	United Kingdom	The ship was sighted off Lough Swilly in early January whilst on a voyage from Galway to Rathmelton, County Donegal. No further trace, presumed foundered with the loss of all hands.
Ariadne	United Kingdom	The ship was lost on the coast of Sweden. She was on a voyage from London to a Baltic port.
Atlantic	United Kingdom	The ship was abandoned off the Irish coast. She was on a voyage from the River Plate to Liverpool, Lancashire.
Bell	United Kingdom	The ship was driven ashore. She was refloated and taken in to Northfleet, Kent.
Bolina	United Kingdom	Napoleonic Wars: The ship was captured and burnt by the privateer Invincible Bonaparte (France). Bolina was on a voyage from Plymouth, Devon to Boston, Massachusetts, United States.
Briganza	Portugal	The ship was driven ashore and damaged at Liverpool. She was on a voyage from Demerara. Briganza was later refloated.
Castor	United Kingdom	The ship was driven ashore and damaged near Liverpool. She was on a voyage from Liverpool to Charleston, South Carolina, United States. She was refloated.
Catherine	United Kingdom	The ship was driven ashore at the mouth of the Humber. She was on a voyage from Heligoland to Hull, Yorkshire. Catherine was refloated on 23 January and taken in to Hull.
Ceres	United Kingdom	The ship foundered whilst on a voyage from Liverpool to Lisbon, Portugal. Her crew were rescued by HMS Shannon (Royal Navy).
Clyde	United Kingdom	Napoleonic Wars: The ship was captured and burn by the privateer Invincible Bonaparte (France.
Commerce	United Kingdom	The ship foundered in the Irish Sea off Youghal, County Cork. Her crew were rescued. She was on a voyage from Liverpool to Bristol, Gloucestershire.
Elizabeth	United Kingdom	The ship was driven ashore and wrecked on Islay She was on a voyage from Prince Edward Island, British North America to Liverpool.
El Vinceder	Spanish Navy	The ship of the line was wrecked in the Bay of Boza, Sardinia.
Fame	United Kingdom	The ship foundered whilst on a voyage from British Honduras to Liverpool.
Hoop	Flag unknown	The ship foundered in the Baltic Sea off Cape Kolka, Russia.
James	United Kingdom	The brig ran aground in the River Towy.
John	United Kingdom	The ship foundered in the Irish Sea off The Skerries. She was on a voyage from Dundalk County Louth to Portsmouth, Hampshire.
John	United Kingdom	The ship was driven ashore at Berbice. She was refloated.
Liberty	United Kingdom	The ship was driven ashore east of The Skerries. She was on a voyage from Fishguard, Pembrokeshire to Liverpool. She was refloated and taken in to Holyhead, Anglesey.
Linskill	United Kingdom	The transport ship was lost in the Tagus with the loss of six of her crew.
Lively	United Kingdom	The ship was driven ashore at Holyhead, Anglesey.
Lord Duncan	United Kingdom	The ship was wrecked at Loch Indaal, Islay. She was on a voyage from Lisbon, Portugal to Leith, Lothian.
Lucy	United Kingdom	The ship was wrecked at Crookhaven, County Cork with some loss of life. She was on a voyage from Malta to London.
Mary	United Kingdom	The ship was driven ashore and damaged near Plymouth, Devon. She was on a voyage from Quebec City, Lower Canada, British North America to London. She was refloated on 12 January.
Mary Elizabeth	United Kingdom	The ship was wrecked near Dublin. Her crew were rescued. She was on a voyage from Liverpool to Dublin.
Mentor	United Kingdom	The ship was driven ashore at Tralee, County Kerry. She was on a voyage from Newfoundland, British North America to Liverpool.
Minns	United Kingdom	The brig was driven ashore and wrecked at Portsmouth, Hampshire. She was on a voyage from London to Montserrat.
Norge	(Denmark) Norway	The ship foundered in the North Sea off Tanager.
Phœnix	United Kingdom	The ship foundered off the coast of Sweden.
Ranger	United Kingdom	The ship departed Valencia, Spain for London. No further trace, presumed foundered with the loss of all hands.
Recovery	United Kingdom	The ship sailed from Nevis on 19 January. She met with considerable damage shortly thereafter and had to put back into Nevis, where she was to unload. She was condemned at Nevis.
Sheerness	United Kingdom	The ship sprang a leak and was abandoned by her crew, who were rescued by London Packet (United Kingdom). Sheerness was on a voyage from São Migue, Azores to London.
Success	United Kingdom	The ship foundered in the Irish Sea off the Isle of Man. She was on a voyage from Newfoundland to Liverpool.
Thetis	United Kingdom	The ship was driven ashore in the River Thames downstream of Gravesend, Kent.
Triton	United Kingdom	The ship was wrecked on Islay. Her crew were rescued. She was on a voyage from New York, United States to Liverpool.
Urania	United Kingdom	War of the Fifth Coalition: The ship was captured by the French. She was run ashore near Dieppe, Seine-Inférieure.
Visurgus	Russia	The ship was lost near Arkhangelsk.
William	United Kingdom	The ship was drinen ashore and wrecked on Islay. She was on a voyage from New Brunswick, British North America to Leith, Lothian.
Wylam	United Kingdom	The ship ran aground at Porto, Portugal in mid-January and was severely damaged. She was on a voyage from Newcastle upon Tyne, Northumberland to Porto. She was refloated and placed under repair.

== February ==
=== 1 February ===
List of shipwrecks: 1 February 1811
Ship	State	Description
Frederick	United States	The ship was wrecked off Bermuda. She was on a voyage from New York to the West Indies.
Hibernia	United Kingdom	The ship foundered in the Irish Sea off the Isle of Man with the loss of two of her crew. She was on a voyage from London to Liverpool, Lancashire.
John	United Kingdom	The ship was driven ashore in Loch Ryan. She was on a voyage from Greenock, Renfrewshire to Stornoway, Isle of Lewis.
Three Sisters	United Kingdom	The ship foundered in the North Sea off Whitby, Yorkshire. Her crew were rescued. She was on a voyage from Ipswich, Suffolk to the Firth of Forth.

=== 2 February ===
List of shipwrecks: 2 February 1811
Ship	State	Description
Martha	(United Kingdom of Great Britain and Ireland) Guernsey	The ship was wrecked at Tarragona, Spain. She was on a voyage from Tarragona to Guernsey.

=== 3 February ===
List of shipwrecks: 3 February 1811
Ship	State	Description
Friends Endeavour	United Kingdom	The ship foundered in the English Channel off Rame Head, Cornwall. Her crew were rescued. She was on a voyage from Plymouth, Devon to Falmouth, Cornwall.

=== 4 February ===
List of shipwrecks: 4 February 1811
Ship	State	Description
Fancy	United Kingdom	The ship was wrecked at Port Louis, Mauritius.

=== 5 February ===
List of shipwrecks: 5 February 1811
Ship	State	Description
Fox	(United Kingdom of Great Britain and Ireland) Jersey	The ship foundered in Tramore Bay with the loss of all hands.

=== 6 February ===
List of shipwrecks: 6 February 1811
Ship	State	Description
Frende Brodre or Trendre Brodres	Denmark	The ship was wrecked in Whitesand Bay. Her crew were rescued.
James and John	United Kingdom	Napoleonic Wars: The ship was run ashore near the North Foreland, Kent to avoid capture by a French privateer. She was on a voyage from London to Lisbon, Portugal. She was refloated and taken in to Ramsgate, Kent in a leaky condition.
Ranger	United Kingdom	The brig was wrecked in Mill Bay, Plymouth with the loss of a crew member. She was on a voyage from Málaga, Spain to London.

=== 7 February ===
List of shipwrecks: 7 February 1811
Ship	State	Description
Cora	United Kingdom	The brig was driven ashore and wrecked in Bigbury Bay. Her crew were rescued. She was on a voyage from Gibraltar to London.
Favourite	United Kingdom	The ship capsized at Milford, Pembrokeshire and was severely damaged.
Francisco	(United Kingdom of Great Britain and Ireland) Malta	The ship was driven ashore and wrecked in the Isles of Scilly, United Kingdom. She was on a voyage from Malta to London.
Liberty	United Kingdom	The ship was driven ashore at Milford. She was on a voyage from Bristol, Gloucestershire to Dublin.
Perula	Flag unknown	The ship was driven ashore at Milford.
Unnamed	United Kingdom	The ship was wrecked at Kinghorn, Fife.

=== 8 February ===
List of shipwrecks: 8 February 1811
Ship	State	Description
Freide	United Kingdom	The ship was driven ashore and wrecked in Whitsand Bay. She was on a voyage from Malta to London.
Spartan	United Kingdom	The ship was driven ashore at Plymouth, Devon. She was on a voyage from Lisbon, Portugal to London. Spartan was later refloated.
Venus	United Kingdom	The ship was driven ashore at Plymouth. She was later refloated.
Unnamed	Denmark	The brig was wrecked in Finisterre Bay with the loss of all but one of her crew.
Unnamed	Spain	The ship was wrecked in Finisterre Bay. Her crew were rescued.

=== 9 February ===
List of shipwrecks: 9 February 1811
Ship	State	Description
Cadiz Packet	United Kingdom	The ship was wrecked on the "Black Meddings".
Friede	Denmark–Norway	The brig struck rocks in Whitesand Bay and was wrecked with the loss of three of the fourteen people on board. She was on a voyage from Gibraltar to London, United Kingdom.

=== 11 February ===
List of shipwrecks: 11 February 1811
Ship	State	Description
Bank Note	United Kingdom	The ship was driven ashore and wrecked at Atherfield, Isle of Wight. She was on a voyage from São Miguel Island, Azores to London.
Bristol	United Kingdom	The ship was wrecked on Nash Point, Glamorgan with the loss of three of her ten crew.
Elizabeth	United Kingdom	The ship was wrecked in Dundrum Bay.

=== 13 February ===
List of shipwrecks: 13 February 1811
Ship	State	Description
HMS Pandora	Royal Navy	The Cruizer-class brig-sloop was wrecked on Skagen, Denmark with the loss of 21 of her 127 crew. The survivors were taken prisoner by the Danes.
Maryann	United Kingdom	The ship was lost at Buenos Aires.

=== 14 February ===
List of shipwrecks: 14 February 1811
Ship	State	Description
Favourite	United Kingdom	The ship capsized at Milford Haven, Pembrokeshire and was severely damaged.
Liberty	United Kingdom	The ship was driven ashore and wrecked at Milford Haven. She was on a voyage from Bristol, Gloucestershire to Dublin.
Perula	United Kingdom	The ship was driven ashore and wrecked at Milford Haven.
Vestal	United Kingdom	The ship ran onto an anchor at St. Mawes, Cornwall and sank. She was on a voyage from Liverpool, Lancashire to London.

=== 15 February ===
List of shipwrecks: 15 February 1811
Ship	State	Description
Lovely Ann	United Kingdom	The brigantine was wrecked at Dunbar, Lothian. Her crew were rescued. She was on a voyage from Aberdeen to London.

=== 16 February ===
List of shipwrecks: 16 February 1811
Ship	State	Description
Amelia	United Kingdom	The ship was driven ashore and wrecked at Sandy Hook, New Jersey, United States. She was on a voyage from Leith, Lothian to New York, United States
HMS Amethyst	Royal Navy	The Penelope-class frigate was driven ashore and wrecked at Mount Batten, Plymouth, Devon with the loss of eight of her 274 crew.
Commerce	United Kingdom	The ship was wrecked on the Nayland Rock, in the North Sea off Margate, Kent. Her crew were rescued. She was on a voyage from Gibraltar to London.
Eleanor and Grace	United Kingdom	The ship was driven ashore at Margate. She was on a voyage from Waterford to London.
Hart	United Kingdom	A fire at Greenock, Renfrewshire burnt Hart to the waterline.
Hawke	United Kingdom	The ship sprang a leak in the English Channel off Dover, Kent and was abandoned by her crew. It was presumed that she consequently foundered.
Pelleisses	United Kingdom	War of the Fifth Coalition: The ship was captured by the privateer Rodeur (France). Pelleisses was on a voyage from Providencia Island to London. She was subsequently wrecked on Belle Île, Morbihan, France. All sixteen people on board were rescued.
Two Friends	United Kingdom	The ship was lost near South Foreland, Kent.
Unity	United Kingdom	The ship was driven ashore at Margate. She was on a voyage from Fowey, Cornwall to London.

=== 17 February ===
List of shipwrecks: 17 February 1811
Ship	State	Description
Bank Note	United Kingdom	The ship was driven ashore and wrecked at Atherfield, Isle of Wight. She was on a voyage from São Miguel, Azores to London.
Grinder	United Kingdom	The ship was driven ashore in Tramore Bay. Her crew were rescued. She was on a voyage from Lisbon, Portugal to London.

=== 18 February ===
List of shipwrecks: 18 February 1811
Ship	State	Description
Duchess of York	United Kingdom	The ship was at Tamatave, Madagascar, having landed troops and taken off the French garrison. A sudden wind parted Duchess of York from her anchor. She was seen going down in deep water and observers believed that she had struck a rock. All aboard were lost.
Leopard	United Kingdom	The ship was driven ashore at Waterford. She was on a voyage from Waterford to Porto.
Mary	United Kingdom	The ship ran aground at Milford, Pembrokeshire and was severely damaged. She was on a voyage from Swansea, Glamorgan to Waterford.
North Star	United Kingdom	The ship was driven ashore and sank at Dartmouth, Devon.

=== 20 February ===
List of shipwrecks: 20 February 1811
Ship	State	Description
Fame	United Kingdom	Napoleonic Wars: The ship was captured off Cádiz, Spain and was subsequently lost. She was on a voyage from Mogadore, Morocco to Cádiz.
Ives	United Kingdom	The ship was in collision with HMS Macedonian (Royal Navy) in the Atlantic Ocean 50 nautical miles (93 km) off Lisbon, Portugal. She was so severely damaged that she was set afire. Her crew were rescued by HMS Macedonian. Ives was on a voyage from Demerara to Greenock, Renfrewshire.

=== 21 February ===
List of shipwrecks: 21 February 1811
Ship	State	Description
Aurora	United Kingdom	The ship was driven ashore in Pegwell Bay, Kent. She was on a voyage from London to Lisbon, Portugal. Aurora was refloated on 23 February.
Bom Successo	Portugal	The ship was wrecked at Boa Vista, Cape Verde Islands with the loss of 36 lives. She was on a voyage from Porto to Rio de Janeiro, Brazil.
Chance	United States	The ship was lost near the Turks Islands. She was on a voyage from Savannah, Georgia to Falmouth, Jamaica.
John and Jane	United Kingdom	The transport ship was run down and sunk at Falmouth, Cornwall by HMS Franchise (Royal Navy) with the loss of more than 230 lives.
Maria	United Kingdom	The ship ran aground off Amelia Island, East Florida, New Spain and was severely damaged.
Venus	United Kingdom	The sloop was driven ashore at St John's Point, County Down. She was on a voyage from Bridgwater, Somerset to Belfast, County Antrim.
Wellington	United Kingdom	The transport ship was run down and sunk at Falmouth by Intercourse (United Kingdom) with the loss of six of her crew.

=== 22 February ===
List of shipwrecks: 22 February 1811
Ship	State	Description
Shamrock	United Kingdom	The ship was driven ashore and sank at Catania, Sicily. She was on a voyage from Malta to Sicily and Ireland.
Two Brothers	United Kingdom	The sloop was in collision with a brig at Plymouth, Devon and sank.

=== 23 February ===
List of shipwrecks: 23 February 1811
Ship	State	Description
Hopewell	United Kingdom	The collier was driven ashore and wrecked at North Shields, Northumberland.
Mary	United Kingdom	The collier was driven ashore at North Shields. She was later refloated.
HMS Shamrock	Royal Navy	The schooner foundered in the Mediterranean Sea at approximately 36°55′N 7°48′W near Cabo de Santa Maria, the southernmost point of Portugal.

=== 24 February ===
List of shipwrecks: 24 February 1811
Ship	State	Description
Boreal	United States	The ship foundered in the Atlantic Ocean (42°04′N 39°01′W) with the loss of two of her crew. Eleven survivors were rescued by Betsey (United Kingdom).
Juno	United Kingdom	The transport ship foundered in the Atlantic Ocean. Her crew were rescued.
Lily	United Kingdom	The ship was wrecked near Swansea, Glamorgan. She was on a voyage from Limerick to Plymouth, Devon.

=== 25 February ===
List of shipwrecks: 25 February 1811
Ship	State	Description
Consolo	United States	The ship sprang a leak and was abandoned in the Atlantic Ocean off Cape Sable, East Florida. She was on a voyage from Amelia Island, East Florida to Chatham, Massachusetts.
Factor	United States	The ship was abandoned by her crew. She was on a voyage from Wilmington, Delaware to Plymouth, New Hampshire.
Hellen	United Kingdom	The ship was wrecked on the Mull of Kintyre, Argyllshire with the loss of one of her eleven crew. She was on a voyage from New York, United States to Liverpool, Lancashire.

=== 26 February ===
List of shipwrecks: 26 February 1811
Ship	State	Description
Camelion	United Kingdom	The transport ship was wrecked on The Manacles with the loss of all hands. A Newfoundland dog survived.
Elizabeth	United Kingdom	The ship foundered in Dublin Bay. Her crew were rescued. She was on a voyage from Liverpool, Lancashire to Cork.
Lawrence	United Kingdom	The ship was driven ashore and wrecked at Pwllheli, Caernarfonshire. She was on a voyage from Buenos Aires to Liverpool.

=== 27 February ===
List of shipwrecks: 27 February 1811
Ship	State	Description
Margaret	United Kingdom	The ship struck the Filey Bridge sandbank and foundered in the North Sea.
True Love	United Kingdom	The ship was holed by her anchor and sank at Dublin.

=== 28 February ===
List of shipwrecks: 28 February 1811
Ship	State	Description
London	United Kingdom	The ship was wrecked near Selsey Bill, Sussex. Her crew were rescued. She was on a voyage from Martinique to London.
Unnamed	United Kingdom	The schooner was driven ashore and wrecked in St. Bride's Bay.

=== Unknown date ===
List of shipwrecks: Unknown date in February 1811
Ship	State	Description
Barbara	United Kingdom	The ship was lost near Anglesey.
Commerce	United Kingdom	The ship was driven ashore in Tramore Bay. She was on a voyage from Waterford to London.
Crosby	United Kingdom	The ship was lost near Gaspé, Lower Canada, British North America.
Edward Foote	United Kingdom	The ship foundered off Havana, Cuba. Her crew were rescued. She was on a voyage from Jamaica to London.
Elksnut	Russia	The ship was wrecked on the Norwegian coast.
Fortune	United Kingdom	The ship was wrecked on the coast of Sicily.
Fredonia	United Kingdom	The ship departed from the Hampton Roads for Liverpool, Lancashire between 13 and 16 February. No further trace, presumed foundered with the loss of all hands.
Friends	United Kingdom	The ship was wrecked on the Gunfleet Sand, in the North Sea off the coast of Essex. She was on a voyage from South Shields, County Durham to London.
Grace	United Kingdom	The ship was driven ashore at Youghal, County Cork. She was on a voyage from Dublin to Barbados.
Hector	United Kingdom	The ship was driven ashore at Beaumaris, Anglesey. She was on a voyage from Madeira, Portugal to Dublin
Hope	United Kingdom	The ship was lost in the St. Lawrence River. She was on a voyage from London to Quebec City, Lower Canada.
Hope	United Kingdom	The ship foundered in the North Sea whilst on a voyage from Great Yarmouth, Norfolk to Leith, Lothian. Her crew were rescued.
Isabella	United Kingdom	The ship was lost near Gaspé with the loss of all on board. She was on a voyage from London to Quebec City.
Lucy	United Kingdom	The ship was driven ashore in the River Plate between 12 and 15 February.
Mary	United Kingdom	The ship was wrecked on the Welsh coast. She was on a voyage from Liverpool, Lancashire to Porto, Portugal.
Montezuma	United Kingdom	The ship was wrecked at "Wedinoon", near Mogadore, Morocco. Her crew were rescued. All 19 people on board survived, but were taken prisoner by the Arabs.
Mount's Bay	United Kingdom	The ship was driven ashore at Harrington, Cumberland. She was later refloated and taken in to Harrington.
Pindada	United Kingdom	The full-rigged ship was wrecked on the Mouse Sand, in the North Sea off Harwich, Essex.
Polly	United Kingdom	The ship was driven ashore. She was refloated on 7 February and taken in to Scarborough, Yorkshire.
Providential	United Kingdom	The ship was driven ashore at the mouth of the Humber.
Roden	United Kingdom	The ship was driven ashore on the Scottish coast. She was on a voyage from St. Ubes, Portugal to Dublin.
Rising Sun	United Kingdom	The ship was driven ashore. She was on a voyage from London to Baltimore, Maryland, United States. She was refloated on 14 February and taken in to Ramsgate, Kent in a leaky condition.
Windsor or Winsor	United Kingdom	The ship foundered in the Irish Sea off The Skerries with the loss of all hands.

== March ==
=== 1 March ===
List of shipwrecks: 1 March 1811
Ship	State	Description
Caledonia	United Kingdom	The ship was driven ashore in the Clyde. She was on a voyage from Greenock, Renfrewshire to Cork.
Diligence	United Kingdom	The ship was driven ashore in the Clyde. She was on a voyage from Belfast, County Antrim to the Clyde.
Malta	United Kingdom	The ship ran aground on the Haisborough Sands, in the North Sea off the coast of Norfolk and was abandoned by her crew. She was on a voyage from South Shields, County Durham to London.

=== 2 March ===
List of shipwrecks: 2 March 1811
Ship	State	Description
Duchess of Athol	United Kingdom	The ship was abandoned in the North Sea off Tynemouth, Northumberland. She was on a voyage from Dundee, Forfarshire to Southampton, Hampshire.
Jane	United Kingdom	The ship sprang a leak and was abandoned whilst on a voyage from Leith, Lothian to Heligoland. Her crew were rescued by HMS Fancy (Royal Navy).
Minerva	United Kingdom	The ship was wrecked at Amelia Island, East Florida, New Spain. Her crew were rescued.

=== 3 March ===
List of shipwrecks: 3 March 1811
Ship	State	Description
Fortunée	France	Napoleonic Wars: The privateer was sunk in an engagement with HMS Theban (Royal Navy).
Harmony	United Kingdom	The ship was driven ashore in the Clyde. She was on a voyage from Greenock, Renfrewshire to Saint Croix. Harmony was refloated on 15 March at taken in to Greenock.
Hope	United Kingdom	The ship was driven ashore near Ayr.

=== 4 March ===
List of shipwrecks: 4 March 1811
Ship	State	Description
La Fortunée	France	War of the Fifth Coalition: The privateer, a lugger, was sunk in an engagement with HMS Theban (Royal Navy) in the English Channel off Dover, Kent, United Kingdom. Fifty-three of her 56 crew were lost.
Mars	United Kingdom	The ship was driven ashore in the Clyde. She was on a voyage from Savannah, Georgia, United States to the Clyde.

=== 5 March ===
List of shipwrecks: 5 March 1811
Ship	State	Description
Juno	United Kingdom	The ship was driven ashore at Peterhead, Aberdeenshire. She was on a voyage from London to Limerick.

=== 6 March ===
List of shipwrecks: 6 March 1811
Ship	State	Description
Apollo	United Kingdom	The ship was wrecked on the Gunfleet Sand, in the North Sea off the coast of Essex. Her crew were rescued.
Endeavour	United Kingdom	The ship was wrecked on the Gunfleet Sand. Her crew were rescued.
Satisfaction	United Kingdom	The ship was wrecked on the Gunfleet Sand. Her crew were rescued.
HMS Thistle	Royal Navy	The schooner was lost near New York, United States with the loss of six of her crew.

=== 7 March ===
List of shipwrecks: 7 March 1811
Ship	State	Description
Ticonio	United Kingdom	The ship was wrecked off Bermuda. Her crew were rescued. She was on a voyage from Wilmington, Delaware, United States to an English port.

=== 8 March ===
List of shipwrecks: 8 March 1811
Ship	State	Description
Mars	United Kingdom	The ship was driven ashore in Bigbury Bay with the loss of two of her crew. She was on a voyage from Lisbon, Portugal to London.

=== 9 March ===
List of shipwrecks: 9 March 1811
Ship	State	Description
Robert and Ellen	United Kingdom	The ship foundered in the Irish Sea. She was on a voyage from the Isle of Man to Glasgow, Renfrewshire.

=== 10 March ===
List of shipwrecks: 10 March 1811
Ship	State	Description
Aurora	United Kingdom	The ship was driven ashore near Lymington, Hampshire. She was later refloated.
Bird	United Kingdom	The ship was driven ashore near Lymington. She was on a voyage from Newcastle upon Tyne, Northumberland to Plymouth, Devon. She was later refloated.
Sarah	United Kingdom	The ship was driven ashore near Lymington. She was on a voyage from Great Yarmouth, Norfolk to Liverpool, Lancashire. She was later refloated.

=== 11 March ===
List of shipwrecks: 11 March 1811
Ship	State	Description
Union	United Kingdom	The ship was driven ashore and wrecked at Holyhead, Anglesey. She was on a voyage from Galway to Liverpool, Lancashire.

=== 12 March ===
List of shipwrecks: 12 March 1811
Ship	State	Description
Favorite	French Navy	Favorite (burning, far-left) Battle of Lissa: The Pallas-class frigate ran aground off Lissa, Austrian Empire. She was set afire and destroyed by her crew.

=== 13 March ===
List of shipwrecks: 13 March 1811
Ship	State	Description
Mary	United Kingdom	The ship foundered in the Bristol Channel with the loss of all hands. She was on a voyage from Swansea, Glamorgan to Bideford, Devon.

=== 23 March ===
List of shipwrecks: 23 March 1811
Ship	State	Description
Benson	United Kingdom	The ship was wrecked at Charleston, South Carolina, United States. She was on a voyage from British Honduras to London.

=== 24 March ===
List of shipwrecks: 24 March 1811
Ship	State	Description
Amazon	French Navy	The 44-gun frigate was driven ashore at Barfleur, Manche in an engagement with HMS Amelia, HMS Berwick and HMS Niobe (all Royal Navy). She was blown up and destroyed by her crew.
Dunmore	United Kingdom	The ship departed from New Providence, New Jersey, United States for London. No further trace, presumed foundered with the loss of all hands.
Fanny	United Kingdom	The ship capsized whilst on a voyage from Gainsborough, Lincolnshire to Hull, Yorkshire with the loss of five lives.
Providence	United Kingdom	The ship was wrecked on The Manacles. Her crew were rescued. She was on a voyage from Plymouth, Devon to Savannah, Georgia, United States.

=== 27 March ===
List of shipwrecks: 27 March 1811
Ship	State	Description
Fleece	United Kingdom	The ship ran aground and sank in the River Suir. She was on a voyage from Waterford to London. She was refloated on 10 April and taken in to Waterford for repairs.
Maria	Spain	The ship was driven ashore and wrecked at Cádiz.
Mars	United Kingdom	The ship was wrecked at Gibraltar.

=== 28 March ===
List of shipwrecks: 28 March 1811
Ship	State	Description
Felicity	United Kingdom	The ship was lost at Gibraltar.

=== 29 March ===
List of shipwrecks: 29 March 1811
Ship	State	Description
Beaulah	United Kingdom	The ship was driven ashore and wrecked at Cádiz, Spain.
John	United Kingdom	The ship ran aground at Ballyshannon, County Donegal. She was on a voyage from Liverpool, Lancashire to Ballyshannon.

=== 31 March ===
List of shipwrecks: 31 March 1811
Ship	State	Description
Fanny	United Kingdom	The sloop capsized in the River Trent at Burton Stather, Lincolnshire with the loss of all five people on board. She was on a voyage from Gainsborough, Lincolnshire to Hull, Yorkshire.

=== Unknown date ===
List of shipwrecks: Unknown date in March 1811
Ship	State	Description
Alert	United Kingdom	Napoleonic Wars: The ship was captured and taken in to Bizerte, Beylik of Tunis, where she was lost. Alert' was on a voyage from Malta to Cagliari, Sardinia and Liverpool, Lancashire.
Beulah	United Kingdom	The ship was wrecked at Cádiz, Spain between 27 and 29 March.
Experiment	United Kingdom	The ship foundered in the Irish Sea. She was on a voyage from Liverpool to Cork.
Fortunato	(United Kingdom of Great Britain and Ireland) Gibraltar	The ship foundered in the Bay of Cádiz between 27 and 29 March. Her crew were rescued.
Francis	United Kingdom	The ship was abandoned in the Bristol Channel. Her crew were rescued by Swiftsure (United Kingdom). Francis was on a voyage from New York, United States to Dublin.
Hope	United Kingdom	The ship was driven ashore near "Shinburness". She was on a voyage from Maryport, Cumberland to Annan, Dumfriesshire.
Madona d'Idra	Spain	The ship was lost near A Coruña. She was on a voyage from London to Smyrna, Ottoman Empire.
Nancy	United Kingdom	The ship was driven ashore and wrecked at Cádiz between 27 and 29 March. Her crew were rescued.
Providence	United Kingdom	The ship was wrecked on The Manacles. She was on a voyage from Plymouth, Devon to Amelia Island, East Florida.
HMS Shamrock	Royal Navy	The schooner foundered in the Mediterranean near Cabo de Santa Maria, Portugal.
Triumph	United Kingdom	The ship was driven ashore and wrecked at Cádiz between 27 and 29 March. Her crew were rescued.
Two Brothers	Denmark	The ship, a prize of HMS Tweed (Royal Navy), was lost near Leith, Lothian, United Kingdom.
150 unnamed vessels	Flags unknown	The ships were driven ashore and wrecked at Cádiz between 27 and 29 March. Fifty of them were wrecked.
Unnamed	France	Napoleonic Wars: The brig, a prize of the Royal Navy, foundered off the Isles of Scilly, United Kingdom.

== April ==
=== 6 April ===
List of shipwrecks: 6 April 1811
Ship	State	Description
Diana	United Kingdom	The ship departed from Aberdeen for Montreal, Lower Canada, British North America. No further trace, presumed foundered with the loss of all hands.

=== 9 April ===
List of shipwrecks: 9 April 1811
Ship	State	Description
Somerset	United Kingdom	The ship departed from Falmouth, Cornwall for London. No further trace, presumed foundered with the loss of all hands.

=== 12 April ===
List of shipwrecks: 12 April 1811
Ship	State	Description
Belfast	United Kingdom	The ship foundered in the Atlantic Ocean off Tory Island, County Donegal. Her crew were rescued.
Charles Carter	United States	The ship was wrecked on the Goodwin Sands, Kent, United Kingdom. Her crew were rescued. She was on a voyage from Charleston, South Carolina to London, United Kingdom.
Chilham Castle	United Kingdom	The West Indiaman was wrecked on the Goodwin Sands. Her crew were rescued. She was on a voyage from Suriname to London.
George	United Kingdom	The ship was wrecked on the Goodwin Sands. Her crew were rescued. She was on a voyage from Cork to London.
Molly and Sally	United Kingdom	The ship was wrecked near Newry, County Down. Her crew were rescued.
Sarah	United Kingdom	The ship was wrecked on the Goodwin Sands. Her crew were rescued. She was on a voyage from Gibraltar to London.

=== 13 April ===
List of shipwrecks: 13 April 1811
Ship	State	Description
Brothers	United Kingdom	The ship was driven ashore and wrecked on Heligoland.
Charles Carter	United Kingdom	The ship was wrecked on the Goodwin Sands, Kent.
Jorgen Christian	United Kingdom	The ship ran aground on the Stoney Binks, in the North Sea and was wrecked. Her crew were rescued. She was on a voyage from London to Hull, Yorkshire.
Newcastle	United Kingdom	The ship was driven ashore and sank near St Albans Head, Dorset. She was on a voyage from Portland, Dorset to Ramsgate, Kent.
Packet	United Kingdom	The ship foundered in the English Channel off the Owers Sandbank. Her crew were rescued. She was on a voyage from Weymouth, Dorset to Margate, Kent.

=== 14 April ===
List of shipwrecks: 14 April 1811
Ship	State	Description
Eliza	United Kingdom	The ship ran ashore and capsized in the River Trent near Stockwith, Nottinghamshire. She was on a voyage from Brancaster, Norfolk to Stockwith.
Heroine	United States	The ship was wrecked on Hog Island, Virginia. She was on a voyage from Lisbon, Portugal to Virginia.

=== 15 April ===
List of shipwrecks: 15 April 1811
Ship	State	Description
Concord	United Kingdom	The transport ship was destroyed by fire in the Hamoaze.
General Prescott	United Kingdom	The ship was lost in Bigbury Bay.

=== 16 April ===
List of shipwrecks: 16 April 1811
Ship	State	Description
Gobiton	United Kingdom	The ship sprang a leak in the North Sea and foundered. She was on a voyage from Hull, Yorkshire to Gothenburg, Sweden.
John C. Stocker	United States	The ship was driven ashore on the American coast. Her crew were rescued. She was on a voyage from St. Ubes, Portugal to Philadelphia, Pennsylvania.
Revance du Cerf	France	The privateer was burnt at Norfolk, Virginia, United States.

=== 17 April ===
List of shipwrecks: 17 April 1811
Ship	State	Description
Friend's Glory	United Kingdom	The sloop was driven ashore at Whitby, Yorkshire.
Fullerton	United Kingdom	The sloop was driven ashore at Whitby.
Harriet	United Kingdom	The ship foundered in the Grand Banks of Newfoundland Her crew were rescued by Eliza Ann (United Kingdom). Harriet was on a voyage from Jamaica to London.
Young Man's Delight	United Kingdom	The sloop was driven ashore and wrecked at Whitby.

=== 18 April ===
List of shipwrecks: 18 April 1811
Ship	State	Description
Catharina	(Denmark) Norway	The brigantine was driven ashore and wrecked at Portlethen, Aberdeenshire, United Kingdom with the loss of ten of her twelve crew. She was on a voyage from Kristiansand to Leith, Lothian, United Kingdom.
Richmond	United Kingdom	The ship was driven ashore and wrecked at Bervie, Aberdeenshire with the loss of all hands.

=== 19 April ===
List of shipwrecks: 19 April 1811
Ship	State	Description
Albion	United Kingdom	The ship caught fire off St Abb's Head, Berwickshire and was abandoned by her crew. She was on a voyage from South Shields, County Durham to Errol, Perthshire. She came ashore at Pittenweem, Fife.
Dispatch	United Kingdom	The ship was driven ashore at Flamborough Head, Yorkshire. She was on a voyage from Exeter, Devon to Sunderland, County Durham.
Hannah	United Kingdom	The ship ship foundered off North Berwick, Lothian with the loss of all hands. She was on a voyage from the River Carron to Deptford, Kent.
Sir William Grant	United Kingdom	The ship was wrecked on the Goodwin Sands.
Unnamed	Flag unknown	The ship foundered off North Berwick with the loss of all hands.

=== 20 April ===
List of shipwrecks: 20 April 1811
Ship	State	Description
Anderson	United Kingdom	The ship was driven ashore at Boddam, Aberdeenshire. Her crew were rescued. She was on a voyage from Leith, Lothian to Saint John, New Brunswick, British North America. She was later refloated and taken in to Peterhead, Aberdeenshire.
Hannah	United Kingdom	The schooner was wrecked near Scoughall, Lothian with the loss of all hands.

=== 21 April ===
List of shipwrecks: 21 April 1811
Ship	State	Description
Lapwing	United Kingdom	Napoleonic Wars: The ship was abandoned off Dunkerque, Nord, France. She was on a voyage from South Shields, County Durham to Portsmouth, Hampshire. She was captured by the French.
Trusty	United Kingdom	The trasnport ship ran aground off Drake's Island, Devon. She was on a voyage from Lisbon, Portugal to Plymouth, Devon.
Unnamed	United Kingdom	Napoleonic Wars: The brig was abandoned off Dunkerque.

=== 24 April ===
List of shipwrecks: 24 April 1811
Ship	State	Description
Friendship	United Kingdom	The ship was wrecked on the Newcombe Sand, in the North Sea off Lowestoft, Suffolk. Her crew were rescued. She was on a voyage from North Shields, Northumberland to London.
Mary and Jane	United Kingdom	The ship was wrecked near Campbeltown, Argyllshire Her crew were rescued. She was on a voyage from Sligo to Liverpool, Lancashire.
Two Brothers	United Kingdom	The ship sprang a leak and foundered in the Atlantic Ocean off Padstow, Cornwall Her crew were rescued. She was on a voyage from Bristol, Gloucestershire to Portsmouth, Hampshire.

=== 25 April ===
List of shipwrecks: 25 April 1811
Ship	State	Description
Alarm	United Kingdom	The schooner was wrecked on the Brazilian coast.
HM hired armed cutter Swan	Royal Navy	Gunboat War: The cutter was sunk in Sunningesund during an engagement with three Danish gunboats.

=== 26 April ===
List of shipwrecks: 26 April 1811
Ship	State	Description
Alarm	(United Kingdom of Great Britain and Ireland) Guernsey	The schooner was lost on the coast of Brazil. She was on a voyage from Rio de Janeiro to Guernsey.
Albion	United Kingdom	The ship caught fire off St. Abbs Head, Berwickshire and was abandoned. She was on a voyage from South Shields, County Durham to Errol, Perthshire. She later came ashore at Pittenweem, Fife and was wrecked.
Hannah	United Kingdom	The ship foundered in the North Sea off North Berwick, Berwickshire with the loss of all hands. She was on a voyage from Carron, Stirlingshire to Deptford, Kent.
Hope	United Kingdom	The ship was in collision with Nereus (United Kingdom) in Wemyss Bay and sank. Her crew were rescued. She was on a voyage from Liverpool, Lancashire to Leith. Lothian.
Providence	United Kingdom	The brig capsized at Sunderland, County Durham. She was later refloated.

=== 29 April ===
List of shipwrecks: 29 April 1811
Ship	State	Description
Alert	United Kingdom	Napoleonic Wars: The ship was driven ashore at St Margaret's Bay, Kent by five French privateers. She was on a voyage from Newport, Monmouthshire to London. Alert was refloated on 8 May and taken in to Dover, Kent.
Esperance	United Kingdom	Napoleonic Wars: The ship was driven ashore at St Margaret's Bay by five French privateers and was wrecked. She was on a voyage from Swansea, Glamorgan to London.
Flowers of Edinburgh	United Kingdom	Napoleonic Wars: The ship was driven ashore at St Margaret's Bay by five French privateers. She was on a voyage from Swansea to London. She was refloated on 6 May and taken in to Dover.
Welcome Friends	United Kingdom	Napoleonic Wars: The ship was driven ashore at St Margaret's Bay by five French privateers and was wrecked. She was on a voyage from Swansea to London.

=== 30 April ===
List of shipwrecks: 30 April 1811
Ship	State	Description
Ann	United Kingdom	The ship was wrecked in Bigbury Bay. She was on a voyage from St. Kitts to London.
Eliza	United States	The ship was wrecked on rocks off Bermuda. She was on a voyage from New York to Guadeloupe.

=== Unknown date ===
List of shipwrecks: Unknown date in April 1811
Ship	State	Description
Agenoria	United Kingdom	The ship ran aground in the River Trent near Gainsborough, Lincolnshire and was severely damaged. She was on a voyage from King's Lynn, Norfolk to Gainsborough.
Arthur Owen	United Kingdom	The ship was sunk by ice off the coast of Newfoundland, British North America.
Canada	United Kingdom	The ship was driven ashore near Beerhaven, County Cork. She was on a voyage from Saint Domingo to London. She was refloated.
Cleopatra	United Kingdom	The ship was driven ashore at Cape Trafalgar, Spain. She was refloated and put into Tarragona, Spain where she was declared a constructive total loss.
Cunningham	United Kingdom	The ship was sunk by ice off the coast of Newfoundland.
Echo	(United Kingdom of Great Britain and Ireland) Guernsey	The ship was sunk by ice off the coast of Newfoundland.
Felicity	United Kingdom	The ship foundered. Her crew were rescued.
Flora	United Kingdom	The transport ship was lost in Plettenberg Bay.
Harlequin	United Kingdom	The ship was wrecked on the Spanish coast. Her crew were rescued. She was on a voyage from Alicante, Spain to Bristol, Gloucestershire.
Maria Dolores	Spain	The ship was driven ashore at Cádiz.
Mary	United Kingdom	The ship was wrecked on the Berlengas.
Nancy	United Kingdom	The brig foundered in the Bristol Channel off Worms Head, Glamorgan with the loss of all hands.
Perseverance	United Kingdom	The schooner was sunk by ice off the coast of Newfoundland.
Robert	United Kingdom	The ship ran aground at Charleston, South Carolina, United States. She was on a voyage from Charleston to Portsmouth, Hampshire. She was refloated and put in to New York, United States, where she arrived on 25 April in a leaky condition.
Rose	United Kingdom	The ship struck a rock off Sherrie Island and foundered. She was on a voyage from Bristol to Lancaster, Lancashire.
Swift	United Kingdom	The ship was sunk by ice off the coast of Newfoundland.
Young Charlotte	United Kingdom	Napoleonic Wars: The ship was driven ashore on the coast of Jutland and was subsequently captured. She was on a voyage from Hull, Yorkshire to Heligoland.

== May ==
=== 1 May ===
List of shipwrecks: 1 May 1811
Ship	State	Description
Giraffe	French Navy	Giraffe and Nourrice Napoleonic Wars: The frigate caught fire, exploded and sank in Sagone Bay in an action involving HMS Pomone, HMS Scout and HMS Unite (all Royal Navy).
Nourrice	France	Napoleonic Wars: The flûte caught fire, exploded and sank in Sagone Bay in an action involving HMS Pomone, HMS Scout and HMS Unite (all Royal Navy).

=== 2 May ===
List of shipwrecks: 2 May 1811
Ship	State	Description
Alert	United Kingdom	The brig was wrecked off Madras, India.
HMS Chichester	Royal Navy	The Var-class flûte, a store ship, was wrecked off Madras with the loss of two of her crew.
Diligence	United Kingdom	The brig was wrecked off Madras.
HMS Dover	Royal Navy	The fifth rate was wrecked off Madras. Her crew were rescued.
Espranca	Flag unknown	The brig was wrecked off Madras.
Fort St. George	United Kingdom	The full-rigged ship was wrecked off Madras.
Fortune	United Kingdom	The brig was wrecked off Madras.
Hibernia	United Kingdom	The brig was wrecked off Madras.
Hope	United Kingdom	The cutter) was wrecked off Madras.
La Sousona or La Souzena	Flag unknown	The full-rigged ship, a cartel, was wrecked off Madras.
Mallagh	India	The brig was wrecked off Madras.
Nancy	United Kingdom	The ketch was wrecked off Madras.
Rein Deer	United Kingdom	The brig was wrecked off Madras.
Rungaumaugala	India	The brig was wrecked off Madras.
St. Anthony	United Kingdom	The brig was wrecked off Madras.
Success	United Kingdom	The brig was wrecked off Madras.
Sumatra	United Kingdom	The brig was wrecked off Madras.
Susannah	United Kingdom	The ship was wrecked off Madras.
Voldevia	United Kingdom	The full-rigged ship was wrecked off Madras.

=== 5 May ===
List of shipwrecks: 5 May 1811
Ship	State	Description
Cæcilia	United Kingdom	The brig foundered in the English Channel off Yealmpton, Devon with the loss of eleven of the thirteen people on board. She was on a voyage from Waterford to London.

=== 7 May ===
List of shipwrecks: 7 May 1811
Ship	State	Description
Henrietta Charlotta	United States	The ship foundered in the Atlantic Ocean with some loss of life. She was on a voyage from St. Ubes, Portugal to New York.

=== 9 May ===
List of shipwrecks: 9 May 1811
Ship	State	Description
Christian	United Kingdom	The transport ship was wrecked on Sardinia. Her crew were rescued.
Mary Prevost	United Kingdom	The ship ran aground at Amelia Island, East Florida and was wrecked.

=== 14 May ===
List of shipwrecks: 14 May 1811
Ship	State	Description
Active	United States	The ship was lost near Port Royal, Jamaica.

=== 16 May ===
List of shipwrecks: 16 May 1811
Ship	State	Description
Gobiton	Sweden	The ship sprang a leak and foundered in the Dogger Bank. She was on a voyage from Hull, Yorkshire, United Kingdom to Gothenburg.

=== 17 May ===
List of shipwrecks: 17 May 1811
Ship	State	Description
Charles	United Kingdom	The ship departed from Guernsey, Channel Islands for Gibraltar. No further trace, presumed foundered with the loss of all hands.

=== 19 May ===
List of shipwrecks: 19 May 1811
Ship	State	Description
Fountain	United Kingdom	The ship was wrecked on the Herd Sand, in the North Sea off Hartlepool, County Durham. Her crew were rescued by a lifeboat.
Frederick and Teresa	United Kingdom	The sloop foundered in Mount's Bay. Her crew survived.

=== 20 May ===
List of shipwrecks: 20 May 1811
Ship	State	Description
Exe	United Kingdom	The sloop was driven ashore at Portland, Dorset. She was on a voyage from Exeter Devon to London. She was refloated the next day and taken in to Weymout, Dorset.
George	United Kingdom	The ship ran aground and sank in the North Sea off Great Yarmouth, Norfolk with the loss of all but three of her crew.
Triton	United Kingdom	The ship was driven ashore at Porto, Portugal. She was later refloated and taken in to Porto.

=== 21 May ===
List of shipwrecks: 21 May 1811
Ship	State	Description
Jane and Betsey	United Kingdom	The ship foundered off Gigha. She was on a voyage from Sligo to Liverpool, Lancashire

=== 23 May ===
List of shipwrecks: 23 May 1811
Ship	State	Description
Isla	United Kingdom	The ship caught fire and was beached at Weymouth, Dorset. She was on a voyage from Sardinia to London. Isla was later refloated and taken in to Weymouth in a severely damaged condition.

=== 24 May ===
List of shipwrecks: 24 May 1811
Ship	State	Description
Adventure	United Kingdom	The ship was lost in the Gulf of St. Lawrence. Her crew were rescued. She was on a voyage from Leith, Lothian to Quebec City, Lower Canada, British North America.

=== 26 May ===
List of shipwrecks: 26 May 1811
Ship	State	Description
Helen	United Kingdom	The ship was driven ashore and wrecked on Cumbrae, Argyllshire. She was on a voyage from the Clyde to Pará.
New Union	United Kingdom	The ship was wrecked on the Arklow Banks, in the Irish Sea off County Wicklow with the loss of three of her crew. She was on a voyage from Cardiff, Glamorgan to Dublin.

=== 27 May ===
List of shipwrecks: 27 May 1811
Ship	State	Description
Anna	United Kingdom	The ship was driven ashore near Charleston, South Carolina. she was on a voyage from an American port to Portsmouth, Hampshire.

=== 29 May ===
List of shipwrecks: 29 May 1811
Ship	State	Description
Lively	United Kingdom	Napoleonic Wars: The ship was driven ashore at St. Margarets Bay, Kent by four French privateers. She was on a voyage from Great Yarmouth, Norfolk to Liverpool, Lancashire. Lively was later refloated and taken in to Ramsgate, Kent.
Venus	United Kingdom	Napoleonic Wars: The ship was driven ashore at St. Margarets Bay by four French privateers. She was on a voyage from Cardiff, Glamorgan to London. Venus was later refloated and taken in to The Downs.
Wodehouse	United Kingdom	Napoleonic Wars: The ship was driven ashore at St. Margarets Bay by four French privateers. She was on a voyage from Great Yarmouth to Liverpool. Wodehouse was later refloated and taken in to Ramsgate.

=== Unknown date ===
List of shipwrecks: Unknown date in May 1811
Ship	State	Description
Alexander	United States	The ship was wrecked on Cape Cruz, Cuba in late May. She was on a voyage from Jamaica to the United States.
Catherine and Isabella	United Kingdom	The ship was wrecked on the Scottish coast.
Courage	United Kingdom	The ship was wrecked near Ipswich, Suffolk on her maiden voyage.
Endeavour	United Kingdom	Napoleonic Wars: The ship was captured and burnt by Clorinde, Néréide and Renommée (all French Navy). She was on a voyage from Lisbon, Portugal to Marblehead, Massachusetts, United States.
Fame	United Kingdom	The ship was wrecked near Bergen, Norway. Her crew survived but were taken prisoner.
Harmonia	United Kingdom	The ship sprang a leak and was abandoned by her crew, who were rescued by Brutus (United Kingdom). Harmonia was on a voyage from Amelia Island, East Florida to Plymouth, Devon.
Hercules	United Kingdom	The ship foundered whilst on a voyage from Liverpool, Lancashire to Philadelphia Pennsylvania, United States. Her crew were rescued.
Horatio	United Kingdom	The ship was wrecked on Amelia Island, East Florida, New Spain.
Lady Provost	United Kingdom	The ship driven ashore on Amelia Island in early May. She was later refloated.
Maria	United Kingdom	The ship was destroyed by an explosion at Amelia Island.
Nelson	United Kingdom	The ship was driven ashore and wrecked near Southwold, Suffolk.
Purissima Concepcion	Spain	The ship was wrecked near A Coruña with the loss of most of her crew. She was on a voyage from London to Alicante.
Sumner	United Kingdom	Napoleonic Wars: The ship was captured and burnt by Clorinde, Néréide and Renommée (all French Navy). She was on a voyage from Liverpool to Lisbon.
Themistocles	United Kingdom	The ship was lost off Scio, Ottoman Greece. She was on a voyage from Malta to Smyrna, Ottoman Empire.
Windsor	United Kingdom	The ship was wrecked off Amelia Island. She was on a voyage from Savannah, Georgia, United States to Amelia Island.

== June ==
=== 2 June ===
List of shipwrecks: 2 June 1811
Ship	State	Description
Two Brothers	United Kingdom	The ship was driven ashore at Great Yarmouth, Norfolk. She was on a voyage from Wisbech, Cambridgeshire to London. She was later refloated and taken in to Great Yarmouth.

=== 4 June ===
List of shipwrecks: 4 June 1811
Ship	State	Description
Mennie	United Kingdom	The ship was wrecked at Preston, Lancashire with the loss of a crew member. She was on a voyage from Newry, County Down to Liverpool, Lancashire.

=== 5 June ===
List of shipwrecks: 5 June 1811
Ship	State	Description
Unity	United Kingdom	The ship was lost near Portland, Dorset. Her crew were rescued. She was on a voyage from Poole, Dorset to London.

=== 10 June ===
List of shipwrecks: 10 June 1811
Ship	State	Description
Friendship	United Kingdom	The ship was driven ashore and wrecked at Southwold, Suffolk. She was on a voyage from Sunderland, County Durham to London.

=== 14 June ===
List of shipwrecks: 14 June 1811
Ship	State	Description
Providence	United Kingdom	The ship was wrecked near Ballywalter, County down. Her crew were rescued. She was on a voyage from Chester, Cheshire to Dublin.

=== 16 June ===
List of shipwrecks: 16 June 1811
Ship	State	Description
Tonquin	United States	Battle of Woody Point: The barque was attacked by the Nuu-chah-nulth off Vancouver Island, British North America with the loss of all but two of her 22 crew. One of the survivors managed to set fire to the ship, which exploded killing him and at least 100 Nuu-chah-nulth.

=== 22 June ===
List of shipwrecks: 22 June 1811
Ship	State	Description
Briton	United Kingdom	The ship was driven ashore and damaged at Spurn Point, Yorkshire. She was on a voyage from London to Hull, Yorkshire. She was later refloated and taken in to Hull.

=== 29 June ===
List of shipwrecks: 29 June 1811
Ship	State	Description
HMS Firm	Royal Navy	Napoleonic Wars: The Archer-class gun-brig ran aground in Cancalle Bay. She was set afire by her crew to prevent her capture by the French. HMS Fylla rescued her crew.

=== 30 June ===
List of shipwrecks: 30 June 1811
Ship	State	Description
Edinburgh	United Kingdom	The smack was driven ashore and wrecked at Whitby, Yorkshire. All 23 people on board were rescued by the Whitby Lifeboat. She was on a voyage from Leith, Lothian to Lyme Regis, Dorset.

=== Unknown date ===
List of shipwrecks: Unknown date in June 1811
Ship	State	Description
Brothers	United Kingdom	The ship was driven ashore at Wexford. She was refloated on 19 June and taken in to Wexford.
Calypso	United Kingdom	The ship was wrecked near Sligo with the loss of all hands. She was on a voyage from Waterford to Sligo.
Charlotte	United Kingdom	The ship was driven ashore near Pwllheli, Caernarfonshire. She was on a voyage from Cork to Liverpool, Lancashire.
Goodintent	United Kingdom	The ship was lost near Londonderry. She was on a voyage from Newfoundland, British North America to Terceira, Azores and Liverpool.
Louise	Flag unknown	The ship was abandoned in the North Sea off the coast of Norfolk, United Kingdom. She was boarded by the crew of a fishing boat and taken in to Great Yarmouth, Norfolk.
Nancy	United Kingdom	The ship was lost whilst on a voyage from Jersey, Channel Islands to Southampton, Hampshire with the loss of a crew member.
Nancy	United States	The ship sprang a leak and was abandoned by her crew. She was on a voyage from Jamaica to Philadelphia, Pennsylvania.
HMS Staunch	Royal Navy	The Archer-class gun-brig foundered in the Indian Ocean off Madagascar with the loss of all 76 crew.
Thetis	United Kingdom	The ship was driven ashore at Quebec City, Lower Canada, British North America.
True Blue	United Kingdom	The ship was wrecked near Milford Haven, Pembrokeshire. She was on a voyage from Waterford to London.

== July ==
=== 5 July ===
List of shipwrecks: 5 July 1811
Ship	State	Description
Nicholas	United Kingdom	The ship sprang a leak in the Bristol Channel over 7 leagues off St. Ives, Cornwall and was abandoned by her crew.

=== 6 July ===
List of shipwrecks: 6 July 1811
Ship	State	Description
Conference	United Kingdom	The ship was wrecked at Liverpool, Nova Scotia, British North America.

=== 7 July ===
List of shipwrecks: 7 July 1811
Ship	State	Description
Harriet	United States	The schooner was driven ashore and wrecked at Saint-Pierre, Martinique.
Horizon	United States	The schooner was driven ashore and wrecked at Saint-Pierre, Martinique.
Phœnix	United States	The schooner was driven ashore and wrecked at Saint-Pierre, Martinique.
Rachel	United Kingdom	The ship was driven ashore and wrecked on Nevis. Her crew were rescued.
Spring Bird	United States	The schooner was driven ashore and wrecked at Saint-Pierre, Martinique.
St Andrew	United Kingdom	The ship was driven ashore at Antigua. She had been refloated by 31 July.

=== 10 July ===
List of shipwrecks: 10 July 1811
Ship	State	Description
Adventure	United Kingdom	The sloop was driven ashore in a hurricane at Saint Barthélemy.
Ann	United Kingdom	The schooner was driven ashore in a hurricane at Saint Barthélemy.
Ann Horatio	United Kingdom	The sloop was driven ashore in a hurricane at Saint Barthélemy.
Benham	United Kingdom	The schooner was sunk in a hurricane at Saint Barthélemy.
Catharine Shephard	United Kingdom	The schooner was sunk in a hurricane at Saint Barthélemy.
Chely	United Kingdom	The schooner was driven ashore in a hurricane at Saint Barthélemy.
Cleo	United Kingdom	The sloop was driven ashore in a hurricane at Saint Barthélemy.
Coimbra	Portugal	The schooner was driven ashore in a hurricane at Saint Barthélemy.
Dolphin	United Kingdom	The sloop was driven ashore in a hurricane at Saint Barthélemy.
Echo	United Kingdom	The brig was driven ashore in a hurricane at Saint Barthélemy.
Eclipse	United Kingdom	The schooner was wrecked in a hurricane at Saint Barthélemy.
Elizabeth Margaret	United Kingdom	The brig capsized in a hurricane off Saint Barthélemy.
Emily	United Kingdom	The schooner was driven ashore in a hurricane at Saint Barthélemy.
Experiment	United Kingdom	The schooner was driven ashore in a hurricane at Saint Barthélemy.
Enterprize	United Kingdom	The schooner was driven ashore in a hurricane at Saint Barthélemy.
Guernsey	United Kingdom	The brig was wrecked in a hurricane at Saint Barthélemy.
Hope	United Kingdom	The schooner was sunk in a hurricane at Saint Barthélemy.
John	United Kingdom	The sloop was driven ashore in a hurricane at Saint Barthélemy.
La Rosa	United Kingdom	The schooner was driven ashore in a hurricane at Saint Barthélemy.
Maria	United Kingdom	The schooner was driven ashore in a hurricane at Saint Barthélemy.
Meteor	United Kingdom	The brig was driven ashore in a hurricane at Saint Barthélemy.
Mount Vernon	United Kingdom	The schooner was driven ashore in a hurricane at Saint Barthélemy.
Neptune	United Kingdom	The sloop was wrecked in a hurricane at Saint Barthélemy.
Northern Liberties	United Kingdom	The schooner was wrecked in a hurricane at Saint Barthélemy.
Rebecca	United Kingdom	The brig was wrecked in a hurricane at Saint Barthélemy.
Rebecca	United Kingdom	The schooner was wrecked in a hurricane at Saint Barthélemy.
Resolution	United Kingdom	The full-rigged ship was driven ashore in a hurricane at Saint Barthélemy.
Richard	United Kingdom	The schooner was sunk in a hurricane at Saint Barthélemy.
Sally	United Kingdom	Captain Antonio's schooner was driven ashore in a hurricane at Saint Barthélemy.
Sally	United Kingdom	Captain Langley's schooner was driven ashore in a hurricane at Saint Barthélemy.
Star	United Kingdom	The schooner was wrecked in a hurricane at Saint Barthélemy.
Tom	United Kingdom	The sloop was driven ashore in a hurricane at Saint Barthélemy.
Trafalgar	United Kingdom	The schooner was wrecked in a hurricane at Saint Barthélemy.
Trinity	United Kingdom	The sloop was driven ashore in a hurricane at Saint Barthélemy.
Whim	United Kingdom	The sloop was driven ashore in a hurricane at Saint Barthélemy.
Five unnamed vessels	United Kingdom	Two schooners and three other vessels were driven ashore at Saint Barthélemy.

=== 11 July ===
List of shipwrecks: 11 July 1811
Ship	State	Description
Fanny	United States	The ship capsized whilst on a voyage from Virginia to Jamaica.

=== 12 July ===
List of shipwrecks: 12 July 1811
Ship	State	Description
Almira	United States	The brig capsized and sank with the loss of all but three of her crew. She was on a voyage from the United States to Lisbon, Portugal.

=== 14 July ===
List of shipwrecks: 14 July 1811
Ship	State	Description
John	United Kingdom	The ship was abandoned in the Atlantic Ocean 400 nautical miles (740 km) west of the Isles of Scilly. Her crew were rescued by Watt (United Kingdom). John was on a voyage from Porto, Portugal to Prince Edward Island, British North America

=== 17 July ===
List of shipwrecks: 17 July 1811
Ship	State	Description
Eliza Ann	United States	The ship foundered in the Atlantic Ocean. Her crew were rescued by Mars (United Kingdom). Eliza Ann was on a voyage from the Cape Verde Islands to Charleston, South Carolina.
Peggy	United Kingdom	The ship was driven ashore and wrecked on St Nicholas Island, Devon. She was on a voyage from Swansea, Glamorgan to Plymouth, Devon.
Phœnix	United Kingdom	The ship departed from Limerick for Liverpool, Lancashire. No further trace, presumed foundered in the Irish Sea with the loss of all hands.
Thames	United Kingdom	The ship was captured and burnt by the privateer Duc de Dantzig (France). Her crew were put aboard the schooner Ann (United Kingdom), which was also captured but was later released.

=== 19 July ===
List of shipwrecks: 19 July 1811
Ship	State	Description
Prince of Wales	United Kingdom	The ship was lost on Heneaga. All on board were rescued by Barbara (United Kingdom). Prince of Wales was on a voyage from Jamaica to Falmouth, Cornwall.

=== 21 July ===
List of shipwrecks: 21 July 1811
Ship	State	Description
Ambrosia	United Kingdom	The ship was wrecked on the Florida Reef. Her crew were rescued. She was on a voyage from Jamaica to London.
Perula	United Kingdom	The ship foundered in the English Channel 7 leagues (21 nautical miles (39 km)) south west of the Isle of Wight. She was on a voyage from London to Porto, Portugal.

=== 22 July ===
List of shipwrecks: 22 July 1811
Ship	State	Description
Lady Penrhyn	United Kingdom	The ship was captured and burnt by the privateer Duc de Dantzig (France). Her crew were put aboard the schooner Ann (United Kingdom), which was also captured but was later released.

=== 28 July ===
List of shipwrecks: 28 July 1811
Ship	State	Description
Exchange	United Kingdom	Napoleonic Wars: The ship was captured in the Mona Passage by the privateer Marengo (France) whilst on a voyage from Curaçao to London. She was set afire and sunk.

=== 29 July ===
List of shipwrecks: 29 July 1811
Ship	State	Description
HMS Guachapin	Royal Navy	The brig was driven ashore and wrecked at Rat Island, Antigua in a hurricane. Her crew survived. HMS Guachapin was later salvaged and sold out of service.

=== Unknown date ===
List of shipwrecks: Unknown date in July 1811
Ship	State	Description
Braganza	United Kingdom	The ship was driven ashore at Antigua between 6 and 9 July. She was later refloated.
Baltic	United Kingdom	The ship was driven ashore and wrecked at Montserrat between 7 and 9 July. Her crew were rescued.
Eliza	(United Kingdom of Great Britain and Ireland) New South Wales	The ship was wrecked at Port Stephens. Her crew survived.
Hibernia	United States	The ship was wrecked on the south coast of Cuba. She was on a voyage from Jamaica to Philadelphia, Pennsylvania.
Hermit	United Kingdom	The ship was driven ashore and wrecked at Saint Croix, Virgin Islands between 6 and 9 July.
Isabella	United Kingdom	The ship ran aground in Dublin Bay. She was on a voyage from Sicily to Dublin.
John and Hannah	United Kingdom	The sloop foundered in the English Channel off Start Point, Devon with the loss of one of the three people on board. She was on a voyage from Portsmouth, Hampshire to Plymouth, Devon.
Louisa	United Kingdom	The ship was wrecked on the Isle of Pines, Cuba. Her crew were rescued.
Speculation	United Kingdom	The ship was driven ashore and wrecked at Antigua between 6 and 9 July.
St. Andrew	United Kingdom	The ship was driven ashore and wrecked at Antigua between 6 and 9 July.
Susan	United Kingdom	The ship was driven ashore and wrecked at Antigua between 6 and 9 July.
Sussex	United Kingdom	The ship was driven ashore and wrecked at Saint Kitts between 6 and 9 July.
Thomas Henchman	United Kingdom	The ship was wrecked on a reef in the Strait of Malacca.
Venus	United Kingdom	The ship was wrecked at Saint Kitts between 6 and 9 July. She was on a voyage from Saint Kitts to Quebec City, Lower Canada, British North America.

== August ==
=== 3 August ===
List of shipwrecks: 3 August 1811
Ship	State	Description
Ram	United Kingdom	The ship departed from Heligoland for Hull, Yorkshire. No further trace, presumed foundered in the North Sea with the loss of all hands.

=== 4 August ===
List of shipwrecks: 4 August 1811
Ship	State	Description
No. 211	United Kingdom	The transport ship was driven ashore and severely damaged on The Needles, Isle of Wight.

=== 6 August ===
List of shipwrecks: 6 August 1811
Ship	State	Description
William	United Kingdom	The ship was wrecked on the Whitten Sand, in the Humber with the loss of four lives. She was on a voyage from London to Selby, Yorkshire.

=== 7 August ===
List of shipwrecks: 7 August 1811
Ship	State	Description
Expedition	United Kingdom	The ship was wrecked on The Manacles. Her crew were rescued. She was on a voyage from Dartmouth, Devon to a Welsh port.
Providence	United Kingdom	The ship struck a rock and foundered in the North Sea off Robin Hood's Bay, Yorkshire with the loss of most of her crew. Survivors numbered either one or three. She was on a voyage from South Shields, County Durham to London.

=== 9 August ===
List of shipwrecks: 9 August 1811
Ship	State	Description
Happy Return	United Kingdom	The ship was wrecked on the Herd Sand, in the North Sea off North Shields, Northumberland. Her crew were rescued by the lifeboat Northumberland (United Kingdom).

=== 10 August ===
List of shipwrecks: 10 August 1811
Ship	State	Description
Sarah Ann	United Kingdom	The ship was driven ashore and wrecked in the River Thames near Greenwich, Kent. She was on a voyage from London to Porto, Portugal
Three Sisters	United Kingdom	The ship ran aground on Scroby Sands, Norfolk and sank. She was on a voyage from Aberdeen to London.

=== 11 August ===
List of shipwrecks: 11 August 1811
Ship	State	Description
Santa Anna	United Kingdom	The whaler was wrecked north of New Guinea. Her crew were rescued. She was on a voyage from the South Seas to London.

=== 16 August ===
List of shipwrecks: 16 August 1811
Ship	State	Description
George	United Kingdom	The ship was wrecked off Amelia Island, East Florida, New Spain. She was on a voyage from Liverpool, Lancashire to Amelia Island.
Martha Crawley	United States	The ship was wrecked in the Abaco Islands. Her crew were rescued. She was on a voyage from Charleston, South Carolina to Havana, Cuba.

=== 18 August ===
List of shipwrecks: 18 August 1811
Ship	State	Description
Runcorn	United Kingdom	The ship ran aground on the Dungeon Sand, in Liverpool Bay. Three lives were lost in the subsequent rescue of her passengers and crew.
HMS Tartar	Royal Navy	The Narcissus-class frigate ran aground on Hiiumaa, Russia. She was refloated.
William	United Kingdom	The ship was wrecked at Klegod on the coast of Jutland.

=== 21 August ===
List of shipwrecks: 21 August 1811
Ship	State	Description
HMS Tartar	Royal Navy	The Narcissus-class frigate was beached on Kahar Islet in the Baltic Sea off the coast of Estonia in the Russian Empire. She was subsequently set afire and destroyed by her crew, who were rescued by HMS Ethalion (Royal Navy).

=== 23 August ===
List of shipwrecks: 23 August 1811
Ship	State	Description
Resolution	United Kingdom	The brig was wrecked at Gairloch, Ross-shire.

=== 26 August ===
List of shipwrecks: 26 August 1811
Ship	State	Description
Lord Dalkeith	United Kingdom	The ship was wrecked near Dumfries. She was on a voyage from Pictou, Nova Scotia, British North America to Dumfries.
Traveller	United Kingdom	The ship ran aground at Millbay, Plymouth, Devon.

=== 27 August ===
List of shipwrecks: 27 August 1811
Ship	State	Description
Ceres	United Kingdom	The transport ship was destroyed by fire in the Tagus.

=== Unknown date ===
List of shipwrecks: Unknown date in August 1811
Ship	State	Description
Espade do Ferra	Portugal	The ship ran aground in the Mozambique Channel and was severely damaged. She was on a voyage from Calcutta, India to Pernambuco, Brazil. She was refloated and placed under repair.
Especulacoa	Portugal	The ship was wrecked on the Brazilian coast. She was on a voyage from the Cape Verde Islands to Brazil.
Hard Times	United States	The ship was wrecked on Sable Island, British North America. She was on a voyage from Philadelphia, Pennsylvania to Saint Petersburg, Russia.
Rigby	United Kingdom	The ship was driven ashore and wrecked on an island near Cuba in early August. She was on a voyage from Jamaica to London.

== September ==
=== 1 September ===
List of shipwrecks: 1 September 1811
Ship	State	Description
Tobago	United Kingdom	Napoleonic Wars: The ship was captured and burnt off Saint Barthélemy by the privateer Duc de Dantzig (France). She was on a voyage from Guadeloupe to Saint Barthélemy and New Brunswick, British North America.

=== 2 September ===
List of shipwrecks: 2 September 1811
Ship	State	Description
Ann and Elizabeth	United Kingdom	The ship foundered in the Atlantic Ocean off Boscastle, Cornwall. Her crew were rescued. She was on a voyage from Swansea, Glamorgan to Dublin.

=== 5 September ===
List of shipwrecks: 5 September 1811
Ship	State	Description
Bonetta	United Kingdom	The ship capsized at Plymouth, Devon.
Feodosia (Феодосия)	Imperial Russian Navy	The transport ship was driven ashore and wrecked on Shumshu of the Kuril Islands. with the loss of seven lives. She was on a voyage from Okhotsk to ru:Nizhnekamchatsk.

=== 8 September ===
List of shipwrecks: 8 September 1811
Ship	State	Description
Arkhangel Mikhail (Архангел Михаил, 'Archangel Michael')	Imperial Russian Navy	The brigantine was driven ashore and wrecked on Berezan Island in the Black Sea. Her crew were rescued. She was on a voyage from Galaţi, Ottoman Empire to Nikolayev.
HMS Hotspur	Royal Navy	War of the Fifth Coalition: The Apollo-class frigate ran aground off the coast of Calvados, France whilst engaged in an action against seven French brigs. She was refloated.
Rapid	United Kingdom	Napoleonic Wars: The ship was captured off Saint Croix, Virgin Islands by the privateer Duc de Dantzig (France) and was scuttled.
Three unnamed vessels	France	War of the Fifth Coaliton: Two brigs were driven ashore on the coast of Calvados in an action with HMS Hotspur (Royal Navy), which sank the third brig.

=== 15 September ===
List of shipwrecks: 15 September 1811
Ship	State	Description
Speculation	United Kingdom	The ship was driven ashore and wrecked near Whitstable, Kent. She was on a voyage from London to Falmouth, Cornwall.

=== 18 September ===
List of shipwrecks: 18 September 1811
Ship	State	Description
Mary	United States	The schooner was abandoned in the Atlantic Ocean (approximately 52°N 30°W).

=== 19 September ===
List of shipwrecks: 19 September 1811
Ship	State	Description
Dart	United Kingdom	The ship was lost at Saint Kitts. Her crew were rescued.

=== 20 September ===
List of shipwrecks: 20 September 1811
Ship	State	Description
Neil Malcolm	United Kingdom	The ship was sighted in the Atlantic Ocean heading for an American port. No further trace, presumed foundered with the loss of all hands.

=== 21 September ===
List of shipwrecks: 21 September 1811
Ship	State	Description
Jane	United Kingdom	The ship departed from Newfoundland, British North America for Gibraltar. No further trace, presumed foundered with the loss of all hands.

=== 23 September ===
List of shipwrecks: 23 September 1811
Ship	State	Description
Speedwell	United Kingdom	The brig departed from Madeira for Quebec City, Lower Canada, British North America. No further trace, presumed foundered with the loss of all hands.
Venerable	United Kingdom	The ship ran aground and was wrecked in the Bristol Channel.

=== 24 September ===
List of shipwrecks: 24 September 1811
Ship	State	Description
Ann	United Kingdom	The ship foundered in the Irish Sea. Her crew were rescued. She was on a voyage from Swansea, Glamorgan to Dublin.
Dasher	United Kingdom	The ship was driven ashore at Deal, Kent. She was on a voyage from San Salvador to London.
Hero	United Kingdom	The ship was driven ashore. She was on a voyage from Lisbon, Portugal to Liverpool Lancashire. She was refloated and taken in to Liverpool in a waterlogged condition.
Maria	United Kingdom	The ship foundered in the English Channel off Teignmouth, Devon. She was on a voyage from Teignmouth to the Bay of Fundy.
Mariner	United Kingdom	The brig foundered in the English Channel off Dover, Kent. She was on a voyage from Sunderland, County Durham to Hythe, Kent.
Mouche	France	Mouche and HMS Hermes The privateer, a lugger, was run down and sunk in the English Channel by HMS Hermes (Royal Navy) with the loss of 49 of her 61 crew.
Prince Augustus	United Kingdom	The ship was driven ashore near Dover. She was refloated and taken in to Ramsgate, Kent in a leaky condition.

=== 25 September ===
List of shipwrecks: 25 September 1811
Ship	State	Description
Dasher	United Kingdom	The ship was driven ashore and wrecked at Deal, Kent. She was on a voyage from St. Salvadore to London.
Hamilton	United Kingdom	The West Indiaman was wrecked at Birling Gap, Sussex. Her 26 crew survived. She was on a voyage from Martinique to London.
Helen	United Kingdom	The ship was wrecked near Portsmouth, Hampshire. She was on a voyage from Porto, Portugal to London.
Hope	United Kingdom	The ship was driven ashore and wrecked near Brighton, Sussex with the loss of three of her nine crew. She was on a voyage from Porto to London.
Hunter	United Kingdom	The West Indiaman was wrecked at Beachy Head, Sussex. Her nineteen crew survived. She was on a voyage from Martinique to London.
Industry	United Kingdom	The ship foundered off the Isle of Man with the loss of all hands. She was on a voyage from an Irish port to Maryport, Cumberland.
Inspector	United Kingdom	The ship was in collision with Surat Castle ( British East India Company) and was subsequently driven ashore at Margate, Kent. She was later refloated and take in to Ramsgate, Kent.
Isabella	United Kingdom	The sloop was driven ashore and wrecked at Rottingdean, Sussex with the loss of six of her nine crew. She was on a voyage from Porto to Hull, Yorkshire
Lydia	United Kingdom	The ship was driven ashore at Bridlington, Yorkshire. She was on a voyage from Emsworth, Hampshire to Bridlington.
Maria	United Kingdom	The ship was lost near Dingle, County Kerry. Her crew were rescued. She was on a voyage from St. Ubes, Portugal to Limerick.
Mariner	United Kingdom	The ship was driven ashore and wrecked near Dover, Kent. She was on a voyage from Sunderland, County Durham to Hythe, Kent.
Mary and Elizabeth	United Kingdom	The ship foundered in the English Channel off Portland, Dorset with the loss of the sole crew member on board.
Pleasant	United Kingdom	The ship was driven ashore in Tramore Bay. Her crew were rescued. She was on a voyage from Ayr to Cork.
Prince Gustavus	United Kingdom	The ship was driven ashore near Dover. She was refloated and talen in to Ramsgate in a leaky condition.
Richard and Mary	United Kingdom	The ship was wrecked at Hayle, Cornwall.
Sarah	United Kingdom	The ship was driven ashore at Grimsby, Lincolnshire. She was on a voyage from Portsmouth to Hull. She was later refloated and taken in to Hull.
Thomas and Ann	United Kingdom	The ship foundered in the English Channel off Portland. Her crew were rescued. She was on a voyage from London to Plymouth, Devon.
Valiant	United Kingdom	The brig was driven ashore and wrecked near Portsmouth. She was on a voyage from Caernarfon to London.
William	United Kingdom	The ship was wrecked on Anglesey with the loss of eleven lives. She was on a voyage from Dundalk, County Louth to Liverpool, Lancashire.

=== 26 September ===
List of shipwrecks: 26 September 1811
Ship	State	Description
Atlas	United Kingdom	The ship ran aground on the Kentish Knock, in the North Sea off Margate, Kent. She refloated but sank on 28 September 6 nautical miles (11 km) east south east of the Galloper Sandbank. Atlas was on a voyage from Jamaica to London.
Liberty	United Kingdom	The ship was driven ashore near Liverpool, Lancashire. she was on a voyage from Liverpool to Rio de Janeiro. Liberty was later refloated; she resumed her voyage.
St. Petries	Russia	The ship was wrecked on Öland, Sweden.

=== 27 September ===
List of shipwrecks: 27 September 1811
Ship	State	Description
Anna Holk Klas	(Denmark) Norway	The ship was wrecked at Killala, County Mayo, United Kingdom. Her crew were rescued.

=== 28 September ===
List of shipwrecks: 28 September 1811
Ship	State	Description
Tyne Packet 1803 ship (2)	United Kingdom	The ship sprang a leak off Cape Finisterre, Spain and was abandoned. Gardner (United Kingdom) rescued her crew. Tyne Packet was on a voyage from St. Ubes, Portugal to Dublin.

=== 30 September ===
List of shipwrecks: 30 September 1811
Ship	State	Description
Endeavour	United Kingdom	The brig was driven ashore and wrecked in the Gut of Canso.
Fame	United Kingdom	The ship was driven ashore on Prince Edward Island, British North America.
Greyhound	United Kingdom	The schooner was driven ashore and wrecked at Fisherman's Harbour, Nova Scotia, British North America.
Hibernia	United Kingdom	The schooner was driven ashore in the Gut of Canso.
Hunter	United Kingdom	The ship, a brig or schooner, was driven ashore and wrecked in he Gut of Canso.
Lady Delaval	United Kingdom	The transport ship was driven ashore and wrecked in the Gut of Canso.
Margaret	United Kingdom	The schooner foundered in the Atlantic Ocean off the coast of Nova Scotia. Her crew were rescued. She was on a voyage from Halifax, Nova Scotia to Barbados.
Mars	United Kingdom	The ship was wrecked on the coast of Nova Scotia with the loss of eight lives. She was on a voyage from Jamaica to Quebec City, Lower Canada, British North America.
Mary	(United Kingdom of Great Britain and Ireland) British North America	The ship was driven ashore and wrecked at "Lesamb", Nova Scotia with the loss of nine lives.
Orion	United Kingdom	The ship was wrecked on Sable Island, British North America. Her crew were rescued. She was on a voyage from St. Andrews, Fife to Newfoundland, British North America.

=== Unknown date ===
List of shipwrecks: Unknown date in September 1811
Ship	State	Description
Agnes	United Kingdom	The ship was driven ashore at Lulworth Cove, Dorset. She was on a voyage from Penryn, Cornwall to London.
Aurora	United Kingdom	The ship ran aground on the Haisborough Sands, in the North Sea off the coast of Norfolk.
Branxton	United Kingdom	The ship foundered in The Wash. Her crew were rescued.
Lady Delreal	United Kingdom	The transport ship was driven ashore at Cape Barfleur, Manche, France.
Maria	United Kingdom	The ship foundered in the Atlantic Ocean. She was on a voyage from Teignmouth, Devon to the Bay of Fundy.
Mary	(United Kingdom of Great Britain and Ireland) British North America	The ship was wrecked.
Mary	United States	Napoleonic Wars: The ship was attacked by two French privateers in the Kattegat and ran ashore. She was refloated and found to be severely leaky. She put in to Hull, Yorkshire, United Kingdom on 2 October.
Mercurius	Flag unknown	The ship was lost in the White Sea.
Margarett	United Kingdom	The ship foundered in the Atlantic Ocean. Her crew were rescued. She was on a voyage from Halifax, Nova Scotia, British North America to Jamaica.
Phœbe	United Kingdom	The ship was wrecked near Bideford, Devon with the loss of her captain. She was on a voyage from Porto, Portugal to Bristol, Gloucestershire.
Rebecca	United Kingdom	The ship was wrecked near Cardiff, Glamorgan. She was on a voyage from Jamaica to Bristol.
Spring Bird	United States	The ship foundered off Martinique.
Swiftsure	United States	The brig capsized in the Atlantic Ocean. Her crew were rescued. She was on a voyage from Messina, Sicily to New York.
Uniao	Portugal	The ship foundered in Dublin Bay. She was on a voyage from St. Ubes to Dublin.
Venerable	United Kingdom	The ship was driven ashore on the Welsh Hook, in the Bristol Channel.
William	United States	The ship capsized in the Bristol Channel on or before 30 September.
William	United Kingdom	The ship was wrecked on the coast of Jutland.
Wonolanset	United States	The ship was destroyed by fire at Portsmouth, New Hampshire.

== October ==
=== 1 October ===
List of shipwrecks: 1 October 1811
Ship	State	Description
Richard and Mary	United Kingdom	The ship was driven ashore in St Ives Bay. She was on a voyage from Madeira to Cork. Richard and Mary was later refloated and taken in to Swansea, Glamorgan.

=== 2 October ===
List of shipwrecks: 2 October 1811
Ship	State	Description
Belle of Lynn	United Kingdom	The ship was wrecked on Anticosti Island, Nova Scotia, British North America. Her crew were rescued.
Martha	United Kingdom	The ship was wrecked on Cape Breton Island, Nova Scotia. She was on a voyage from Londonderry to Prince Edward Island, British North America.

=== 4 October ===
List of shipwrecks: 4 October 1811
Ship	State	Description
Good Intent	United Kingdom	The ship was driven ashore and wrecked at Portsmouth, Hampshire. She was on a voyage from King's Lynn, Norfolk to Bristol, Gloucestershire.

=== 5 October ===
List of shipwrecks: 5 October 1811
Ship	State	Description
HMS Growler	Royal Navy	The gun-brig was driven ashore at Plymouth, Devon. She was refloated and went into dock for repairs; her crew survived.
USS Gunboat No. 2	United States Navy	The "Jefferson Gunboat" was sunk off St. Mary's, Georgia in a gale. 40 crew killed.
Iris	United Kingdom	The ship foundered whilst on a voyage from St. Ubes, Portugal to Dublin. Her crew were rescued.
James and Elizabeth	United Kingdom	The sloop was driven ashore and wrecked in the Cattewater. Her crew were rescued.
Lively	United Kingdom	The brig was driven ashore and wrecked near Blackwater, County Wexford. Her nine crew were rescued. She was on a voyage from Ayr to Cork.
Telemachus	United Kingdom	The schooner was driven ashore at Portsmouth, Hampshire.
Thomas	United Kingdom	The ship was wrecked in Dundrum Bay. Her crew were rescued. She was on a voyage from Liverpool, Lancashire to Tobermory, Argyllshire.

=== 6 October ===
List of shipwrecks: 6 October 1811
Ship	State	Description
Crescent	United Kingdom	The ship was driven ashore at Quebec City, Lower Canada, British North America. She was on a voyage from "Sydney Cove" to Quebec City. Crescent was refloated on 20 October and found to be severely damaged.

=== 7 October ===
List of shipwrecks: 7 October 1811
Ship	State	Description
Lord Sheffield	United Kingdom	The ship was wrecked in the Grand Banks of Newfoundland. Four survivors were rescued by Bridget (United Kingdom).

=== 8 October ===
List of shipwrecks: 8 October 1811
Ship	State	Description
Douglas	United Kingdom	Napoleonic Wars: The ship was captured by the privateer Diligent (France) whilst on a voyage from Jamaica to New Brunswick, British North America. She was set afire and sunk.

=== 9 October ===
List of shipwrecks: 9 October 1811
Ship	State	Description
Baltic Trader	United Kingdom	The ship was wrecked on Cape Breton Island, British North America. Her crew were rescued. She was on a voyage from London to Quebec City, Lower Canada, British North America.

=== 10 October ===
List of shipwrecks: 10 October 1811
Ship	State	Description
Hope	United Kingdom	The ship was in collision with London Packet (United Kingdom) and sank off the mouth of the Humber.

=== 11 October ===
List of shipwrecks: 11 October 1811
Ship	State	Description
Anna Maria	Sweden	The ship foundered off Gothenburg.
Mont Royal	United Kingdom	The ship was wrecked at Pensacola, East Florida, New Spain. She was on a voyage from Pensacola to an English port.

=== 12 October ===
List of shipwrecks: 12 October 1811
Ship	State	Description
Liverpool Packet	United Kingdom	The ship sprang a leak in the Atlantic Ocean off Tory Island, County Donegal and was abandoned. Six crew took to the jolly boat and were lost. The rest of the crew, and her passengers were rescued by HMS Endymion (Royal Navy).
Speedwell	United Kingdom	The ship departed from Berwick upon Tweed, Northumberland for Leith, Lothian. No further trace, presumed foundered with the loss of all hands.
St. Lucas	Sweden	The ship was abandoned at sea. Her crew were rescued by HMS Tweed (Royal Navy). St. Lucas was subsequently driven ashore on the coast of Jutland.

=== 13 October ===
List of shipwrecks: 13 October 1811
Ship	State	Description
Ant	United Kingdom	The ship was driven ashore and wrecked on Düne. Her crew were rescued. She was on a voyage from Hull, Yorkshire to Heligoland
Briton	United Kingdom	The ship was driven ashore and severely damaged at Hoylake, Lancashire. She was on a voyage from Porto, Portugal to Liverpool, Lancashire. Briton was refloated and taken in to Liverpool.
Endeavour	United Kingdom	The ship foundered in the North Sea off Staithes, Yorkshire with the loss of all hands. She was on a voyage from Sunderland, County Durham to Whitby, Yorkshire.
Fortuna	United Kingdom	The schooner was driven ashore and wrecked on Düne. Her crew were rescued. She was on a voyage from Heligoland to a Baltic port.
Jane	United Kingdom	The brig was driven ashore and wrecked on Düne. Her crew were rescued. She was on a voyage from Heligoland to London.
John and Nancy	United Kingdom	The ship was driven ashore at Ardmore, County Waterford. She was on a voyage from the Clyde to Dublin. John and Nancy was later refloated.
Liverpool Packet	United States	The 329-ton American-owned full-rigged ship foundered in the Atlantic Ocean 100 nautical miles (190 km) west of Tory Island, County Donegal with the loss of six of the 26 people on board. She was on a voyage from Belfast, County Antrim to Charleston, South Carolina, United States.
Lovely Nancy	United Kingdom	The ship was driven ashore at Formby, Lancashire. She was on a voyage from Liverpool to Stornoway.

=== 14 October ===
List of shipwrecks: 14 October 1811
Ship	State	Description
Hirondelle	France	Napoleonic Wars: The privateer, a lugger, was driven ashore at Rose Point, in the Baltic Sea by HMS Ranger (Royal Navy) and was burnt.
HMS Pomone	Royal Navy	HMS Pomone. The Leda-class frigate was wrecked off The Needles, Isle of Wight. Her crew were rescued by HMS Tisiphone (Royal Navy).

=== 15 October ===
List of shipwrecks: 15 October 1811
Ship	State	Description
Jane	United Kingdom	The ship was driven ashore at Broadhill, Aberdeenshire.
Success	United Kingdom	The ship was wrecked near the Mull of Galloway, Ayrshire with the loss of all hands.

=== 16 October ===
List of shipwrecks: 16 October 1811
Ship	State	Description
Progress	United Kingdom	The ship ran aground on the Barnard Sand, in the North Sea off the coast of Norfolk. She was on a voyage from Hull, Yorkshire to Cádiz, Spain. She was refloated and put in to Great Yarmouth, Norfolk.

=== 17 October ===
List of shipwrecks: 17 October 1811
Ship	State	Description
Astrea	United Kingdom	The brig was driven ashore on the coast of Newfoundland, British North America. She was on a voyage from Quebec City, Lower Canada, British North America to Sheerness, Kent.
Unnamed	United Kingdom	The galiot was run into by an American vessel off Leith, Lothian and sank. Her crew were rescued by the American vessel.

=== 20 October ===
List of shipwrecks: 20 October 1811
Ship	State	Description
Bredalbane	United Kingdom	The ship was driven ashore at Quebec City, Lower Canada, British North America.
Britannia	United Kingdom	The ship was driven ashore and severely damaged at Quebec City.
Catherine	United Kingdom	The ship was driven ashore and severely damaged at Quebec City.
Concord	United Kingdom	The ship was driven ashore at Quebec City.
Frederick	United Kingdom	The ship was wrecked on the Goodwin Sands, Kent.
Hanley Castle	United Kingdom	The ship was wrecked near Husum, Duchy of Schleswig. Her crew were rescued. She was on a voyage from Hull, Yorkshire to Heligoland.
James and David	United Kingdom	The ship was driven ashore at Quebec City.
Jane	United Kingdom	The ship was driven ashore and severely damaged at Quebec City.
Kangaroo	United Kingdom	The ship was driven ashore and wrecked at Quebec City.
Lord Middleton	United Kingdom	The ship was driven ashore at Quebec City.
Manly Castle	United Kingdom	The ship was wrecked at Husum, Duchy of Schleswig. Her crew were rescued. She was on a voyage from Hull, Yorkshire to Heligoland.
Margaret	United Kingdom	The ship was driven ashore at Quebec City.
Minerva	United Kingdom	The ship was driven ashore and severely damaged at Quebec City.
Moston	United Kingdom	The ship was driven ashore at Quebec City.
Neptune	United Kingdom	The ship was driven ashore at Quebec City.
Patience	United Kingdom	The ship was driven ashore at Quebec City.
Sir Henry	United Kingdom	The ship was driven ashore and severely damaged at Quebec City.
Three Brothers	United Kingdom	The ship was driven ashore at Quebec City.
William	United Kingdom	The ship was driven ashore and severely damaged at Quebec City.
Winchester	United Kingdom	The ship was driven ashore at Quebec City.

=== 21 October ===
List of shipwrecks: 21 October 1811
Ship	State	Description
Familien	(Denmark) Norway	The ship was discovered abandoned and waterlogged in the North Sea by HMS Cleopatra (Royal Navy), whic towe her in to Great Yarmouth, Norfolk, United Kingdom.
HMS Grouper	Royal Navy	The Ballahoo-class schooner ran aground on a reef and was wrecked 3 nautical miles (5.6 km) off Carret Island, Guadeloupe with the loss of one of her twenty crew.
Paciteur	Russia	The ship was driven ashore and wrecked near Orfordness, Suffolk, United Kingdom.

=== 22 October ===
List of shipwrecks: 22 October 1811
Ship	State	Description
Chapman (Чапман)	Imperial Russian Navy	The transport ship was driven ashore and wrecked on Rodsher in the Gulf of Finland. Her crew were rescued. She was on a voyage from Kronstadt to Kotka, Grand Duchy of Finland.

=== 23 October ===
List of shipwrecks: 23 October 1811
Ship	State	Description
Ann	United Kingdom	The ship was wrecked on Cape Sable Island, Nova Scotia, British North America. Her crew were rescued. She was on a voyage from the Clyde to New Brunswick, British North America.
Ellis	United Kingdom	The ship was driven ashore and wrecked at St. John's, Newfoundland, British North America. She was on a voyage from New Brunswick, British North America to Liverpool, Lancashire.

=== 24 October ===
List of shipwrecks: 24 October 1811
Ship	State	Description
Active	United Kingdom	The ship capsized in the Atlantic Ocean. Only two of her nine crew survived on the wreck until 29 October, when they were rescued by Argo (United Kingdom).

=== 25 October ===
List of shipwrecks: 25 October 1811
Ship	State	Description
Calista	United Kingdom	The ship was driven ashore in the Suriname River. She was later refloated.
Hope	United Kingdom	The ship was lost whilst on a voyage from Quebec City, Lower Canada, British North America to Newfoundland, British North America.
Mary	United Kingdom	The ship was driven ashore and wrecked at Kilmore, Isle of Skye. Her crew were rescued. She was on a voyage from St. Ubes, Portugal to Drogheda, County Louth.
Newport	United Kingdom	The ship ran aground and foundered in the Bristol Channel with the loss of all on board. She was on a voyage from Newport, Monmouthshire to Bristol, Gloucestershire.

=== 26 October ===
List of shipwrecks: 26 October 1811
Ship	State	Description
Jacob	United Kingdom	The ship sprang a leak and foundered in the English Channel off Weymouth, Dorset. Her crew were rescued. She was on a voyage from Poole, Dorset to Liverpool, Lancashire.
John and William	United Kingdom	The ship capsized in Swin (Thames)The Swin with the loss of her captain. She was on a voyage from Gainsborough, Lincolnshire to London.
Providentia	Sweden	The ship was lost near Christiansand, Norway.
William and James	United Kingdom	The ship sank at Scarborough, Yorkshire.

=== 27 October ===
List of shipwrecks: 27 October 1811
Ship	State	Description
Frederick	United Kingdom	The ship was wrecked on the Goodwin Sands, Kent. Her crew were rescued.
John and Elizabeth	United Kingdom	The ship was lost near Sunderland, County Durham. Her crew were rescued. She was on a voyage from Sunderland to Rye, Sussex.

=== 28 October ===
List of shipwrecks: 28 October 1811
Ship	State	Description
Anna Jacabina	Danzig	The ship was abandoned in the North Sea 200 nautical miles (370 km) south east of Buchan Ness, Aberdeenshire, United Kingdom. Her crew were rescued by HMS Pylades (Royal Navy). Anna Jacabina was on a voyage from Gothenburg, Sweden to London, United Kingdom.
Asia	Russia	The ship was driven ashore and wrecked at Dearness, Orkney Islands, United Kingdom. She was on a voyage from Arkhangelsk to Hull, Yorkshire, United Kingdom.
Juliana Catharina	Prussia	The ship was driven ashore and wrecked on Rousay, Orkney Islands with the loss of eight of her crew.

=== 29 October ===
List of shipwrecks: 29 October 1811
Ship	State	Description
Dispatch	United States	The ship was abandoned in the North Sea 70 nautical miles (130 km) south west of Domesnes, Norway. Her crew were rescued by Alfred (United Kingdom). Dispatch was on a voyage from Cronstadt, Russia to Dartmouth, Devon, United Kingdom.

=== 30 October ===
List of shipwrecks: 30 October 1811
Ship	State	Description
Catharina	Russia	The ship was driven ashore at Lunan, Forfarshire, United Kingdom with the loss of three of her crew. She was on a voyage from Saint Petersburg to London, United Kingdom.
Concordia	Lübeck	The ship was driven ashore and wrecked near Peterhead, Aberdeenshire, United Kingdom. Her seventeen crew were rescued by fishing boat. She was on a voyage from Memel, Prussia to London.
Enigheden	Sweden	The ship was driven ashore and wrecked at Peterhead. Her crew were rescued by a fishing boat. She was on a voyage from Memel to London.
Jewjiana	Flag unknown	The ship was wrecked on Sanday Orkney Islands.
Nymph	United Kingdom	The ship was wrecked on the Herd Sand, in the North Sea off County Durham. Her crew were rescued.
HMS Pylades	Royal Navy	The 18-gun sloop-of-war was driven ashore at Peterhead. She was later refloated.

=== 31 October ===
List of shipwrecks: 31 October 1811
Ship	State	Description
HMS Calypso	Royal Navy	The Cruizer-class brig-sloop was severely damaged in a storm off the Orkney Islands.
Ceres	United Kingdom	The ship was wrecked in Bridlington Bay.
Lady Petre	United Kingdom	The ship ran aground on the Newcombe Sand, in the North Sea off Great Yarmouth, Norfolk. She refloated but came ashore at Kirkley, Suffolk and was wrecked. Her crew were rescued. Lady Petre was on a voyage from Hull, Yorkshire to London.

=== Unknown date ===
List of shipwrecks: Unknown date in October 1811
Ship	State	Description
Adventure	United Kingdom	The brig was driven ashore and wrecked at Lowestoft, Suffolk.
Adventure	United Kingdom	The ship was driven ashore and wrecked at Villa do Conde, Portugal. She was on a voyage from Liverpool, Lancashire to Porto, Portugal.
Alexander	United Kingdom	The ship ran aground on Scroby Sands, Norfolk. She was on a voyage from Aberdeen to London. She was refloated and taken in to Great Yarmouth, Norfolk.
Amphitrite	United Kingdom	The ship foundered off Aberystwyth, Cardiganshire with the loss of all hands.
Aurora	United Kingdom	The ship was driven ashore at Formby, Lancashire. She was on a voyage from Limerick to Liverpool. Aurora was subsequently wrecked in a storm on 13 October.
Caroline	United States	The ship was abandoned in the Atlantic Ocean. She was later discovered by HMS Scorpion (Royal Navy) and taken in to Saint Thomas, Virgin Islands
Ceres	United Kingdom	The ship was wrecked near White Cliff, Isle of Wight. Her crew were rescued. She was on a voyage from Penryn, Cornwall to London.
Clio	United Kingdom	The ship foundered in the Baltic Sea. She was on a voyage from Stockholm, Sweden to Hull, Yorkshire.
Commerce	United Kingdom	The ship sank in the River Liffey at Dublin.
Country Squire	United Kingdom	The collier ran aground on the Knock Sand, in the North Sea off the coast of Kent. She was later refloated and prceeded to Newcastle upon Tyne, Northumberland.
Eagle	United Kingdom	The ship was wrecked at Amelia Island, East Florida, New Spain.
Edward	United Kingdom	The ship was driven ashore and wrecked on Tybee Island, Georgia, United States. She was on a voyage from Tybee Island to Portsmouth, Hampshire.
Fingal	United Kingdom	The ship was driven ashore near Miramichi, New Brunswick, British North America.
Fortuna	Russia	The ship was lost at Arkhangelsk.
Fortune	United Kingdom	The ship was wrecked on the Puercus Rocks, in Cádiz Bay. She was on a voyage from Gibraltar to Cádiz, Spain.
George	United Kingdom	The ship was driven ashore on Stroma, Scotland.
Hebe	United Kingdom	The ship was abandoned at sea. She was on a voyage from Memel, Prussia to London. She was subsequently discovered by HMS Pylades (Royal Navy), which tower her in to Aberdeen, where she arrived on 3 November.
Industry	United Kingdom	The brig was wrecked at Douglas Head, Isle of Man with the loss of all hands.
Maria	United Kingdom	The ship, homeported in Liverpool, was wrecked at Amelia Island.
Maria	United Kingdom	The ship, homeported in London, was wrecked at Amelia Island.
Mary	United Kingdom	The ship was lost on Amelia Island.
Mercurius	Russia	The ship foundered in the White Sea.
Neptune	United Kingdom	The smack was driven ashore on Spurn Point, Yorkshire. She was later refloated and taken into Hull, Yorkshire.
Regent	United Kingdom	The ship departed from Liverpool for Newfoundland, British North America in early October. No further trace, presumed foundered with the loss of all hands.
Richard	United Kingdom	The ship foundered in the Strait of Belle Isle. Her crew were rescued. She was on a voyage from Chaleur Bay, British North America to Whitehaven, Cumberland.
Vigilant	United Kingdom	The ship was lost in the English Bank, in the River Plate. She was on a voyage from Buenos Aires to London.
William	United States	The ship capsized in the Irish Sea off Holyhead, Anglesey, United Kingdom and came ashore. All hands were lost. She was on a voyage from Wilmington, Delaware to Dublin, United Kingdom.

== November ==
=== 1 November ===
List of shipwrecks: 1 November 1811
Ship	State	Description
Anna and Jacobina	Russia	The ship sprang a leak in the North Sea and was abandoned by her crew, who were rescued by HMS Pylades (Royal Navy).
Chesterfield	United Kingdom	The ship was driven ashore and wrecked at Rampside, Lancashire. Her crew survived. She was on a voyage from Jamaica to Liverpool, Lancashire.
Justitia	Flag unknown	The ship sprang a leak and was abandoned. Her crew were rescued by Prince of Wales (United Kingdom).
Minerva	Sweden	The ship was driven ashore and wrecked in the Orkney Islands, United Kingdom.
Royal Charlotte	United Kingdom	The ship was wrecked at Pembrey, Carmarthenshire with the loss of all hands.
Stadt Memel	Prussia	The ship was wrecked on Fetlar, Shetland Islands, United Kingdom with the loss of all but one of her thirteen crew.
Sussex Oak	United Kingdom	The ship was wrecked off Whitby, Yorkshire. Her crew were rescued. She was on a voyage from Chepstow, Monmouthshire to Whitby. Sussex Oak was later refloated and taken in to Whitby.

=== 2 November ===
List of shipwrecks: 2 November 1811
Ship	State	Description
Busy	United Kingdom	The sloop was wrecked on the Cornacker Rock, off Stonehaven, Aberdeenshire. All on board were rescued. She was on a voyage from Wick, Caithness to Leith, Lothian.
Catharina and Arabella	United Kingdom	The ship foundered in the Irish Sea off Whitehaven, Cumberland. She was on a voyage from Strangford, County Down to Liverpool, Lancashire.
Johanna	Russia	The ship was driven ashore and wrecked near Berwick upon Tweed, Northumberland, United Kingdom.

=== 3 November ===
List of shipwrecks: 3 November 1811
Ship	State	Description
Catherine and Arabella	United Kingdom	The ship was wrecked off Whitehaven, Cumberland. She was on a voyage from Strangford, County Down to Liverpool, Lancashire.

=== 4 November ===
List of shipwrecks: 4 November 1811
Ship	State	Description
Favourite	United Kingdom	The ship was wrecked off Black Sod, County Mayo. Her crew were rescued. She was on a voyage from Greenock, Renfrewshire to Limerick.
James	United Kingdom	The sloop struck a rock off Portpatrick, Wigtownshire and was wrecked with the loss of all six crew. She was on a voyage from Larne, County Antrim to Lancaster, Lancashire.
John and Mary	United Kingdom	The ship foundered in the Irish Sea off Cork. She was on a voyage from Cork to London.
Nestor	United Kingdom	The ship was wrecked off the Mull of Kintyre, Argyllshire.

=== 5 November ===
List of shipwrecks: 5 November 1811
Ship	State	Description
Diligent	United Kingdom	The ship was wrecked on the Robin Rigg Sandbank, in the Solway Firth.
James	United Kingdom	The sloop was wrecked near Port Patrick Wigtownshire.
Peggy	United Kingdom	The ship was driven ashore at Broadhill, Aberdeenshire. She was on a voyage from Aberdeen to Montrose, Forfarshire.
Primrose	United Kingdom	The brig foundered in the North Sea off Peterhead, Aberdeenshire.
HMS Pylades	Royal Navy	The Pylades-class ship-sloop was driven ashore at Peterhead.
James	United Kingdom	The sloop was wrecked in Portspittal Bay with the loss of all hands. She was on a voyage from Larne, County Antrim to Lancaster, Lancashire.

=== 6 November ===
List of shipwrecks: 6 November 1811
Ship	State	Description
Nymph	United Kingdom	The ship was wrecked on the Herd Sand, in the North Sea off South Shields, County Durham. Her crew were rescued.
Princess Elizabeth	United Kingdom	The ship was destroyed by fire at Alicante, Spain.

=== 7 November ===
List of shipwrecks: 7 November 1811
Ship	State	Description
Trojan	United States	The ship ran aground on rocks at Plymouth, Devon, United Kingdom. She refloated the next day and sank. The ship had been captured by HMS Armide (Royal Navy) whilst on a voyage from Bordeaux, Loire-Inférieure, France to Baltimore, Maryland and was sent in to Plymouth. She was refloated on 13 November.

=== 8 November ===
List of shipwrecks: 8 November 1811
Ship	State	Description
Richard and Ann	United Kingdom	The ship was driven ashore at Ramsgate, Kent. She was on a voyage from Blyth, Northumberland to London.

=== 11 November ===
List of shipwrecks: 11 November 1811
Ship	State	Description
Providence	United Kingdom	The ship was wrecked near Holyhead, Anglesey. Her crew were rescued. She was on a voyage from Liverpool, Lancashire to Newry, County Down.
Star	United Kingdom	The ship, a brig or brigantine, was wrecked at Trevose Head, Cornwall with the loss of all hands. She was on a voyage from St. Ubes, Portugal to Cork.

=== 14 November ===
List of shipwrecks: 14 November 1811
Ship	State	Description
Favorite	United Kingdom	The ship was driven ashore near "Clanderlaw". She was on a voyage from Limerick to Cádiz, Spain.
Ohio	United States	The ship was wrecked in the Plantain Garden River, Jamaica. She was on a voyage from Portsmouth, New Hampshire to Jamaica.

=== 15 November ===
List of shipwrecks: 15 November 1811
Ship	State	Description
Alexander	United Kingdom	The brig was wrecked near Lough Swilly.
Betsey	United Kingdom	The ship was driven ashore at Cairn. She was on a voyage from Dumbarton to Dublin.
Diana	United Kingdom	The ship was driven ashore at Cairn. She was on a voyage from Belfast, County Antrim to Glasgow, Renfrewshire.
Fanny	United Kingdom	The ship was wrecked on Düne.
Forsingbingin	(Denmark) Norway	The ship was driven ashore at Cairn. She was on a voyage from Norway to Liverpool, Lancashire.
Green Linnet	United Kingdom	The ship was driven ashore and werecked at Holyhead, Anglesey with the loss of all hands. She was on a voyage from Dublin to Liverpool.
Helena	United Kingdom	The brig was driven ashore at Hoylake Lancashire.
Joseph	United Kingdom	The ship was driven ashore at Cairn. She was on a voyage from Ayr to Dublin.
Marston	United Kingdom	The ship was driven ashore and wrecked south of St Bees Head, Cumberland with the loss of all seven crew.
Thomas and Lucy	United Kingdom	The sloop was driven ashore and wrecked at Milford Haven, Pembrokeshire. Her crew were rescued. She was on a voyage from Wexford to Milford Haven.
Unnamed	Denmark	The sloop was driven ashore on Düne.

=== 16 November ===
List of shipwrecks: 16 November 1811
Ship	State	Description
Aigle	United Kingdom	The privateer was burnt at Savannah, Georgia by the Americans.
Fanny	United Kingdom	The ship was wrecked on Düne. She was on a voyage from Hull, Yorkshire to Heligoland.
Orion	United Kingdom	The ship was driven ashore on the coast of Denmark.
Thalia	United Kingdom	The ship was driven ashore and wrecked at Margate, Kent. Her crew were rescued. She was on a voyage from Jamaica to London.
Vengeance	France	The privateer was burnt at Savannah, Georgia by the Americans.

=== 17 November ===
List of shipwrecks: 17 November 1811
Ship	State	Description
Exeter	United Kingdom	The ship was wrecked on the coast of Norfolk with the loss of all hands. She was on a voyage from Hull to Dover, Kent.

=== 18 November ===
List of shipwrecks: 18 November 1811
Ship	State	Description
Mary & Ellen	United Kingdom	The galiot foundered in Caernarvon Bay with the loss of all but one of her crew. She was on a voyage from Dublin to Liverpool, Lancashire.

=== 19 November ===
List of shipwrecks: 19 November 1811
Ship	State	Description
Andromeda	United Kingdom	The brig was driven ashore at "Beddwrarach", Anglesey. Her crew survived.
Green Linnet	United Kingdom	The sloop was driven ashore and wreked at Llanrhudlad, Anglesey with the loss of all hands.
James	United Kingdom	The ship departed from Milford Haven, Pembrokeshire for Jersey, Channel Islands. No further trace, presumed foundered with the loss of all hands.
Lady Castlreagh	United Kingdom	The ship ran aground at Kedgeree, India. She was refloated and taken in to Calcutta.
Orion	Sweden	The ship was driven ashore on the Danish coast.
Unity	United Kingdom	The ship was driven ashore and wrecked at Tenerife, Canary Islands.
Unnamed	United Kingdom	The packet ship was abandoned off Holyhead, Anglesey. All on board were rescued bythe Holyhead Lifeboat.

=== 21 November ===
List of shipwrecks: 21 November 1811
Ship	State	Description
Progress	United Kingdom	The ship was wrecked on the coast of Labrador, British North America. She was on a voyage from Quebec City, Lower Canada, British North America to London.

=== 22 November ===
List of shipwrecks: 22 November 1811
Ship	State	Description
Caldicat	United Kingdom	The ship sprang a leak in the Gulf of St Lawrence and was abandoned by her crew. She was on a voyage from Quebec City, Lower Canada, British North America to London.

=== 23 November ===
List of shipwrecks: 23 November 1811
Ship	State	Description
Nautilus	United Kingdom	The ship ran aground on the Goodwin Sands, Kent. She was on a voyage from South Shields, County Durham to Grenada. She was refloated the next day and taken in to The Downs in a leaky condition.

=== 24 November ===
List of shipwrecks: 24 November 1811
Ship	State	Description
Alicia	United Kingdom	Napoleonic Wars: The ship was captured by the privateer Brestoise (France). She was subsequently wrecked at Penmarc'h, Finistère, France. Alicia was on a voyage from Saint Kitts to Dublin.
Brilliant Star	United Kingdom	The ship struck the Black Rocks, off Ouessant, Finistère, France and was wrecked. Her crew survived. She was on a voyage from Plymouth, Devon to Lisbon, Portugal

=== 25 November ===
List of shipwrecks: 26 November 1811
Ship	State	Description
Mary Ellen	United Kingdom	The galiot foundered in Carnarvon Bay with the loss of all but one of those on board.

=== 27 November ===
List of shipwrecks: 27 November 1811
Ship	State	Description
Don Alonzo	Flag unknown	The ship foundered off the east coast of the United States. She was on a voyage from Amelia Island, East Florida to London, United Kingdom.
St. Andrew	United Kingdom	The ship was wrecked in Rio Nova Bay, Jamaica.

=== 28 November ===
List of shipwrecks: 28 November 1811
Ship	State	Description
Eliza	United Kingdom	The ship was driven ashore in the River Plate.

=== 30 November ===
List of shipwrecks: 30 November 1811
Ship	State	Description
Flore	French Navy	The Armide-class frigate was wrecked off Chioggia, Venetian Province with the loss of 75 of her crew.
Jessy and Nancy	United Kingdom	The ship sprang a leak and foundered in the North Sea off Dunbar, Lothian. Her crew were rescued. She was on a voyage from Newcastle upon Tyne, Northumberland to Leith, Lothian.

=== Unknown date ===
List of shipwrecks: Unknown date in November 1811
Ship	State	Description
Acorn	United Kingdom	The ship was driven ashore at Newhaven, Sussex.
Active	United States	The ship ran aground and sank at Savannah, Georgia. She was on a voyage from Lisbon, Portugal to Savannah.
Apostle	Russia	The ship capsized in the North Sea with the loss of all hands.
Avis	United Kingdom	The ship was driven ashore and wrecked at Lytham St Annes, Lancashire. She was on a voyage from New Brunswick, British North America to Liverpool, Lancashire.
Christina	United Kingdom	The ship was driven ashore in Lunan Bay.
Comfort	United Kingdom	The ship was driven ashore and wrecked at Pwllheli, Caernarfonshire. She was on a voyage from Wiscasset, Maine, United States to Liverpool.
Cumberland	United Kingdom	The full-rigged ship was wrecked in the Gulf of St. Lawrence.
Dædalus	United Kingdom	The barque was wrecked in the Gulf of St. Lawrence.
Diana	Russia	The ship was driven ashore and severely damaged near Blyth, Northumberland, United Kingdom. She was later refloated.
Drie Trahit	Denmark–Norway	The ship sprang a leak off the Orkney Islands, United Kingdom of Great Britain and Ireland and was abandoned by her crew.
Eagle	United Kingdom	The ship was driven ashore near Maryport, Cumberland.
Eenar Tumbersheelver	(Denmark) Norway	The ship was wrecked on Islay, Inner Hebrides, United Kingdom.
Eglintoune	United Kingdom	The ship was abandoned in the Atlantic Ocean (42°00′N 43°54′W). Eleven of her crew were rescued by Maria (United Kingdom). Eglington was later boarded by six crew of Cumberland (United Kingdom) but had to be abandoned again some days later. The second crew were rescued by Packet (United States). Crews from Cumberland and Packet managed to take Eglingtoune in to Cowes, Isle of Wight. She had been on a voyage from Saint Vincent to London.
Elizabeth	United Kingdom	The ship was driven ashore near Nefyn, Caernarvonshire. She was on a voyage from Waterford to Liverpool. Elizabeth was later refloated.
Eugenia	United Kingdom	The ship was lost in the Orkney Islands.
Favourite Sally	United Kingdom	The ship was driven ashore and wrecked at Porthculmon, Caernarfonshire with the loss of two of her crew. She was on a voyage from Miramichi Bay, British North America to Workington, Cumberland.
Fletcher	United Kingdom	The ship was driven ashore and wrecked at Southport, Lancashire with the loss of nine of her crew. She was on a voyage from Miramichi Bay to Liverpool.
Jean	United Kingdom	The ship was driven ashore in Ramsey Bay, Isle of Man. she was on a voyage from Cork to Belfast, County Antrim.
Haabet	Flag unknown	The ship was wrecked on the coast of Jutland with the loss of a crew member. She was on a voyage from Memel, Prussia to London.
Haabet	Prussia	The ship was abandoned in the North Sea (55°33′N 3°09′E). She was on a voyage from Memel to London. Haabet was later taken in to the Humber by HMS Chanticleer (Royal Navy).
Lady Madison	United States	The full-rigged ship was driven ashore at Crinan, Argyllshire, United Kingdom. She was on a voyage from Saint Petersburgh, Russia to Liverpool.
London	United Kingdom	The ship was wrecked near Cape South, British North America with the loss of seven of her seventeen crew. Survivors were rescued by Harmony (United Kingdom).
Lonsdale	United Kingdom	The ship was driven ashore at Saltcoats, Ayrshire. She was on a voyage from North America to Whitehaven, Cumberland.
Padstow	United Kingdom	The ship was driven ashore and wrecked at Lytham St Annes. She was on a voyage from Malta to Liverpool.
Peggy	United Kingdom	The ship was driven ashore in the Saint Lawrence River. She was later refloated and taken in to Quebec City, Lower Canada, British North America.
Pitfour	United Kingdom	The ship, a cartel, ran aground at the mouth of the Eider. She was refloated three days later.
Prince George	United Kingdom	The ship was wrecked on "Camarasky Island", in the Gulf of St. Lawrence towards the end of November.
Sally	United Kingdom	The ship was wrecked on the coast of Norway.
Skorow	Russia	The ship was lost on Hogland in mid-November.
Speculation	United Kingdom	The ship was lost in the Orkney Islands in early November.
Thomas & Ann	United Kingdom	The ship was driven ashore near Harwich, Essex. She was refloated on 11 November.
Three Friends	United States	The ship was captured and burnt by two French frigates before 21 November.
Twa Systrar	Sweden	The ship was wrecked 4 nautical miles (7.4 km) north of Marstrand. She was on a voyage from Hull, Yorkshire to Gävle.
Two Brothers	United Kingdom	The ship was driven ashore in the River Alt. She was on a voyage from Whitehaven, Cumberland to Liverpool.
Walfarden	Sweden	The ship was driven ashore and wrecked in the Orkney Islands.
William	United States	The full-rigged ship was driven ashore and wrecked at Holyhead, Anglesey, United Kingdom with the loss of all hands.
Young Bartholomew	United Kingdom	The ship was lost in the White Sea.
Four unnamed vessels	Flags unknown	The brigs were driven ashore at Crinan.

== December ==
=== 1 December ===
List of shipwrecks: 1 December 1811
Ship	State	Description
Albion	United Kingdom	The ship was driven ashore in Tramore Bay. She was on a voyage from London to Waterford. Albion was refloated on 31 December.
Anna Maria	United Kingdom	The ship departed from King's Lynn, Norfolk for Sunderland, County Durham. No further trace, presumed foundered in the North Sea with the loss of all hands.
Argo	United Kingdom	The ship was driven ashore at Allonby, Cumberland. She was on a voyage from Cork to Workington, Cumberland.
Aurora	United Kingdom	The ship was wrecked at Land's End, Cornwall with the loss of two of her crew. She was on a voyage from Lisbon, Portugal to London.
Friends	United Kingdom	The ship was wrecked on Scroby Sands, Norfolk. Her crew were rescued. She was on a voyage from Blyth, Northumberland to London.
Lively	United Kingdom	The ship departed from King's Lynn for Newcastle upon Tyne, Northumberland. No further trace, presumed foundered in the North Sea with the loss of all hands.
Oceanus	Danzig	The ship was wrecked in the Orkney Islands, United Kingdom with the loss of all hands.

=== 2 December ===
List of shipwrecks: 2 December 1811
Ship	State	Description
Christine	Denmark–Norway	The ship was wrecked at Stromness, Orkney Islands, United Kingdom. She was on a voyage from Liverpool, Lancashire, United Kingdom to Flensburg.
Clementson	United Kingdom	The ship was driven ashore near Ravenglass, Cumberland. She was later refloated.
Fingal	United Kingdom	The snow was wrecked on the Dunnet Sands, in the North Sea off Thurso, Caithness with the loss of all hands. She was on a voyage from Miramichi Bay to London.
Florida	United Kingdom	The ship was driven ashore and wrecked at Margate, Kent.. Her crew survived. She was on a voyage from London to Amelia Island, East Florida, New Spain.
Jenny	United Kingdom	The ship was driven ashore at Freshwater, Isle of Wight. She was on a voyage from Youghal, County Cork to Southampton, Hampshire.

=== 3 December ===
List of shipwrecks: 3 December 1811
Ship	State	Description
Betties and Susan	United Kingdom	The brig departed from Newcastle upon Tyne, Northumberland. No further trace, possibly foundered off Inchcape on 4 or 5 December with the loss of all on board.
HMS Thrasher	Royal Navy	The brig ran aground at the mouth of the Elbe. She was refloated and taken in to Heligoland, where she arrived on 5 December.

=== 4 December ===
List of shipwrecks: 4 December 1811
Ship	State	Description
Aramanthe	Sweden	The ship was wrecked on Sanday, Orkney Islands, United Kingdom.
Goodintent	United Kingdom	The ship was driven ashore near Stornoway, Isle of Lewis, Outer Hebrides. She was on a voyage from Quebec City, Lower Canada, British North America to London.
Hebe	United Kingdom	The packet ship was wrecked at Barmouth, Merionethshire with the loss of all but three of her crew. She was on a voyage from Great Yarmouth, Norfolk to Dublin.
Louisa	United Kingdom	The ship sprang a leak in the North Sea and was abandoned by her crew. She was on a voyage from London to Newcastle upon Tyne, Northumberland.
Magnet	United Kingdom	The brig was wrecked near Padstow, Cornwall. She was on a voyage from Alicante, Spain to London.
Mars	United Kingdom	The ship was driven ashore at Enes, County Mayo. Her crew were rescued. She was on a voyage from New Providence, New Jersey, United States to Glasgow, Renfrewshire.
Padgy	United Kingdom	The ship departed from Portsmouth, Hampshire for Caernarfon. No further trace, presumed foundered with the loss of all hands.
HMS Saldanha	Royal Navy	The Apollo-class frigate was wrecked in Lough Swilly with the loss of all 253 of her crew.
Union	United Kingdom	The ship was wrecked on the north of the Isle of Lewis, Outer Hebrides with the loss of all hands. She was on a voyage from Quebec City to London.
Young Charles	United Kingdom	The ship was driven ashore and wrecked at Cardigan. She was on a voyage from London to Dublin.
Unnamed	United Kingdom	The brig was driven ashore and wrecked near Newquay, Cornwall with the loss of at least four lives.

=== 5 December ===
List of shipwrecks: 5 December 1811
Ship	State	Description
Chance	United Kingdom	The brig was wrecked at Whitby, Yorkshire. Her crew were rescued.
Florida	United Kingdom	The ship struck a rock off Margate, Kent and was abandoned by her crew. She was on a voyage from London to Amelia Island, East Florida.

=== 6 December ===
List of shipwrecks: 6 December 1811
Ship	State	Description
Lord Nelson	United Kingdom	The packet ship foundered off Milford Haven, Pembrokeshire whilst at anchor and crewless.

=== 7 December ===
List of shipwrecks: 7 December 1811
Ship	State	Description
Jane	United Kingdom	The brig was driven ashore and wrecked at Seaford, Sussex.
New Wall	United Kingdom	The ship was driven ashore at Newhaven, Sussex. Her crew were rescued. She was on a voyage from Chichester, Sussex to Shoreham-by-Sea, Sussex.

=== 8 December ===
List of shipwrecks: 8 December 1811
Ship	State	Description
Hebe	United States	The ship was wrecked on the Isle of Lewis, Outer Hebrides, United Kingdom. She was on a voyage from Stockholm, or Gothenburg, Sweden to Baltimore, Maryland.
Prince Augustus	United Kingdom	The sloop was wrecked at Derbyhaven, Isle of Man. She was on a voyage from Liverpool, Lancashire to Douglas, Isle of Man.

=== 9 December ===
List of shipwrecks: 9 December 1811
Ship	State	Description
Nancy	United Kingdom	The ship was lost on the Berlengas, Portugal with the loss of two of her crew. She was on a voyage from Cork to Lisbon, Portugal.

=== 10 December ===
List of shipwrecks: 10 December 1811
Ship	State	Description
Destimido	United Kingdom	The ship was sunk by a shot from the Loo Fort, Madeira.
Elizabeth	United Kingdom	The ship was wrecked on the coast of Cuba.
Peggy	United Kingdom	The ship foundered in the Atlantic Ocean off Fowey, Cornwall. Her crew were rescued. She was on a voyage from Plymouth, Devon to Neath, Glamorgan.

=== 11 December ===
List of shipwrecks: 11 December 1811
Ship	State	Description
Aurora		A total loss when stranded on the Seven Stones Reef between Cornwall and the Isles of Scilly while carrying cork from Lisbon to Cork

=== 13 December ===
List of shipwrecks: 13 December 1811
Ship	State	Description
Eliza	United Kingdom	The ship was lost near North Berwick, Berwickshire. She was on a voyage from Eyemouth, Berwickshire to Grangemouth, Stirlingshire.
Regulator	United Kingdom	The ship was driven ashore near Torrevieja, Spain. She was on a voyage from Spain to London.

=== 14 December ===
List of shipwrecks: 14 December 1811
Ship	State	Description
Britannia	United Kingdom	The ship capsized at Liverpool, Lancashire.
Jubilee	United Kingdom	The brig was driven ashore and wrecked at Burnham Overy Staithe, Norfolk.

=== 15 December ===
List of shipwrecks: 15 December 1811
Ship	State	Description
Hero	United Kingdom	The ship was driven ashore near Limerick.
Jason	United Kingdom	The ship struck a rock and sank in the River Suir. Her crew were rescued. She was on a voyage from Newfoundland, British North America to Waterford.
Mary	United Kingdom	The ship was driven ashore in the River Shannon. She was on a voyage from Limerick to London.
Polly	United States	The brig capsized in the Atlantic Ocean. She was dismasted and righted herself in a waterlogged state, kept afloat by her cargo of timber. The wreck remained adrift until 19 June 1812, when the remaining two members of her crew were rescued by Fame (United Kingdom).
HMS Regulus	Royal Navy	The Roebuck-class ship ran aground off Great Yarmouth, Norfolk. She was on a voyage from Portsmouth, Hampshire to Leith, Lothian. She was refloated and departed for the Nore on 17 December.

=== 16 December ===
List of shipwrecks: 16 December 1811
Ship	State	Description
Thomas and Mary	United Kingdom	The ship was wrecked on the coast of Anglesey with the loss of her captain. She was on a voyage from Wexford to Dublin.
Thornton	United Kingdom	The ship was wrecked on the Burbo Sandbank, in the Solway Firth. Her crew were rescued. She was on a voyage from Maranhão, Brazil to Liverpool, Lancashire.
Venus	United Kingdom	The ship was driven ashore and wrecked at Aberdovey, Merionethshire. She was on a voyage from Malta to Liverpool.

=== 17 December ===
List of shipwrecks: 17 December 1811
Ship	State	Description
Harmony	United Kingdom	The ship was wrecked on The Manacles. She was on a voyage from Waterford to Rye, Sussex.
Unnamed	Spain	The ship was driven ashore at North Meols, Lancashire, United Kingdom.

=== 18 December ===
List of shipwrecks: 18 December 1811
Ship	State	Description
Dolphin	United Kingdom	The ship foundered off Faro, Portugal. She was on a voyage from Dénia, Spain to Bristol, Gloucestershire.
Mary and Margaret	United Kingdom	The ship was driven ashore at Lymington, Hampshire. She was on a voyage from London to Dublin. She was later refloated.

=== 19 December ===
List of shipwrecks: 19 December 1811
Ship	State	Description
Betsey	United Kingdom	The ship foundered in the North Sea off Robin Hoods Bay. Her crew were rescued. She was on a voyage from South Shields, County Durham to London.
Edgell	United Kingdom	The ship was lost at St. John's, Newfoundland, She was on a voyage from London to St. John's.
Magnet	United Kingdom	The ship was driven ashore and wrecked at Filey, Yorkshire. She was on a voyage from Sunderland, County Durham to Southampton, Hampshire.
Rebecca	United States	The ship was wrecked on the coast of Cuba. She was on a voyage from Jamaica to New York.
Tsar Konstantin (Царь Константин)	Imperial Russian Navy	The brig ran aground off Anapa and was abandoned by her crew. She capsized by 21 December and broke up in a storm on 9 January 1812.
Unnamed	Flag unknown	The polacca was driven ashore at Southsea, Hampshire, United Kingdom. She was refloated the next day and taken in to Spithead, Hampshire.

=== 21 December ===
List of shipwrecks: 21 December 1811
Ship	State	Description
Lubentina	United Kingdom	The ship was driven ashore and wrecked on Düne. Her crew survived.
Pallas	United Kingdom	The ship was lost near Sunderland, County Durham. She was on a voyage from Great Yarmouth, Norfolk to Leith, Lothian.
Stanley	United Kingdom	The ship was wrecked at "West Hoyle" with the loss of all hands. She was on a voyage from Liverpool, Lancashire to Amlwch, Anglesey.
Success	United Kingdom	The ship departed Newport, Monmouthshire for Waterford. No further trace, presumed foundered in the Irish Sea with the loss of all hands.
Unnamed	(France) French First Republic	The ship was driven ashore and wrecked on Düne with the loss of her captain.

=== 22 December ===
List of shipwrecks: 22 December 1811
Ship	State	Description
Phoenix	United Kingdom	The transport ship was driven ashore at Plymouth, Devon.

=== 23 December ===
List of shipwrecks: 23 December 1811
Ship	State	Description
Blue Bentia	United Kingdom	The ship was driven ashore on Düne. She was on a voyage from London to Heligoland.
Henrietta Eliza	Heligoland	The ship was driven ashore on Düne. She was on a voyage from Heligoland to London.
Unnamed	Denmark	The brig was wrecked at sea with the loss of a crew member. She was on a voyage from a Norwegian port to Portsmouth, Hampshire, United Kingdom. She was taken in to Heligoland on 27 December.

=== 24 December ===
List of shipwrecks: 24 December 1811
Ship	State	Description
HMS Defence	Royal Navy	The Bellona-class ship of the line was driven ashore and wrecked at Ringkøbing, Denmark with the loss of 583 of her 597 crew.
Giertru Chrestiane	(Denmark) Norway	The ship struck the Lemon and Ower Sand, in the North Sea and was wrecked. Her crew took to the boats and were rescued the next day by Amphitrite (United Kingdom).
HMS St George	Royal Navy	The Duke-class ship of the line was driven ashore and wrecked at Ringkøbing with the loss of 731 of her 738 crew.

=== 25 December ===
List of shipwrecks: 25 December 1811
Ship	State	Description
Archimedes	United Kingdom	The transport ship, a brig was wrecked on Texel, Zuyderzée, France. There were 20 survivors.
Buckman	United States	The ship foundered in the North Sea off Texel with the loss of 14 of her crew.
Centurion	United Kingdom	The transport ship was lost oft Texel with the loss of all hands.
USS Essex	United States Navy	The frigate grounded on a sandbar during a winter storm while anchored off the Bluffs outside the harbor at Newport, Rhode Island. She refloated herself several hours later after the weather improved. One crewman froze to death in his hammock.
Flora	United Kingdom	The transport ship foundered in the North Sea off Texel with the loss of most of her crew.
HMS Hero	Royal Navy	HMS Hero. The Fame-class ship of the line was wrecked on the Haaks Sand, in the North Sea off Texel. There were twelve survivors.
Rosina	United Kingdom	The ship foundered in the North Sea off Texel with the loss of her master and 17 of her crew.

=== 27 December ===
List of shipwrecks: 27 December 1811
Ship	State	Description
Sarah	United Kingdom	The ship was driven ashore and wrecked near Aldeburgh, Suffolk. She was on a voyage from London to Leeds, Yorkshire.

=== 28 December ===
List of shipwrecks: 28 December 1811
Ship	State	Description
John	United Kingdom	The ship was wrecked in the River Erne. She was on a voyage from Liverpool, Lancashire to Ballyshannon, County Donegal.

=== 29 December ===
List of shipwrecks: 29 December 1811
Ship	State	Description
Crotyden	United Kingdom	The ship was driven ashore on the coast of Paraíba, Brazil. She was on a voyage from London to Rio de Janeiro.
Rosa	United Kingdom	The ship departed from Barbados for La Guaira, Captaincy General of Venezuela, No further trace, presumed foundered with the loss of all hands.

=== Unknown date ===
List of shipwrecks: Unknown date in December 1811
Ship	State	Description
Achilles	Russia	The ship foundered in the Baltic Sea.
Alexander	United Kingdom	The ship sprang a leak in the Baltic Sea and was abandoned by her crew.
Alfred	United Kingdom	The ship was driven ashore near Liverpool, Lancashire. She was on a voyage from Liverpool to New Orleans, Louisiana, United States. She was refloated and put back to Liverpool.
Alknomac	United Kingdom	The ship was wrecked on Martha's Vineyard, Massachusetts, United States in mid-December. She was on a voyage from Ireland to New York, United States.
America	United States	The ship sank in the St. Lawrence River. Her crew were rescued.
Amphitrite	United Kingdom	The ship was driven ashore and wrecked at Caernarfon before 16 December. She was on a voyage from Liverpool to Bristol, Gloucestershire.
Ann	United Kingdom	The ship sprang a leak and was abandoned off Huelva, Spain. She was on a voyage from Gibraltar to Lisbon, Portugal.
Anna Charlotta	Russia	The ship was wrecked at Falsterbo, Sweden.
Behkeshow	Russia	The ship was driven ashore on the Baltic coast.
British Queen	United Kingdom	The ship was wrecked at Stromness, Orkney Islands.
Brothers	United Kingdom	The ship was abandoned in the North Sea whilst on a voyage from London to Montrose, Forfarshire. She subsequently came ashore at Arbroath, Forfarshire. Brothers was subsequently refloated.
Brutus	United Kingdom	The ship sprang a leak in the Atlantic Ocean and was abandoned. Her crew were rescued by James & David (United Kingdom). Brutus was on a voyage from Quebec City, Lower Canada, British North America to Hull, Yorkshire.
Cæsar	United Kingdom	The ship was driven ashore and wrecked at Hoylake, Lancashire. She was on a voyage from Wiscasset, Maine, United States to Dublin.
Carolina	(Russian Empire) Grand Duchy of Finland	The ship was driven ashore on the Baltic coast.
Delight	United Kingdom	The ship was wrecked in the North Channel.
Diana	United Kingdom	The ship foundered in the Baltic Sea.
Earl Bathurst	United Kingdom	The ship was wrecked at Pensacola, East Florida, New Spain.
Echo	United Kingdom	The ship foundered in the Baltic Sea.
Edward	United Kingdom	The ship foundered between Tenerife and Lanzarote, Canary Islands.
Elizabeth	United Kingdom	The ship was driven ashore at Lough Swilly, County Donegal. She was on a voyage from Belfast, County Antrim to Amelia Island, East Florida, New Spain.
Ellen	United Kingdom	The ship was wrecked on Lady Isle, Ayrshire. She was on a voyage from Dominica to the Clyde.
Estrella do Mar	Portugal	The ship was wrecked on Lundy Island, Devon, United Kingdom. Her crew were rescued. She was on a voyage from St. Ubes to Bristol.
Experiment	United Kingdom	The ship was driven ashore near Dungeness, Kent. She was on a voyage from London to Bristol. She was refloated and put into Dover, Kent, where she arrived on 19 Dece ber.
Fair Weather	United Kingdom	The ship was wrecked at Amelia Island.
Friendship	United Kingdom	The ship was driven ashore in the Saint Lawrence River.
Gallant Schemer	United Kingdom	The ship was driven ashore at Sheerness, Kent. She was on a voyage from Smyrna, Greece to London.
George and Ann	United Kingdom	The ship collided with the pier at Liverpool and sank.
Good Intent	United Kingdom	The ship was driven ashore and wrecked at Portsmouth, Hampshire.
Goodintent	United Kingdom	The ship was holed by an anchor and sank at Holyhead, Anglesey. she was on a voyage from Newry, County Antrim to Liverpool.
Gute Erwartung	Prussia	The ship was wrecked in the Orkney Islands.
Hannibal	Sweden	The ship was driven ashore on the Baltic coast.
Hero	Sweden	The ship foundered in the Baltic Sea.
Hope	United Kingdom	The ship was driven ashore and wrecked at Cala, Spain. Her crew were rescued. She was on a voyage from Gibraltar to the Barbary Coast.
Hope	United Kingdom	The ship was lost whilst on a voyage from Kingston, Jamaica to Caracas, Captaincy General of Venezuela.
Industry	United Kingdom	Napoleonic Wars: The ship was captured by a French privateer and scuttled. She was on a voyage from Viana do Castelo, Portugal to Teignmouth, Devon.
John and Thomas	United Kingdom	The ship foundered in the Atlantic Ocean off County Donegal with the loss of three of her crew.
Juffrouw Anna	(Denmark) Norway	The ship was wrecked on the Isle of Mull, Inner Hebrides, United Kingdom.
Lady Gambier	United Kingdom	The ship was driven ashore at Belém, Brazil. She was on a voyage from London to Lisbon and Brazil.
LLoyd's	United Kingdom	The ship ran aground on the Brake Sand. She was on a voyage from London to Jamaica. She was refloated and put back to the River Thames.
Lucca Maria	Russia	The ship was driven ashore on the Baltic coast.
Medea	United Kingdom	The ship was driven ashore and wrecked on the Isle of Lewis, Outer Hebrides.
Maria	United Kingdom	The ship departed from Cork for Liverpool. No further trace, presumed foundered with the loss of all hands.
Ocean	United Kingdom	The ship was driven ashore at Saltfleet, Lincolnshire. She was on a voyage from London to Leeds, Yorkshire.
Pallas	United States	The ship was driven ashore at Lough Swilly.
Pitt	United Kingdom	The ship was lost on the Irish coast.
Providence	United Kingdom	The ship was driven ashore in Kirkcudbright Bay.
Resolution	United Kingdom	The ship was driven ashore near Workington, Cumberland. She was later refloated.
Sally	United Kingdom	The ship was driven ashore in Kirkcudbright Bay.
Samuel Braddick	United Kingdom	The ship ran aground on the Hoyle Bank, in Liverpool Bay. She was on a voyage from Liverpool to "Bahi". She was refloated and put back to Liverpool.
Sarah	United Kingdom	The ship was driven ashore in Kirkcudbright Bay.
Six Brothers	United Kingdom	The ship foundered in Caernarvon Bay. She was on a voyage from caernarfon to Bristol.
Spring	United Kingdom	The ship foundered in the Baltic Sea.
Telegraph	United States	The ship was captured and burnt by Méduse and Nymphe (both French Navy). She was on a voyage from New York to Lisbon.
Trelawney Planter	United Kingdom	The ship was wrecked on Cape Breton Island, British North America early in December.
Valiant	United Kingdom	The brig was driven ashore and wrecked at Portsmouth.
Watsegamnie	Russia	The ship was driven ashore on the Baltic coast.

== Unknown date ==
List of shipwrecks: Unknown date in 1811
Ship	State	Description
Abeona	United States	The ship was wrecked on Cape Cod, Massachusetts. Her crew were rescued.
Adamant	United Kingdom	The ship was lost near Cape Sable, Nova Scotia, British North America with the loss of most of her crew. She was on a voyage from Pictou, Nova Scotia to Leith, Scotland.
Admiral Nelson	United Kingdom	The schooner departed from Newfoundland, British North America in October or November. No further trace, presumed foundered with the loss of all hands.
Ajax	United Kingdom	The ship was wrecked in the Saint Lawrence River.
Ann	United Kingdom	The ship was lost in the River Plate.
Anna	United Kingdom	The cartel was lost in the Bay of Bengal on the coast of Bengal at Chittagong during a voyage from Isle de France to France, apparently sometime in 1811.
Argo	United Kingdom	The ship was sunk by ice off the coast of Newfoundland.
Atlantic	United States	The ship was driven ashore on Tybee Island, Georgia. She was on a voyage from Lisbon, Portugal to Savannah, Georgia.
Belle Air	United States	The ship was lost near Egg Harbour, New Jersey. Her crew were rescued. She was on a voyage from Norway to Cork, Ireland and Philadelphia, Pennsylvania.
Blanchard	United Kingdom	The ship was lost near Maranhão, Brazil.
Brutus	United Kingdom	The ship was lost in the River Plate. She was on a voyage from the River Plate to a British port.
Chance	United Kingdom	The ship was lost at Maranhão. She was on a voyage from Rio de Janeiro to Maranhão.
Charles	United Kingdom	The ship foundered whilst on a voyage from the Persian Gulf to Bengal.
Edward	United Kingdom	The ship was lost at Savannah, Georgia.
Eliza	United Kingdom	The ship was lost in the River Plate before 5 November.
Florenza	United Kingdom	The ship was wrecked on Cape Cod, Massachusetts, United States. She was on a voyage from London to Boston, Massachusetts.
Four Brothers	United States	The ship was lost at Cape Cod.
Fowey	United Kingdom	The ship was lost on the coast of Newfoundland. She was on a voyage from St. John's, Newfoundland to Prince Edward Island, British North America.
Governor Thompson	United Kingdom	The ship was driven ashore in the Rio Pongos. She was on a voyage from Africa to London.
Harmony	United Kingdom	The ship was lost in the River Plate before 5 November.
Harmony	United Kingdom	The ship was lost in the Turks Islands.
Hannah	(United Kingdom of Great Britain and Ireland) British North America	The ship was lost on the coast of Newfoundland.
Harriet	United Kingdom	The ship lost her rudder and was abandoned by her crew. She was on a voyage from Jamaica to London.
Henrick	Russia	The ship was wrecked on Great Wrango Island.
Hope	United States	The brig capsized whilst on a voyage from the United States to Lisbon.
Industry	(United Kingdom of Great Britain and Ireland) British North America	The schooner sprang a leak and was abandoned in the Atlantic Ocean. Her crew were rescued by Kingston (United Kingdom).
John	United Kingdom	The ship sprang a leak and was abandoned in the Atlantic Ocean 500 nautical miles (930 km) west of Cape Clear Island, County Cork.
Kitty	United Kingdom	The ship was lost near the Cape of Good Hope in late July or early August. She was on a voyage from the Cape of Good Hope to the Isle de France, Mauritius.
Konigsburgh	United Kingdom	The whaler was lost in the Davis Straits.
Levi	United States	The ship was driven ashore south of Savannah, Georgia. She was on a voyage from Savannah to Portsmouth, New Hampshire.
Lioness	United States	The brig was wrecked on a reef off Anegada, Virgin Islands.
London	United Kingdom	The packet ship was lost near Cape South, British North America with the loss of seven of her seventeen crew. Survivors were rescued by Harmony (United Kingdom).
Lovely Matilda	United States	The ship foundered whilst on a voyage from Arkhangelsk, Russia to Philadelphia, Pennsylvania. Her crew were rescued.
Lucy and Elizabeth	United States	The ship was lost near New York. She was on a voyage from Lisbon to New York.
Magdalena	Spanish Navy	The frigate was wrecked at Jamaica with great loss of life.
Margaret	United Kingdom	The ship was driven ashore at Gaspé, Lower Canada, British North America. She was on a voyage from Liverpool to Quebec City, Lower Canada.
Margaretta	United Kingdom	The ship was lost in the River Plate before 5 November.
Mary	United Kingdom	The ship was lost 60 nautical miles (110 km) west of Demerara. Her crew were rescued. She was on a voyage from Demerara to Bristol, Gloucestershire.
Matilda	United States	The ship foundered in the Atlantic Ocean 60 nautical miles (110 km) south east of Philadelphia, Pennsylvania. She was on a voyage from Tenerife, Canary Islands to Baltimore, Maryland.
Mercator	United States	The ship was abandoned by her crew whilst on a voyage from Amelia Island, East Florida to Chatham, Massachusetts.
Minerva	United Kingdom	The ship was driven ashore and wrecked between New York and Philadelphia, Pennsylvania. Her crew were rescued. She was on a voyage from London to Virginia, United States.
Montgomery	United Kingdom	The ship was wrecked on Bermuda with the loss of three of her seven crew.
Morina	Kingdom of Naples	The ship foundered between Saint Pierre Island and Miquelon. She was on a voyage from Naples to New York.
Neutrality	United Kingdom	The ship was driven ashore and wrecked near Cape Cod, Massachusetts. She was on a voyage from Liverpool, Lancashire to Boston, Massachusetts.
North Star	United Kingdom	The ship was wrecked on Amelia Island, East Florida, New Spain.
Ocean	British East India Company	The East Indiaman foundered off "Puolo Sapate", Netherlands East Indies.
Olive Branch	United Kingdom	The ship was wrecked on Long Island, New York, United States. All on board were rescued. She was on a voyage from Liverpool to New York City.
Palermo	Spanish Navy	The brig was wrecked at Jamaica with great loss of life.
Pearl	United Kingdom	The ship was in collision with another vessel and foundered in the Grand Banks of Newfoundland. She was on a voyage from St. Andrew, New Brunswick, British North America to Campbeltown, Argyllshire.
Phœbe	United States	The schooner was destroyed by fire off St. Jago de Cuba. Her crew were rescued.
Pike	United Kingdom	The ship was lost near Saint Vincent. She was on a voyage from Suriname to Barbados and London.
Port of Sunderland	United Kingdom	The ship was driven ashore in the Gut of Canso.
Providence	United Kingdom	The ship was lost in the Saint Lawrence River.
Sally	United Kingdom	The schooner was wrecked in the River Plate.
Sally and Betsey	United States	The ship was wrecked on the east coast of the United States. She was on a voyage from the Mediterranean to the United States
Samuel Gambler	United Kingdom	The ship was wrecked at the Cape of Good Hope.
Sir James Cockburn	United Kingdom	Napoleonic Wars: The ship was captured and sunk by the privateer Diligente (France). She was on a voyage from Kingston, Jamaica to Curaçao.
Speedwell	United Kingdom	The ship was wrecked on the coast of Labrador, British North America.
HMS Toronto	Royal Navy	The schooner was wrecked in Lake Ontario off Hanlan's Point, British North America.
Triton	United Kingdom	The ship was lost on the coast of America.
Varuna	United Kingdom	The ship disappeared, probably in a typhoon, in the China Sea.
Vigilant	United States	The brig was abandoned whilst on a voyage from Castine, Maine to the West Indies.
Young	United Kingdom	The ship foundered in the White Sea.
Young Factor	United Kingdom	The ship was lost at Wilmington, Delaware, United States. She was on a voyage from Wilmington to London.
