= Action of 24 March 1811 =

Minor naval engagement during the Napoleonic Wars

- Part of the Napoleonic Wars
- Map of Lower Normandy; Location of the destruction of Amazone
Date	24–25 March 1811
Location	near Phare de Gatteville, Normandy 49°41′38.12″N 1°16′39.31″W
Result	British victory

Belligerents
United Kingdom	(France) French Empire

Commanders and leaders
James Macnamara	Bernard-Louis Rosseau

Strength
Ship of the line HMS Berwick, frigates HMS Amelia, HMS Niobe, brig-sloops HMS Goshawk, HMS Hawk	Frigate Amazone

Casualties and losses
Two killed, one wounded	Amazone destroyed

The action of 24 March 1811 was a minor naval engagement of the Napoleonic Wars, fought as part of the Royal Navy blockade of the French English Channel ports. By 1811, Royal Navy control of the French coast was so entrenched that French ships were unable to travel safely even in French territorial waters. In late 1810, French frigates Elisa and Amazone sailed from Le Havre to join with a larger squadron at Cherbourg-en-Cotentin, but were intercepted by a British frigate squadron and forced to shelter at Saint-Vaast-la-Hougue. There they came under sustained attack and Elisa was destroyed, Amazone successfully slipping back to Le Havre under cover of darkness. To prevent Amazone from escaping once more, the British blockade squadron was reinforced.

On the evening of 23 March 1811, Amazone left Le Havre once more, sailing west towards Cherbourg through the night. Escaping the ships watching Le Havre, Amazone was sighted at dawn on 24 March weathering Cape Barfleur by ship of the line HMS Berwick, which pursued the French frigate into a bay 1 nautical mile (1.9 km) west of the Phare de Gatteville lighthouse. There Berwick, reinforced by a squadron of smaller ships, attacked Amazone but was unable to approach through the rocks and shoals of the coast. Plans were made overnight to attack the frigate with ship's boats, but on the following day the French Captain Bernard-Louis Rosseau set his ship on fire to prevent its capture.

== Action ==
By the autumn of 1810 the Napoleonic Wars had lasted for seven years and the French Navy, over the course of the conflict, had been successively driven from the Atlantic until every French port was watched by a Royal Navy close blockade, ready to attack any French ship which emerged from harbour. In 1809, the main French fleet at Brest had attempted to break out into open water, only to be driven back and defeated at the Battle of Basque Roads. Much of the French effort at sea subsequently fell on commerce raiders, including privateers and frigate squadrons, often operating from smaller harbours such as those on the Northern coast of France in the English Channel. The two principal raiding ports were Cherbourg and Le Havre in Normandy, each of which maintained squadrons. In 1810, Cherbourg's anchorage held two ships of the line and a large, newly built frigate Iphigénie, while the frigates Elisa and Amazone were stationed at Le Havre.

Both ports were watched closely by a blockade squadron detached from the Channel Fleet, including ships of the line off Cherbourg and two frigates, HMS Diana and HMS Niobe, off Le Havre. On 12 November 1810 Elisa and Amazone attempted to break out of Le Havre and join with the squadron at Cherbourg, slipping past the blockade in the darkness. Spotted in the early hours of 13 November, the frigates managed to anchor at the well-defended harbour of Saint-Vaast-la-Hougue, where on 15 November they were attacked by the combined blockade forces from Cherbourg and Le Havre. Although the attack was beaten back, Elisa was too badly damaged to continue the mission and on 27 November Amazone successfully returned to Le Havre without encountering the British forces. Elisa was subsequently driven onshore and destroyed by the British squadron.

=== Amazone's journey ===
HMS Amelia, John Christian Schetky, 1852, Norwich Castle

Amazone, commanded by Captain Bernard-Louis Rosseau, attempted to sail to Cherbourg again on 23 March 1811. On this occasion Rosseau successfully evaded the blockade of Le Havre and by dawn on 24 March was weathering the point of Cape Barfleur. As the frigate passed the Phare de Gatteville lighthouse, only a few miles from her destination, she was spotted by a British ship of the line recently sailed from the British fleet anchorage at St Helens, the 74-gun HMS Berwick under Captain James Macnamara, then sailing approximately 12 nautical miles (22 km) offshore. Macnamara took Berwick in pursuit, seeking to cut off Rosseau's advance, and the French captain managed to evade Berwick by taking shelter in a small bay 1 nautical mile (1.9 km) west of the lighthouse.

Navigation through the rocks of the bay had been difficult, and as she entered the bay Amazone's rudder had been torn away, rendering the ship unmanoeuverable. With Amazone trapped, Macnamara called up the rest of the Cherbourg squadron, the frigate HMS Amelia under Captain Frederick Paul Irby and the brig-sloops HMS Goshawk under Commander James Lilburn and HMS Hawk under Commander Henry Bourchier. This force was required to remain a substantial distance offshore as the rocky coastline posed a considerable danger to the British ships. Macnamara's plan was to wait for high tide and then bring the squadron closer inshore to bombard the French frigate into surrender. As they waited, the squadron was joined by Niobe from the Le Havre under Captain John Wentworth Loring. At 16:00 the tides were optimal for the attack and Niobe, Amelia and Berwick sailed into the bay. However, Rosseau had situated Amazone in a strong position, protected from close attack by rocks and shoals and in consequence the British ships could only fire as they wore around, resulting in scattered and inaccurate fire. As they advanced, the British ships came under fire from Amazone, which killed one sailor on Berwick and killed one and wounded another on Amelia, while the British fire had no effect on the French ship. At 18:00, Macnamara withdrew his ships from the bay, all three vessels having suffered considerable damage to their rigging and sails from Amazone's shot.

=== Aftermath ===
Macnamara considered plans to use ship's boats to attack Amazone directly, but resolved to attempt to enter the bay again on the morning of 25 March. As dawn broke however it became apparent that Rosseau had abandoned his damaged ship with his crew, setting the frigate on fire as he departed. By the end of the day Amazone had been burnt to the waterline and destroyed. Macnamara's squadron returned to their blockade duties off Cherbourg. The remaining frigate in the region, Iphigénie, did eventually succeed in breaking out of Cherbourg, but was intercepted and captured in the Atlantic during a raiding mission in January 1814.
