= Charles Grant (Royal Navy officer) =

Royal Navy officer (1770–1824)

Commodore Charles Grant CB
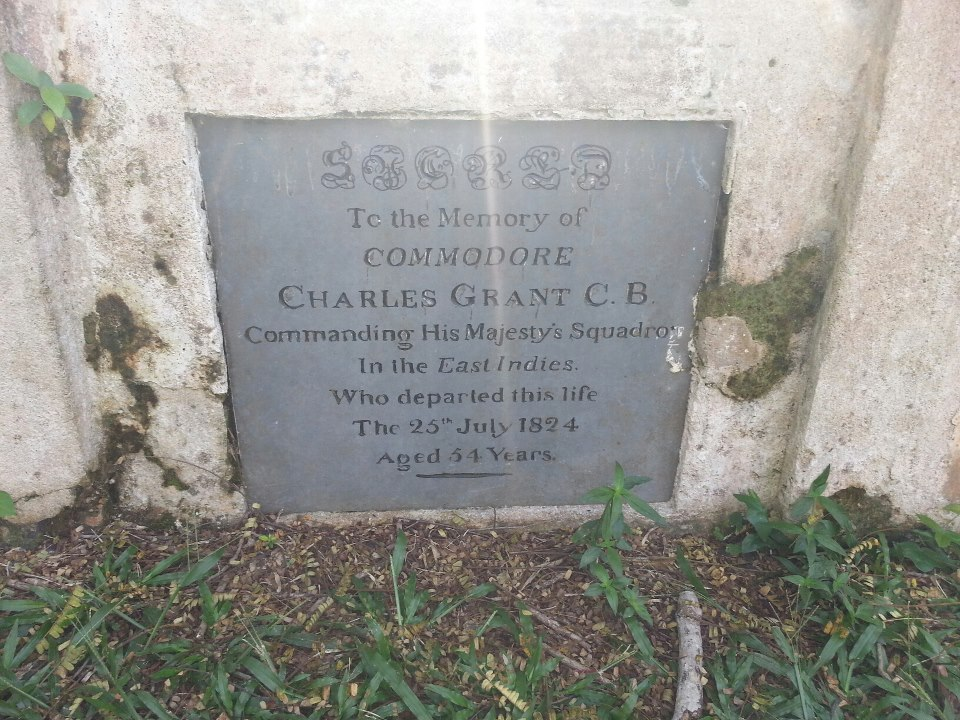
- Grant's tomb in Penang
- Born: 1770
- Died: 25 July 1824 (aged 53–54); Penang
- Military career
- Allegiance: United Kingdom
- Branch: Royal Navy
- Rank: Commodore
- Commands: HMS Abergavenny; HMS Diana; HMS Armada; East Indies Station
- Conflicts: Napoleonic Wars; First Anglo-Burmese War
- Awards: Companion of the Order of the Bath

Commodore Charles Grant CB (1770 – 25 July 1824) was a Royal Navy officer who became Commander-in-Chief of the East Indies Station.

== Naval career ==
Charles Grant was the son of Sir James Grant, 6th Baronet and Anne Colquhoun and lived at Cardonay in Scotland.

His early commands included HMS Abergavenny which he was given in November 1800. By 1810 he had taken charge of HMS Diana. In December 1810 men from the Diana succeeded in boarding and setting fire to the French frigate Elize which had run aground at Tatihou island while attempting to escape from La Hogue during the action of 15 November 1810. Captain Grant declined any assistance, preferring stealth over force. The British succeeded in boarding and setting fire to Elize without suffering any losses despite fire from shore batteries and nearby French brigs.

In January 1812 he was appointed to command HMS Armada. On 23 July 1813, the seas pushed Armada into range of French batteries at Borgidhero. The batteries opened fire but the shots went over Armada. Armada landed her marines who captured the eastern battery and then entered the battery on the point of Borgidhero after the French had tried to blow it up. The marines spiked the guns. The landing party took fire from the nearby town so the frigates accompanying Armada fired on the town while the landing party burnt some vessels on the shore. Armada suffered two men wounded in the engagement. Armada also took part in the action of 5 November 1813 when part of the British Mediterranean Fleet led by Vice-Admiral Sir Edward Pellew, and a French force under Rear-Admiral Julien Cosmao-Kerjulien clashed outside the French port of Toulon. He was appointed CB on 4 June 1815.

He was appointed to the Naval Command at the Cape of Good Hope with the rank of Commodore on 1 September 1821.

Grant was appointed Commander-in-Chief of the East Indies Station in 1822. In that capacity he was appointed commander of a British naval force sent on an expedition to Burma in Spring 1824 to counter Burmese aggression against the East India Company. The force included HMS Larne and HMS Sophie. On 11 May 1824 Larne proceeded up the Irrawaddy and having silenced a gun battery, landed the troops who occupied Rangoon before proceeding further up river and then falling ill with cholera and other diseases. Grant fell mortally ill and departed for Penang but died there two months later.

Military offices
Preceded by Henry Blackwood	Commander-in-Chief, East Indies Station; 1822–1824	Succeeded by James Brisbane
