= Action of 15 November 1810 =

Minor naval engagement during the French Revolutionary Wars

Coordinates: 49°35′20″N 1°15′30″W

- Part of the Napoleonic Wars
- Map of Lower Normandy; Location of the destruction of Elisa
Date	12–16 November 1810
Location	Baie de la Seine, English Channel
Result	British victory

Belligerents
United Kingdom	(France) French Empire

Commanders and leaders
Pulteney Malcolm	Bernard-Louis Rosseau; Louis-Henri Fraycinet-Saulce

Strength
Ships of the line HMS Donegal, HMS Revenge frigate HMS Diana, HMS Niobe	frigates Elisa and Amazone

Casualties and losses
Two killed, nine wounded	1 killed, Elisa later destroyed

The action of 15 November 1810 was a minor naval engagement fought during the British Royal Navy blockade of the French Channel ports in the Napoleonic Wars. British dominance at sea, enforced by a strategy of close blockade, made it difficult for the French Navy to operate even in their own territorial waters. In the autumn of 1810, a British squadron assigned to patrol the Baie de la Seine was effectively isolating two French squadrons in the ports of Le Havre and Cherbourg-en-Cotentin. On 12 November, the squadron in Le Havre, consisting of frigates Elisa and Amazone attempted to reach Cherbourg at night in order to united the squadrons. This squadron was spotted in the early hours of 13 November by the patrolling British frigates HMS Diana and HMS Niobe, which gave chase.

The French ships took shelter at the heavily fortified Iles Saint-Marcouf, sailing the following morning for the anchorage at Saint-Vaast-la-Hougue. For two days the British frigates kept watch, until two ships of the line from the blockade of Cherbourg, HMS Donegal and HMS Revenge, arrived. On 15 November, the British squadron attacked the anchored French ships, which were defended by shore batteries at La Hougue and Tatihou. After four attempts to close with the French the British squadron, under heavy fire, withdrew. During the night, the British commander, Captain Pulteney Malcolm, sent his ship's boats close inshore to attack the French ships with Congreve rockets, a newly issued weapon. None are recorded as landing on target, but by morning both frigates had been forced to change position, becoming grounded on the shore. The French ships were later refloated, and Malcolm's squadron maintained the blockade until 27 November when Amazone successfully escaped back to Le Havre. The damaged Elisa remained at anchor until 6 December, when an attack by a British bomb vessel forced the frigate to move further inshore, becoming grounded once more. Elisa remained in this position until 23 December, when the boats of Diana entered the anchorage at night and set the beached ship on fire, destroying her.

== Baie de la Seine in 1810 ==
By 1810 the French Navy fleet based in the Atlantic ports had been prevented from launching any major operations for four years, penned into harbour by the British strategy of close blockade. A failed attempt by a French fleet to sail had been defeated at the Battle of Basque Roads in 1809, and the main operations still carried out by the Navy were undertaken by privateers and frigate squadrons operating commerce raiders operating from smaller ports, such as those on the English Channel. In November 1810 squadrons were based at Cherbourg, with two ships of the line and the newly built frigate Iphigénie, and Le Havre, with the frigates Elisa and Amazone, commanded by Captains Louis-Henri Fraycinet-Saulce and Bernard-Louis Rosseau respectively. To blockade these squadrons, the Royal Navy's Channel Fleet had assigned the ships of the line HMS Donegal under Captain Pulteney Malcolm and HMS Revenge under Captain Charles Paget to patrol the entrance to Cherbourg, while frigates HMS Diana under Captain Charles Grant and HMS Niobe under Captain John Wentworth Loring kept watch on Le Havre. The blockade had achieved some minor successes; in October 1810 Revenge had captured the privateer Vengeur from Dieppe, and on 6 November Donegal ran down and seized the privateer Surcouf from Cherbourg.

=== Pursuit of Amazone and Elisa ===
At 22:00 on 12 November Amazone and Elisa sailed from Le Havre to unite with the force at Cherbourg, hoping to evade the blockade in the darkness. They successfully passed the patrolling Diana and Niobe but were spotted sailing northwest at 00:30 by the British ships which gave chase, Niobe turning inshore in an attempt to cut off the French line of advance. With the wind in the northeast, the French frigates were unable to pass Cape Barfleur under pursuit, and Rosseau instead turned his squadron towards the Iles Saint-Marcouf at 04:00, using superior local knowledge to bypass the pursuing British ships. The heavily fortified islands had been under British control during the French Revolutionary Wars, but reverted to the French at the Peace of Amiens in 1802. Diana and Niobe attempted to intercept the French frigates before they came under the shelter of the guns, but were only able to fire two long-distance broadsides at the trailing Elisa.

At 11:00, Rosseau gave orders for the French frigates to sail once more, slipping away from the British ships which had drifted to the north and anchoring safely between the batteries at Saint-Vaast-la-Hougue and the island of Tatihou. Observing the strong position the French frigates had taken up, Grant sent messages to Malcolm's force at Cherbourg requesting reinforcements. Malcolm brought Donegal and Revenge to support the frigates on 14 November, maintaining position off the anchorage despite a strong gale which caused Elisa to drag her anchors. Captain Fraycinet-Saulce was forced to throw much of the ship's stores overboard to prevent his frigate from being wrecked on the shore. The following day, Diana took advantage of the rising tide to attack the anchored Amazone, Captain Rosseau withdrawing deeper into the sheltered anchorage under protection from the batteries. Twice more Grant launched probing attacks on the French frigate, each time beaten off by heavy fire from the batteries. Joined by Malcolm and the remainder of the British force, four successive attacks were launched against Amazone, each one driven back by cannon fire. At 13:00, with the tide falling, the British squadron was compelled to retreat to deeper water, out of range of the French. All four British ships had suffered under fire, with two killed and five wounded on Revenge, three wounded on Donegal and one wounded on Diana. French losses were a single man killed on Amazone.

On the evening of 15 November Malcolm ordered the ship's boats of the squadron to approach the anchorage under cover of darkness, commanded by Lieutenant Joseph Needham Taylor. The boats had been equipped with Congreve rockets, a recently invented artillery system which was not then widely in use by the Royal Navy. None of the rockets fired during the night appeared to have hit their targets, but they seem to have panicked the French crews; dawn the following morning revealed that both frigates had cut their anchors and drifted onto the shore, Elisa in particular had struck hard and heeled over onto her side. Both ships were however successfully refloated by the rising tide on 16 November, and the situation reached an impasse, with Malcolm's forces blockading Saint-Vaast-la-Hougue to prevent the French from sailing.

=== Destruction of Elisa ===
For nearly two weeks the French frigates remained at anchor, Malcolm and Grant drawing up plans for an attack with fireships, when Amazone successfully slipped out of harbour on 27 November, returning successfully to Le Havre before dawn the following day. With Amazone gone, Grant maintained a closer watch on Elisa, calling up a bomb vessel to attack the anchorage on 6 December. This proved no more accurate than the rockets, but Elisa was again driven into shallow waters to avoid the attack, this time becoming irretrievably grounded on a shoal. Over the next two weeks Elisa remained grounded, the frigate gradually being reduced to the state of a total wreck. On 23 December Grant sent his boats, commanded by Lieutenant Thomas Rowe, into the anchorage under cover of darkness and set the wreck on fire to ensure that the frigate's stores could not be salvaged.

With the destruction of Elisa, the British squadrons returned to their blockade duties off Cherbourg and Le Havre. The blockade remained in place throughout the remainder of the Napoleonic Wars; Rosseau in Amazone made another attempt to join the squadron in Cherbourg in March 1811, only to be run down and destroyed by a squadron led by the ship of the line HMS Berwick. The new Iphigénie survived a little longer, being intercepted and captured in the Atlantic during a raiding mission in January 1814.
