= French frigate Diane (1796) =

Warship

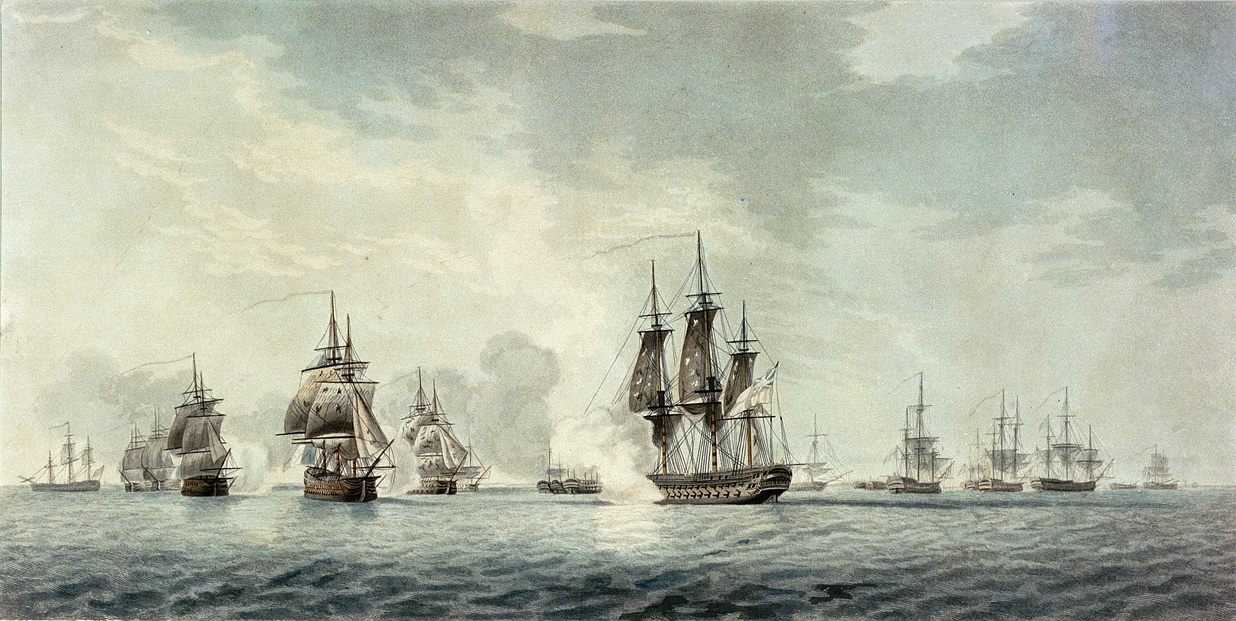
- Diane (third from left) at the Battle of the Nile

History

France
- Name: Diane
- Namesake: Diana
- Builder: Toulon
- Laid down: July 1794
- Launched: 10 February 1796
- In service: March 1796
- Captured: 27 August 1800

Great Britain
- Name: HMS Niobe
- Namesake: Niobe
- Acquired: 27 August 1800 by capture
- Fate: Broken up in 1816

General characteristics
- Displacement: 1466 tonneaux
- Tons burthen: 750 port tonneaux; 1,14215/94 (bm)
- Length: 47.6 m (156 ft)
- Beam: 12 m (39 ft)
- Draught: 5.7 m (19 ft)
- Propulsion: Sail
- Armament: 38 to 44 guns

Diane was a 38-gun frigate of the French Navy, launched in 1796. She participated in the battle of the Nile, but in August 1800 the Royal Navy captured her. She was taken into British service as HMS Niobe, and broken up in 1816.

== French career ==
She took part in the Battle of the Nile, managing to escape to Malta with Justice. During the battle Rear-Admiral Denis Decrès was on board Diane in his capacity as commander of the frigate squadron. He would go on to become Napoleon's Minister of Marine.

In 1800, as she tried to escape from Malta, HMS Success, HMS Northumberland, and HMS Genereux captured her. At the time she had only 114 men on board, having left the remainder at Malta to assist in its defense.

== British career ==
The Royal Navy commissioned her as HMS Niobe, under the command of Captain John Wentworth Loring, there already being an HMS Diana in service.

On 28 March 1806, Niobe was off Groix when she captured the 16-gun Néarque, which had just separated from Leduc's division.

Niobe, still under Captain Loring, and Argus, Commander James Stuart, captured the Danish ship King of Assianthe on 31 August 1807.

On 13 November 1810, off Le Havre along with Diana, Niobe sighted the 40-gun Amazone and the 44-gun Elisa. HMS Donegal and Revenge joined the chase, attacking the French squadron when it was anchored at Saint-Vaast-la-Hougue at the action of 15 November 1810. Eventually, Elisa was wrecked near La Hougue, while Amazone escaped to Le Havre. Four months later at the action of 24 March 1811, Niobe participated in the destruction of the French frigate Amazone near the Phare de Gatteville lighthouse, Normandy.

On 24 March 1811, she sailed with a squadron comprising HMS Berwick, Amelia, Goshawk, and Hawk, again chased Amazone, which they trapped near Barfleur. Amazone's crew scuttled her to prevent her capture.

On 3 July 1813, she sailed from Quebec with a convoy, arriving in England in August 1813. On 18 September 1814 she embarked troops at Plymouth and sailed for America. On 22 December 1814 she departed Spithead for Halifax, and arrived at Halifax on 29 January 1815, carrying officers and men for the campaign in North America.

The Niobe, along with the Dasher, Fairy, Espiegle, Columbia, Barbadoes, Muros, Chanticleer, and Fox were utilised as troop ships during the Invasion of Guadeloupe (1815) against the Bonapartist Admiral Linois. She arrived at Bermuda on 3 January 1816, and departed on 19 January 1816. She arrived in Portsmouth on 10 February 1816.

== Fate ==
HMS Niobe was eventually sold on 31 July 1816.
