= HMS Revenge (1805) =

Ship of the line of the Royal Navy

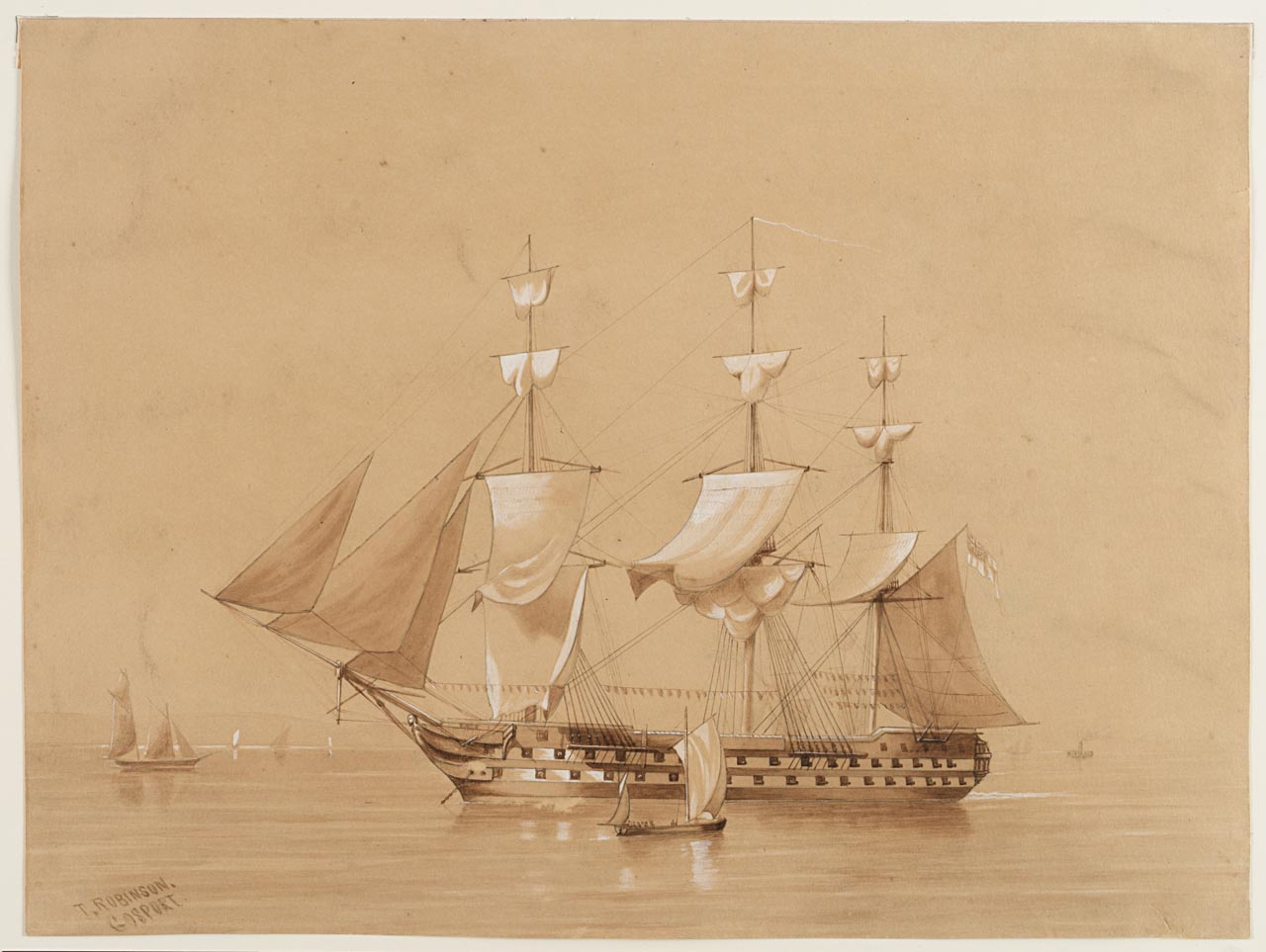
- HMS Revenge at Gosport

History

United Kingdom
- Name: HMS Revenge
- Ordered: 29 September 1796
- Builder: Chatham Dockyard
- Laid down: August 1800
- Launched: 13 April 1805
- Honours and awards: Participated in: Battle of Trafalgar
- Fate: Broken up, 1849

General characteristics
- Class & type: 74-gun third-rate ship of the line
- Tons burthen: 1954 (bm)
- Length: 181 ft 11 in (55.4 m) (gundeck)
- Beam: 49 ft 2 in (15.0 m)
- Depth of hold: 20 ft 9 in (6.3 m)
- Propulsion: Sails
- Sail plan: Full-rigged ship
- Armament: Gundeck: 28 × 32-pounder guns; Upper gundeck: 30 × 24-pounder guns; QD: 12 × 9-pounder guns; Fc: 4 × 9-pounder guns

HMS Revenge was a 74-gun third-rate ship of the line of the Royal Navy, launched on 13 April 1805. Sir John Henslow designed her as one of the large class 74s; she was the only ship built to her draught. As a large 74, she carried 24-pounder guns on her upper gun deck, rather than the 18-pounder guns found on the middling and common class 74s.

== Career ==
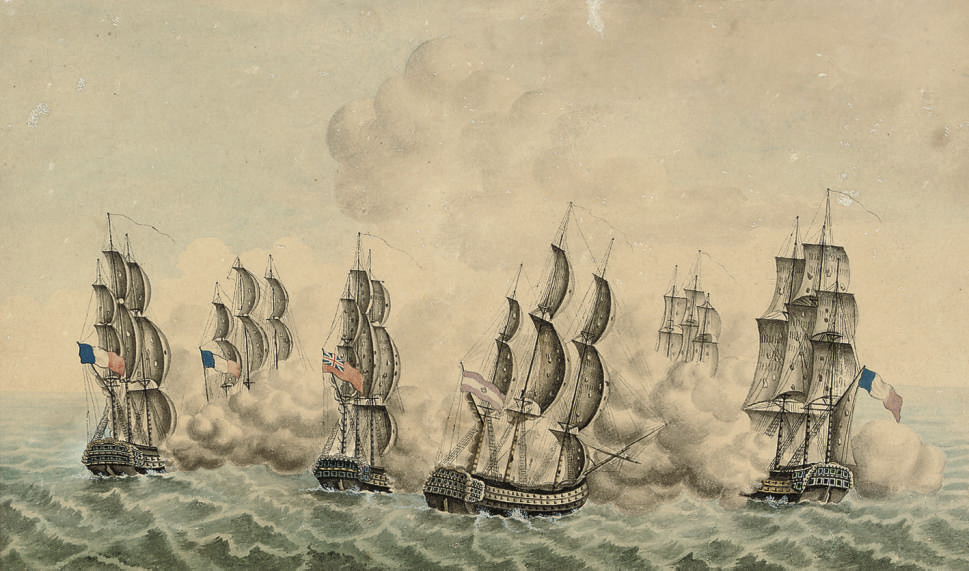
Revenge in the action off Cape Trafalgar in 1805, a watercolour by her Lieut. Lewis Hole RN (Admiral Lewis Hole (1779–1870))

Newly commissioned, and captained by Robert Moorsom, she fought at the Battle of Trafalgar, where she sailed in Collingwood's column. Revenge was engaged at the Battle of Basque Roads in April 1809 under Captain Alexander Robert Kerr.

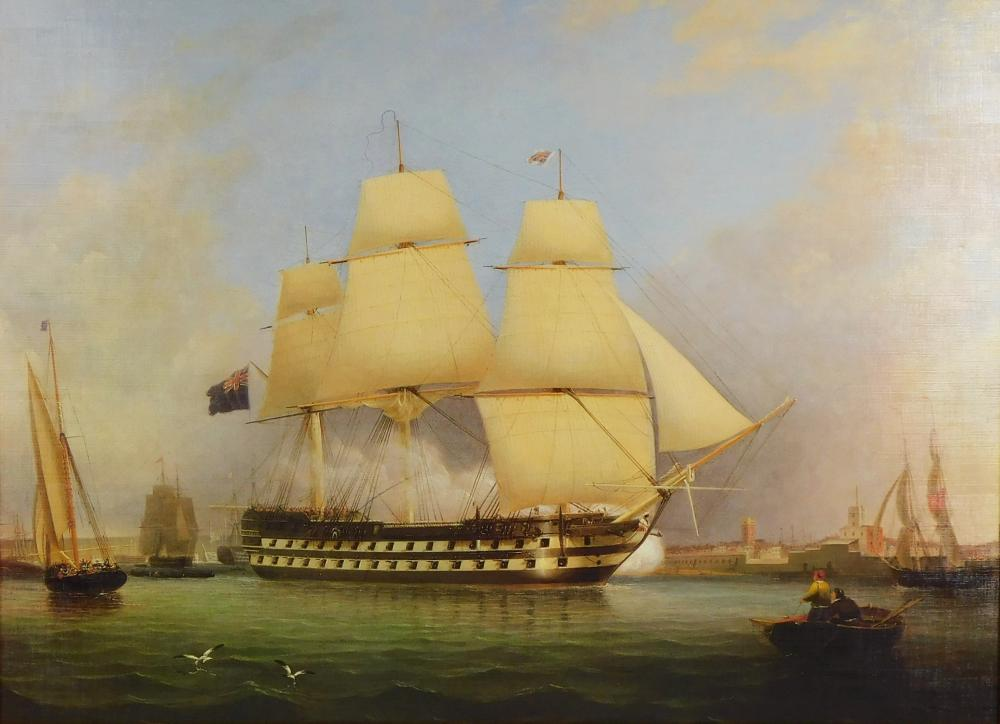
Revenge, in a Mediterranean harbour in 1808, by R. S. Thomas R.N.

In October 1810, Revenge captured the French privateer cutter Vauteur off Cherbourg after a five-hour chase. Vauteur had been armed with 16 guns, but she threw 14 of them overboard during the chase. She had been out of Dieppe for 45 hours but had made no captures. She was the former British cutter John Bull, of Plymouth, and was restored to Plymouth on 19 October. The report in Lloyd's List announcing this news appears to have confused names. Vauteur appears to have been Vengeur. There is no account of Revenge capturing a Vauteur, but on 17 October, Revenge captured the French privateer lugger Vengeur, off Cherbourg. The lugger crossed to windward of Revenge before daylight, and Revenge gave chase, finally capturing her quarry after three hours. Vengeur was armed with 16 guns and had a crew of 78 men. She was one day out of Dieppe and had not taken any prizes.

On 6 November, Donegal captured the privateer Surcouf. Revenge, Donegal, and the hired armed lugger Sandwich would share in the prize money for Vengeur and Surcouf.

On 13 November 1810, the frigates Diana and Niobe attacked two French frigates (Elisa and Amazone), which sought protection under the shore batteries near Saint-Vaast-la-Hougue. Revenge and Donegal arrived two days later and together the four ships fired upon the French for as long as the tide would allow. The operation cost Donegal three men wounded. Élisa was driven ashore and ultimately destroyed as a result of this action; Amazone escaped safely into Le Havre.

She took part in the 1840 Syria operations as part of the Mediterranean fleet, under Capt. Waldegrave and was present in the attack on Acre.

== Fate ==
Revenge served until 1842, being broken up in 1849. She was one of the first warships of the Royal Navy to be painted with the Nelson Checker.

Plan showing the ballast and ground tier, and the middle and upper tier of the hold for Revenge. The plan illustrates the way the method of stowage compensated for the imbalance in the ship's trim and balance between 1823 and 1827

Plan showing the sail layout with alterations for Revenge
