= HMS Donegal (1798) =

Ship of the line of the Royal Navy

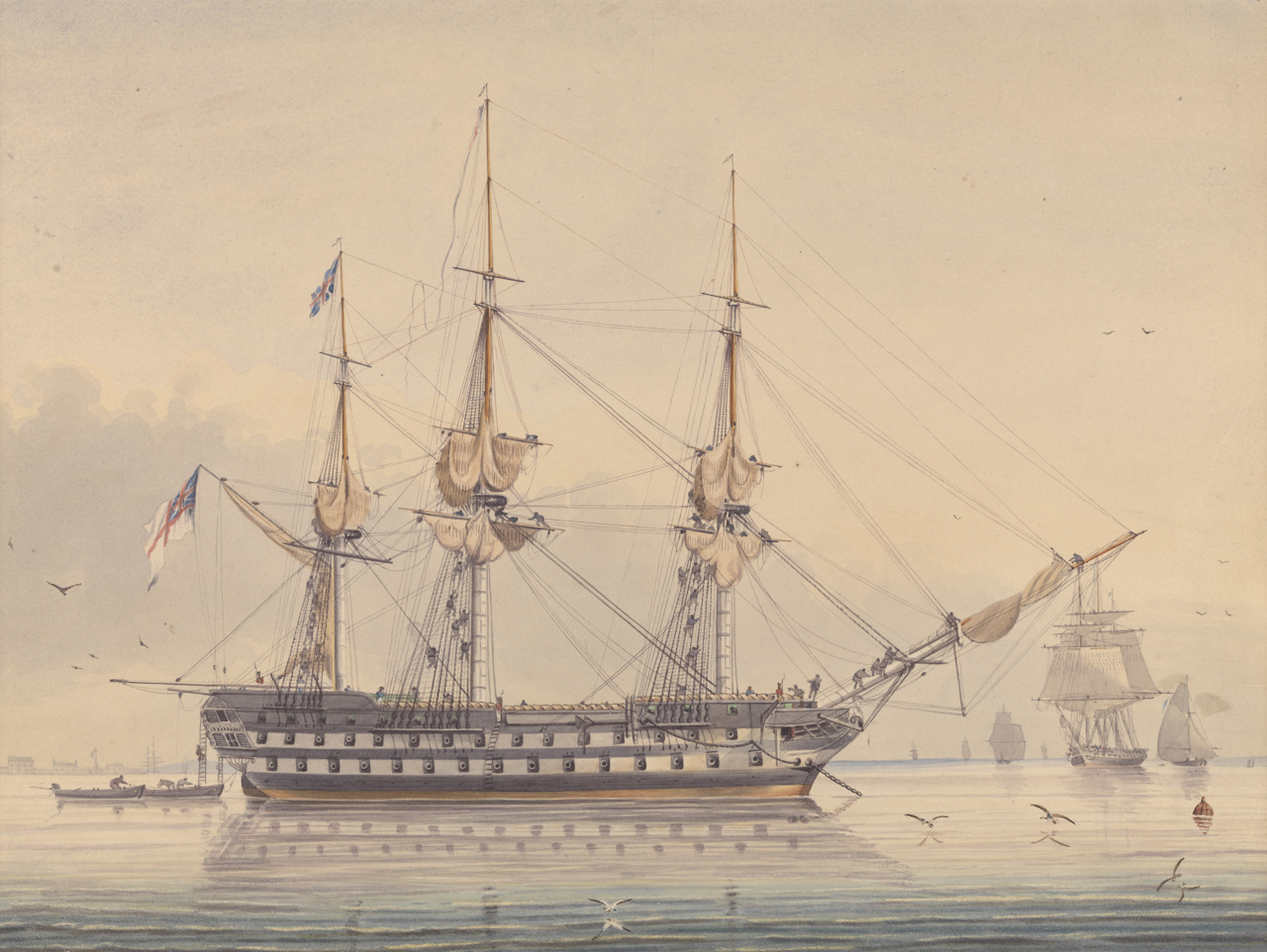
- 1840 painting of Donegal

History

France
- Name: Barra
- Namesake: Joseph Barra; Pegasus; Lazare Hoche
- Builder: Toulon
- Laid down: November 1791
- Launched: 23 March 1794
- Commissioned: February 1795
- Renamed: Pégase (October 1795), then; Hoche (December 1797)
- Captured: by the British, 12 October 1798
- Fate: Captured by the British 12 October 1798

Great Britain
- Name: HMS Donegal
- Namesake: County Donegal
- Acquired: Captured from the French on 12 October 1798
- Fate: Broken up in May 1845

General characteristics
- Class & type: Téméraire-class ship of the line
- Displacement: 3,069 tonneaux
- Tons burthen: 1,537 port tonneaux
- Length: 55.87 metres (183.3 ft) (172 pieds)
- Beam: 14.46 metres (47 ft 5 in) (44½ pieds)
- Draught: 7.26 metres (23.8 ft) (22 pieds)
- Propulsion: Up to 2,485 m^{2} (26,750 sq ft) of sails
- Armament: 74 guns: Lower gundeck: 28 × 36-pounder long guns; Upper gundeck: 30 × 18-pounder long guns; Forecastle and Quarter deck: 16 × 8-pounder long guns; 4 × 36-pdr carronades
- Armour: Timber

HMS Donegal was launched in 1794 as Barra, a 74-gun Téméraire-class ship of the line built for the French Navy during the 1790s. She was renamed Pégase in October 1795, and Hoche in December 1797. The British Royal Navy captured her at the Battle of Tory Island on 12 October 1798 and recommissioned her as HMS Donegal.

== Capture ==
Hoche took part in the French attempt to land in County Donegal, in the west of Ulster, to support the Irish Rebellion of 1798. She formed the flagship of an expedition under Commodore Jean-Baptiste-François Bompart, consisting of Hoche and eight frigates, and transporting 3,000 French troops. Aboard Hoche was Wolfe Tone, the leading figure in the Society of United Irishmen. The ships were chased by a number of British frigates after they had left the port of Brest on 16 September. Despite throwing them off, they were then pursued by a fleet of larger ships under the command of Commodore Sir John Borlase Warren. Both sides were hampered by the heavy winds and gales they encountered off the west coast of Ireland, and Hoche lost all three of her topmasts and had her mizzensail shredded, causing her to fall behind. The French were finally brought to battle off Tory Island on 12 October 1798.

The battle started at 07:00 in the morning, with Warren giving the signal for HMS Robust to steer for the French line and attack Hoche directly. Hoche then came under fire from HMS Magnanime. The next three British ships into action, the frigates Ethalion, Melampus and Amelia, all raked the isolated Hoche as they passed before pressing on sail to pursue the French frigates, now sailing towards to the south-west. With Hoche heavily damaged, Bompart finally surrendered at 10:50 with 270 of his crew and passengers killed or wounded, giving his sword to Lieutenant Sir Charles Dashwood. Wolfe Tone was later recognised and arrested.

== In Royal Navy service ==
=== Off Cádiz ===
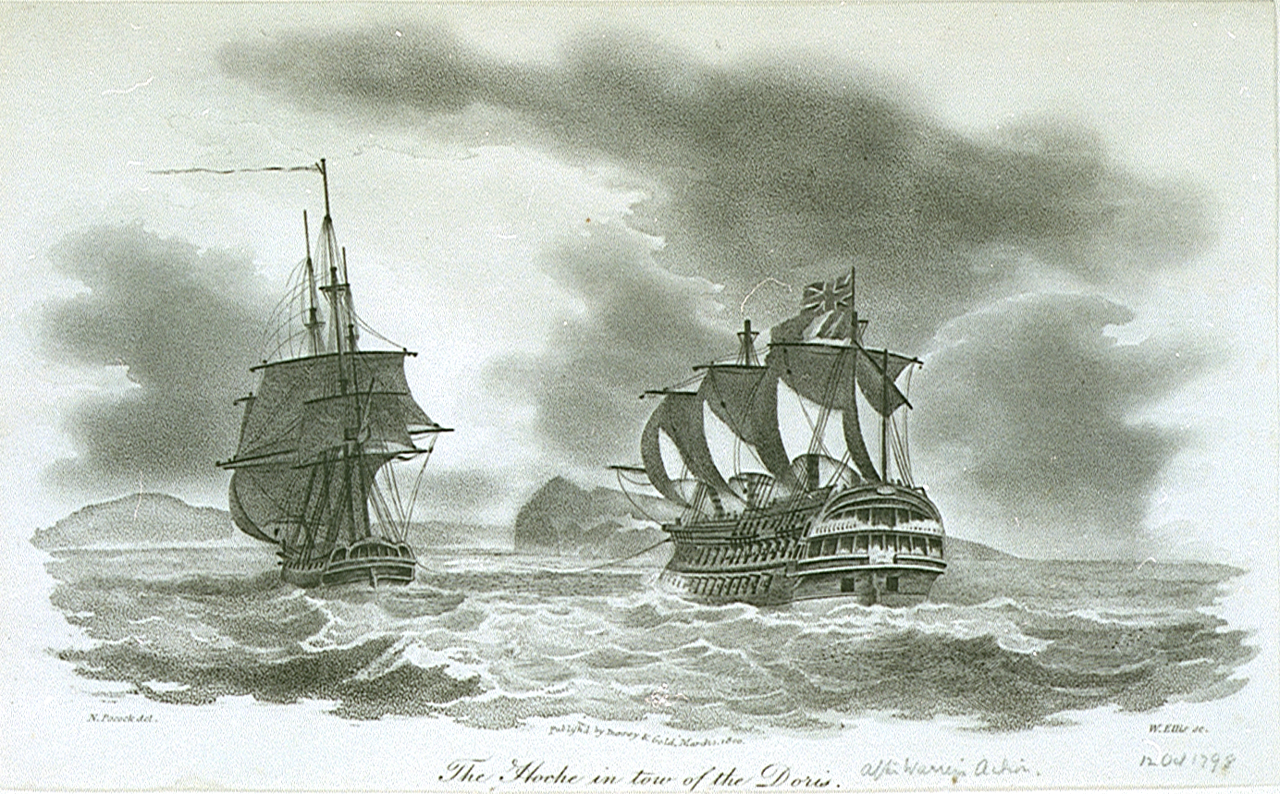
The Hoche in tow of the Doris

The captured Hoche was towed by the Doris to Lough Swilly, County Donegal, Ireland; taken into service and renamed HMS Donegal, after the action in which she had been captured. She spent 1800 in Plymouth, and in 1801 came under the command of Captain Sir Richard Strachan, with William Bissell as her first lieutenant from 1801 until December 1805. Donegal was initially deployed in the English Channel, but following the outbreak of hostilities with Spain, she was assigned to watch the French squadron at Cádiz. Whilst on this station, she spotted and gave chase to the large 42-gun Spanish frigate Amfitrite in November 1804. After pursuing her for 46 hours, Amfitrite lost her mizzen-top-mast and Donegal subsequently overhauled her.

The engagement lasted only eight minutes, Amfitrite surrendered and after being searched, was found to be laden with stores and carrying dispatches from Cádiz to Tenerife and Havana. She was taken over and later commissioned into the Navy as HMS Amfitrite. Donegal would later make another capture off Cádiz, taking a Spanish vessel carrying a cargo reputed to be worth 200,000 pounds.

=== In the Mediterranean and Atlantic ===
By 1805 Donegal was still off Cádiz, under the command of Captain Pulteney Malcolm. She then accompanied Vice-admiral Nelson in his pursuit of the combined fleets across the Atlantic to the West Indies and back. She was not present at Trafalgar, but was able, on 23 October, to capture the partially dismasted Spanish first rate Rayo which had escaped Trafalgar, but had been ordered to sea again to attempt to recapture some of the British prizes.

'Duckworth's Action off San Domingo, on 6 February 1806' by Nicholas Pocock. HMS Donegal is on the left of the painting, engaging the Jupiter

Donegal was then part of a squadron off Cádiz under Vice-admiral John Duckworth, when news reached him that two French squadrons had sailed from Brest in December 1805. Duckworth took his squadron to Barbados to search for them, eventually sighting them off San Domingo on 6 February 1806. Duckworth organised his ships into two lines, the weather line consisting of HMS Superb, Northumberland and Spencer, while the lee line consisted of Agamemnon, Canopus, Donegal and Atlas. The lines moved to attack the French ships and the Battle of San Domingo broke out. Donegal initially engaged the Brave with several broadsides, forcing her to surrender after half an hour. Captain Malcolm then moved his position to fire a few broadsides into the Jupiter before sending a boarding party aboard her. The crew of Jupiter then surrendered her. Captain Malcolm then directed the frigate HMS Acasta to take possession of Brave. After the battle, Donegal had lost her fore-yard and had 12 killed and 33 wounded.

=== Off the French coast ===
She remained under the command of Pulteney Malcolm, and was stationed off Finisterre throughout 1807. She then became the flagship of Rear-admiral Eliab Harvey, and was later placed under the command of Rear-admiral Richard Keats in the Channel. Donegal was at Spithead in 1808 and over a period of five days from 1 August Captain Malcolm oversaw the disembarkation of Sir Arthur Wellesley's army at Mondego Bay. Donegal’s first-lieutenant James Askey acted as the beach-master during the landings.

On 23 February 1809 Donegal was part of a squadron under Rear-Admiral Stopford, when they chased three enemy frigates into the Sable d'Olonne, leading to the Battle of Les Sables-d'Olonne. HMS Defiance was able to anchor within half a mile of them, whilst Donegal and Caesar had to anchor further out because of their deeper draughts. Their combined fire eventually forced two of the frigates to run ashore, whilst Donegal suffered one man killed and six wounded in the engagement. By April 1809 Donegal was sailing with Admiral James Gambier's fleet in the Basque Roads. During the Battle of the Basque Roads, Donegal's first-lieutenant James Askey commanded the fire ship Hercule in the attack on the French fleet, with the assistance of midshipman Charles Falkiner, also of Donegal.

Donegal was commanded by acting-Captain Edward Pelham Brenton when she sailed for Cádiz on 24 July 1809, carrying the ambassador to the Junta at Seville, Marquess Richard Wellesley, brother of Sir Arthur Wellesley. She arrived on 1 August, shortly after the Battle of Talavera, and after the failure of Richard Wellesley's mission, returned him to Britain in November. On her arrival, Captain Malcolm resumed command of Donegal.

On 6 November 1810, Donegal captured the French privateer lugger Surcouf off Cape Barfleur. Surcouf, of 14 guns and 53 men, was one day out of Cherbourg and had made no captures. The hired armed lugger Sandwich shared in the prize money arising from the capture, as well as Revenge's capture on 17 October of the privateer Vengeur. Donegal too shared in the proceeds of the capture of Vengeur, suggesting Donegal, Revenge, and Sandwich were all in company.

On 13 November 1810, the frigates Diana and Niobe attacked two French frigates (Elisa and Amazone), which sought protection under the shore batteries near Saint-Vaast-la-Hougue. Revenge and Donegal arrived two days later and together the four ships fired upon the French for as long as the tide would allow. The operation cost Donegal three men wounded. Élisa was driven ashore and ultimately destroyed as a result of this action; Amazone escaped safely into Le Havre.

== Fate ==
Donegal spent most of 1811 off Cherbourg, before being reduced to ordinary at Portsmouth later that year. She was later moved and spent 1814 in ordinary at Chatham. After the end of the Napoleonic era, she was refitted and brought back into service as a flagship, serving well into the 1830s; Donegal was eventually broken up in 1845.
