= USS LST-1031 =

US Navy landing ship

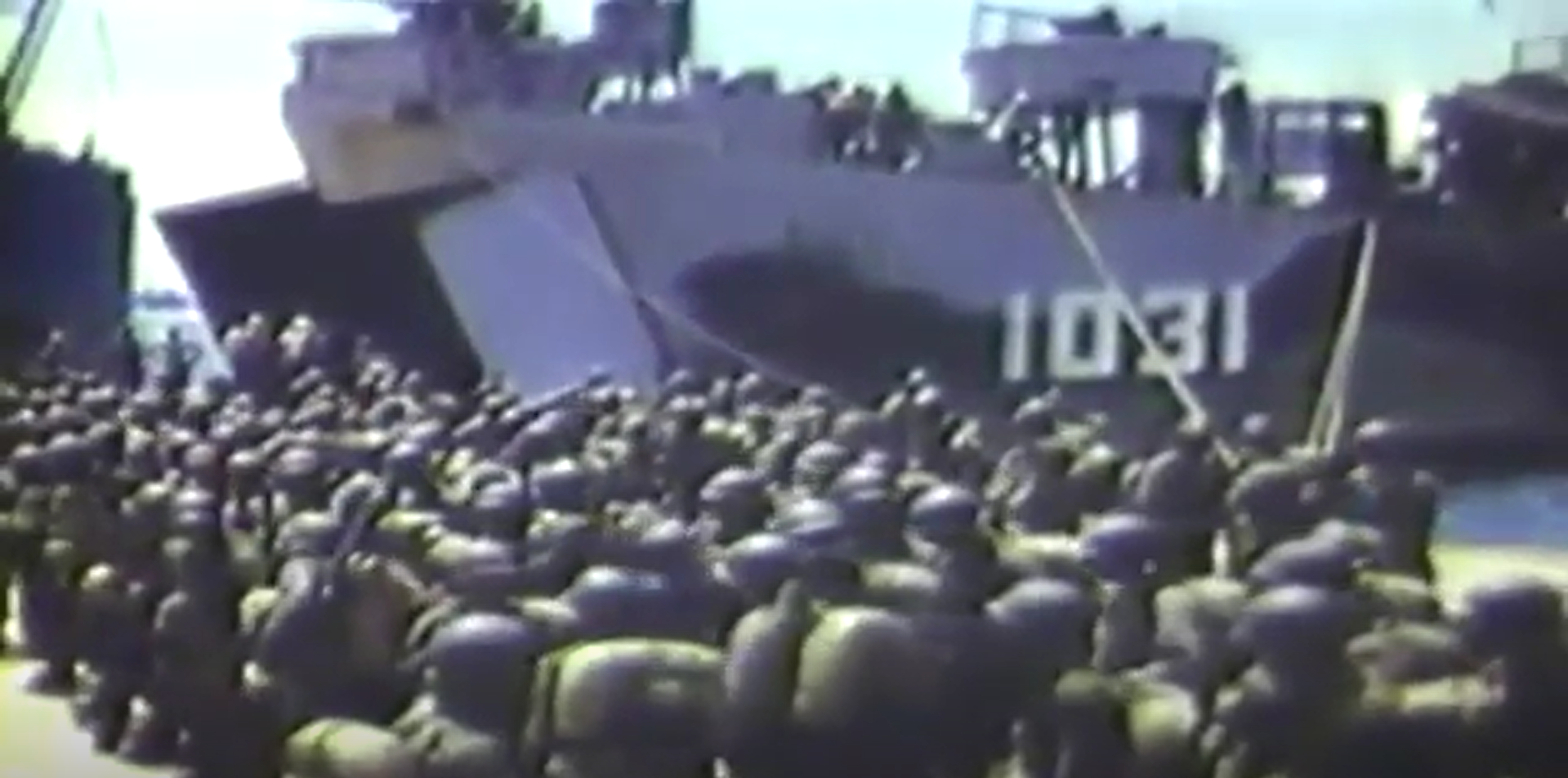
- Marines board USS LST-1031 in preparation for the Invasion of Okinawa

History

United States
- Name: LST-1031
- Builder: Boston Navy Yard, Boston
- Laid down: 27 May 1944
- Launched: 25 June 1944
- Commissioned: 25 July 1944
- Decommissioned: 18 December 1945
- Fate: Sold, 23 October 1947

General characteristics
- Class & type: LST-542-class tank landing ship
- Displacement: 1,623 short tons (1,472 t) (light); 3,800 short tons (3,400 t) (full load)
- Length: 327 ft 9 in (99.90 m)
- Beam: 50 ft 1.5 in (15.278 m)
- Installed power: 1,800 hp (1,300 kW)
- Propulsion: 2 × diesel engines; 2 × propellers
- Range: 23,000 nmi (43,000 km; 26,000 mi) at 8.75 knots (16.21 km/h; 10.07 mph)
- Complement: 7 officers, 104 enlisted
- Armament: Intended: 2 × twin 40 mm (1.6 in) guns; 4 × single 40 mm (1.6 in) guns; 12 × single 20 mm (0.79 in) guns

USS LST-1031 was a LST-542-class Landing Ship Tank of the United States Navy. Built in 1944, she operated in the Pacific Theater during World War II. The ship was damaged during a training accident and missed the invasion of Iwo Jima, although she later participated in the invasion of Okinawa several months later. The landing ship was decommissioned in 1945 and scrapped two years later.

== Development and design ==
Before the 1930s, amphibious assaults typically relied on ships' boats to ferry troops and equipment ashore, often with little enemy resistance. However, the introduction of mechanized armies required specialized vessels that could cross oceans to deliver large, heavy, vehicles–such as tanks–directly onto a beachhead. The British developed the first Landing Ship Tanks (LSTs) in 1941. These vessels featured a shallow draft and a bow-mounted ramp that allowed vehicles to drive directly onto land. An anchor at the stern enabled the ship to pull herself free after intentionally beaching on shore. By early 1942, the United States began constructing LSTs based on the same principles. In late 1943, the LST-542 class was a refined version of the second generation LST(2) design, which incorporated war-time experience including a weather deck capable of carrying heavy cargo, more anti-air defenses, and a greater displacement.

The LST-542 class featured a length of 327 feet 9 inches (99.90 m) and beam of 50 feet 1.5 inches (15.278 m). While at sea, the fully loaded draft ranged from 7 feet 1 inch (2.16 m) in the bow and 13 feet 6 inches (4.11 m) in the aft to 3 feet 1 inch (0.94 m) and 9 feet 6 inches (2.90 m) when beached. The vessels featured a light displacement of 1,623 short tons (1,472 t), loaded displacement of 3,800 short tons (3,400 t), and a deadweight (cargo) capacity of 1,900 short tons (1,700 t), which was capable of carrying up to 20 M4 Sherman tanks or 70 trucks across the tank and weather decks. They were propelled by two V12 900 horsepower (670 kW) General Motors 12-567 diesel engines that provided an economic cruising speed of 8.75 knots (16.21 km/h; 10.07 mph) for a range of 23,000 nautical miles (43,000 km; 26,000 mi) through two propellers. Armament on LSTs varied widely between ships due to differences in shipyards, wartime modifications, supply shortages, and weapons provided by embarked troops. The ideal anti-air suite consisted of two twin 40-millimeter (1.6 in), four single 40 mm (1.6 in), and twelve single 20 mm (0.79 in) guns. Crew requirements also differed, with LSTs that retained davits to carry two Higgins boats were operated by seven officers and 104 enlisted sailors.

== Service history ==
USS LST-1031 was laid down on 27 May 1944 at the Boston Navy Yard, launched on 25 June 1944, and commissioned on 25 July 1944. In January 1945, LST-1031 participated in a rehearsal off Hawaii in preparation for the invasion of Iwo Jima. The LST was involved in the most severe accident during the drill, and was heavily damaged and beached. As a result, LST-1031 was detached from the invasion force, replaced by another vessel, and repaired in Hawaii. By May, the ship participated in the invasion and occupation of Okinawa for several months. She later returned to the United States; on 18 December 1945, the landing ship was decommissioned and was sold off for scrapping on 23 October 1947.
