= HMS Berwick (1809) =

Vengeur-class ship of the line

- Berwick

History

United Kingdom
- Name: Berwick
- Ordered: 1 July 1807
- Builder: Perry, Wells & Green, Blackwall Yard
- Laid down: October 1807
- Launched: 11 September 1809
- Commissioned: March 1810
- Decommissioned: July 1816
- Fate: Broken up, March 1821

General characteristics (as built)
- Class & type: Vengeur-class ship of the line
- Tons burthen: 1,757 (bm)
- Length: 176 ft (53.6 m) (gundeck)
- Beam: 47 ft 9 in (14.6 m)
- Draught: 18 ft (5.5 m) (light)
- Depth of hold: 21 ft (6.4 m)
- Sail plan: Full-rigged ship
- Complement: 590
- Armament: 74 muzzle-loading, smoothbore guns; Gundeck: 28 × 32 pdr guns; Upper deck: 28 × 18 pdr guns; Quarterdeck: 4 × 12 pdr guns + 10 × 32 pdr carronades; Forecastle: 2 × 12 pdr guns + 2 × 32 pdr carronades

HMS Berwick was a 74-gun third rate Vengeur-class ship of the line built for the Royal Navy in the first decade of the 19th century. Completed in 1810, she played a minor role in the Napoleonic Wars.

launched on 11 September 1809 at Blackwall.

== Career ==
At the action of 24 March 1811, Berwick under Captain James Macnamara led the pursuit and destruction of the French frigate Amazone near the Phare de Gatteville lighthouse, Normandy. One sailor was killed in the engagement.

Before the fall of Genoa in April 1814, the boats of Berwick and Rainbow, together with two Sicilian gunboats, attacked French posts near the pass of Rona on 8 and 10 April to assist the British army in its advance. The British drove off the French defenders, who left behind two 24-pounder guns and two mortars. The British lost two men killed and five wounded.

== Fate ==
Berwick was broken up in 1821.
