= HMS Loring =

Frigate of the Royal Navy

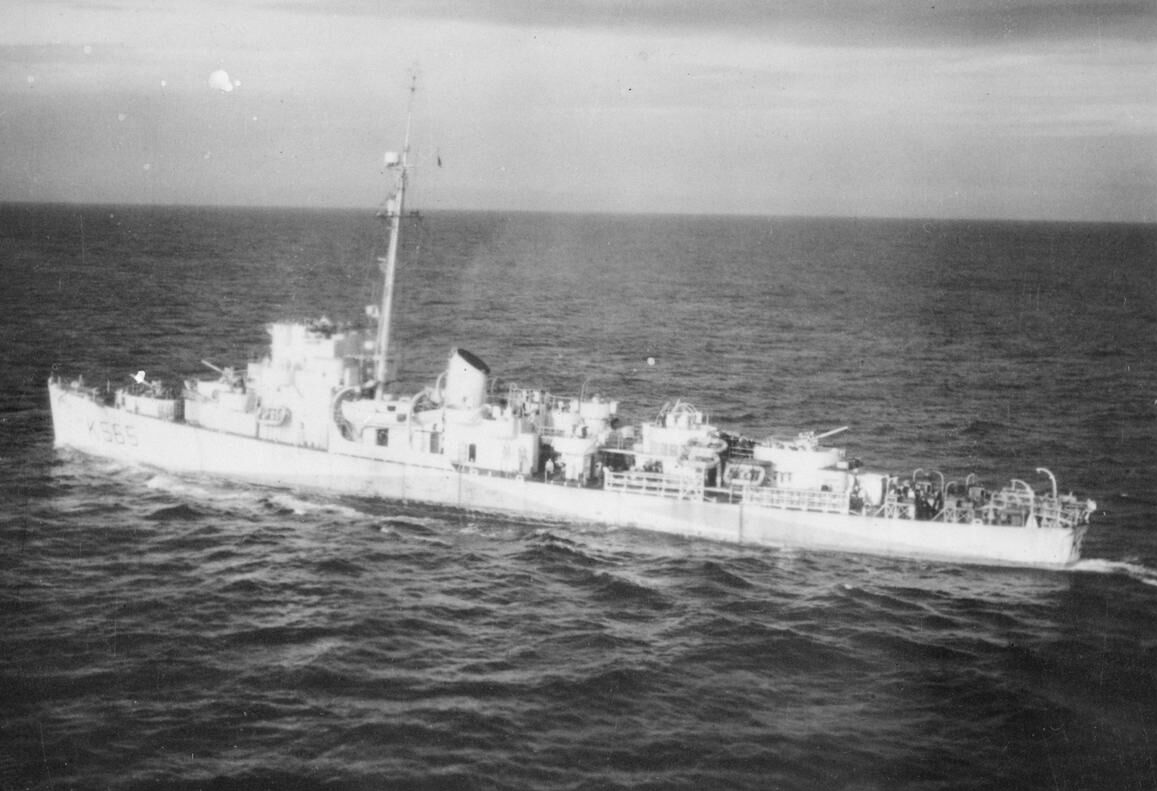
- HMS Loring on 26 August 1944

History

United States
- Name: unnamed (DE-520)
- Builder: Boston Navy Yard, Boston, Massachusetts
- Laid down: 18 July 1943
- Launched: 30 August 1943
- Completed: November 1943
- Fate: Transferred to United Kingdom November 1943
- Acquired: Returned by United Kingdom, 7 January 1947
- Fate: Sold for scrap by 27 March 1947

United Kingdom
- Name: HMS Loring (K565)
- Namesake: Admiral Sir John Wentworth Loring
- Acquired: November 1943
- Commissioned: November 1943
- Decommissioned: By October 1945
- Identification: Pennant number: K565
- Fate: Returned to United States, 7 January 1947

General characteristics
- Class & type: Captain-class frigate
- Displacement: 1,190 long tons (1,210 t) (standard)
- Length: 289 ft 5 in (88.2 m)
- Beam: 35 ft 2 in (10.7 m)
- Draught: 10 ft 1 in (3.1 m)
- Installed power: 6,000 shp (4,500 kW) electric motors
- Propulsion: 2 shafts; 4 diesel engines
- Speed: 20 knots (37 km/h; 23 mph)
- Range: 6,000 nmi (11,000 km; 6,900 mi) at 12 knots (22 km/h; 14 mph)
- Complement: 198
- Sensors & processing systems: SA & SL type radars; Type 144 series Asdic; MF Direction Finding; HF Direction Finding
- Armament: 3 × single 3 in (76 mm)/50 Mk 22 guns; 1 × twin Bofors 40 mm; 9 × single 20 mm Oerlikon guns; 1 × Hedgehog anti-submarine mortar; 2 × Depth charge rails and four throwers

HMS Loring (K565) was a British Captain-class frigate of the Royal Navy in commission during World War II. Originally constructed as the United States Navy Evarts-class destroyer escort DE-520, she served in the Royal Navy from 1943 to 1945.

== Description ==
The Evarts-class ships had an overall length of 289 feet 5 inches (88.2 m), a beam of 35 feet 2 inches (10.7 m), and a draught of 10 feet 1 inch (3.1 m) at full load. They displaced 1,190 long tons (1,210 t) at (standard) and 1,416 long tons (1,439 t) at full load. The ships had a diesel–electric powertrain derived from a submarine propulsion system with four General Motors 16-cylinder diesel engines providing power to four General Electric electric generators which sent electricity to four 1,500-shaft-horsepower (1,100 kW) General Electric electric motors which drove the two propeller shafts. The destroyer escorts had enough power give them a speed of 20 knots (37 km/h; 23 mph) and enough fuel oil to give them a range of 6,000 nautical miles (11,000 km; 6,900 mi) at 12 knots (22 km/h; 14 mph). Their crew consisted of 198 officers and ratings.

The armament of the Evarts-class ships in British service consisted of three single mounts for 50-caliber 3-inch (76 mm)/50 Mk 22 dual-purpose guns; one superfiring pair forward of the bridge and the third gun aft of the superstructure. Anti-aircraft defence was intended to consisted of a twin-gun mount for 40-millimetre (1.6 in) Bofors anti-aircraft (AA) guns atop the rear superstructure with nine 20-millimetre (0.8 in) Oerlikon AA guns located on the superstructure, but production shortages meant that that not all guns were fitted, or that additional Oerlikons replaced the Bofors guns. A Mark 10 Hedgehog anti-submarine mortar was positioned just behind the forward gun. The ships were also equipped with two depth charge rails at the stern and four "K-gun" depth charge throwers.

== Construction and career ==
The ship was laid down by the Boston Navy Yard in Boston, Massachusetts, on 18 July 1943 as the unnamed U.S. Navy destroyer escort DE-520 and launched on 30 August 1943. The United States transferred the ship to the United Kingdom under Lend-Lease upon completion sometime in November 1943 and commissioned into service in the Royal Navy as HMS Loring (K565), sources vary on the exact date. simultaneously with her transfer. She served on patrol and escort duty in the eastern North Atlantic for the remainder of World War II.

The Royal Navy decommissioned Loring by October 1945 after the conclusion of the war and returned her to the U.S. Navy while the ship was still in the United Kingdom on 7 January 1947. Loring was subsequently sold for scrap and departed Preston on 27 March 1947, bound for Greece to begin breaking up.
