= John Wentworth Loring =

Royal Navy Admiral (1775–1852)

Admiral Sir John Wentworth Loring KCB KCH
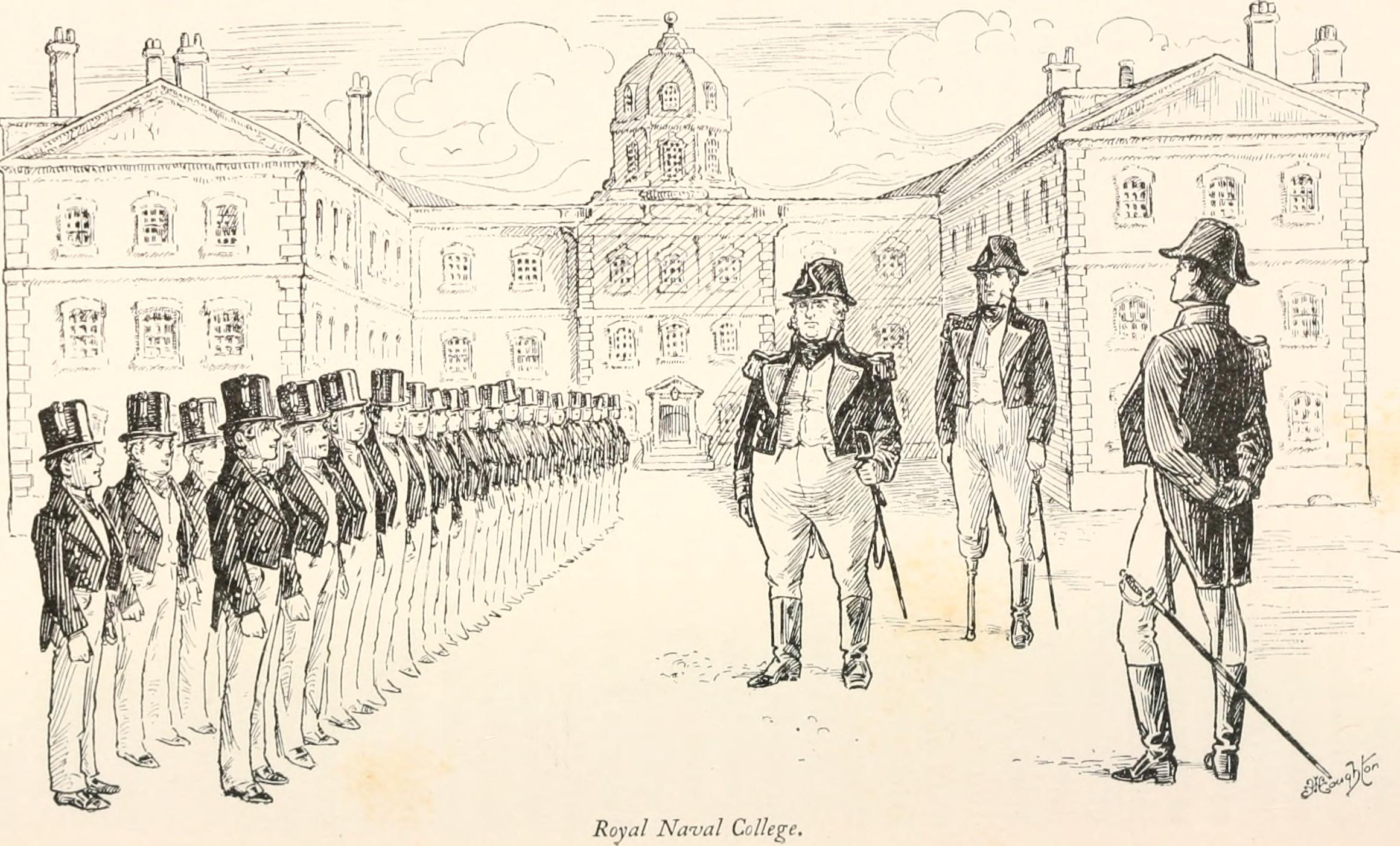
- Henry Keppel amongst those being reviewed in 1822 by Loring, lieutenant governor of the Royal Naval College, and Lieutenant John Wood Rouse
- Born: 13 October 1775; Massachusetts
- Died: 29 July 1852 (aged 76); Ryde, Isle of Wight
- Military career
- Allegiance: United Kingdom
- Branch: Royal Navy
- Service years: 1789–1852
- Rank: Admiral
- Conflicts: French Revolutionary Wars; Siege of Toulon; Siege of Bastia; Battle of Genoa; Battle of Hyères Islands; Napoleonic Wars; Action of 13 November 1810; Action of 24 March 1811
- Awards: Knight Commander of the Royal Guelphic Order; Knight Commander of the Bath

Admiral Sir John Wentworth Loring, KCB, KCH (13 October 1775 – 29 July 1852) was a Royal Navy officer of the early nineteenth century who is best known for his service in the Napoleonic Wars as a frigate commander. Born in the Thirteen Colonies at the outbreak of the American War of Independence, Loring's family fled to Britain and he subsequently joined the Royal Navy aged 13. In 1793, aged 17, Loring was badly wounded in combat at the start of the French Revolutionary Wars. He subsequently served throughout the following 23 years of warfare between Britain and France, achieving success in command of the frigate HMS Niobe. After the war he served in an influential position at the Royal Naval College, Portsmouth and eventually became a full admiral.

== Life ==
John Loring was born in October 1775 at the start of the American War of Independence to Joshua Loring, High Sheriff of Massachusetts. John's grandfather, Joshua Loring, had served in the navy in the Seven Years' War, commanding a squadron on the Great Lakes. The Loring family were Loyalists, and were ultimately forced to flee to Britain. In 1789, 13-year-old John Loring joined the Royal Navy, serving in HMS Salisbury before joining HMS Victory at the outbreak of the French Revolutionary Wars. Loring was badly wounded early in the conflict at the Siege of Toulon, but in 1794 was in independent command of a gunboat at the Siege of Bastia and later served in the sloop HMS Fleche before joining Admiral Sir Hyde Parker's flagship HMS St George, seeing combat at the Battle of Genoa and the Battle of Hyères Islands in 1795.

In 1796, Loring served in HMS Britannia before joining HMS Comet in the West Indies. Over the next five years, Loring commanded a succession of ships, including HMS Rattler, HMS Lark, HMS Abergavenny and HMS Syren, operating against French privateers with some success and subduing a mutiny in his last command. For this service he was promoted to post captain by Rear-Admiral John Thomas Duckworth. Following the Peace of Amiens, Loring took command of HMS Utrecht. He subsequently returned to Europe, and was eventually given command of HMS Niobe in the blockade of France.

Loring served in Niobe for eight years, capturing numerous French merchant vessels and small warships. Two particularly notable exploits were the destruction of French frigates at the action of 13 November 1810 and the action of 24 March 1811. He finished the war as captain of HMS Impregnable, the flagship of the North Sea fleet. In 1816, Loring was superintendent of the ordinary (or reserve) at Sheerness and in 1819 he became lieutenant governor of the Royal Naval College, Portsmouth. He held this latter position for 18 years. Retiring in 1837 a rear-admiral, Loring was made a Knight Commander of the Royal Guelphic Order and in 1840 a Knight Commander of the Bath, having been a Companion of the Order of the Bath since 1815. He was also promoted, becoming a vice-admiral in 1846 and a full admiral in 1851.

Loring had married, in 1804, Anna Patton, daughter of Vice-Admiral Philip Patton. They had two sons, including William Loring who later also became an admiral, and three daughters. Loring died at his estate in Ryde, Isle of Wight in July 1852.

He also lived at Peartree House, near Peartree Green, Southampton from 1842 until his death.

== Ship ==
The British Navy ship HMS Loring (K565) was named after him.

== See also ==
- O'Byrne, William Richard (1849). "Loring, John Wentworth" . A Naval Biographical Dictionary . John Murray – via Wikisource.
