= Tatihou =

Tidal island of Normandy in France

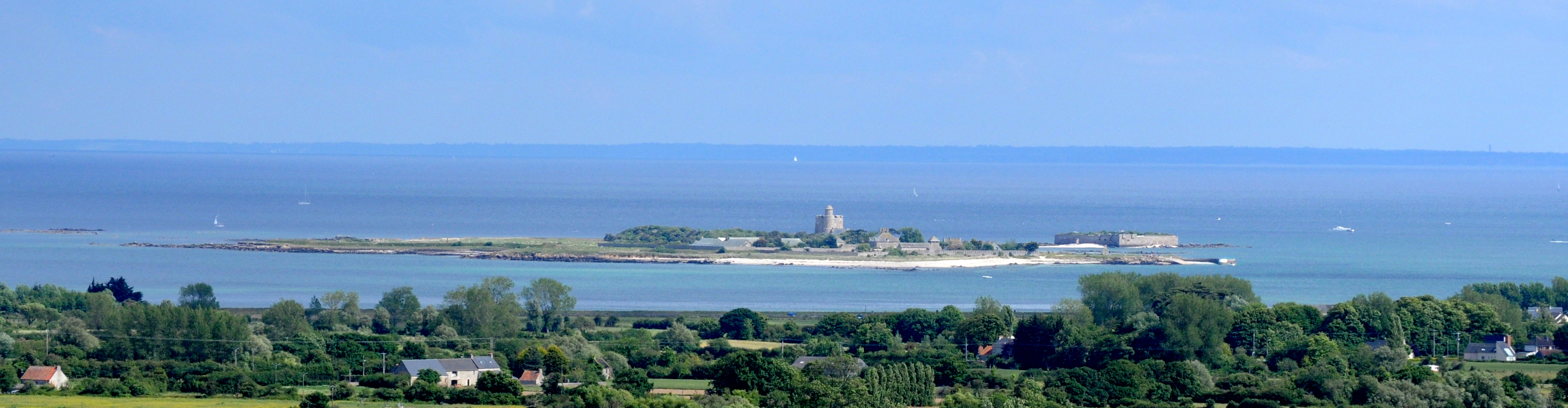
- Tatihou seen from La Pernelle

- Location within France

Geography
- Location: English Channel
- Coordinates: 49°35′20″N 1°14′36″W
- Area: 0.29 km^{2} (0.11 sq mi)

Administration
- France
- Region: Normandy
- Department: Manche
- Commune: Saint-Vaast-la-Hougue

Demographics
- Population: 0

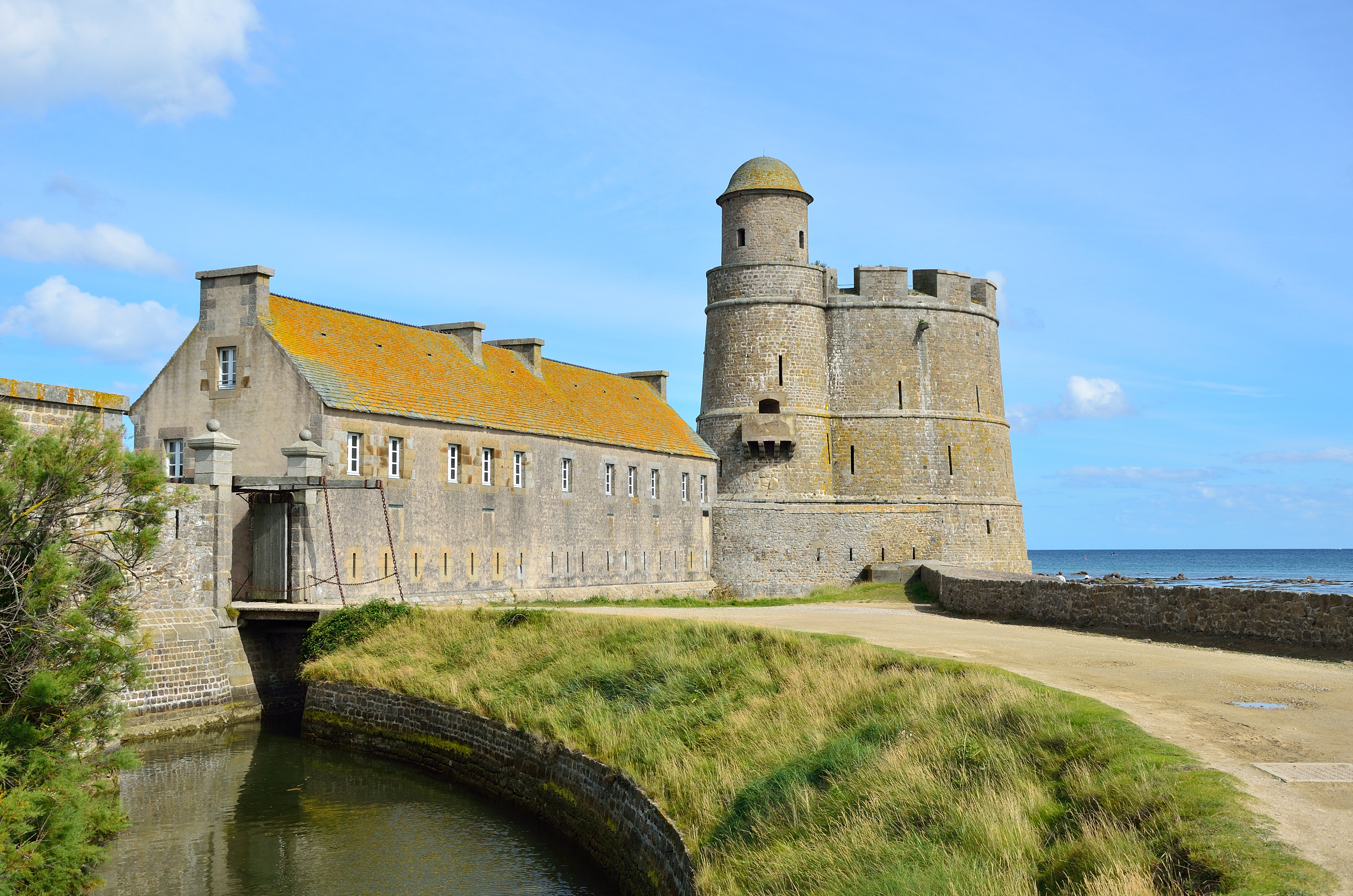
Vauban's tower in Tatihou

Tatihou is an islet of Normandy in France with an area of 29 hectares (72 acres). It is located to the east of the Cotentin peninsula just off the coast near Saint-Vaast-la-Hougue. It is almost uninhabited, and is usually reached by amphibious craft although, being a tidal island, it is also possible to walk there over the local oyster beds at low tide. Access to the island is limited to 500 visitors per day.

== History ==
Tatihou, like the names of many of the islets of the Channel Islands, contains the -hou suffix.

In 1692 the naval Battle of La Hougue took place between the English and the French close to the island of Tatihou. In 1756 the surroundings of La Hougue were defended by many batteries and forts, but the lack of regular maintenance ensured that these quickly fell into disrepair. In 1720 Tatihou was used for quarantining plague victims from Marseille.

On 10 December 1803, the 36-gun frigate HMS Shannon grounded on Tatihou. All her crew survived to be captured by troops from a battery. The next day a party from HMS Merlin burned Shannon to prevent her arms and stores falling into French hands.

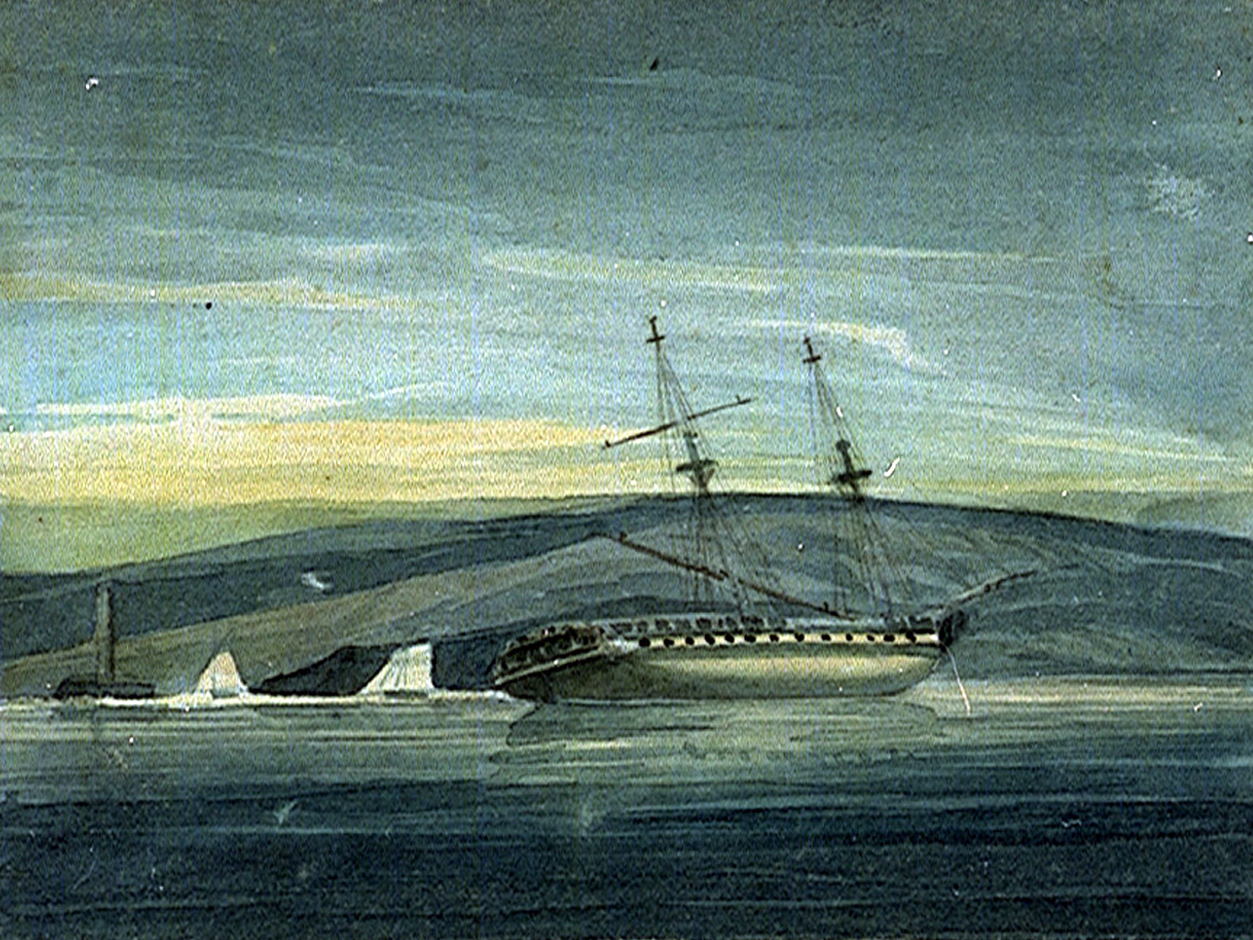
Shannon on shore, by Edward Pelham Brenton, c.1803, in the National Maritime Museum, Greenwich

== Culture ==
Tatihou has hosted a small folk festival since 1995, Les Traversées de Tatihou, every August 15. The hours are selected according to the tides to allow the festival goers to get home. The island also hosts music courses several times a year.

The watch-tower on Tatihou is among the Fortifications of Vauban UNESCO World Heritage Sites.

== Flora and fauna ==
An ornithological reserve was founded in 1990 with an area of 3 hectares (7.4 acres). The island is a stopping place for many migrating birds, including the herring gull, great black-backed gull, common shelduck, little egret, eider, wigeon and yellow-legged gull. There is also a botanical garden on the island.

== Twinning ==
Tatihou is twinned with:

- Brownsea Island, United Kingdom
