= Gatteville Lighthouse =

Gatteville Lighthouse Phare de Gatteville
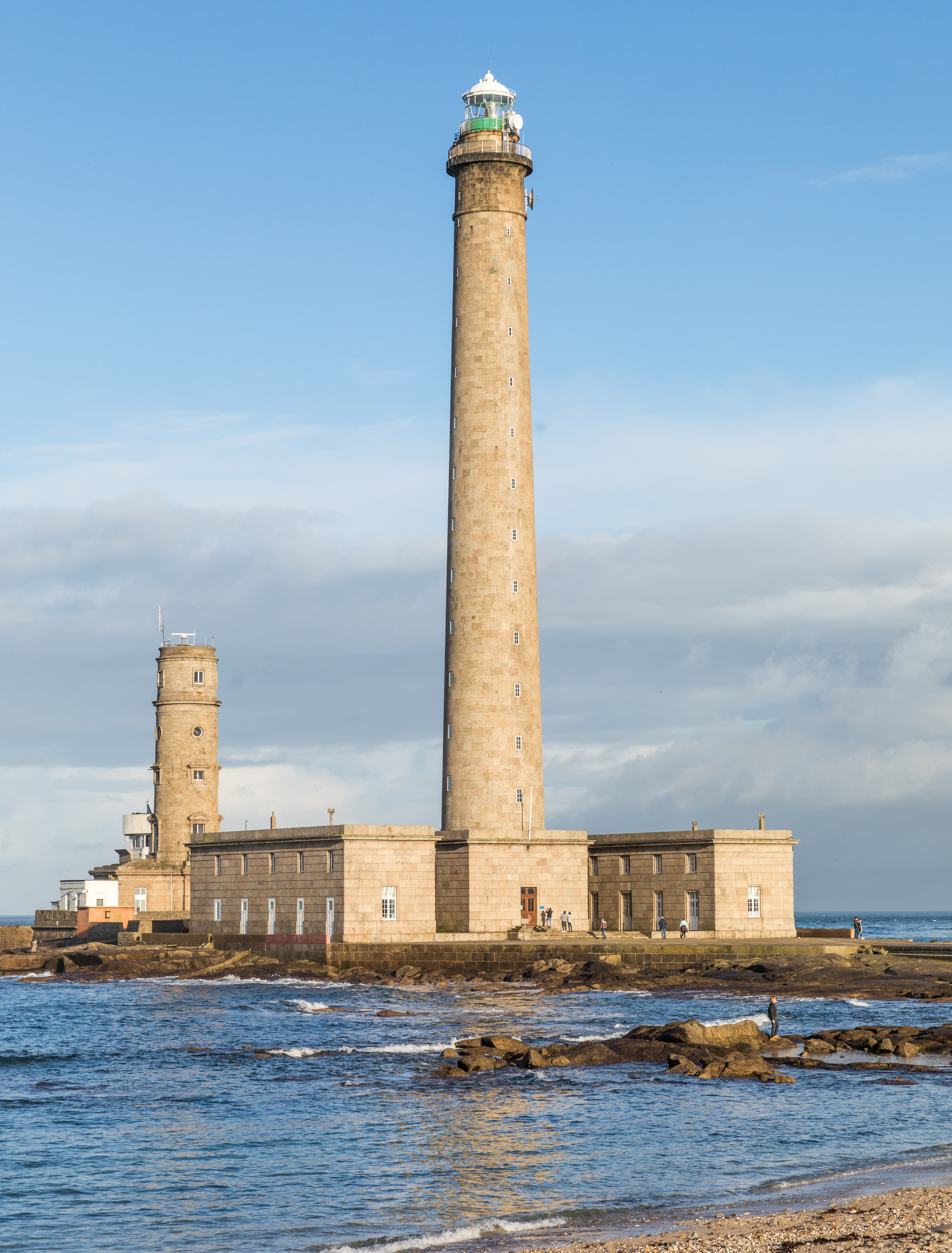
- Phare de Gatteville in 2021
- Location: Gatteville-le-Phare, France
- Coordinates: 49°41′47″N 1°15′57″W

Tower
- Constructed: 1834
- Designed by: Charles-Félix Morice de la Rue
- Construction: granite (tower)
- Automated: 1982
- Height: 247 feet (75 m)
- Shape: cylindrical tower attached to 2-story keeper's complex with balcony and lantern
- Markings: unpainted (tower), black (lantern)
- Heritage: classified historical monument
- Fog signal: Horn: (60 meters N.E.) 2 bl. ev. 60s (bl. 2s, si. 3s, bl. 2s, si. 53s).

Light
- First lit: 1 April 1835
- Focal height: 236 feet (72 m)
- Lens: 300mm
- Range: 25 nmi (46 km; 29 mi)
- Characteristic: Fl(2) W 10s
- Barfleur Lighthouse
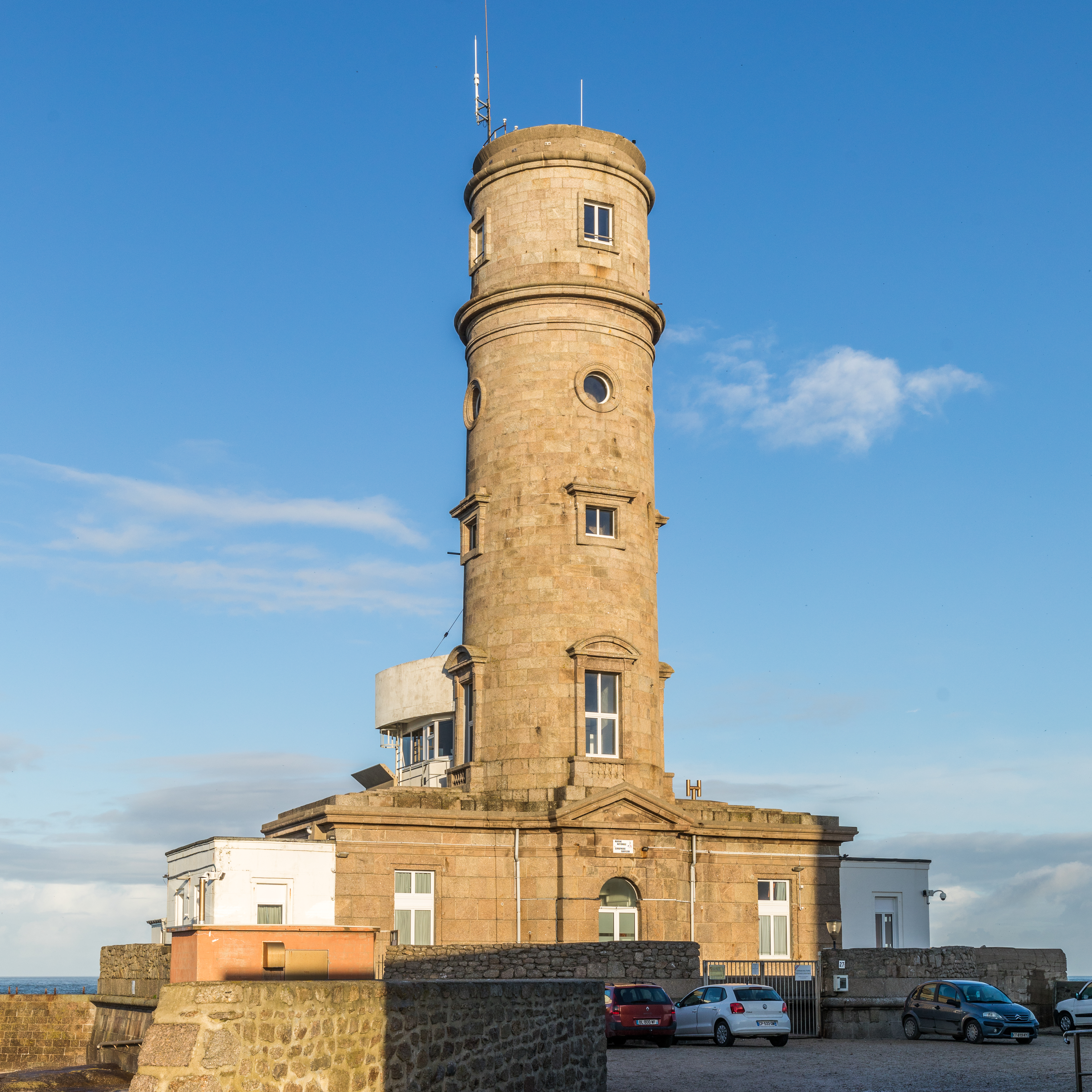
- Constructed: 1780
- Construction: granite
- Height: 25 m (82 ft)
- Heritage: monument historique inscrit
- First lit: 1 November 1775
- Deactivated: 1835

Phare de Gatteville, also known as Pointe de Barfleur Light, is an active lighthouse near Gatteville-le-Phare at the tip of Barfleur, Manche department, in the Normandy region of France. At a height of 247 feet (75 m) it is the third tallest "traditional lighthouse" in the world.

== History ==
Strong currents and many shipwrecks at the tip of Barfleur, the most famous of which being the White Ship, necessitated building a lighthouse at the location. In 1774 a cylindrical 25 metres (82 ft) granite lighthouse with a stone rectangular main building were built. The lighthouse was topped with a coal fire. It was first lit on November 1, 1775, and was originally called Phare de Barfleur (Barfleur Lighthouse).

In September 1780 the lantern was replaced with 16 oil lamps with a fire glazed glass lantern and Tourtille-Sangrain reflectors.

In 1825 an upgrade of the lens was planned, requiring raising the tower an additional 32 metres (105 ft), but the building proved not to be wide enough. Thus, the architect Charles-Félix Morice de la Rue drew plans for the tallest lighthouse in the world for that time. It was built 60 metres (200 ft) from the old lighthouse. Building took place from 1829 to 1835 and the light was first lit on April 1, 1835. The smaller tower's lantern was removed, and it was turned into a semaphore. It remains on site.

Vegetable oil was used until 1873, when it was replaced by mineral oil. On May 20, 1891, the name of the lighthouse was changed to Phare de Gatteville (Gatteville Lighthouse). On January 17, 1893, the lantern was replaced with an electric lantern.

Sautter-Harle mercury bearings were installed in 1903.

In 1944 the lighthouse was liberated without major damage and quickly returned to operation. In 1948 it was connected to the electrical network.

The lighthouse remained open to the public until 1996, when it was closed for renovation. It reopened July 5, 1997, as a lighthouse museum.

== Structure and light ==
The tower is cylindrical with a gallery and a lantern. It is 25 metres (82 ft) in diameter at the base and 6 metres (20 ft) at the bridge. It is attached to a 2-story keeper's complex which forms a U-shape around the base of the tower. Visitors can climb 365 stairs to reach the gallery.

The current light is a 1600 watt xenon lamp. One lamp is lit on clear days and two on bad weather.

== Appearance in media ==
The 1981 film Diva by Jean-Jacques Beineix was partially shot at the lighthouse.

== See also ==
- List of lighthouses in France
- List of tallest lighthouses in the world
