= Ship's boat =

Utility vessel

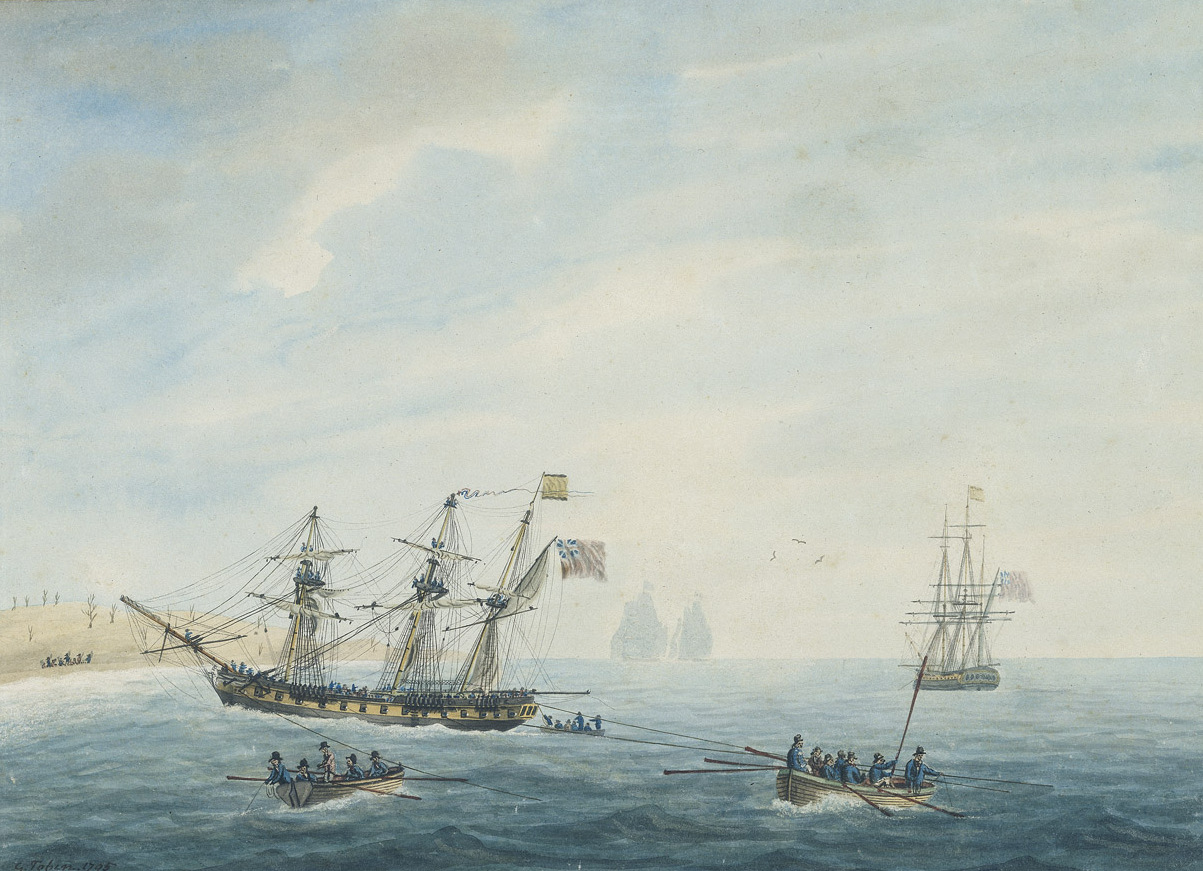
HMS Thetis run aground in North Carolina, 1794. Her boats have just laid two kedge anchors to haul her off and are now sounding the depth of the water in the region of the anchors.

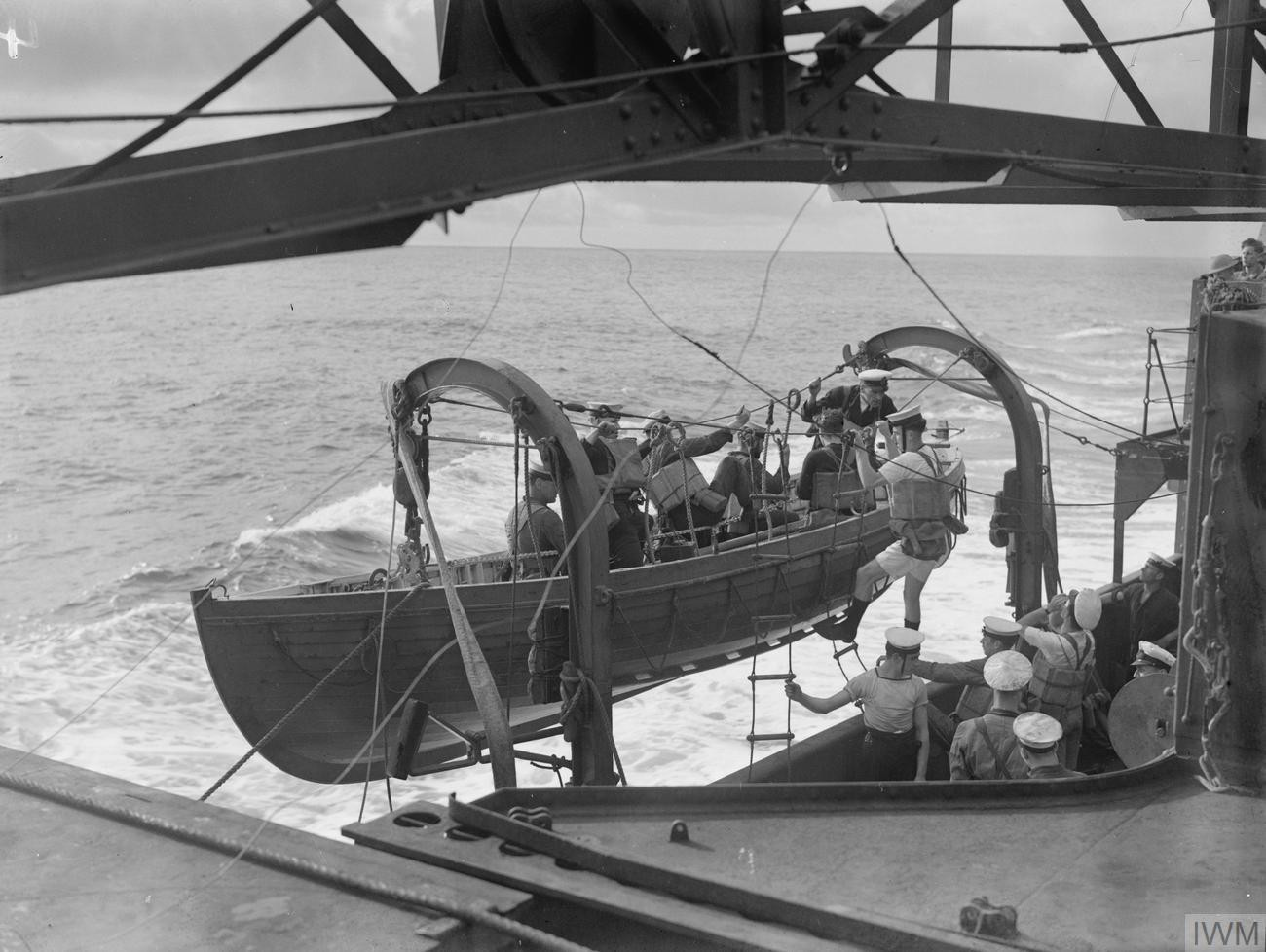
A Royal Navy Montagu whaler being manned with an armed boarding party to check a neutral vessel stopped at sea, October 1941

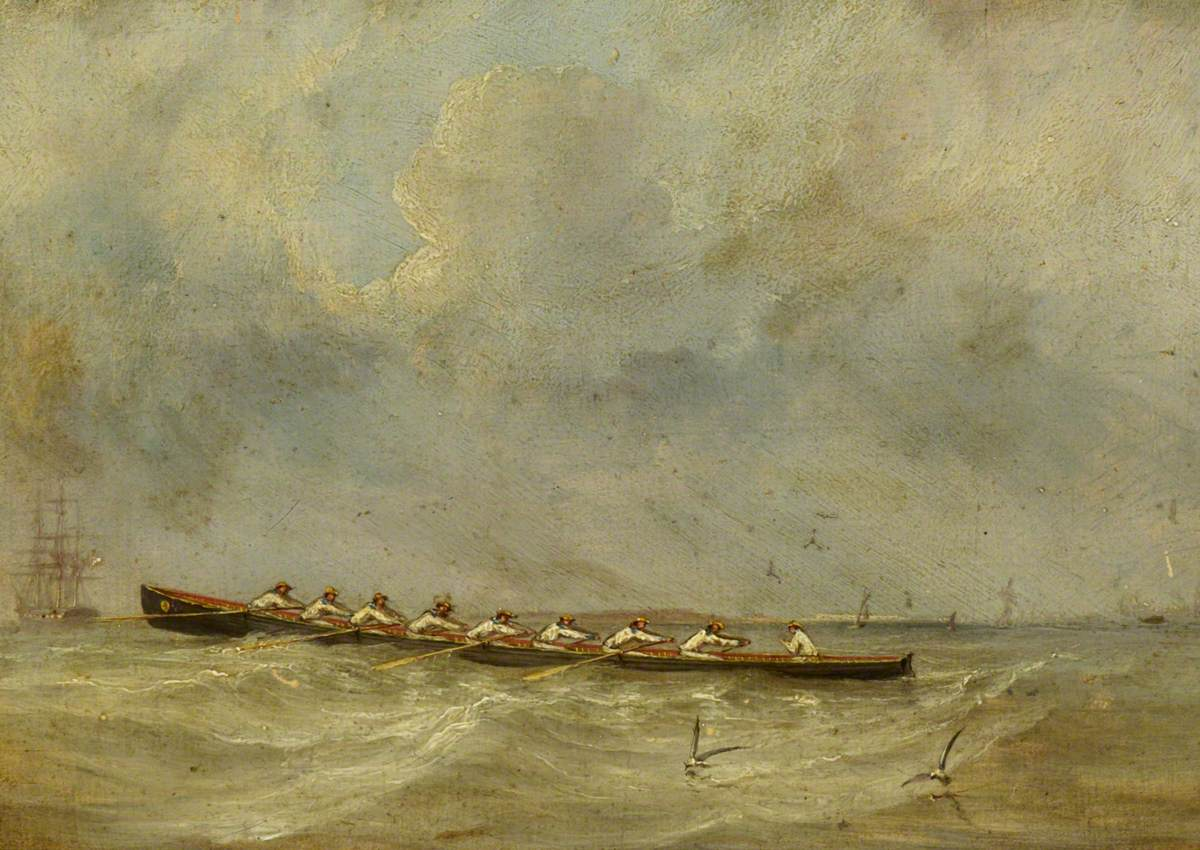
1834 painting of HMS Pique's gig by John Christian Schetky

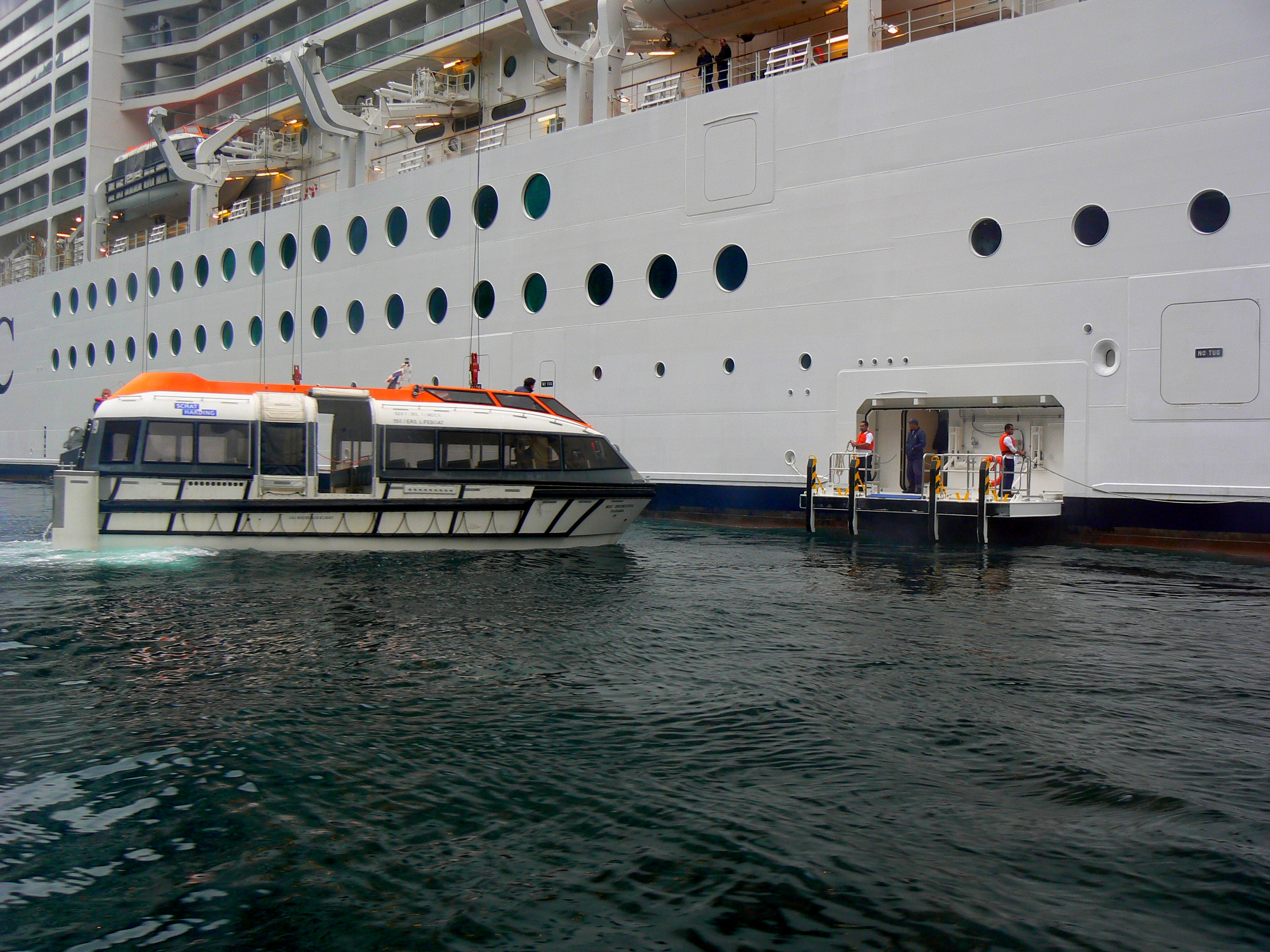
A ship's tender of MSC Orchestra

A ship's boat is a utility boat carried by a larger vessel. Ship's boats have always provided transport between the shore and other ships. Other work done by such boats has varied over time, as technology has changed. In the age of sail, especially for warships, an important role was the collection of drinking water. The use of radio, followed by telex, e-mail, etc. has reduced and then replaced the need for written communications to be delivered. A large enough boat may be needed to carry an anchor to some distance away from the ship, so as to kedge out of a harbour or away from a hazard – and also to recover such an anchor afterwards. Warships have always used their boats as an extension to their military role. This includes the provision of a means of escape for the crews of fireships, the landing of troops, or the "cutting out" raids that were used by the Royal Navy, especially during the Napoleonic Wars. All these requirements competed with the need to be able to stow the boats on board in a way that did not interfere with the normal operation of the ship.

Historically, ship’s boats had different names depending on their role. During the Age of Sail, this included the longboat, captain's gig, jolly boat, and other forms and designations. The terminology was not totally precise and has some variations with time and place. For example, there is reason to believe that the same actual boat could have been issued to one ship as an admiral's barge and then at a later date be used as a captain's pinnace. Similarly, the steam pinnaces issued to warships in the decades around 1900 were habitually called "steam picket boats", so one type of boat had two names.

In modern times, some of the older nomenclature persists, especially in military circles. This reinforces the view that the names refer to the role of a boat, more than to its design and method of construction.

== Types ==
Different types of boat were usually carried on an individual ship, to fulfil different roles. The names and designs of boat varied over time, dictated by changing requirements and new design options being available. The commonest of these are:

- Cockboat, an early type of ship's boat, existing in 1485 (and probably some time before). Where a ship was equipped with three boats, the cockboat was the one of middle size, the others being the great boat (the largest) and the jollywatt. The larger two boats were equipped for laying out anchors. All three had sails as well as oars.
- Admiral's barge
- Gig
- Cutter
- Dinghy
- Jolly boat
- Longboat
- Pinnace (a larger full-rigged pinnace is a different class of vessel)
- Whaleboat
- Yawl, similar to a pinnace, but smaller, usually with four or six oars

== Age of Sail ==
=== History ===
In the Age of Sail, a ship carried a variety of boats of various sizes and for different purposes. In the navies they were: (1) the launch, or long-boat, the largest of all rowboats on board, which was of full, flat, and high built; (2) the barge, the next in size, which was employed for carrying commanding officers, with ten or twelve oars (3) the pinnace, which was used for transporting subordinate officers, with six or eight oars (4) the yawl, a smaller pinnace; (5) the cutter, which was shorter and broader than the long-boat and used for the transfer of goods (6) the jolly boat, used for light work; (7) the gig, a long narrow boat, employed for expeditious rowing and fitted with sails, and belonging to the captain.

A merchant ship usually carried on board: (1) the launch or long-boat; (2) the skiff, the next in size and used for towing or kedging; (3) the jolly boat or yawl, the third in size (4) the quarter-boat, which was longer than the jolly-boat and named thus because it was hung on davits at a ship's quarter; (5) the captain’s gig, which was one of the quarter boats.

=== Roles ===
One of the main roles of a ship's boat was to act as a taxi to move stores and people between shore and ship, and between ships. Although some boats were general purpose in nature, boats such as the Captain's gig and the Admiral's barge were for the exclusive use of officers. It was also the role of a military vessel's boats to act as landing craft, to deliver boarders and cutting-out (night attack) parties. Boats were also sometimes armed with a single bow-mounted, forward-firing, smoothbore cannon to function as small gunboats, boats so equipped would support landing operations and act as picket boats for ships at anchor.

When a ship was becalmed, mastless, run aground or otherwise unable to move, a ship's boat allowed the ship to be kedged or warped ahead. The ship's anchor and cable would be rowed a distance from the ship before being laid, the crew would then man the ship's capstans to haul the ship forward, repeated as many times as needed. Multiple ship’s boats could also be manned to physically tow the ship.

The ship's boats could also be used as lifeboats and rescue boats when needed.

=== Storage ===
During the age of sail the ship's boats of larger ships of the line would be stowed upon the deck, sometimes nested one atop the other. Boats would be deployed and recovered by davits with some vessels carrying a single small boat suspended astern. In the smallest vessels a ship's boat was also on occasion towed astern. Boats stored on deck in tropical climates were usually partially filled with water to prevent the wooden hull planks drying out and shrinking, which would make the boat leak once it was placed in water until the wood swelled up again.

When a warship was going into action her boats were usually towed astern. This freed space on the deck, reduced the possibility of the boats being damaged by gunfire and prevented the boats becoming a major source of dangerous splinters if they were left on deck. If a ship was spending a long period at anchor (such as during a spell in a home port when the boats would be regularly employed moving people and supplies between ship and shore) it was common to rig a boat boom perpendicular to the hull of the ship. The boats would then be moored to this, ready for use as required. This saved the manpower and time needed to hoist a boat into and out of the water whenever it was needed.

== Age of steam ==
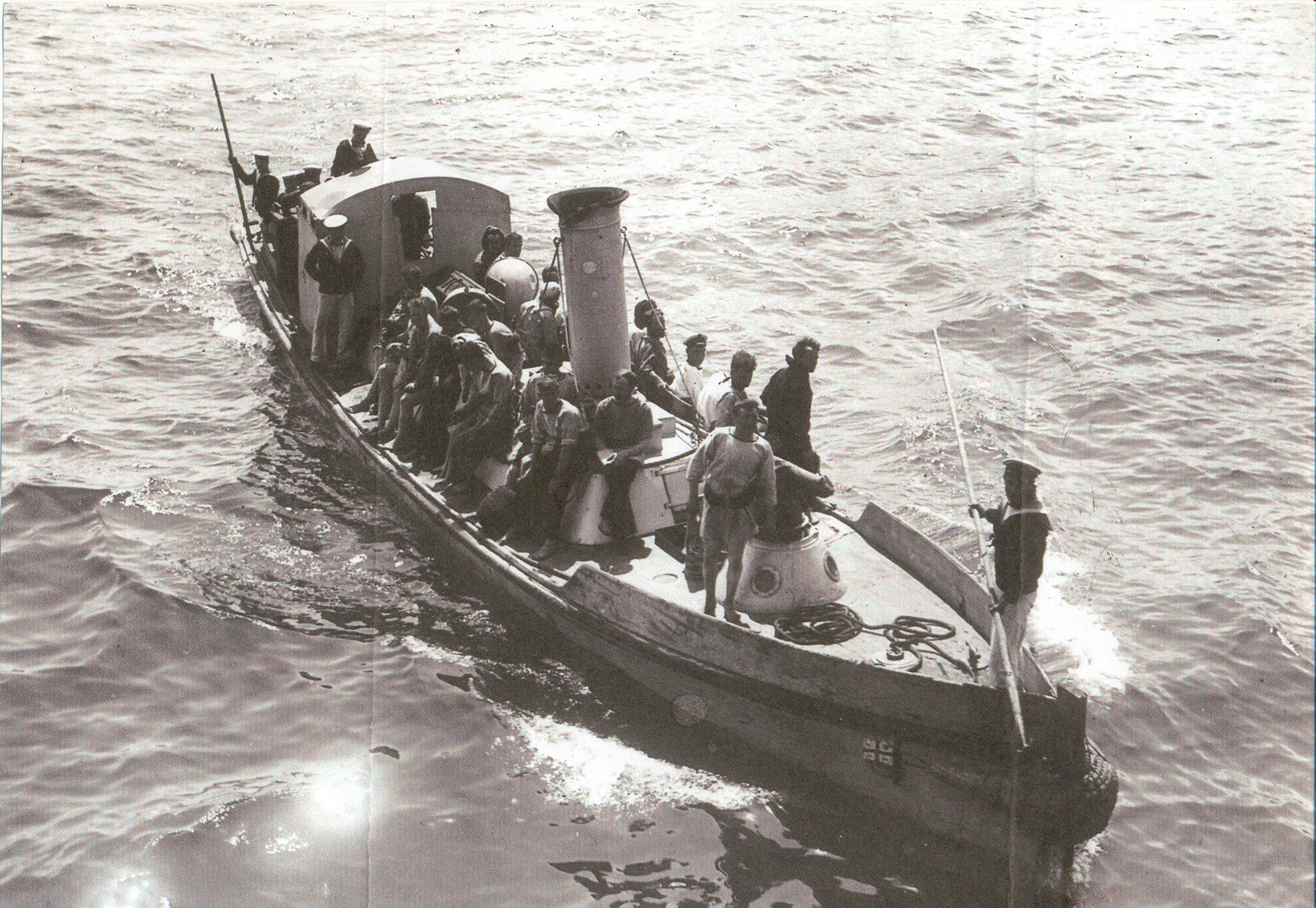
A British 56-foot (17 m) picket boat, returning to HMS Triumph after participating in action on April 18, 1915

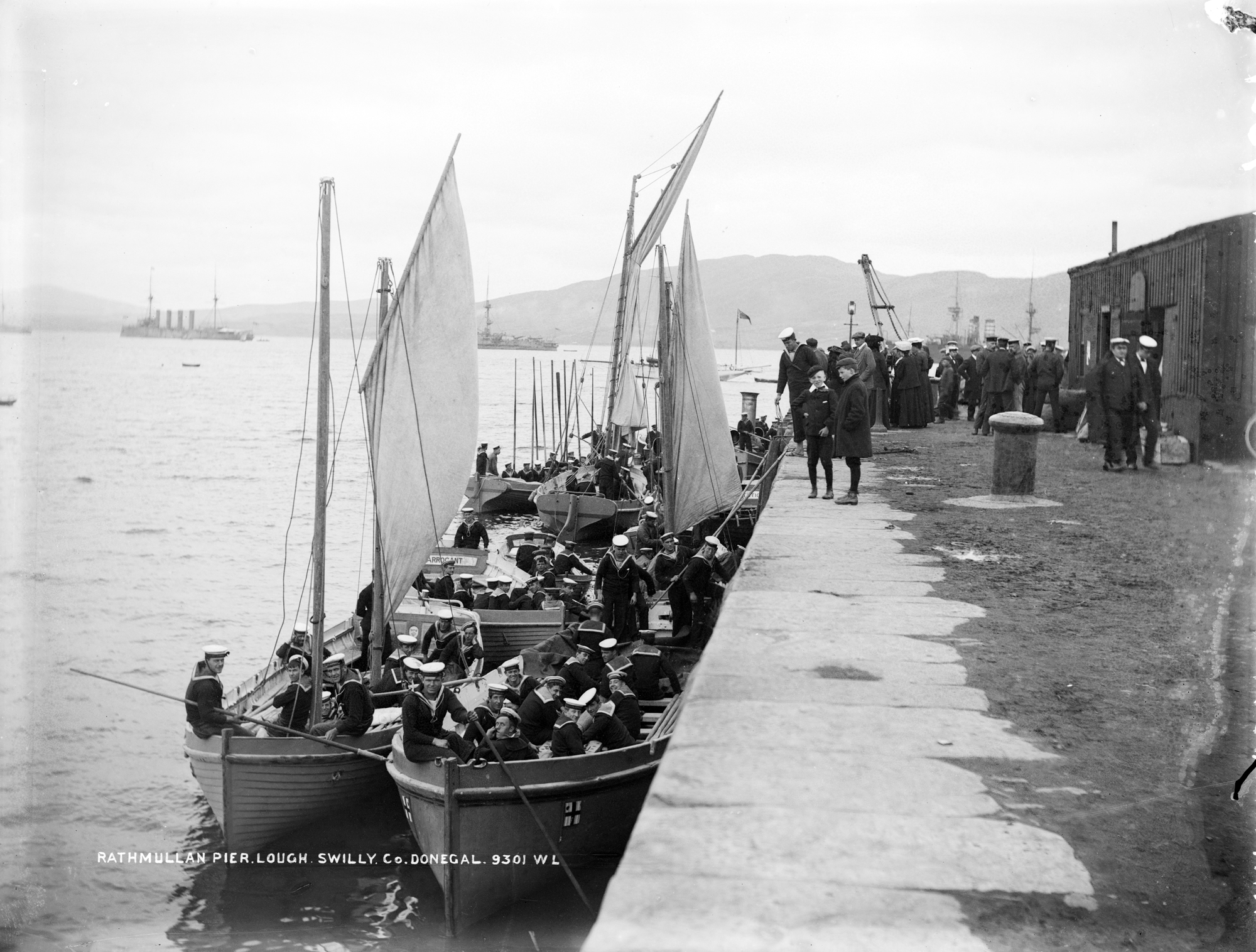
A selection of boats from a Royal Navy squadron in 1909. (Note: The squadron that visited Lough Swilly in 1909 consisted of HMS Arrogant (1896), HMS Majestic (1895), HMS King Edward VII, HMS Amethyst (1903), HMS Diamond, HMS Magnificent (1894), HMS New Zealand (1904), HMS Commonwealth, HMS Drake (1901), HMS Berwick (1902), HMS Duke of Edinburgh and HMS Cornwall (1902).) This demonstrates the continued extensive use of boats propelled by oar and sail at a time when all the warships used steam. The funnel of one steam pinnace can be seen in the picture.

The transition from a sailing navy to one powered by steam removed one ship's boat task and greatly reduced another. Steam ships could distil drinking water from seawater. Warships no longer needed boats that maximised their ability to carry water casks. This meant that the range of sizes of boats could be reduced, as a warship could make do with a slightly smaller boat than the largest she could fit, as it did not compromise their watering ability. The other task that changed was anchor work. Steam power reduced the need for kedging a ship in or out of a harbour. So the ability to carry an anchor and cable, though still an essential part of the seamanship of the steam navy, was much less of a common task.

Navies were slow to use steam power in their ship's boats. The Royal Navy experimented with one in 1848, getting rid of it two years later. The next involvement was in 1864. Six ships were each supplied with a standard launch fitted with a steam engine. In the following years, their numbers were increased and, in 1867, a 36 feet (11 m) steam pinnace was successfully trialled and produced in a range of sizes. Steam cutters were the next to be introduced.

By 1877, steam boats had a clear presence among the range of boats carried by warships. However, they were in an obvious minority, with large numbers of boats propelled by sail and oar continuing to be used through to the First World War. With the outbreak of war, motor boats were introduced to improve efficiency. However, sail and oar remained common through both world wars.

In the Royal Navy, the steam pinnace acquired the role of patrolling the entrances to anchorages to protect them from enemy torpedo boats. This gave them the name picket boat – examples from the 1890s measured 46 feet (14 m) and 50 feet (15 m). They had the capability to carry 14 inches (360 mm) torpedoes in mounts on either side of the hull (a feature introduced about 1875) and some were armed with a three pounder gun and/or a maxim machine-gun.

Steam boats were substantially heavier than boats powered by sail or oar. Not only was there the weight of the steam engine and boiler, there was also the water for the boiler and coal. A 56 feet (17 m) steam pinnace weighed 18 long tons 0 cwt (40,300 lb or 18.3 t) without her crew or any armament. A 37 feet (11 m) steam pinnace was 6 long tons 2 cwt (13,700 lb or 6.2 t) compared with a 38 feet (12 m) launch (oar and sail) at 3 long tons 18 cwt (8,700 lb or 4 t). Special derricks had to be used to lift these boats, as the davits used for the lighter engineless ones were insufficient.

Senior officers started to be assigned steam boats from 1882, when a steam cutter was provided for the sole use of the Commander-in-Chief of the East Indies station. Others were rapidly provided for Admirals with comparable commands – the next to be issued being a steam barge. These soon developed into a distinctive type, similar to the steam pinnaces, but with a long overhanging counter, rather than the transom stern of the more ordinary craft. Lengths were 32 feet (9.8 m) or 40 feet (12 m) in the 1890s, with a 45 feet (14 m) version at the beginning of the next century.

== Today ==
Ships today from large cruise ships to small private yachts continue to carry ship's boats as tenders and lifeboats. Aboard military vessels, ship's boats, often rigid-hulled inflatables, continue to do many of the jobs expected of their Age of Sail predecessor.
