= HMS Diana (1794) =

Artois-class fifth-rate frigate of the Royal Navy

- Ship plan of Diana

History

United Kingdom
- Name: HMS Diana
- Ordered: 28 March 1793
- Builder: Randall & Brent, Rotherhithe
- Laid down: March 1793
- Launched: 3 March 1794
- Completed: 6 June 1794
- Out of service: Sold to the Dutch Navy on 7 March 1815
- Honours and awards: Naval General Service Medal with clasp "Egypt"

Netherlands
- Name: Diana
- Acquired: Bought from the British on 7 March 1815
- Fate: Destroyed in dry-dock accident on 16 January 1839

General characteristics
- Type: 38-gun Artois-class fifth-rate frigate
- Tons burthen: 999 3/94 bm
- Length: 146 ft 3 in (44.6 m) (overall); 121 ft 8 1/2 in (37.1 m) (keel)
- Beam: 39 ft 3 1/2 in (12.0 m)
- Depth of hold: 13 ft 9 in (4.19 m)
- Sail plan: Full-rigged ship
- Complement: 270 (later 315)
- Armament: Upper deck: 28 × 18-pounder guns; QD: 2 × 9-pounder guns + 12 × 32-pounder carronades; Fc: 2 × 9-pounder guns + 2 × 32-pounder carronades

HMS Diana was a 38-gun Artois-class fifth-rate frigate of the Royal Navy.

== British service ==
Diana was launched in 1794. Sometime in late January or February, 1800 she recaptured the American schooner Sally and Mary that had been captured by a French privateer. The schooner was sent in to St. Kitts.

Diana served in the Royal Navy's Egyptian campaign between 8 March 1801 and 2 September. Therefore, her officers and crew qualified for the clasp "Egypt" to the Naval General Service Medal that the Admiralty authorized in 1850 to all surviving claimants. (Note: A first-class share of the prize money awarded in April 1823 was worth £34 2s 4d; a fifth-class share, that of a seaman, was worth 3s 11½d. The amount was small as the total had to be shared between 79 vessels and the entire army contingent.)

Diana was at Tangiers 19 January, 1804. On 17 July, 1804 she was escorting a convoy from Cork to the Leeward Islands

Diana participated in an attack on a French frigate squadron anchored at Saint-Vaast-la-Hougue at the action of 15 November 1810, which ultimately led to the destruction of the French frigate Elisa. (Boats from Diana went in and set fire to the beached Eliza despite heavy fire from shore batteries and three nearby armed brigs; the British suffered no casualties.)

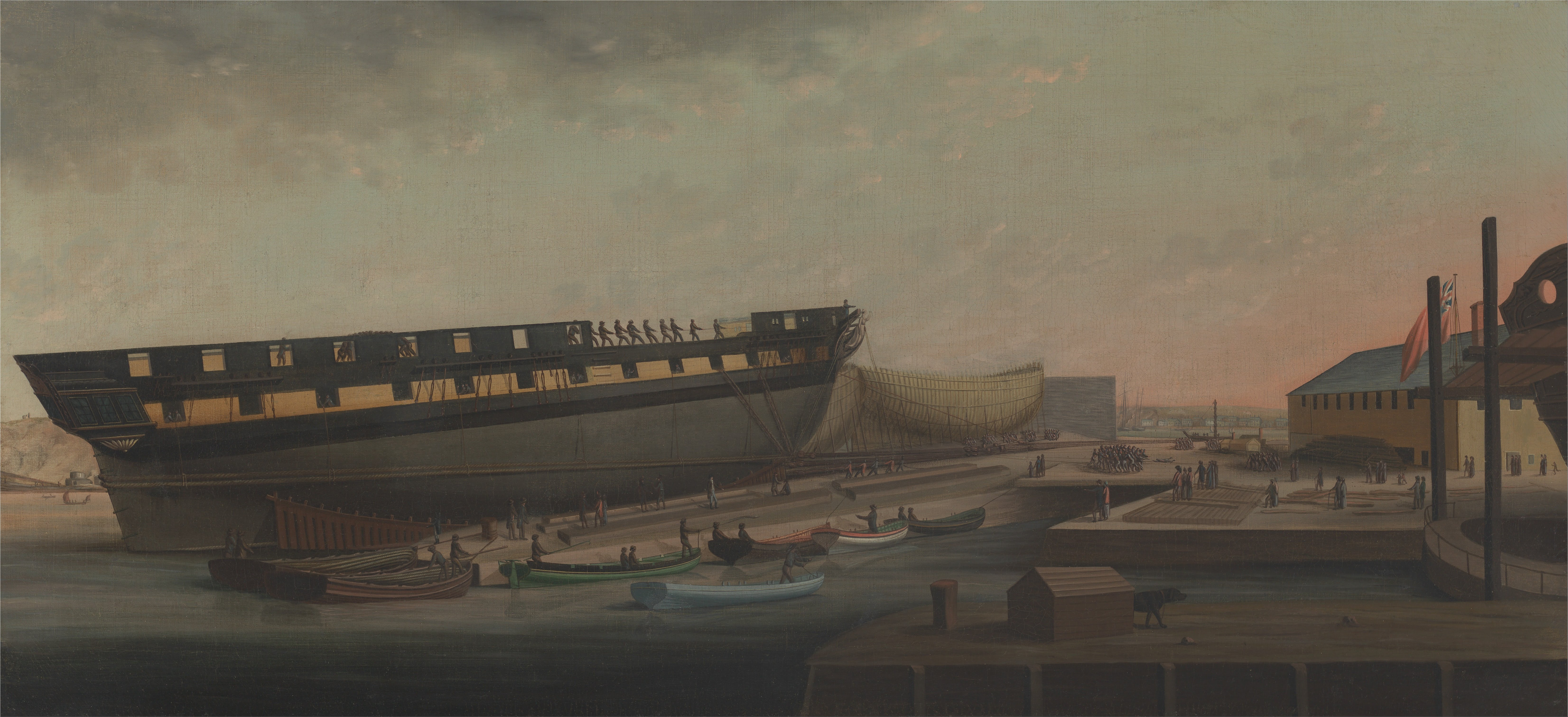
Diana being heaved up at Blackburn's Yard, Turnchapel on 10 March 1813

In January or February 1812, the French captured Patent, Gillespie, master. Diana recaptured Patent on 4 February. Patent arrived at Plymouth on 6 February.

== Dutch service ==
On 7 March 1815, Diana was sold to the Royal Netherlands Navy for £36,796. On 27 August 1816, Diana was one of five Dutch frigates and one corvette that participated in the bombardment of Algiers. Her captain then was Pieter Ziervogel. The ship suffered 6 dead and 22 wounded in the action. Diana was destroyed in a fire on 16 January 1839 while she was in Willemsoord Dry Dock I at Willemsoord, Den Helder.
