= Saint-Vaast-la-Hougue =

- Commune
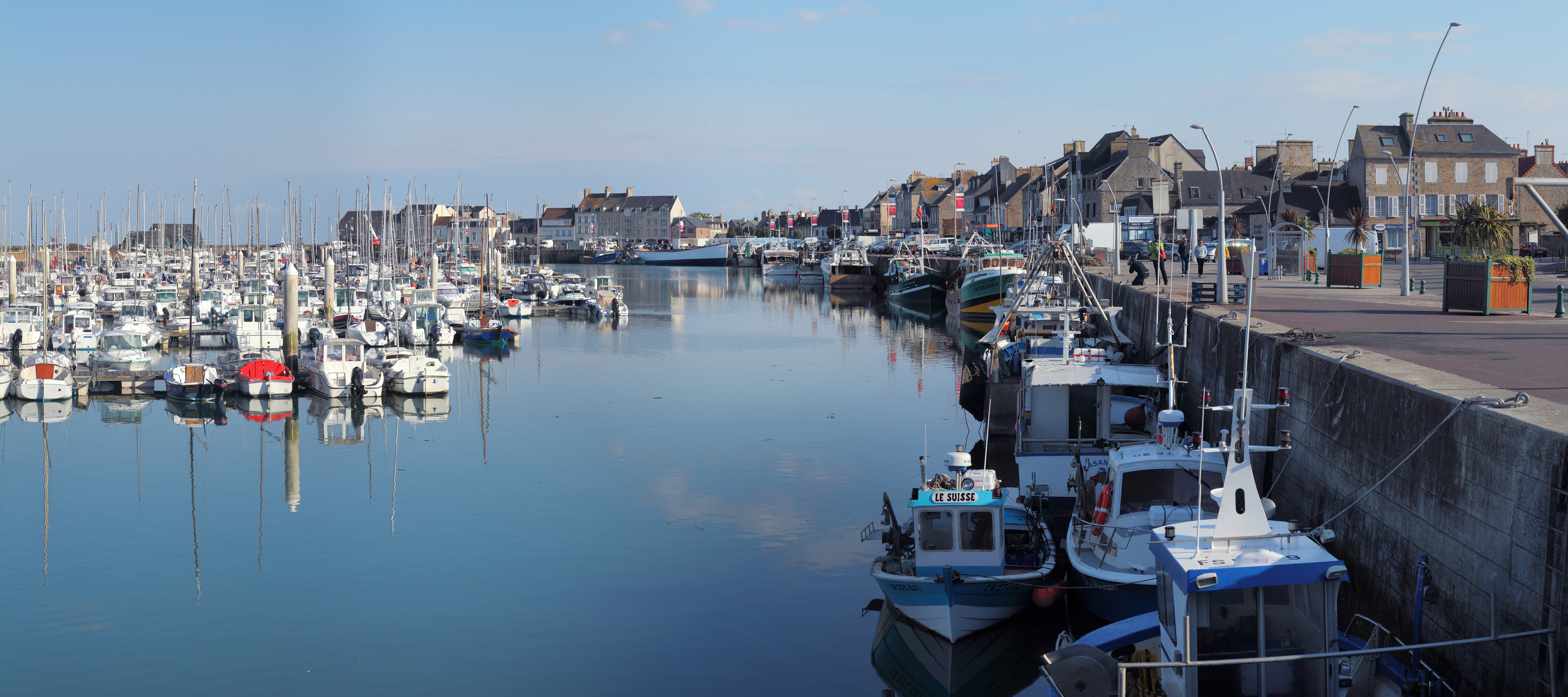
- The harbour at Saint-Vaast-la-Hougue
- Location of Saint-Vaast-la-Hougue
- Location within France Location within Normandy
- Coordinates: 49°35′19″N 1°15′58″W
- Country: France
- Region: Normandy
- Department: Manche
- Arrondissement: Cherbourg
- Canton: Val-de-Saire
- Intercommunality: CA Cotentin

Government
  - Mayor (2020–2026): Gilbert Doucet
- Area^{1}: 6.28 km^{2} (2.42 sq mi)
- Elevation: 3 m (9.8 ft)
- Population (2023): 1,648
  - Density: 262/km^{2} (680/sq mi)
- Time zone: UTC+01:00 (CET)
  - Summer (DST): UTC+02:00 (CEST)
- INSEE/Postal code: 50562 /50550
- ^{1} French Land Register data, which excludes lakes, ponds, glaciers > 1 km^{2} (0.386 sq mi or 247 acres) and river estuaries.

Saint-Vaast-la-Hougue (French pronunciation: [sɛ̃ va la uɡ]) is a commune in the Manche department in Normandy in north-western France.

It is particularly known for being a major site of fortifications designed by Sébastien Le Prestre de Vauban: the watchtowers of Tatihou and La Hougue having been listed in 2008 as part of the Fortifications of Vauban UNESCO World Heritage Sites.

Saint-Vaast-la-Hougue was awarded "2 flowers" by the concours des villes et villages fleuris contest and the town was elected "favourite French village 2019" in a television programme broadcast on France 3 in 2019.

== Toponymy ==
Saint-Vaast is the Norman name of Saint Vedast and Hougue is a Norman language word meaning a "mound" or "loaf" and comes from the Old Norse word haugr.

== Geography ==
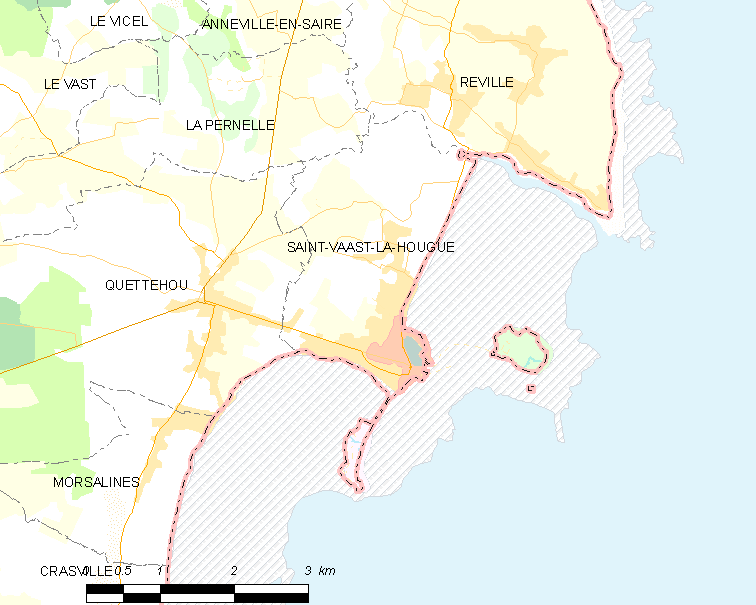
Map of Saint-Vaast-la-Hougue

Saint-Vaast-la-Hougue is part of the canton of Val-de-Saire and the arrondissement of Cherbourg. As of 2023, the population of the commune was 1,648. It is located on the north east coast of the Cotentin peninsula and home to a marina. The town is crossed by the Saire.

The island of Tatihou is located about 1 kilometre (0.62 mi) from the coast, and forms part of the commune. It is usually reached by amphibious craft although, being a tidal island, it is also possible to walk there over at low tide. Just like the large trawlers moored at the port, the oyster beds visible at low tide between Tatihou and the coast testify to the predominance of maritime activity in Saint-Vaast, which is the oldest oyster basin in Normandy.

Saint-Vaast-la-Hougue is one of 303 French municipalities identified as seriously threatened by rising water levels, due to global warming.

== History ==
=== Prehistory ===
Excavations, led by Gérard Fosse (1948-2019), revealed human occupation dating from the Mousterian period on the site of the Fort of Saint-Vaast-la-Hougue. As early as 1832, A. Bigot demonstrated the ancient occupation of Saint-Vaast with the discovery of a flint tool at La Hougue. On the island of Tatihou, traces of ancient bronze was discovered at Clos du Lazaret.

=== Middle Ages ===
The village, before being called Saint-Vaast, only included a few homes built around a church near to what would later be called Porte-aux-dames.

Around the year 1000, near Saint-Vaast-la-Hougue, Néel I of Saint-Sauveur, a Norman baron of the House of Saint-Sauveur (fr), repelled an Anglo-Saxon landing led by Æthelred the Unready. The Anglo-Saxon invasion failed thanks to the efforts of Saint-Sauveur who defeated the invaders at the battle of Val-de-Saire. William of Jumièges explains that this landing aimed to capture Richard II, Duke of Normandy. The historian François Neveux expresses some doubts concerning this assertion, noting the distance of Rouen from the battlefield. For him, it was just a pillaging raid in retaliation for Viking expeditions in the Anglo-Saxon kingdom.

The medieval parish, fiefdom of Fécamp Abbey, is under the patronage of Saint Vaast, who never came to Normandy; it was in French Flanders that he exercised his priesthood, as bishop of Arras. It was probably during the construction in the 11th century of the first church, the current Sailors' Chapel, that the monks of Fécamp Abbey chose Saint Vaast as their patron. For Éric Barré, the dedication of the church of La Hougue to Saint Vaast, and by extension the name of the parish, would be the result of the meeting of the fishermen of the place with the fishermen of Artois and Picardy in the Baie de Seine. According to local tradition, the region was evangelized by Vaast d'Arras, bishop of Arras and Saint Vigor, bishop of Bayeux in the 6th century. While they were going towards what would become Quettehou, the bishops had to cross La Bonde on a wooden plank which gave way to the passage of Saint Vaast. La Bonde still serves as a boundary between the two parishes.

In 1296, during the Gascon War, Saint-Vaast provided 12 warships.

In 1340, during the Battle of Sluys, many of La Hougue's carracks were sunk: the Saint-Jehan, the Saint-Jame, the Nostre-Dame, the Saint-Esperit, the Jehannète, the Pélerine, the Mignolète, and the Sainte-Marie.

As part of the Hundred Years' War, Edward III of England in 1346 launched a series of raids throughout northern France known as the Crécy campaign. Edward requisitioned the largest fleet assembled by the English to that date, 747 ships, and on 11 July set sail from the Isle of Wight, making landfall at Saint-Vaast-la-Hougue, on 12 July. On 9 July five hundred guards, probably Genoese archers hired by the king of France, had spent ten weeks guarding the outskirts of Saint-Vaast, but having not received their pay had all left.

In June 1356, it was also at La Hougue that Henry of Grosmont, Duke of Lancaster landed before attacking Normandy and in 1357, an English garrison commanded by Robert de Ewes also settled in La Hougue.

=== Modern era ===
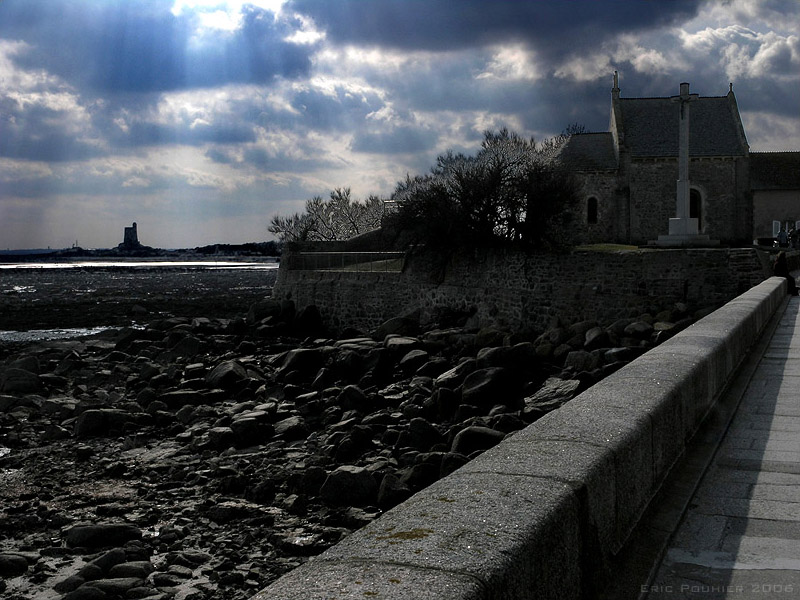
Fort de La Hougue

The naval Battle of La Hougue took place off the town in 1692. On 3 June 1692 during a heated battle with the Anglo-Dutch fleet, twelve French ships were sunk in the vicinity of the island of Tatihou, just off the coast of Saint-Vaast-la-Hougue. It was the decisive naval battle of the Nine Years' War, also known as the War of the English Succession.

Following the French defeat, two fortified towers were built from 1694 onwards on the mound at La Hougue and Tatihou Island by a student of Vauban, Benjamin de Combes, in order to defend the bay. The towers were inscribed on the UNESCO World Heritage List in 2008 as part of the Fortifications of Vauban site for their testimony to Vauban's work and its importance in the development of military architecture from the 17th through the 19th centuries.

A French frigate squadron anchored at Saint-Vaast-la-Hougue was attacked by a British squadron at the action of 15 November 1810, which ultimately led to the destruction of the French ship French frigate Elisa.

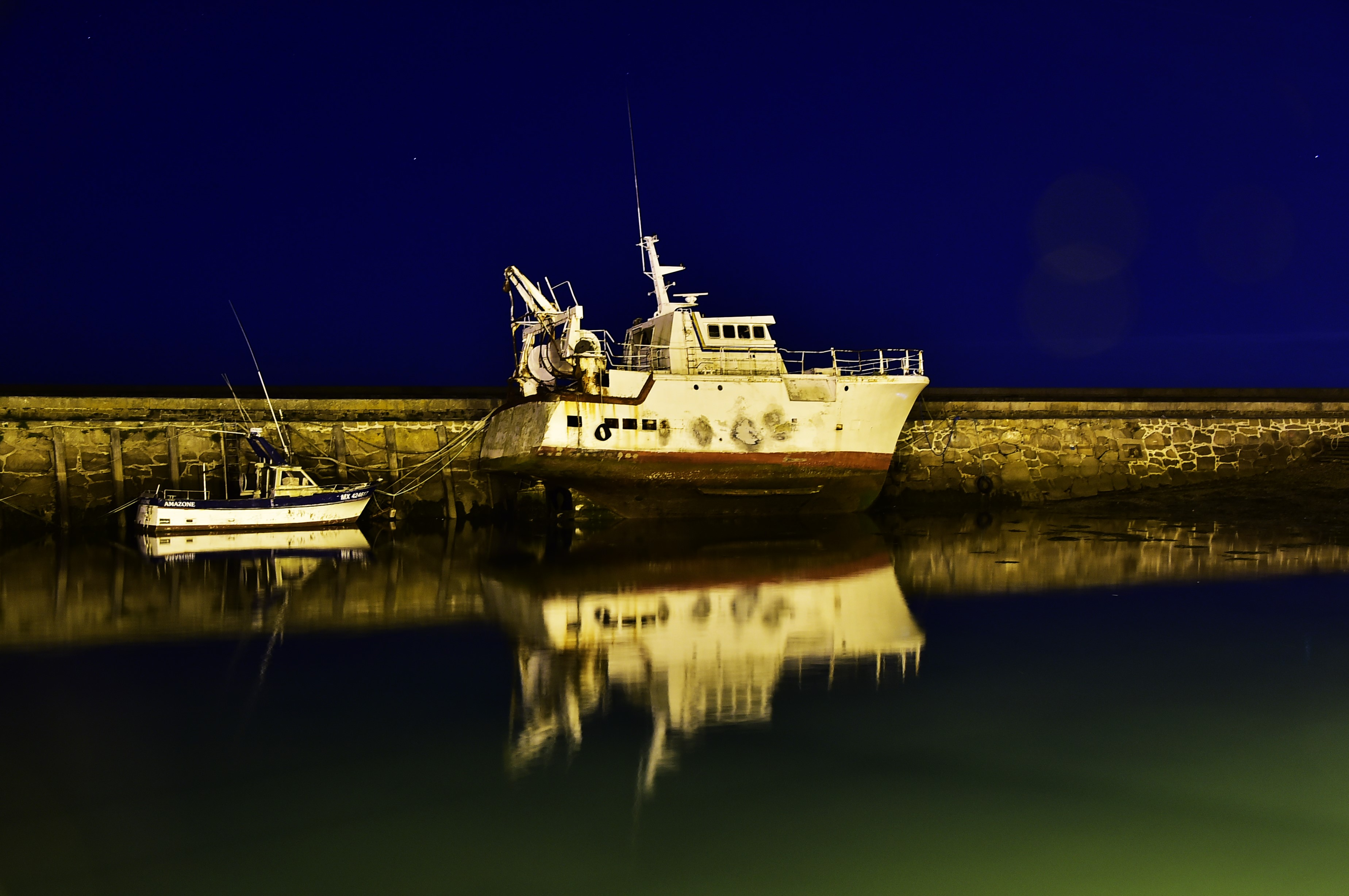
The port at night

=== Contemporary era ===
Fortification work continued until the 19th century, when the port of Saint-Vaast-la-Hougue was developed by the civil engineer Charles-Félix Morice de la Rue (1800-1880). The large pier was built from 1828 to 1845 then the quays from 1846 to 1852. Breakwaters were then added to delimit the port. Before this period, Saint-Vaast only had a natural beaching port to the west of Pointe de la Hougue, which was still used in the 19th century.

Shortly after the Normandy landings with the Allied troops rapidly advancing the Germans left Saint-Vaast-la-Hougue on 18 June 1944 by setting fire to the barracks of Tatihou Island and destroyed the lines of the PTT telephone exchange. On 21 June 1944, the port of Saint-Vaast-la-Hougue was the first Channel port liberated by the Allies and for the next 100 days the port would experience very high traffic; the nearby port of Cherbourg having not been liberated until 28 June, but took over a month to become serviceable due to German damage.

=== A medieval whaling economy ===
Saint-Vaast-la-Hougue was a very active whaling center, as there was a dense population of the then common gray whale (which is now extinct in the Atlantic). The now rare right whale was likely also taken. The first of what may prove to be many more gray whales found its way through the now ice-free Northwest Passage in 2010 so perhaps they will eventually breed off Saint-Vaast-la-Hougue once more.

== Culture ==
Saint-Vaast-la-Hougue organizes a regular Book Festival, "Ancres & Encres". Jean Raspail and Jean-Pierre Thiollet may be mentioned among the authors invited in the last ten years.

== Notable people ==
- François Durand (1796-1848), French politician, mayor of Caen and deputy for Calvados, was born there;
- François Roulland (1817-1875), French physician and politician, mayor of Caen from 1870 to 1875, was born there;
- Louis Lacombe (1818-1884), pianist and composer, died there;
- Eugène Boudin (1824-1898), Norman painter. He painted about thirty canvases between 1879 and 1883, including Port de Saint-Vaast, La Hougue, and Tatihou.

== Twin towns ==
- Bridport in the United Kingdom

== See also ==
- Communes of the Manche department
