= Réthoville =

- Part of Vicq-sur-Mer
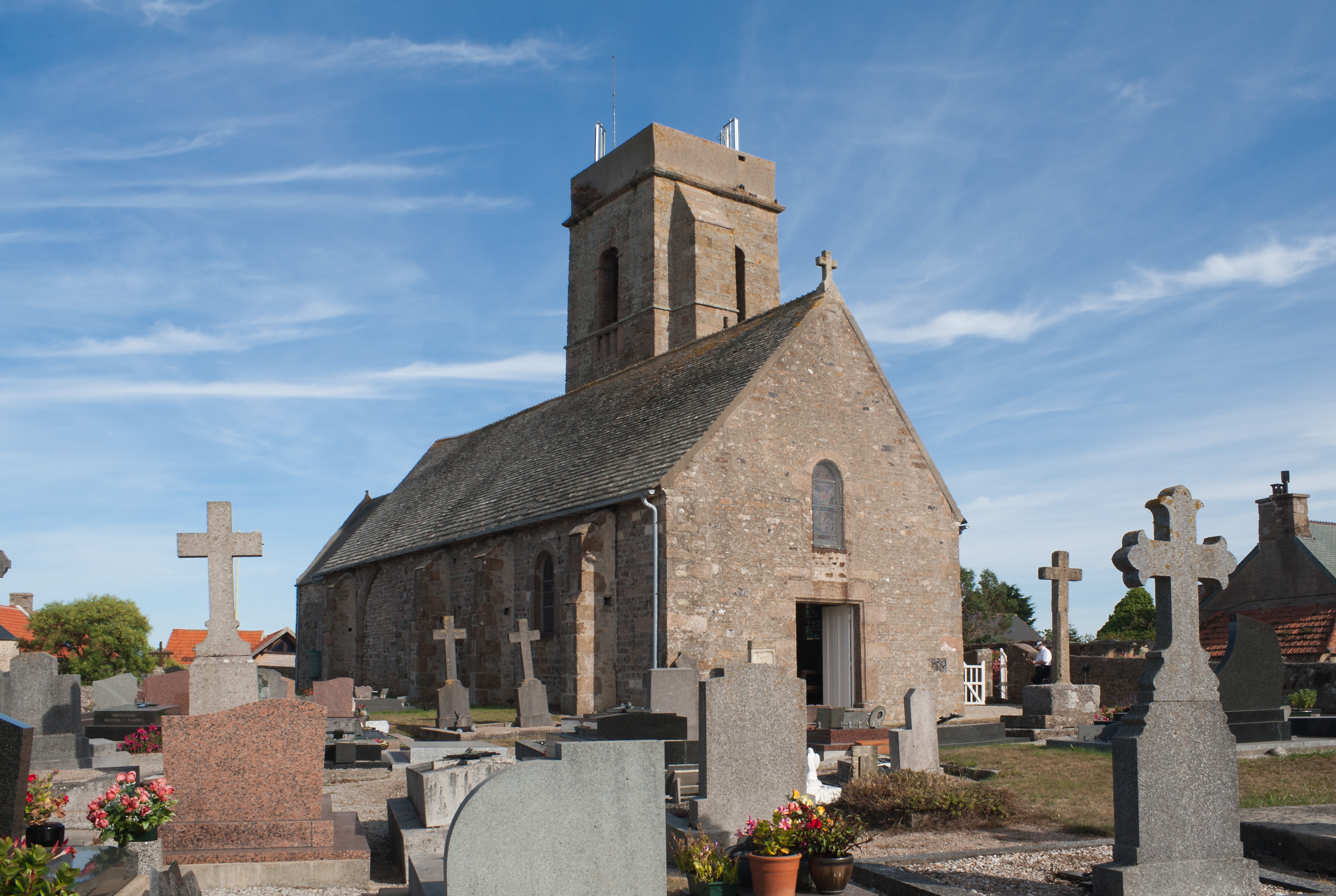
- The church of Saint-Martin
- Location of Réthoville
- Location within France Location within Normandy
- Coordinates: 49°41′50″N 1°21′23″W
- Country: France
- Region: Normandy
- Department: Manche
- Arrondissement: Cherbourg
- Canton: Val-de-Saire
- Commune: Vicq-sur-Mer
- Area^{1}: 3.43 km^{2} (1.32 sq mi)
- Elevation: 27 m (89 ft)
- Highest elevation: 45 m (148 ft)
- Lowest elevation: 0 m (0 ft)
- Population (2018): 132
  - Density: 38.5/km^{2} (99.7/sq mi)
- Time zone: UTC+01:00 (CET)
  - Summer (DST): UTC+02:00 (CEST)
- Postal code: 50330
- ^{1} French Land Register data, which excludes lakes, ponds, glaciers > 1 km^{2} (0.386 sq mi or 247 acres) and river estuaries.

Réthoville (French pronunciation: [ʁetɔvil]) is a former commune in the Manche department in Normandy in north-western France. On 1 January 2016, it was merged into the new commune of Vicq-sur-Mer. Its population was 132 in 2018.

== Demographics ==
Historical population
Year	Pop.	±% p.a.
1968	100	—
1975	96	−0.58%
1982	92	−0.61%
1990	128	+4.21%
1999	124	−0.35%
2007	133	+0.88%
2012	127	−0.92%
2018	132	+0.65%
Source: EHESS and INSEE

== Geography ==
The area of Réthoville is 3.43 km^{2}. The altitude ranges between 0 and 45 meter AMSL. To the north of Réthoville is the English Channel, to the south is the commune Varouville. To the east of Réthoville is the former commune of Néville-sur-Mer, and to the west is the former commune of Cosqueville.

== Climate ==
In the winter months Réthoville has an average high of about 8 °C and an average low of about 4 °C. The spring months have an average high of about 12 °C with a low of 7 °C. The summer months have an average high of 19 °C and an average low of 13 °C. The fall months have a high of 15 °C and an average low of 10 °C. The yearly rain fall of Réthoville is about 435 mm. The monthly rain fall averages about 36 mm. The winter months have an average of 50.9 mm of rain fall. The spring months have an average rain fall of about 27.2 mm. The summer months have an average rain fall of about 21.8 mm. The fall months have an average rain fall of about 45.2 mm.

== Historical places ==
- Moulin de Marie Ravenel, an 18th century water mill that was purchased in 1999 by the Communauté de Communes du canton de Saint-Pierre-Eglise.

== See also ==
- Communes of the Manche department
