= Gilles de Gouberville =

French diarist (1521-1578)

Gouberville, Gilles de
- Born: Gilles Picot; 1521
- Died: March 1578 (aged 56–57); Le Mesnil-au-Val, France
- Resting place: Le Mesnil-au-Val church, Normandy, France
- Occupations: Lieutenant des Eaux et Forêts (watercourses and forests)
- Employer: French King
- Known for: Diary
- Title: squire of Gouberville, Le Mesnil-au-Val and Russy
- Predecessor: Guillaume V Picot
- Parent(s): Guillaume V Picot, squire of Gouberville, and Jeanne du Fou, daughter of Guillaume du Fou
- Website: www.gouberville.asso.fr

Gilles Picot, squire of Gouberville, Le Mesnil-au-Val and Russy (1521 – 7 March 1578), was a French diarist.

== Biography ==
Gilles Picot, a Norman squire, member of the local but ancient gentry, was the eldest son of Guillaume V Picot, squire de Gouberville, and Jeanne du Fou, daughter of Guillaume du Fou, squire of Barville, and Mesnil-au-Val and captain of the château in Cherbourg. Lord of the manor in Mesnil-au-Val, Gilles succeeded his father as “lieutenant des Eaux et Forêts” (in charge of watercourses and forests) for the viscounty of Valognes in 1543. In 1544, he inherited the manors of Gouberville and Mesnil-au-Val from his father and in 1560 the manor of Russy from his uncle Jean Picot, a cleric.

He is the author of a diary or accounts book (livre de raison) of which only the years from 1549 to 1562 have come down to us; the original manuscript was found in the archives of the château in Saint-Pierre-Église. This Journal written in Middle French (republished in 4 volumes by the Éditions des champs, 1993-1994) is a firsthand report of the life of a country squire in the Northern part of the Cotentin during the 16th century.

When he began writing his journal, the squire of Gouberville was about 30 years old. He was in the prime of his life, well-trained, and skilled in swordsmanship. He could shoot with a crossbow and with a musket. Competent at games of skill and strength, he enjoyed jousting with his friends. When necessary, he was also quite versed in using farm implements and driving heavy loads. An educated man, he could read in Latin and used the Greek alphabet to transcribe sentences in French when he wanted to keep some information secret.

His methodical and orderly mind, such as it appears in his Livre de raison, reveals the common sense that he demonstrated in every occasion. However, the most distinctive features of this young squire are his compassion and his moral values which make him so endearing. On 1 September 1554, in his Journal, he mentioned the practice of distilling cider to make apple brandy, the first reference to the spirits known today as Calvados.

He is buried somewhere in the church in Le Mesnil-au-Val, the exact location is unknown. Since 1986, an association called the Comité Gilles de Gouberville has been busy providing information about the Norman squire, organizing lectures and visits, and publishing annually Les Cahiers goubervilliens since September 1997. Twitter publishes a daily tweet from the Journal, using an entry from the same day 458 years ago.

== Works ==
- Journal de Gilles de Gouberville, éd. Archives départementales de la Manche, Saint-Lô, 2020, vol. 1, 2 et 3, (ISBN 978-2-86050-040-1, 978-2-86050-041-8 et 978-2-86050-042-5).
- Le Journal du sire de Gouberville, Éd. Guy Deschamps, Bricqueboscq, Éditions des champs, 1993, vol. 1, 2-3 et 4, (ISBN 978-2-91013-801-1, 978-2-91013-802-8 and 978-2-91013-802-8).
