= Russy =

Russy may refer to the following places:

== In France ==
- Russy, Calvados, in the Calvados département
- Russy-Bémont, in the Oise département

== In Switzerland ==
- Russy, Switzerland, in the Canton of Fribourg
