= Octeville =

Octeville may refer to one of the following places in Normandy, France:

- Octeville, Manche, part of the reorganized port city Cherbourg-Octeville
- Octeville-l'Avenel, Manche
- Octeville-sur-Mer, Seine-Maritime
