= Aure sur Mer =

- Commune
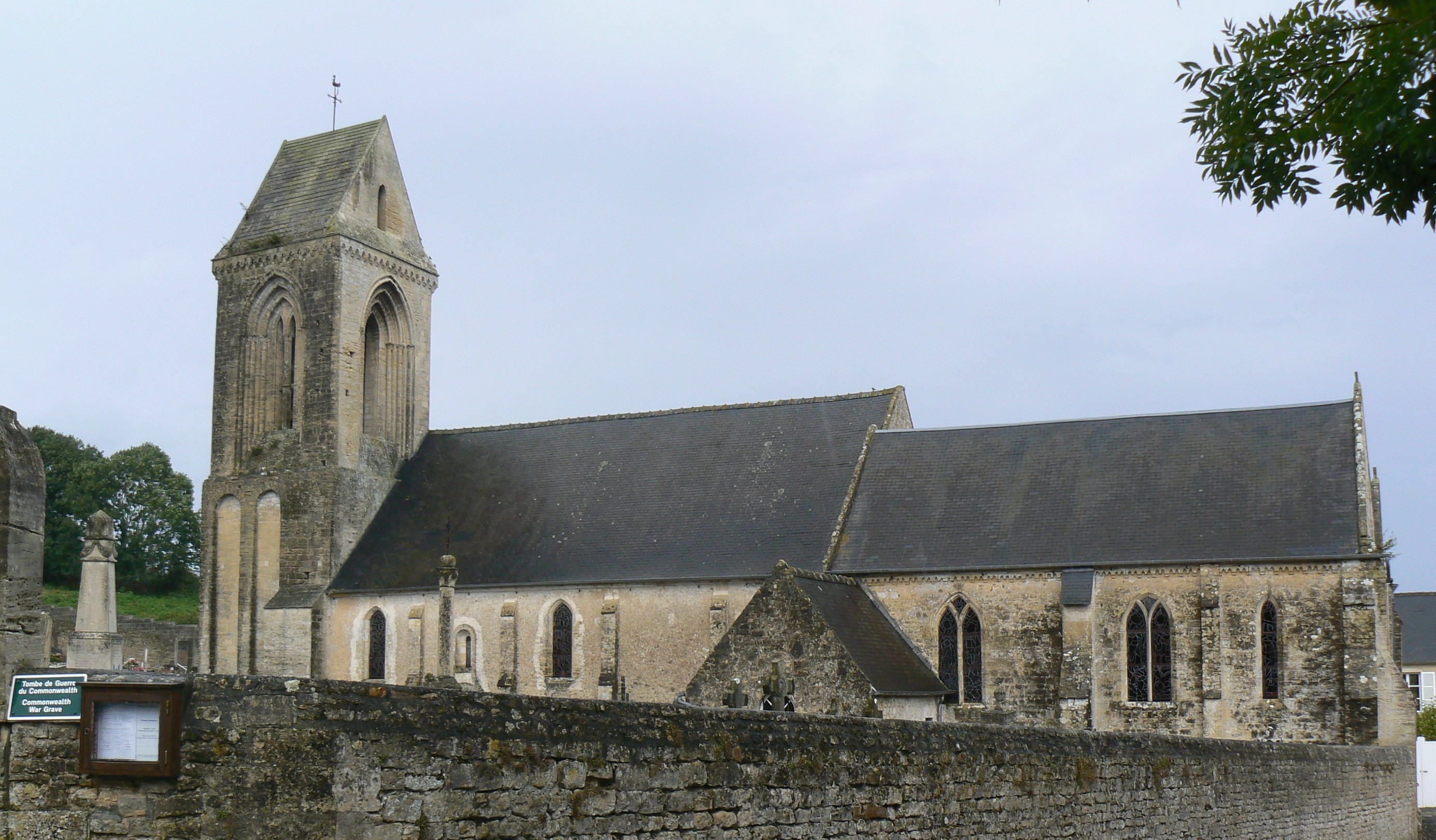
- The church in Sainte-Honorine-des-Pertes
- Location of Aure sur Mer
- Location within France Location within Normandy
- Coordinates: 49°20′49″N 0°48′25″W
- Country: France
- Region: Normandy
- Department: Calvados
- Arrondissement: Bayeux
- Canton: Trévières
- Intercommunality: CC Isigny-Omaha Intercom

Government
  - Mayor (2020–2026): Alain Bauda
- Area^{1}: 10.55 km^{2} (4.07 sq mi)
- Population (2023): 692
  - Density: 65.6/km^{2} (170/sq mi)
- Time zone: UTC+01:00 (CET)
  - Summer (DST): UTC+02:00 (CEST)
- INSEE/Postal code: 14591 /14520, 14710
- ^{1} French Land Register data, which excludes lakes, ponds, glaciers > 1 km^{2} (0.386 sq mi or 247 acres) and river estuaries.

Aure sur Mer (French pronunciation: [ɔʁ syʁ mɛʁ], literally Aure on Sea) is a commune in the department of Calvados, northwestern France. The municipality was established on 1 January 2017 by merger of the former communes of Sainte-Honorine-des-Pertes (the seat) and Russy.

== See also ==
- Communes of the Calvados department
