= Montfarville =

- Commune
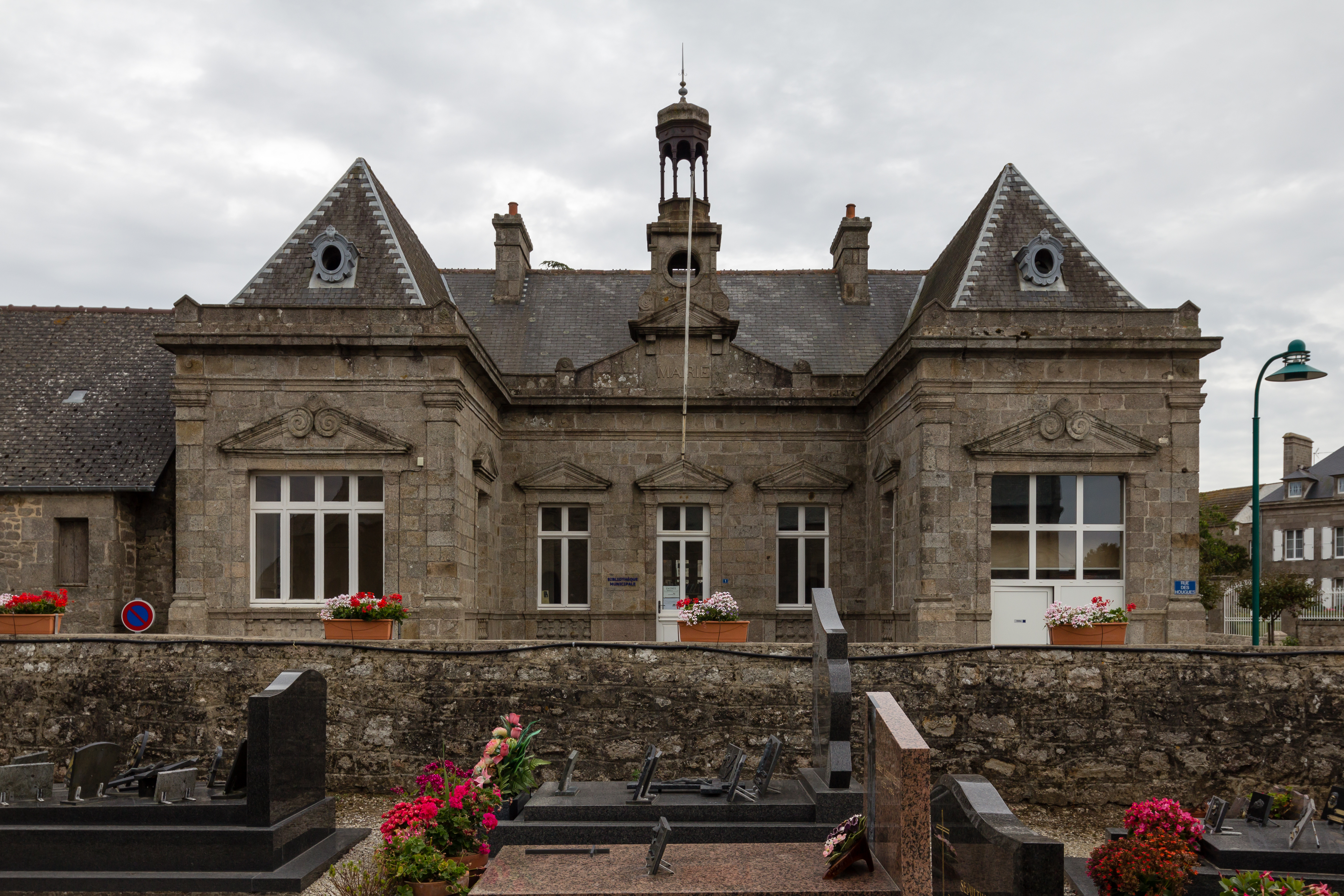
- The old town hall, now the municipal library
- Location of Montfarville
- Location within France Location within Normandy
- Coordinates: 49°39′19″N 1°16′07″W
- Country: France
- Region: Normandy
- Department: Manche
- Arrondissement: Cherbourg
- Canton: Val-de-Saire
- Intercommunality: CA Cotentin

Government
  - Mayor (2021–2026): Jean-Marie Rocques
- Area^{1}: 5.40 km^{2} (2.08 sq mi)
- Elevation: 20 m (66 ft)
- Highest elevation: 28 m (92 ft)
- Lowest elevation: 0 m (0 ft)
- Population (2023): 798
  - Density: 148/km^{2} (383/sq mi)
- Demonym: Monfarvillais
- Time zone: UTC+01:00 (CET)
  - Summer (DST): UTC+02:00 (CEST)
- INSEE/Postal code: 50342 /50760
- ^{1} French Land Register data, which excludes lakes, ponds, glaciers > 1 km^{2} (0.386 sq mi or 247 acres) and river estuaries.

Montfarville (French pronunciation: [mɔ̃faʁvil]) is a commune in the Manche department in Normandy in north-western France.

== See also ==
- Communes of the Manche department
