= Carneville =

- Commune
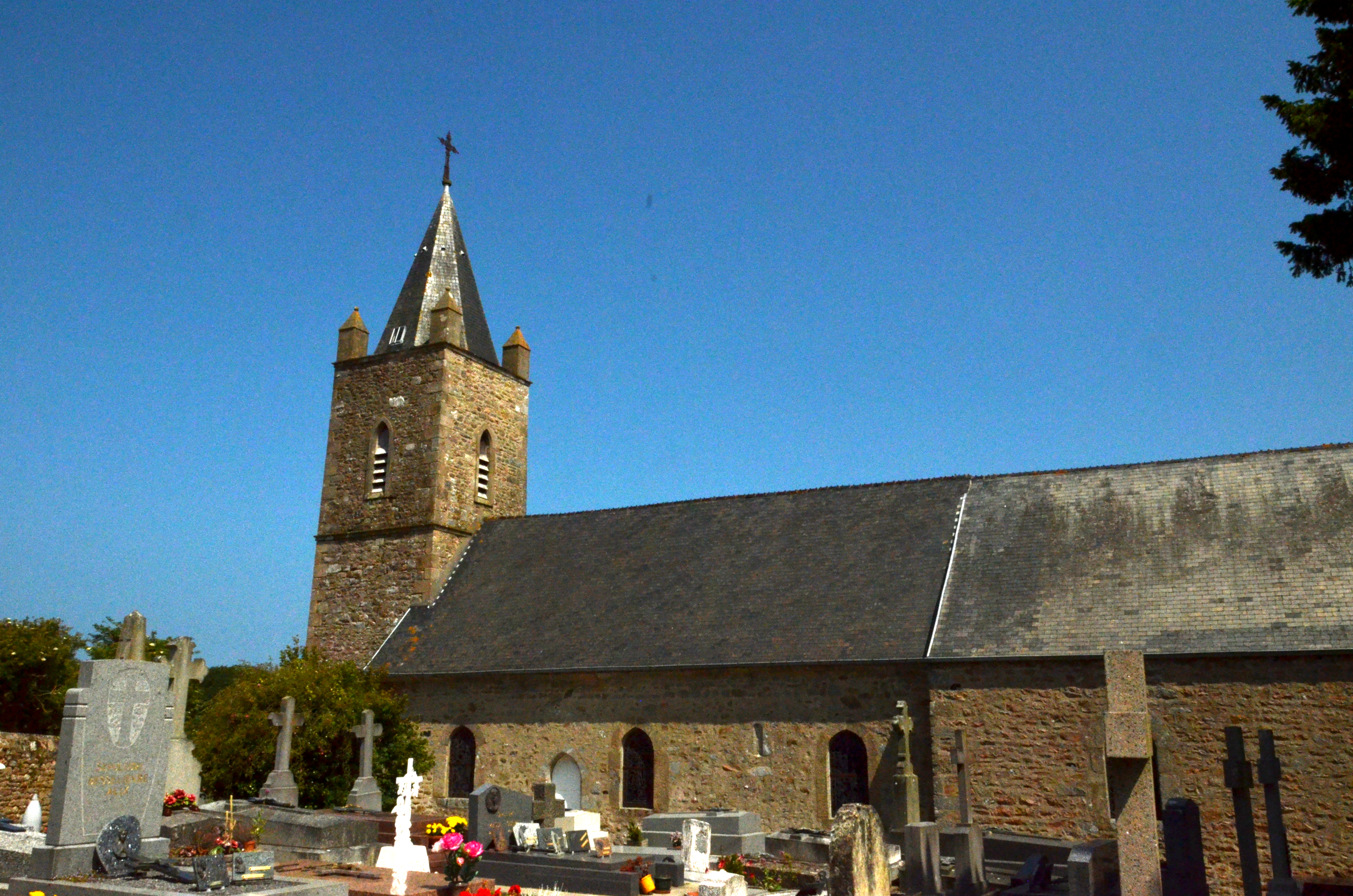
- The church of Saint-Malo
- Location of Carneville
- Location within France Location within Normandy
- Coordinates: 49°39′52″N 1°26′41″W
- Country: France
- Region: Normandy
- Department: Manche
- Arrondissement: Cherbourg
- Canton: Val-de-Saire
- Intercommunality: CA Cotentin

Government
  - Mayor (2020–2026): Francis Le Danois
- Area^{1}: 6.88 km^{2} (2.66 sq mi)
- Elevation: 80 m (260 ft)
- Highest elevation: 139 m (456 ft)
- Lowest elevation: 30 m (98 ft)
- Population (2023): 240
  - Density: 35/km^{2} (90/sq mi)
- Time zone: UTC+01:00 (CET)
  - Summer (DST): UTC+02:00 (CEST)
- INSEE/Postal code: 50101 /50330
- ^{1} French Land Register data, which excludes lakes, ponds, glaciers > 1 km^{2} (0.386 sq mi or 247 acres) and river estuaries.

Carneville (French pronunciation: [kaʁnəvil]) is a commune in the Manche department in Normandy in north-western France.

== See also ==
- Communes of the Manche department
