= Cosqueville =

- Part of Vicq-sur-Mer
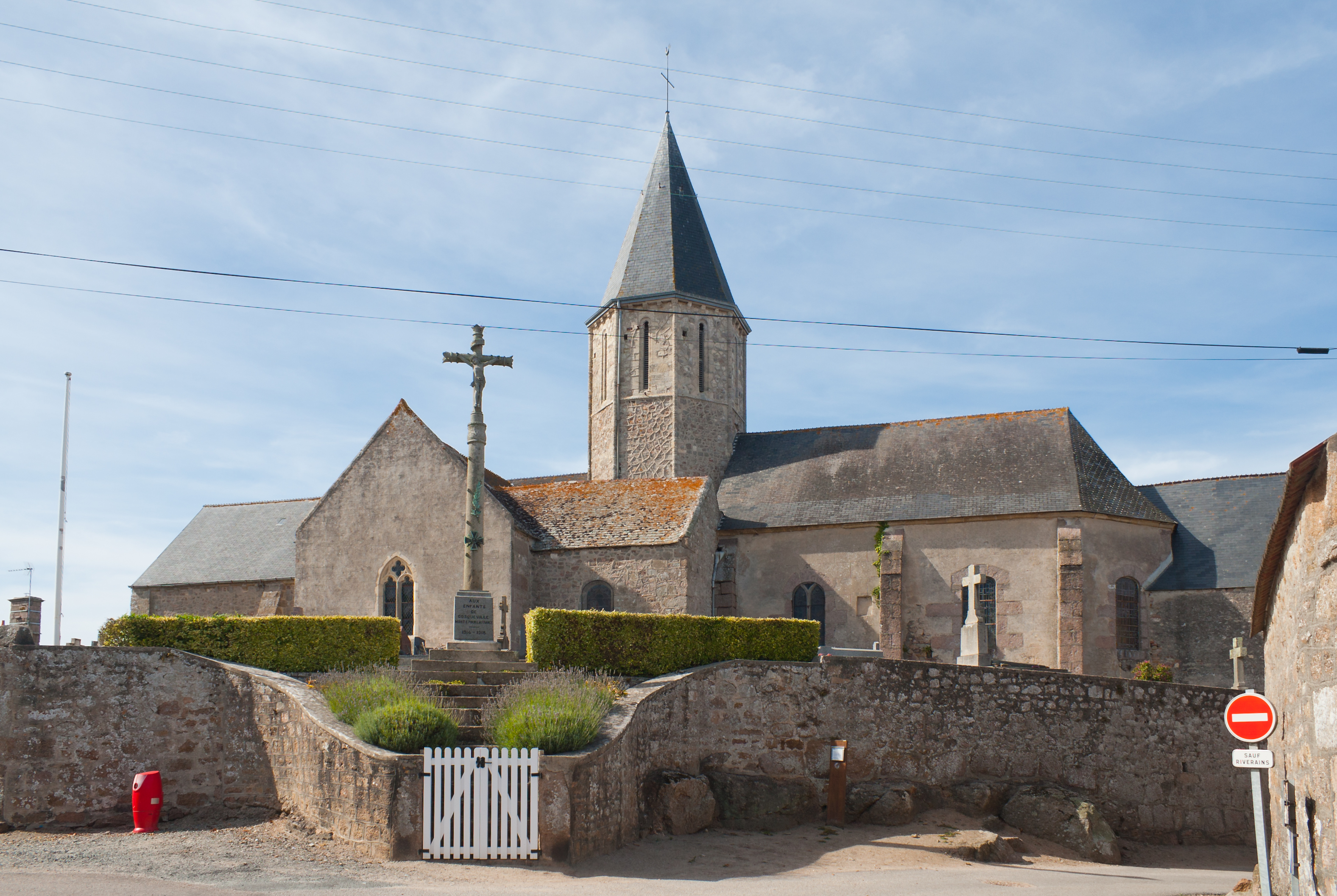
- 12th-century parish church with a 15th-century tower, dedicated to Our Lady and Saint Marcouf
- Location of Cosqueville
- Location within France Location within Normandy
- Coordinates: 49°41′42″N 1°24′27″W
- Country: France
- Region: Normandy
- Department: Manche
- Arrondissement: Cherbourg
- Canton: Val-de-Saire
- Commune: Vicq-sur-Mer
- Area^{1}: 10.90 km^{2} (4.21 sq mi)
- Elevation: 10 m (33 ft)
- Highest elevation: 85 m (279 ft)
- Lowest elevation: 0 m (0 ft)
- Population (2018): 591
  - Density: 54.2/km^{2} (140/sq mi)
- Time zone: UTC+01:00 (CET)
  - Summer (DST): UTC+02:00 (CEST)
- Postal code: 50330
- ^{1} French Land Register data, which excludes lakes, ponds, glaciers > 1 km^{2} (0.386 sq mi or 247 acres) and river estuaries.

Cosqueville (French pronunciation: [kokvil]) is a former commune in the Manche department in Normandy in north-western France. On 1 January 2016, it was merged into the new commune of Vicq-sur-Mer.

== See also ==
- Communes of the Manche department
