= Néville-sur-Mer =

- Part of Vicq-sur-Mer
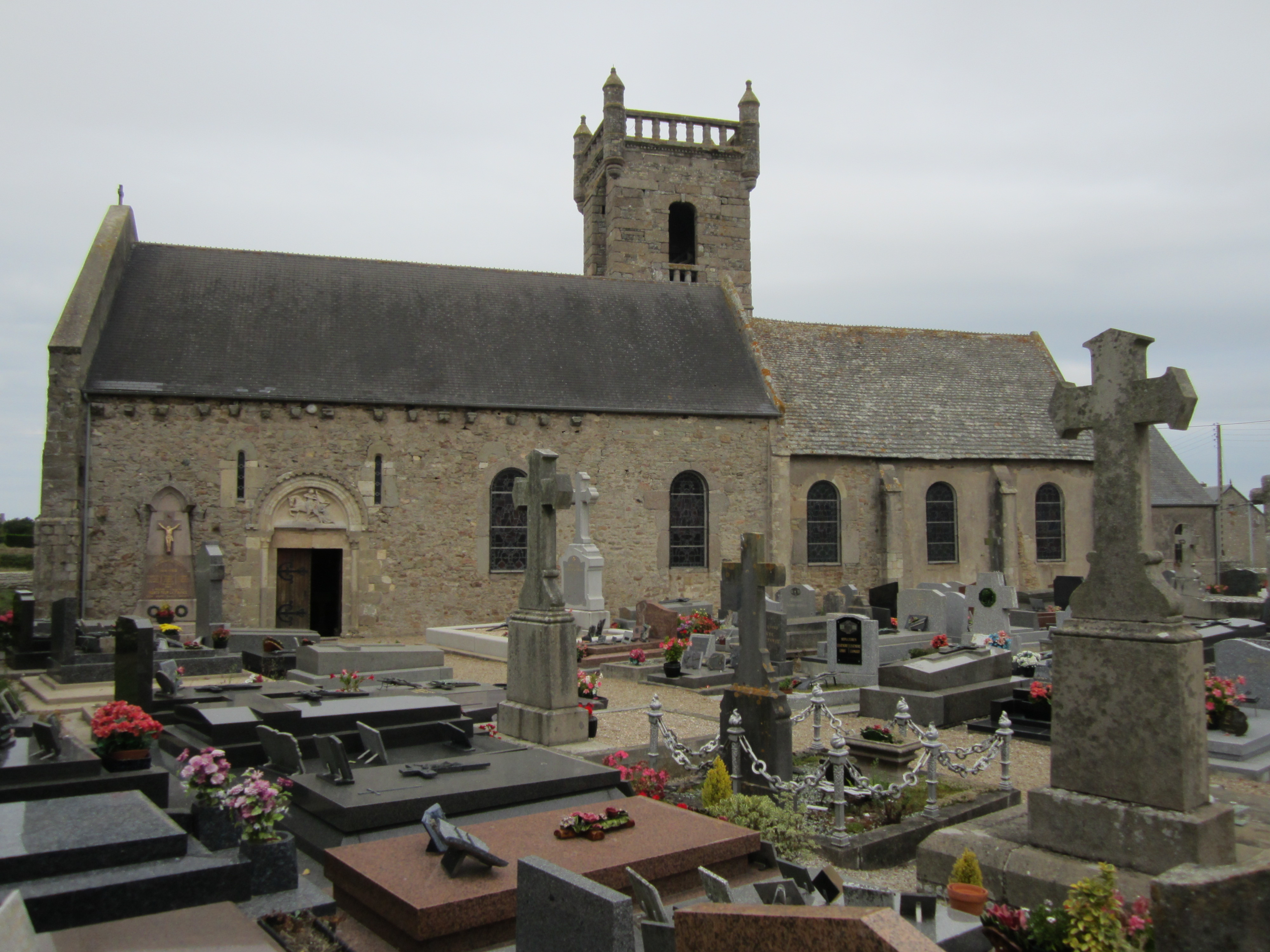
- The church of Saint-Martin-et-Sainte-Trinité
- Location of Néville-sur-Mer
- Location within France Location within Normandy
- Coordinates: 49°41′32″N 1°20′12″W
- Country: France
- Region: Normandy
- Department: Manche
- Arrondissement: Cherbourg
- Canton: Val-de-Saire
- Commune: Vicq-sur-Mer
- Area^{1}: 3.46 km^{2} (1.34 sq mi)
- Elevation: 14 m (46 ft)
- Highest elevation: 52 m (171 ft)
- Lowest elevation: 0 m (0 ft)
- Population (2018): 194
  - Density: 56.1/km^{2} (145/sq mi)
- Time zone: UTC+01:00 (CET)
  - Summer (DST): UTC+02:00 (CEST)
- Postal code: 50330
- ^{1} French Land Register data, which excludes lakes, ponds, glaciers > 1 km^{2} (0.386 sq mi or 247 acres) and river estuaries.

Néville-sur-Mer (French pronunciation: [nevil syʁ mɛʁ], literally Néville on Sea) is a former commune in the Manche department in Normandy in northwestern France. On 1 January 2016, it was merged into the new commune of Vicq-sur-Mer.

== See also ==
- Communes of the Manche department
