= Gouberville =

- Part of Vicq-sur-Mer
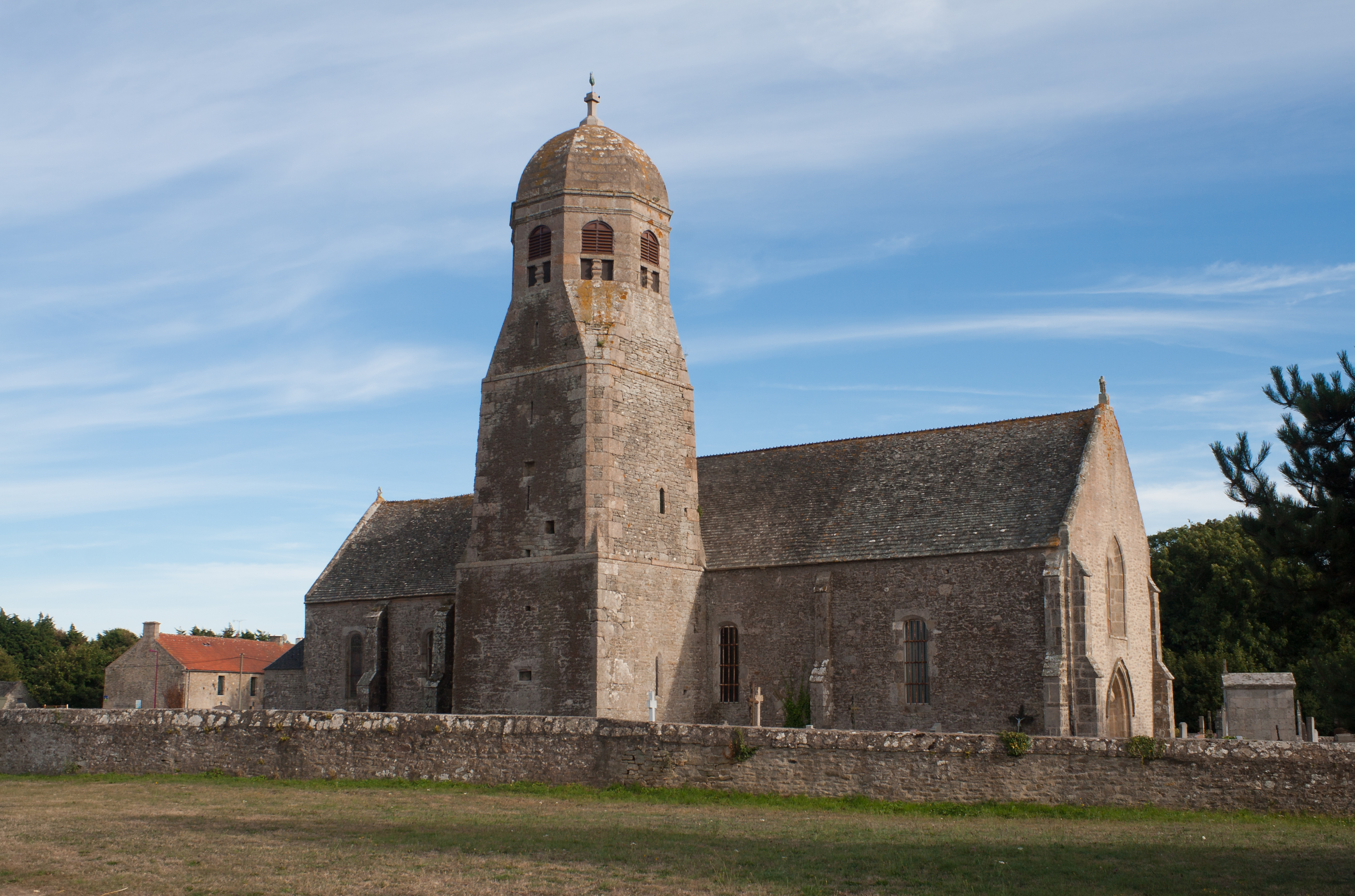
- The church of Notre-Dame
- Location of Gouberville
- Location within France Location within Normandy
- Coordinates: 49°41′14″N 1°18′55″W
- Country: France
- Region: Normandy
- Department: Manche
- Arrondissement: Cherbourg
- Canton: Val-de-Saire
- Commune: Vicq-sur-Mer
- Area^{1}: 2.79 km^{2} (1.08 sq mi)
- Elevation: 16 m (52 ft)
- Highest elevation: 38 m (125 ft)
- Lowest elevation: 0 m (0 ft)
- Population (2018): 121
  - Density: 43.4/km^{2} (112/sq mi)
- Time zone: UTC+01:00 (CET)
  - Summer (DST): UTC+02:00 (CEST)
- Postal code: 50330
- ^{1} French Land Register data, which excludes lakes, ponds, glaciers > 1 km^{2} (0.386 sq mi or 247 acres) and river estuaries.

Gouberville (French pronunciation: [ɡubɛʁvil]) is a former commune in the Manche department in north-western France. On 1 January 2016, it was merged into the new commune of Vicq-sur-Mer.

== See also ==
- Communes of the Manche department
