= La Pernelle =

- Commune
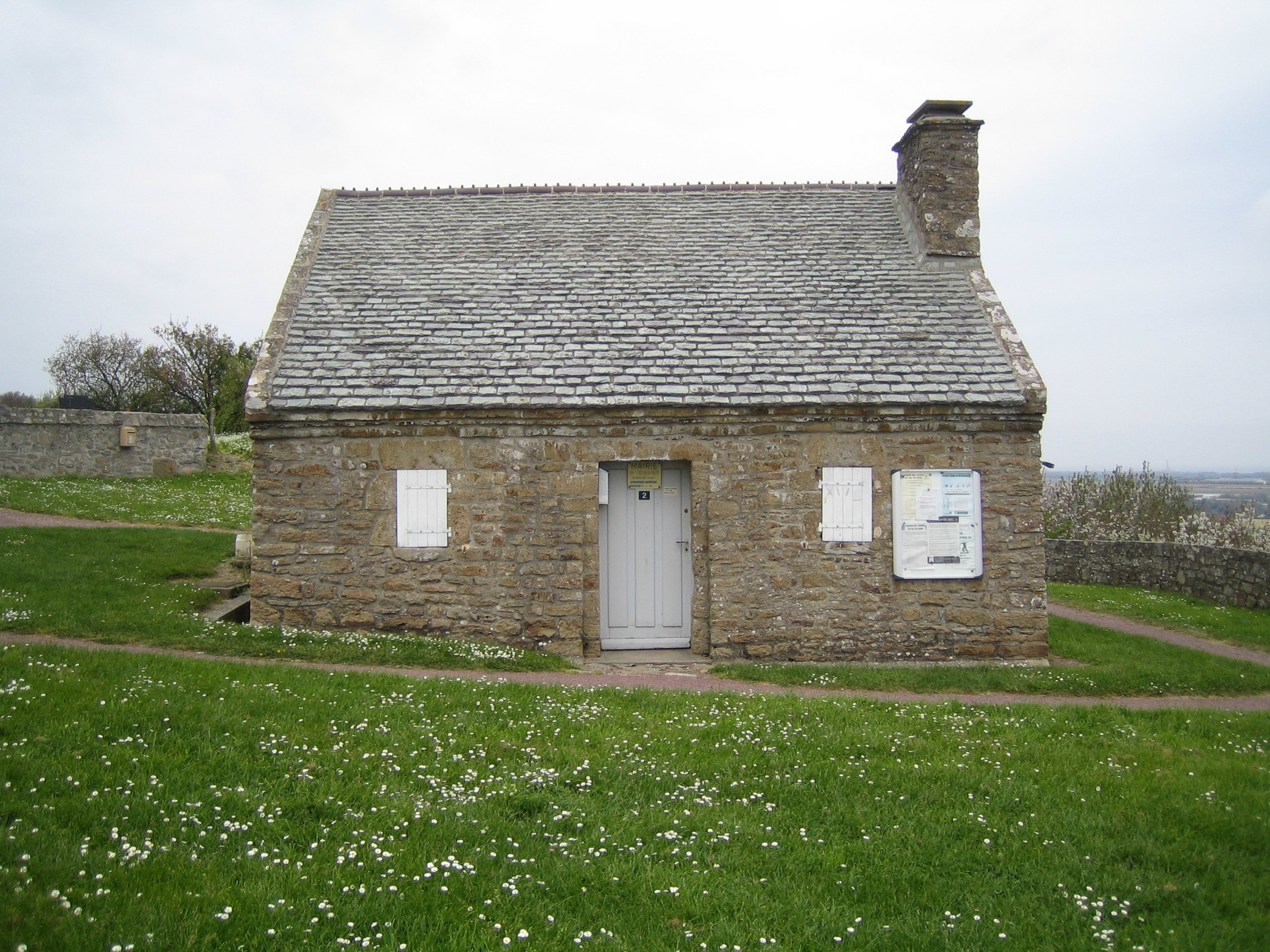
- Town hall and former guardhouse
- Location of La Pernelle
- Location within France Location within Normandy
- Coordinates: 49°37′14″N 1°17′51″W
- Country: France
- Region: Normandy
- Department: Manche
- Arrondissement: Cherbourg
- Canton: Val-de-Saire
- Intercommunality: CA Cotentin

Government
  - Mayor (2020–2026): Nicole Branthomme
- Area^{1}: 7.23 km^{2} (2.79 sq mi)
- Elevation: 112 m (367 ft)
- Highest elevation: 121 m (397 ft)
- Lowest elevation: 1 m (3.3 ft)
- Population (2023): 286
  - Density: 39.6/km^{2} (102/sq mi)
- Time zone: UTC+01:00 (CET)
  - Summer (DST): UTC+02:00 (CEST)
- INSEE/Postal code: 50395 /50630
- ^{1} French Land Register data, which excludes lakes, ponds, glaciers > 1 km^{2} (0.386 sq mi or 247 acres) and river estuaries.

La Pernelle (French pronunciation: [la pɛʁnɛl]) is a commune in the Manche department in Normandy in north-western France.

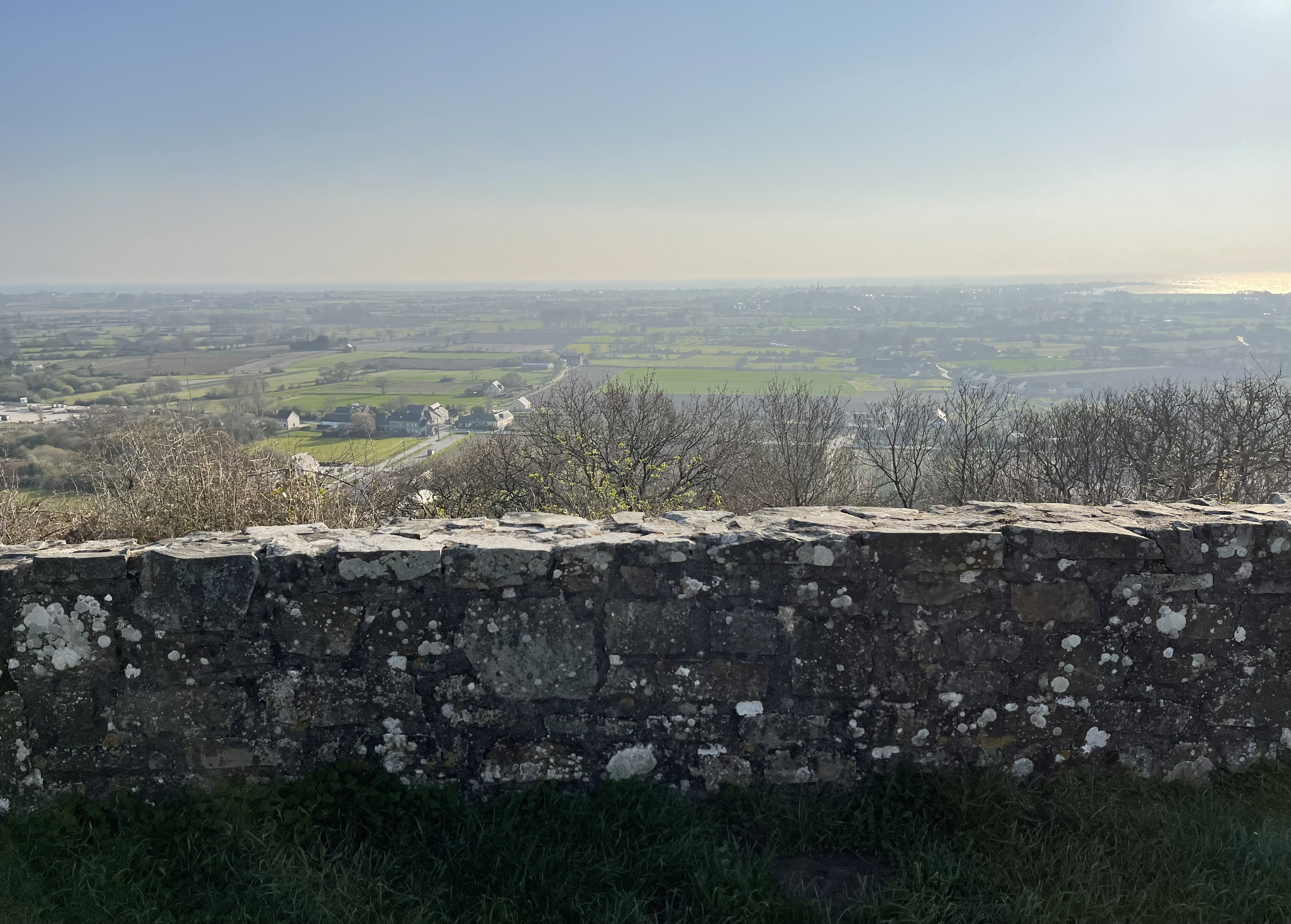
La Pernelle, the panoramic view from the top of the hill

== Places of interest ==
- The panorama from the top of the hill extends from coast West of the Phare de Gatteville to Saint-Vaast-la-Hougue and beyond, along the South-Eastern coast of the Manche department.
- The town hall is one of the smallest in France.
- The replica of the Grotto of Our Lady of Lourdes.

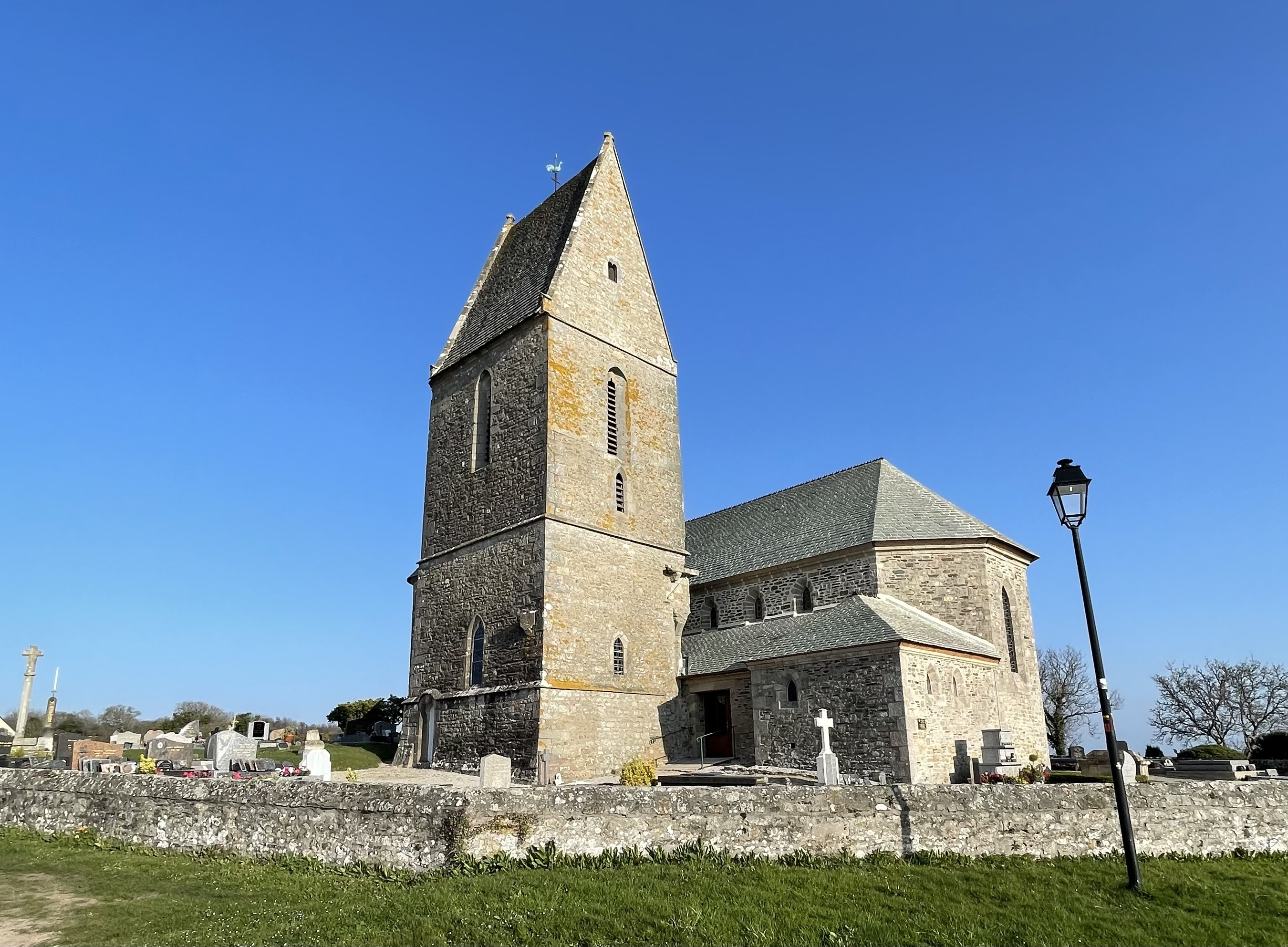
Eglise Sainte-Petronille de La Pernelle

== See also ==
- Communes of the Manche department
