= Vicq-sur-Mer =

- Commune
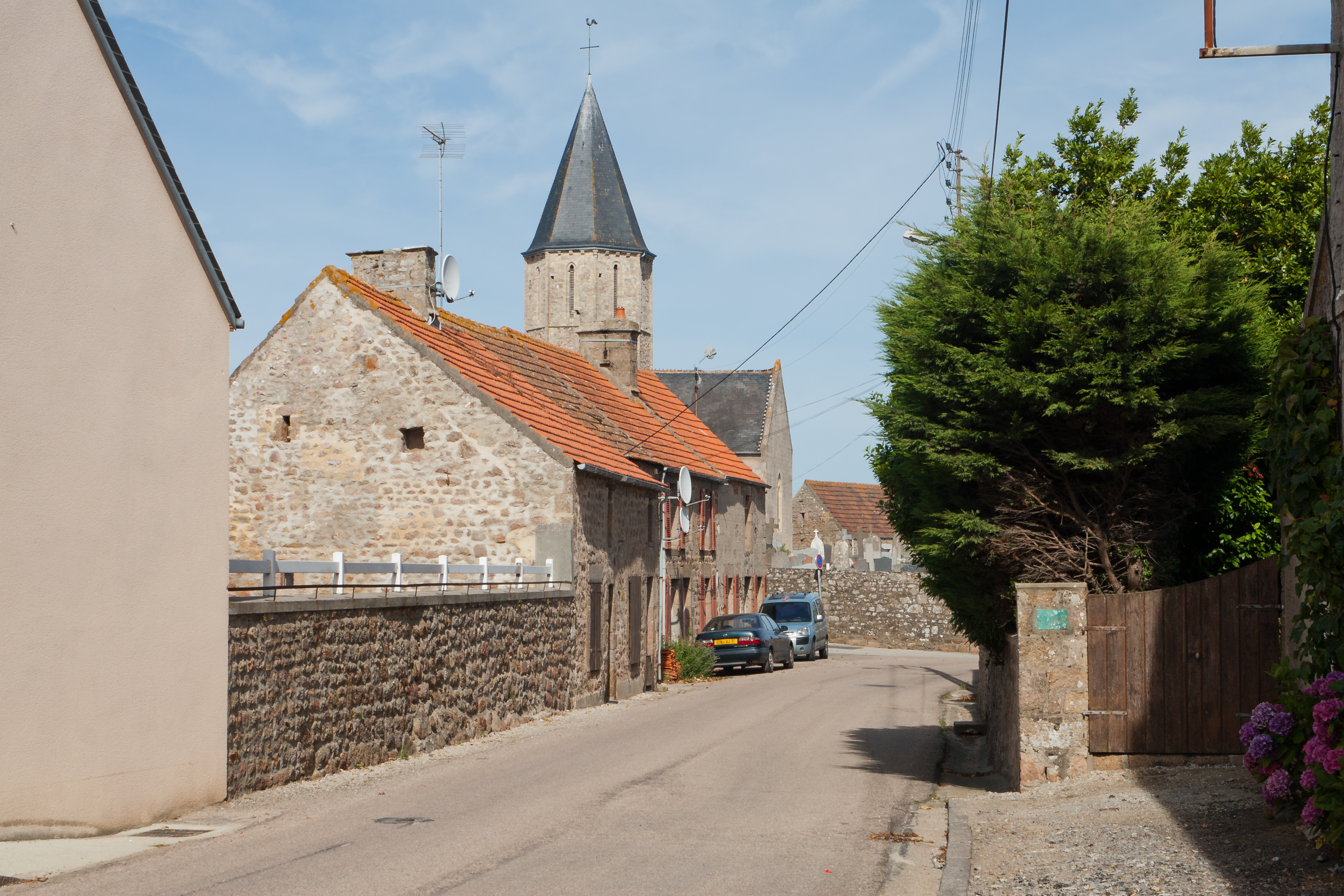
- The church and surroundings in Cosqueville
- Location of Vicq-sur-Mer
- Location within France Location within Normandy
- Coordinates: 49°41′38″N 1°24′32″W
- Country: France
- Region: Normandy
- Department: Manche
- Arrondissement: Cherbourg
- Canton: Val-de-Saire
- Intercommunality: CA Cotentin

Government
  - Mayor (2025–2026): Dominique Hauchecorne
- Area^{1}: 20.58 km^{2} (7.95 sq mi)
- Highest elevation: 85 m (279 ft)
- Lowest elevation: 0 m (0 ft)
- Population (2023): 1,093
  - Density: 53.11/km^{2} (137.6/sq mi)
- Time zone: UTC+01:00 (CET)
  - Summer (DST): UTC+02:00 (CEST)
- INSEE/Postal code: 50142 /50330
- ^{1} French Land Register data, which excludes lakes, ponds, glaciers > 1 km^{2} (0.386 sq mi or 247 acres) and river estuaries.

Vicq-sur-Mer (French pronunciation: [vik syʁ mɛʁ], literally Vicq on Sea) is a commune in the department of Manche, northwestern France.

== Geography ==
Vicq-sur-Mer is located in the northwestern part of France in the region of Normandy.

== History ==
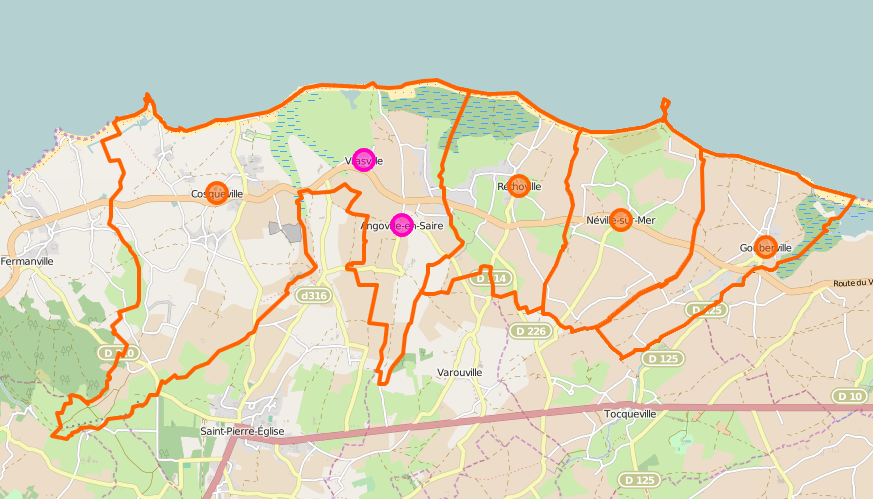
Map of the new municipality and its municipalities

The municipality was established on 1 January 2016 by merger of the former communes of Cosqueville (the seat), Gouberville, Néville-sur-Mer and Réthoville. The communes of Cosqueville, Gouberville, Néville-sur-Mer and Réthoville become delegated communes. The associated communes of Angoville-en-Saire and Vrasville disappear following the creation of the commune of Vicq-sur-Mer.

== Administration ==
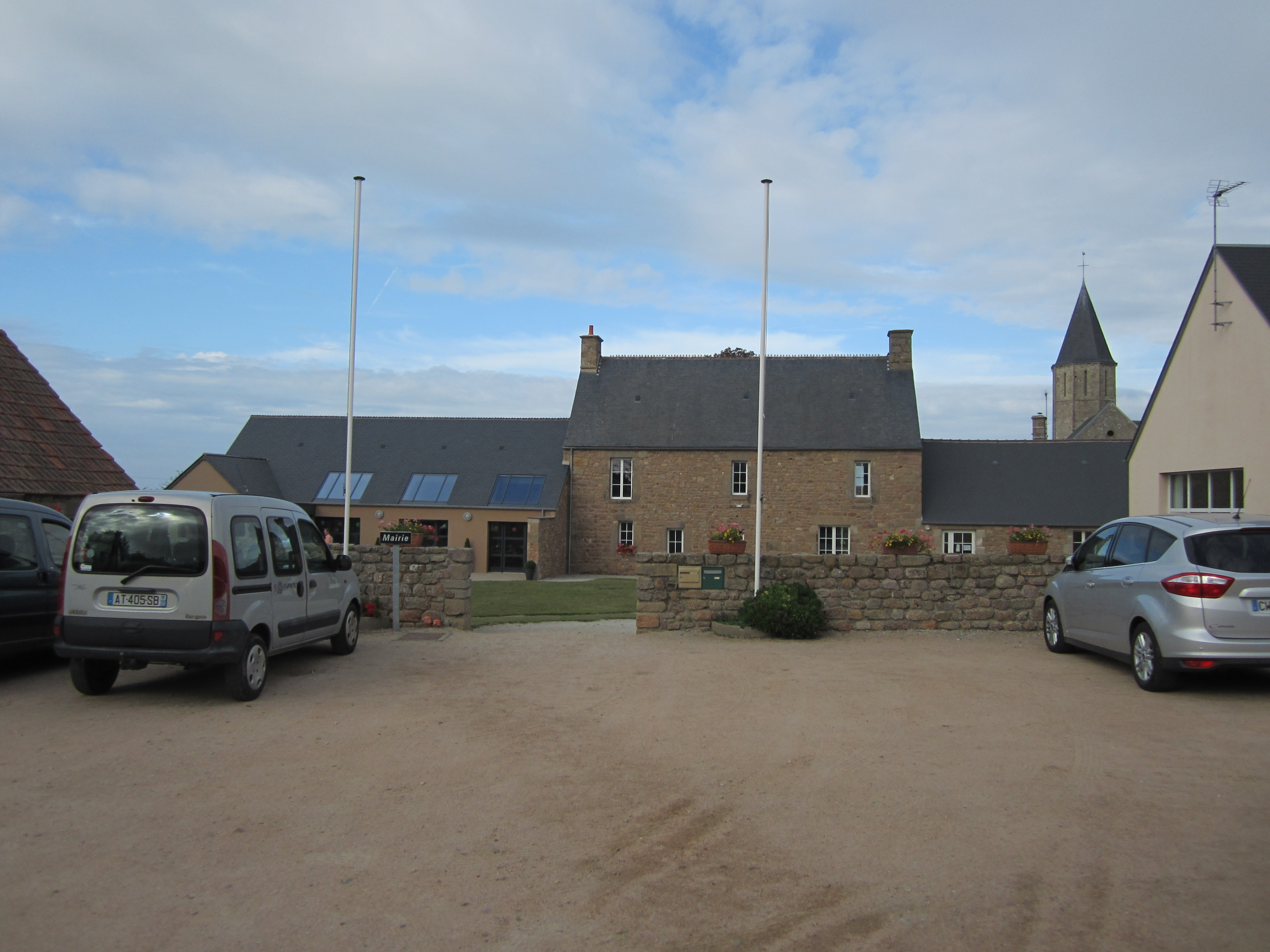
Town hall of Vicq-sur-Mer

| Election | Mayor | Party | Occupation |
|---|---|---|---|
| 2016 | Richard Leterrier | SE | Delegate mayor of Cosqueville |

== See also ==
- Communes of the Manche department
