= Crasville, Manche =

Crasville
- Commune
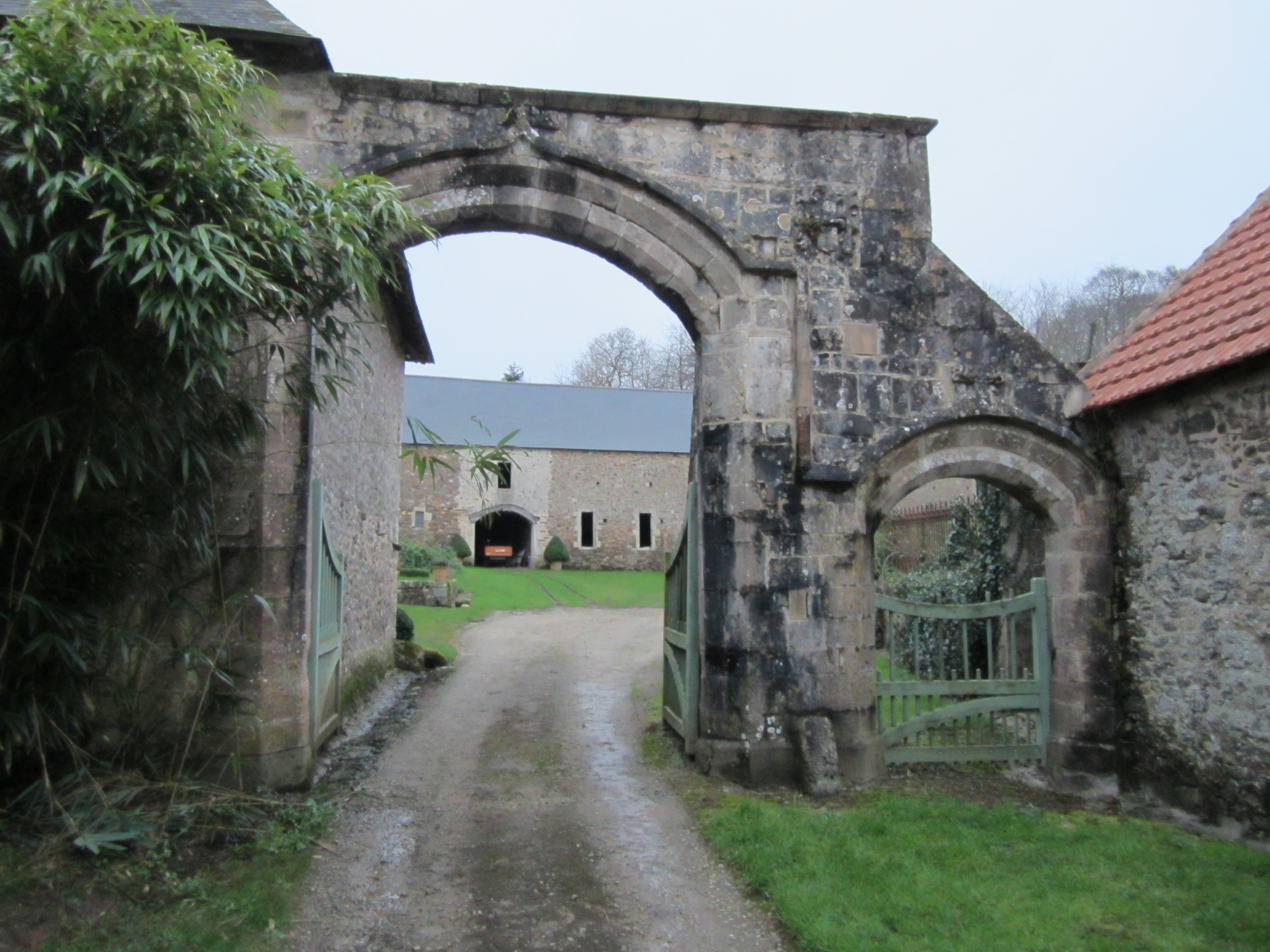
- Grenneville Pavilion

- Coat of arms
- Location of Crasville
- Location within France Location within Normandy
- Coordinates: 49°33′10″N 1°20′17″W
- Country: France
- Region: Normandy
- Department: Manche
- Arrondissement: Cherbourg
- Canton: Val-de-Saire
- Intercommunality: CA Cotentin

Government
  - Mayor (2020–2026): Bruno Lepley
- Area^{1}: 7.18 km^{2} (2.77 sq mi)
- Elevation: 49 m (161 ft)
- Highest elevation: 87 m (285 ft)
- Lowest elevation: 2 m (6.6 ft)
- Population (2023): 223
  - Density: 31.1/km^{2} (80.4/sq mi)
- Time zone: UTC+01:00 (CET)
  - Summer (DST): UTC+02:00 (CEST)
- INSEE/Postal code: 50150 /50630
- ^{1} French Land Register data, which excludes lakes, ponds, glaciers > 1 km^{2} (0.386 sq mi or 247 acres) and river estuaries.

Crasville (French pronunciation: [kʁavil]) is a commune in the Manche department in Normandy in north-western France.

== See also ==
- Communes of the Manche department
