= Brillevast =

- Commune
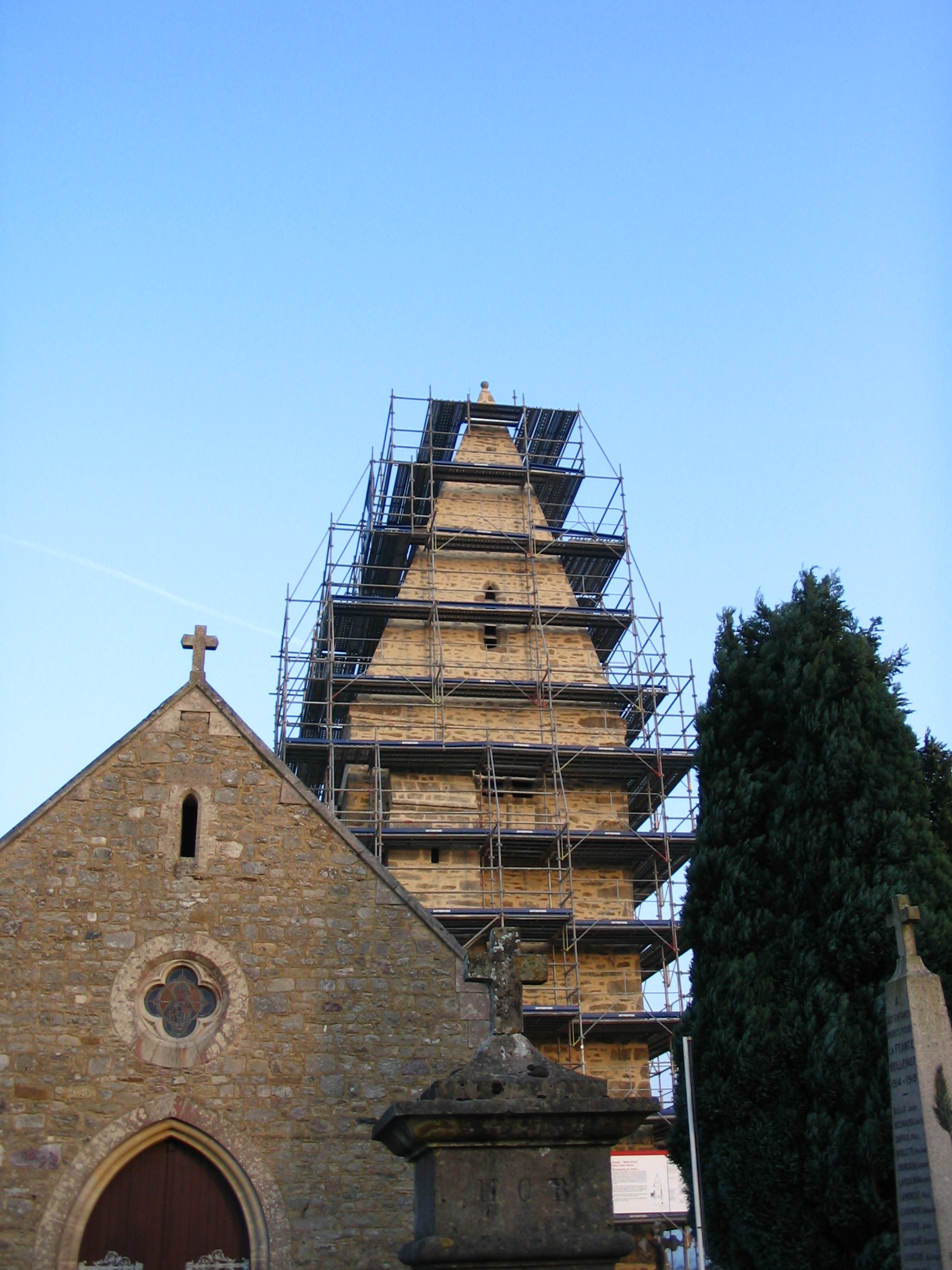
- The church of Saint-Martin during its restoration in 2004
- Location of Brillevast
- Location within France Location within Normandy
- Coordinates: 49°37′42″N 1°24′47″W
- Country: France
- Region: Normandy
- Department: Manche
- Arrondissement: Cherbourg
- Canton: Val-de-Saire
- Intercommunality: CA Cotentin

Government
  - Mayor (2020–2026): Gérard Vansteelant
- Area^{1}: 9.07 km^{2} (3.50 sq mi)
- Elevation: 127 m (417 ft)
- Highest elevation: 132 m (433 ft)
- Lowest elevation: 37 m (121 ft)
- Population (2023): 318
  - Density: 35.1/km^{2} (90.8/sq mi)
- Time zone: UTC+01:00 (CET)
  - Summer (DST): UTC+02:00 (CEST)
- INSEE/Postal code: 50086 /50330
- ^{1} French Land Register data, which excludes lakes, ponds, glaciers > 1 km^{2} (0.386 sq mi or 247 acres) and river estuaries.

Brillevast (French pronunciation: [bʁilva]) is a commune in the Manche department in Normandy in northwestern France.

== Population ==
Historical population
Year	Pop.	±% p.a.
1968	262	—
1975	257	−0.27%
1982	265	+0.44%
1990	308	+1.90%
1999	299	−0.33%
2007	275	−1.04%
2012	344	+4.58%
2017	325	−1.13%
2023	318	−0.36%
Source: INSEE

== See also ==
- Communes of the Manche department
