= Sainte-Geneviève, Manche =

Sainte-Geneviève
- Commune
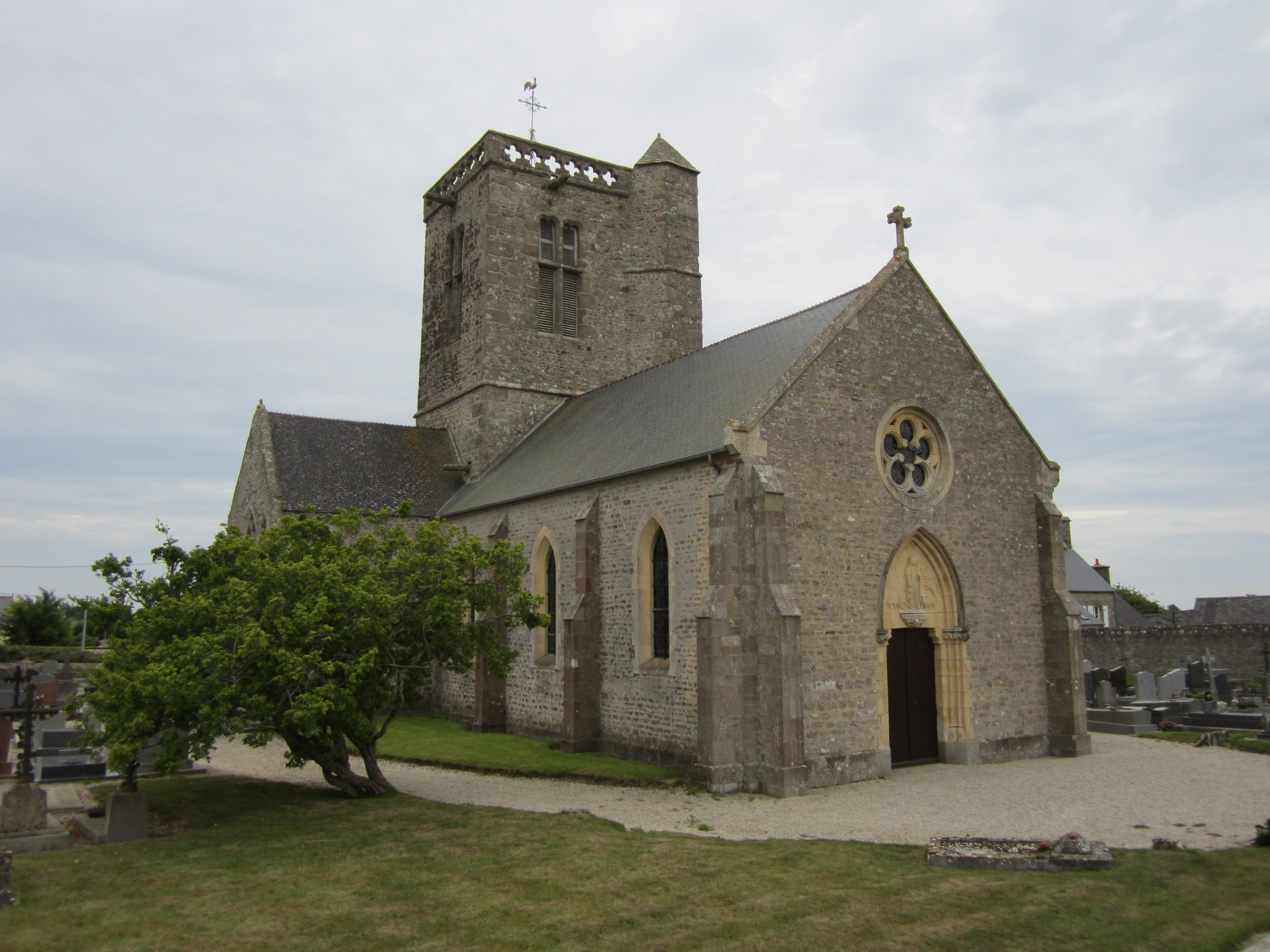
- The church of Sainte-Geneviève
- Location of Sainte-Geneviève
- Location within France Location within Normandy
- Coordinates: 49°39′27″N 1°18′40″W
- Country: France
- Region: Normandy
- Department: Manche
- Arrondissement: Cherbourg
- Canton: Val-de-Saire
- Intercommunality: CA Cotentin

Government
  - Mayor (2020–2026): Gilbert Lepetit
- Area^{1}: 4.95 km^{2} (1.91 sq mi)
- Elevation: 15 m (49 ft)
- Highest elevation: 60 m (200 ft)
- Lowest elevation: 9 m (30 ft)
- Population (2023): 299
  - Density: 60.4/km^{2} (156/sq mi)
- Time zone: UTC+01:00 (CET)
  - Summer (DST): UTC+02:00 (CEST)
- INSEE/Postal code: 50469 /50760
- ^{1} French Land Register data, which excludes lakes, ponds, glaciers > 1 km^{2} (0.386 sq mi or 247 acres) and river estuaries.

Sainte-Geneviève (French pronunciation: [sɛ̃t ʒənvjɛv]) is a commune in the Manche department in Normandy in north-western France.

== See also ==
- Communes of the Manche department
