= Aumeville-Lestre =

- Commune
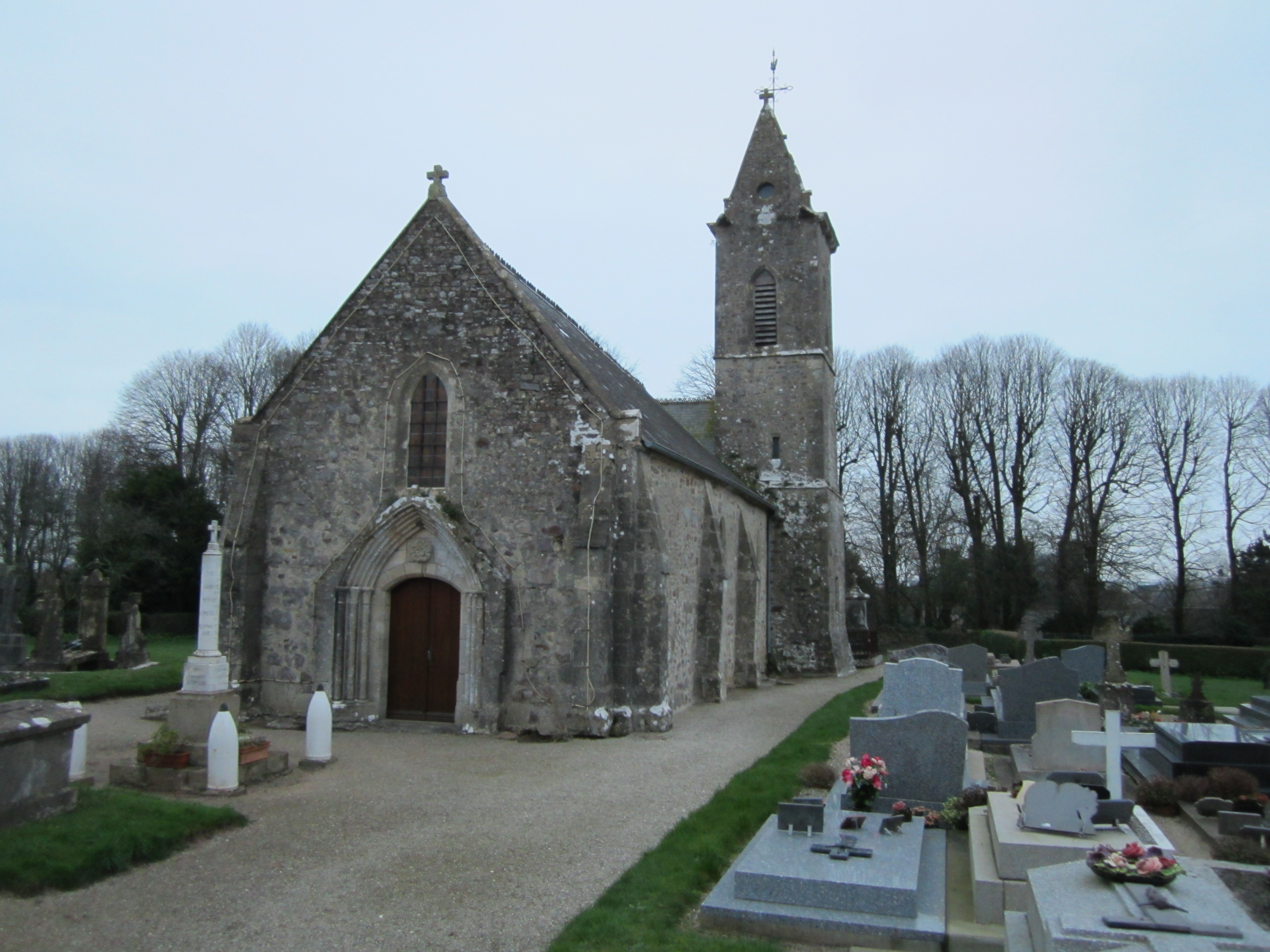
- Saint-Pierre church

- Coat of arms
- Location of Aumeville-Lestre
- Location within France Location within Normandy
- Coordinates: 49°32′25″N 1°19′12″W
- Country: France
- Region: Normandy
- Department: Manche
- Arrondissement: Cherbourg
- Canton: Val-de-Saire
- Intercommunality: CA Cotentin

Government
  - Mayor (2020–2026): Bernard Gosselin
- Area^{1}: 2.44 km^{2} (0.94 sq mi)
- Elevation: 10 m (33 ft)
- Highest elevation: 41 m (135 ft)
- Lowest elevation: 2 m (6.6 ft)
- Population (2023): 132
  - Density: 54.1/km^{2} (140/sq mi)
- Time zone: UTC+01:00 (CET)
  - Summer (DST): UTC+02:00 (CEST)
- INSEE/Postal code: 50022 /50630
- ^{1} French Land Register data, which excludes lakes, ponds, glaciers > 1 km^{2} (0.386 sq mi or 247 acres) and river estuaries.

Aumeville-Lestre is a commune in the Manche department in the Normandy region in northwestern France.

== Population ==
Historical population
| Year | Pop. | ±% p.a. |
|---|---|---|
| 1968 | 156 | — |
| 1975 | 147 | −0.85% |
| 1982 | 153 | +0.57% |
| 1990 | 134 | −1.64% |
| 1999 | 139 | +0.41% |
| 2007 | 139 | +0.00% |
| 2012 | 137 | −0.29% |
| 2017 | 114 | −3.61% |
| 2023 | 132 | +2.47% |
Source: INSEE

== See also ==
- Communes of the Manche department
