= Teurthéville-Bocage =

- Commune
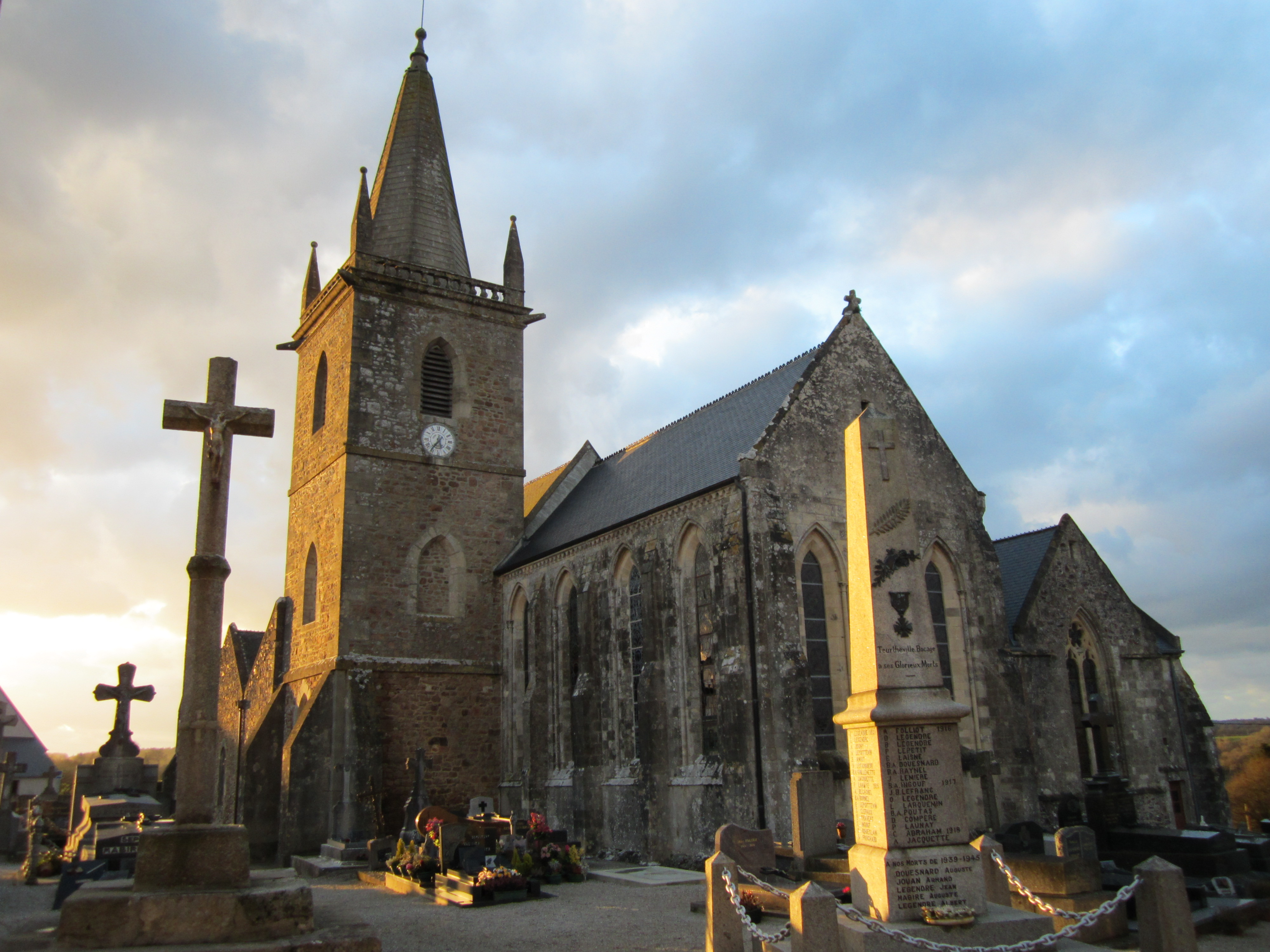
- The church of Sainte-Trinité
- Location of Teurthéville-Bocage
- Location within France Location within Normandy
- Coordinates: 49°35′34″N 1°23′42″W
- Country: France
- Region: Normandy
- Department: Manche
- Arrondissement: Cherbourg
- Canton: Val-de-Saire
- Intercommunality: CA Cotentin

Government
  - Mayor (2020–2026): Joanna Antoine
- Area^{1}: 21.47 km^{2} (8.29 sq mi)
- Elevation: 80 m (260 ft)
- Highest elevation: 116 m (381 ft)
- Lowest elevation: 32 m (105 ft)
- Population (2023): 594
  - Density: 27.7/km^{2} (71.7/sq mi)
- Time zone: UTC+01:00 (CET)
  - Summer (DST): UTC+02:00 (CEST)
- INSEE/Postal code: 50593 /50630
- ^{1} French Land Register data, which excludes lakes, ponds, glaciers > 1 km^{2} (0.386 sq mi or 247 acres) and river estuaries.

Teurthéville-Bocage (French pronunciation: [tœʁtevil bɔkaʒ]) is a commune in the Manche department in Normandy in north-western France.

== See also ==
- Communes of the Manche department
