= Sainte-Honorine-des-Pertes =

- Part of Aure sur Mer
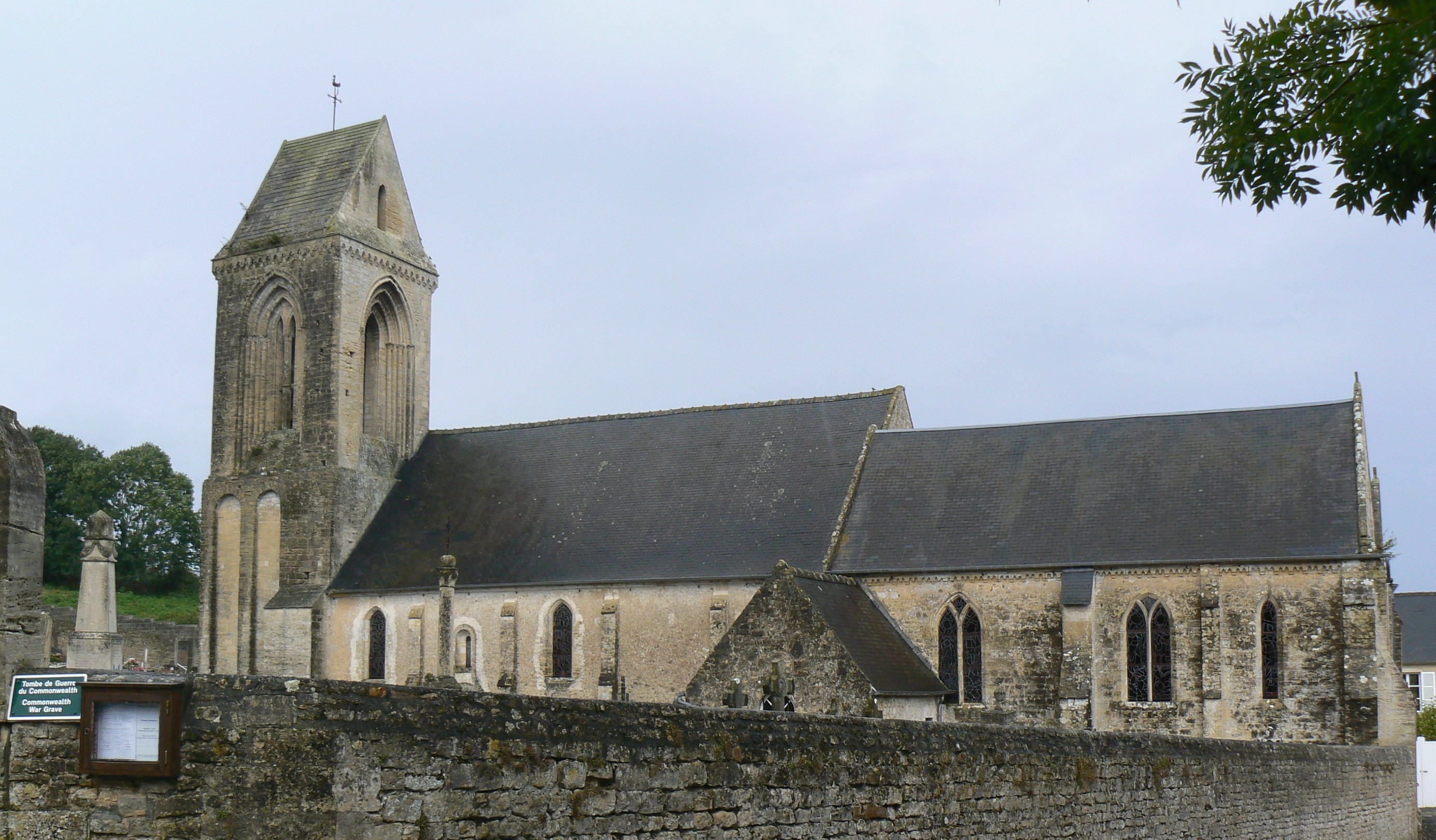
- Location of Sainte-Honorine-des-Pertes
- Location within France Location within Normandy
- Coordinates: 49°20′53″N 0°48′22″W
- Country: France
- Region: Normandy
- Department: Calvados
- Arrondissement: Bayeux
- Canton: Trévières
- Commune: Aure sur Mer
- Area^{1}: 5.69 km^{2} (2.20 sq mi)
- Elevation: 70 m (230 ft)
- Highest elevation: 78 m (256 ft)
- Lowest elevation: 0 m (0 ft)
- Population (2023): 525
  - Density: 92.3/km^{2} (239/sq mi)
- Time zone: UTC+01:00 (CET)
  - Summer (DST): UTC+02:00 (CEST)
- Postal code: 14520
- ^{1} French Land Register data, which excludes lakes, ponds, glaciers > 1 km^{2} (0.386 sq mi or 247 acres) and river estuaries.

Sainte-Honorine-des-Pertes (French pronunciation: [sɛ̃t ɔnɔʁin de pɛʁt]) is a former commune in the Calvados department in the Normandy region in northwestern France. On 1 January 2017, it was merged into the new commune Aure sur Mer.

== History ==
=== World War II ===
On 13 September 1942 13 British commandos landed at night near Sainte-Honorine-des-Pertes from a Motor Torpedo Boat in Operation Aquatint, a reconnaissance mission to collect information about the surrounding area, and took a German guard prisoner.

Sainte-Honorine-des-Pertes is located at the eastern end of Omaha Beach, one of the landings sites on D-Day, 6 June 1944, at the beginning of the Battle of Normandy, during World War II.

== See also ==
- Communes of the Calvados department
- History of the local ruined Saint Simeon chapel, with images
