= Valcanville =

- Commune
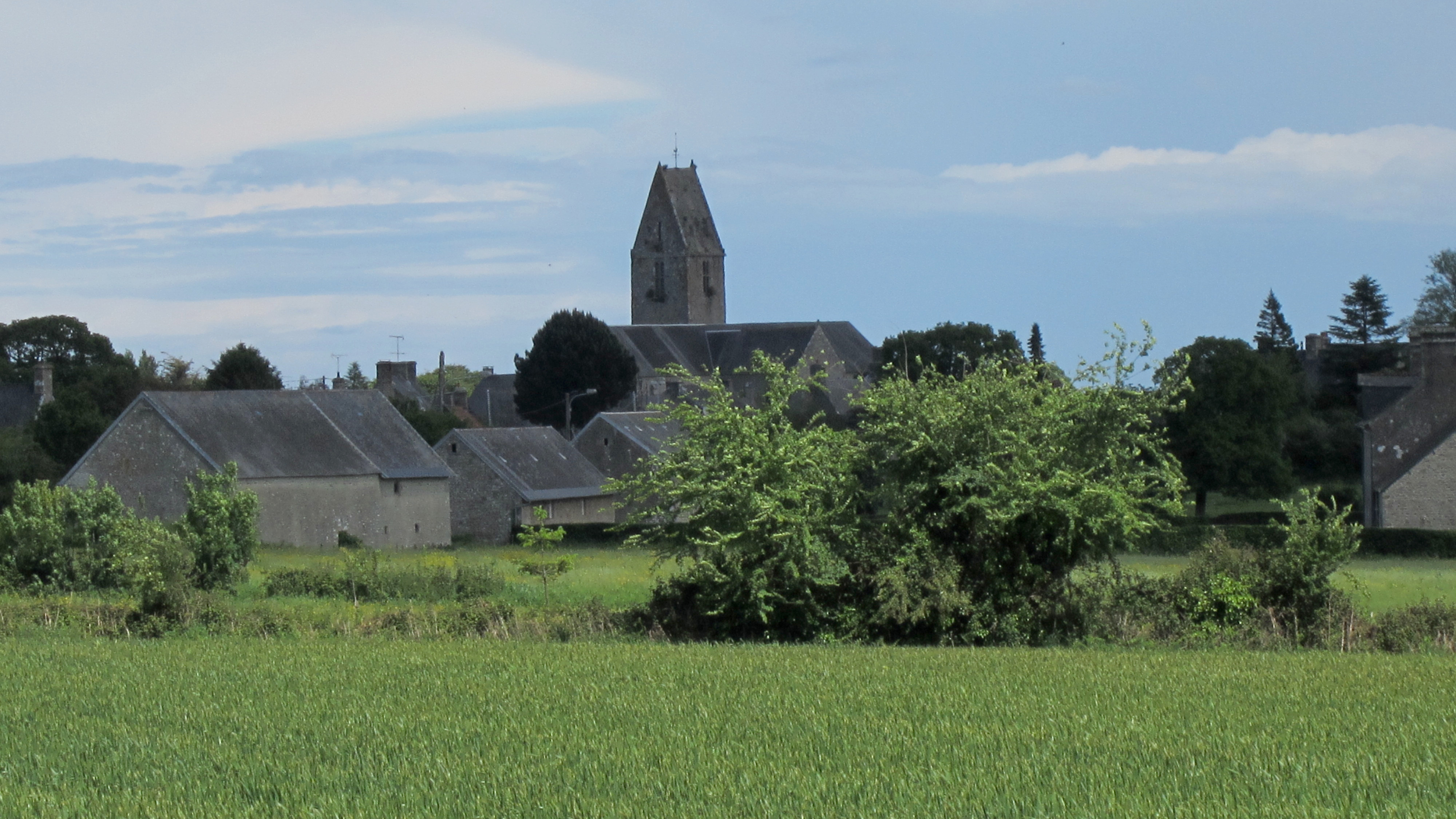
- Panorama

- Coat of arms
- Location of Valcanville
- Location within France Location within Normandy
- Coordinates: 49°38′40″N 1°19′41″W
- Country: France
- Region: Normandy
- Department: Manche
- Arrondissement: Cherbourg
- Canton: Val-de-Saire
- Intercommunality: CA Cotentin

Government
  - Mayor (2020–2026): Jacques Lecoq
- Area^{1}: 6.45 km^{2} (2.49 sq mi)
- Elevation: 25 m (82 ft)
- Highest elevation: 86 m (282 ft)
- Lowest elevation: 8 m (26 ft)
- Population (2023): 389
  - Density: 60.3/km^{2} (156/sq mi)
- Time zone: UTC+01:00 (CET)
  - Summer (DST): UTC+02:00 (CEST)
- INSEE/Postal code: 50613 /50760
- ^{1} French Land Register data, which excludes lakes, ponds, glaciers > 1 km^{2} (0.386 sq mi or 247 acres) and river estuaries.

Valcanville (French pronunciation: [valkɑ̃vil]) is a commune in the Manche department in Normandy in north-western France.

== See also ==
- Communes of the Manche department
