= Le Vast =

- Commune
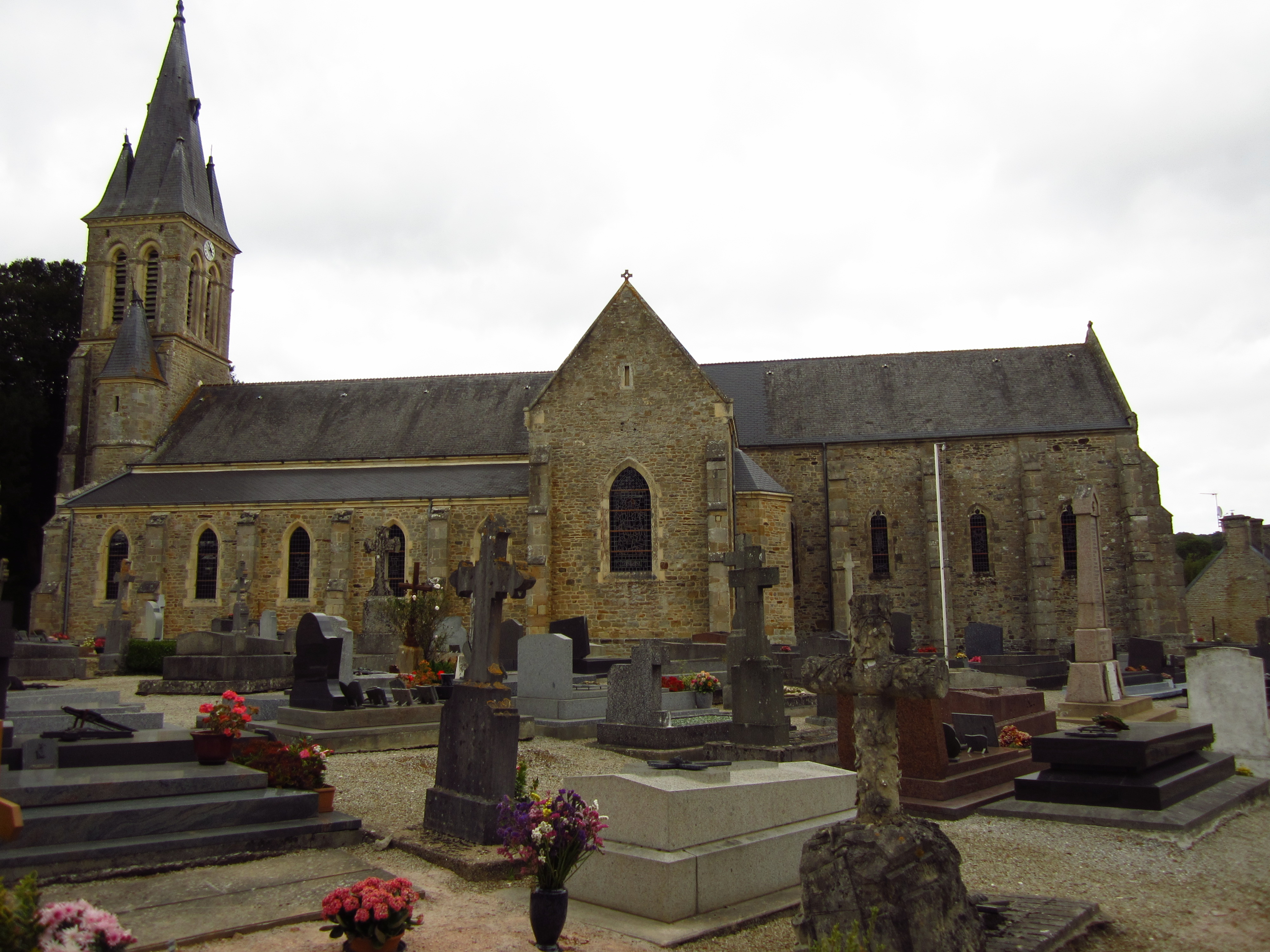
- Notre-Dame church
- Location of Le Vast
- Location within France Location within Normandy
- Coordinates: 49°37′24″N 1°21′23″W
- Country: France
- Region: Normandy
- Department: Manche
- Arrondissement: Cherbourg
- Canton: Val-de-Saire
- Intercommunality: CA Cotentin

Government
  - Mayor (2020–2026): Luc Solier
- Area^{1}: 13.04 km^{2} (5.03 sq mi)
- Elevation: 44 m (144 ft)
- Highest elevation: 107 m (351 ft)
- Lowest elevation: 24 m (79 ft)
- Population (2023): 321
  - Density: 24.6/km^{2} (63.8/sq mi)
- Time zone: UTC+01:00 (CET)
  - Summer (DST): UTC+02:00 (CEST)
- INSEE/Postal code: 50619 /50630
- ^{1} French Land Register data, which excludes lakes, ponds, glaciers > 1 km^{2} (0.386 sq mi or 247 acres) and river estuaries.

Le Vast (French pronunciation: [lə va]) is a commune in the Manche department in Normandy in north-western France. The village is located in the North-East of the Cotentin Peninsula in an area known as Val de Saire, literally the Vale the River Saire.

The river once powered several mills, including cotton mill founded by Philippe Fontenilliat in 1803. At its peak, the mill employed up to 600 workers before closing in 1858. It has since been replaced by the "Château de La Germonière". The estate is open to the public on certain occasions, and one of its most notable features is a pair of artificial waterfalls on the river, visible from the main road.

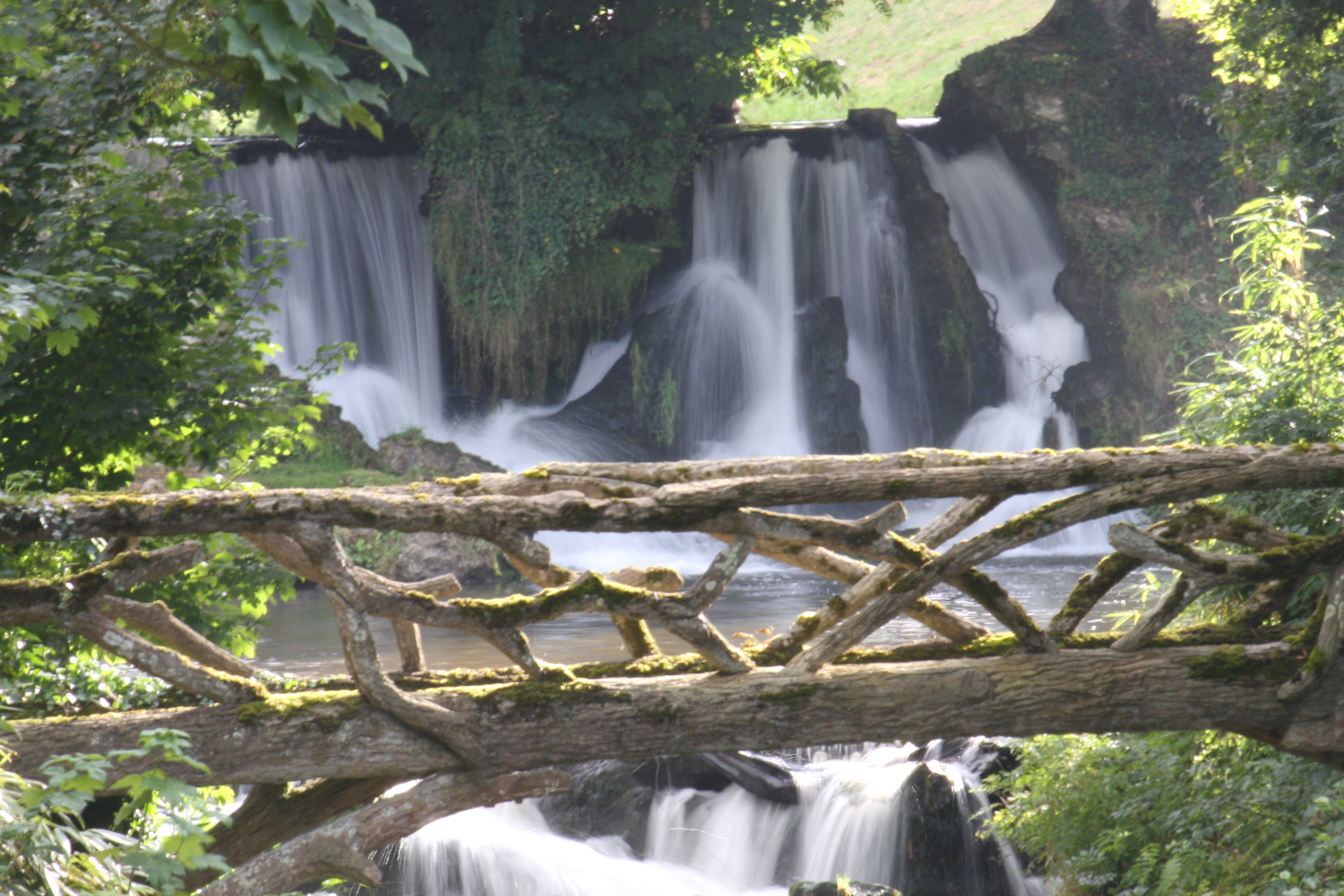
Artificial waterfalls on the River Saire.

== See also ==
- Communes of the Manche department
