= Gatteville-le-Phare =

- Commune
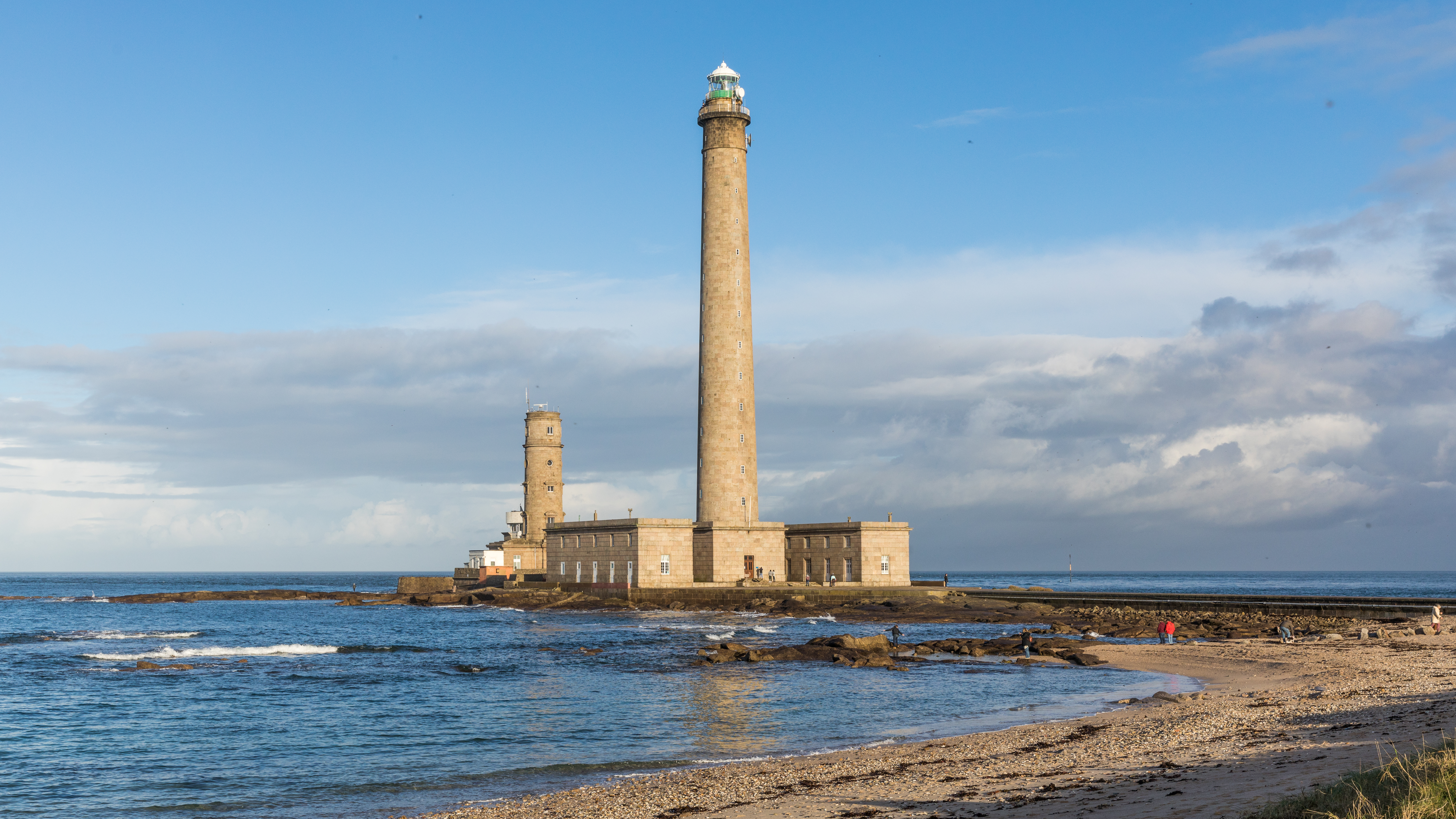
- The Gatteville lighthouse

- Coat of arms
- Location of Gatteville-le-Phare
- Location within France Location within Normandy
- Coordinates: 49°41′13″N 1°16′56″W
- Country: France
- Region: Normandy
- Department: Manche
- Arrondissement: Cherbourg
- Canton: Val-de-Saire
- Intercommunality: CA Cotentin

Government
  - Mayor (2020–2026): Christine Léonard
- Area^{1}: 9.70 km^{2} (3.75 sq mi)
- Highest elevation: 36 m (118 ft)
- Lowest elevation: 0 m (0 ft)
- Population (2023): 465
  - Density: 47.9/km^{2} (124/sq mi)
- Demonym: Gattevillais
- Time zone: UTC+01:00 (CET)
  - Summer (DST): UTC+02:00 (CEST)
- INSEE/Postal code: 50196 /50760
- ^{1} French Land Register data, which excludes lakes, ponds, glaciers > 1 km^{2} (0.386 sq mi or 247 acres) and river estuaries.

Gatteville-le-Phare (French pronunciation: [ɡatvil lə faʁ]) is a commune in the Manche department in north-western France.

== Gallery ==
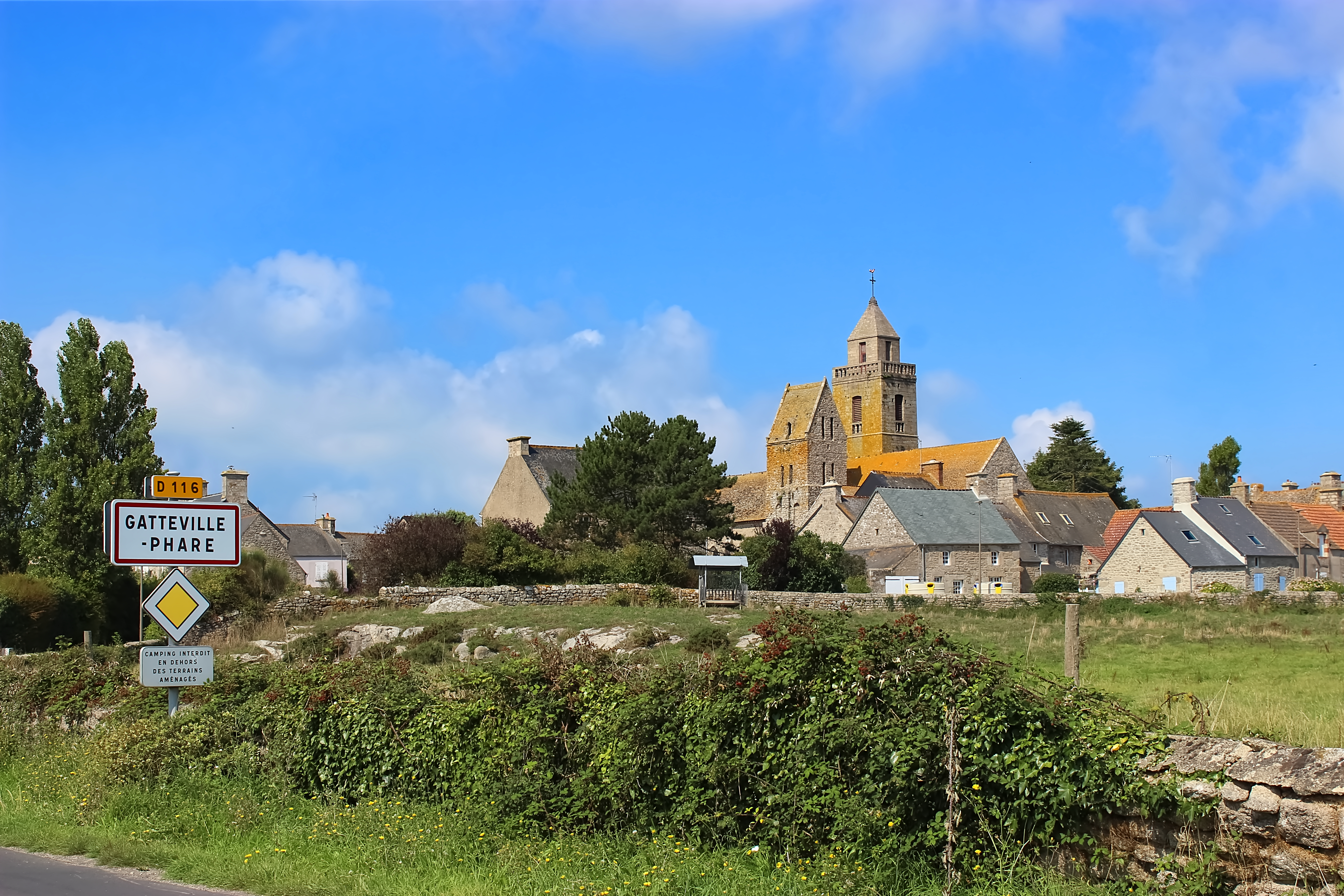
Gatteville-le-Phare

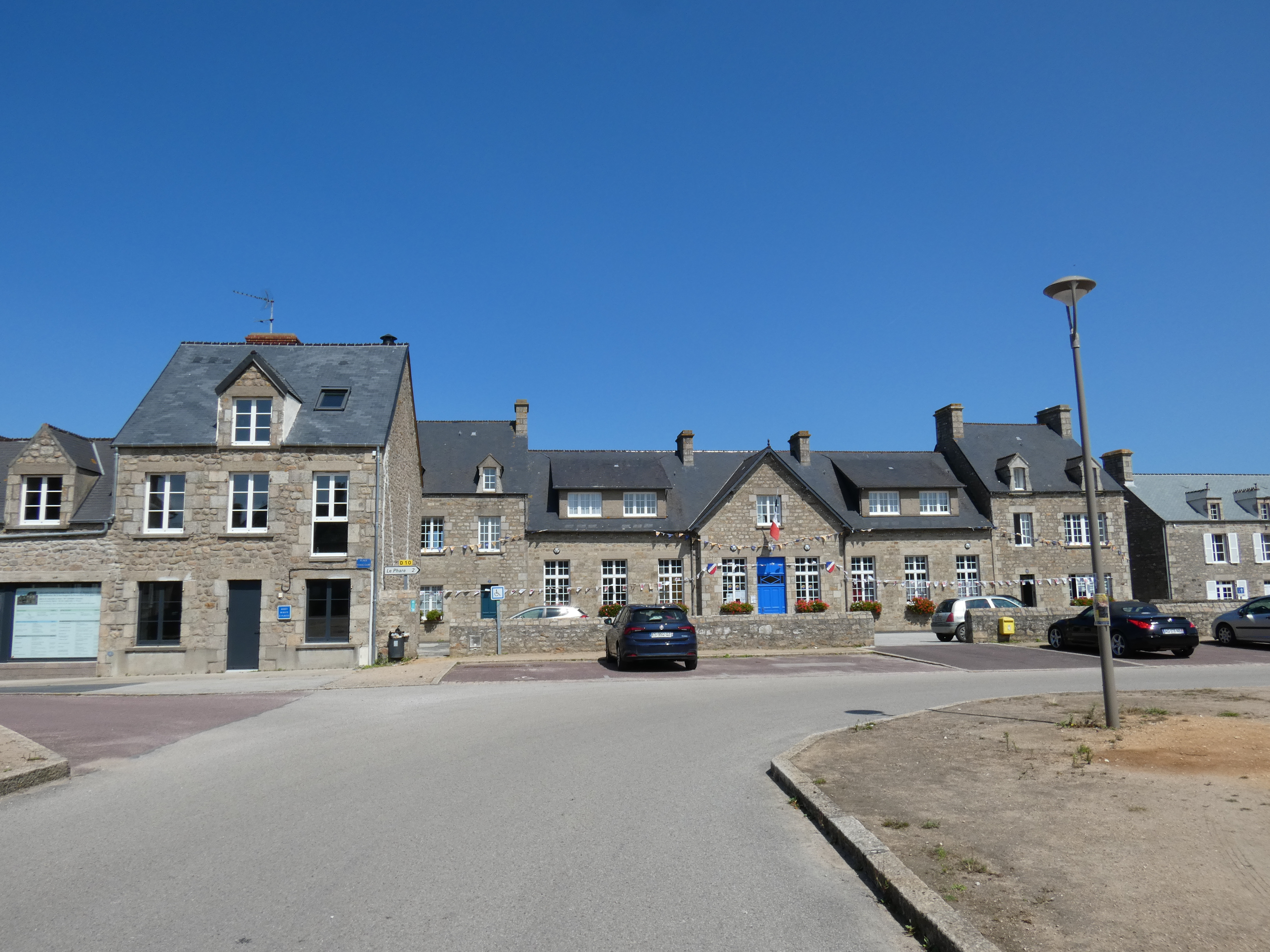
Place Notre Dame

== See also ==
- Communes of the Manche department
- Antipodes Islands, the exact antipodes of Gatteville-le-Phare
