= Anneville-en-Saire =

- Commune
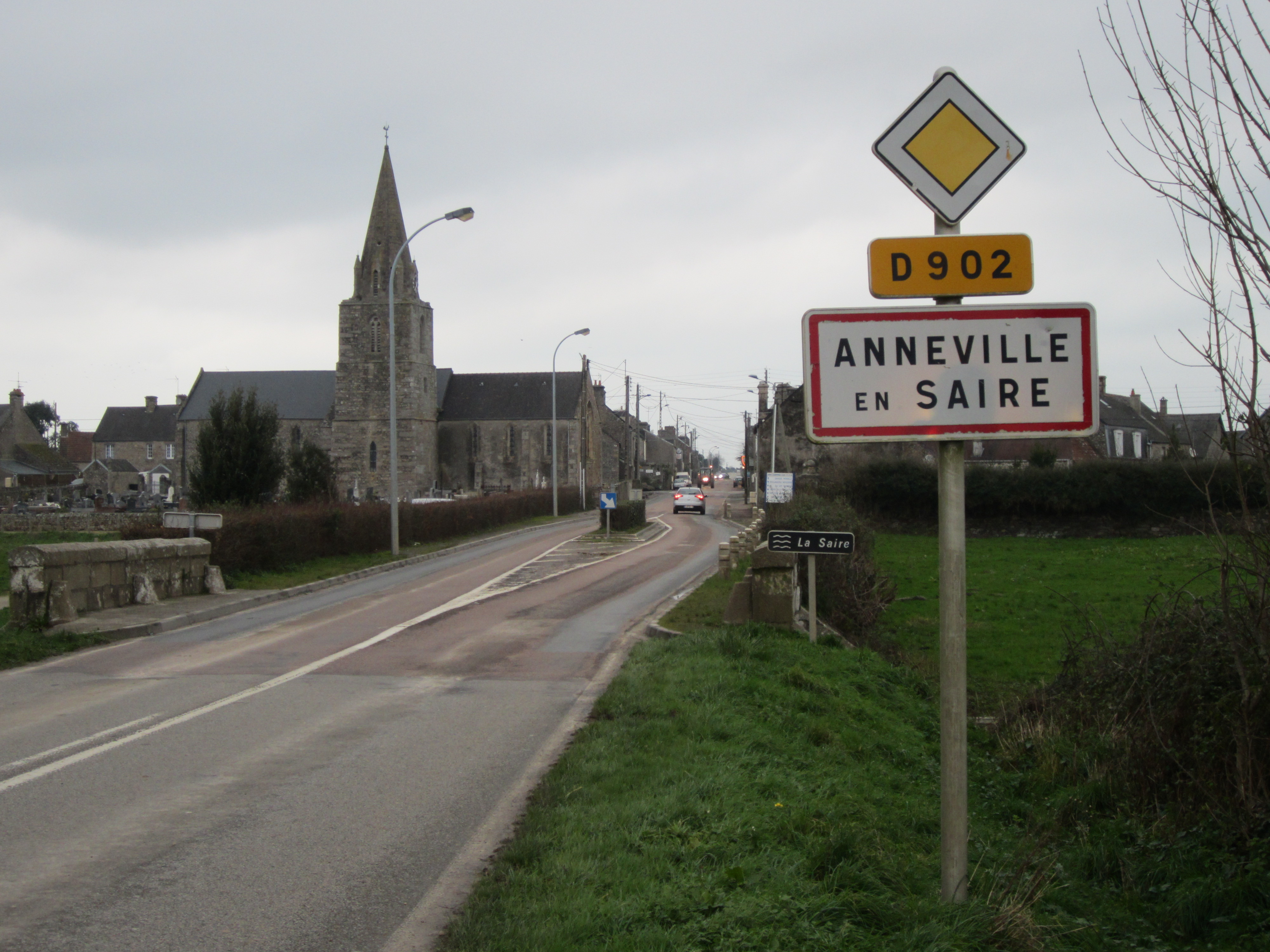
- The bridge on the Saire at the entrance to the village

- Coat of arms
- Location of Anneville-en-Saire
- Location within France Location within Normandy
- Coordinates: 49°38′13″N 1°17′06″W
- Country: France
- Region: Normandy
- Department: Manche
- Arrondissement: Cherbourg
- Canton: Val-de-Saire
- Intercommunality: CA Cotentin

Government
  - Mayor (2020–2026): Gérard Parent
- Area^{1}: 6 km^{2} (2.3 sq mi)
- Elevation: 10 m (33 ft)
- Population (2023): 370
  - Density: 62/km^{2} (160/sq mi)
- Time zone: UTC+01:00 (CET)
  - Summer (DST): UTC+02:00 (CEST)
- INSEE/Postal code: 50013 /50760
- ^{1} French Land Register data, which excludes lakes, ponds, glaciers > 1 km^{2} (0.386 sq mi or 247 acres) and river estuaries.

Anneville-en-Saire (French pronunciation: [anvil ɑ̃ sɛʁ]) is a commune in the Manche department of the Normandy region in northwestern France.

== Population ==
Historical population
Year	Pop.	±% p.a.
1968	425	—
1975	407	−0.62%
1982	374	−1.20%
1990	345	−1.00%
1999	324	−0.70%
2007	369	+1.64%
2012	388	+1.01%
2017	390	+0.10%
2023	370	−0.87%
Source: INSEE

== Heraldry ==
Arms of Anneville-en-Saire	The arms of Anneville-en-Saire are blazoned : Ermine, a fess engrailed in chief gules.

== See also ==
- Communes of the Manche department
