= Octeville-l'Avenel =

- Commune
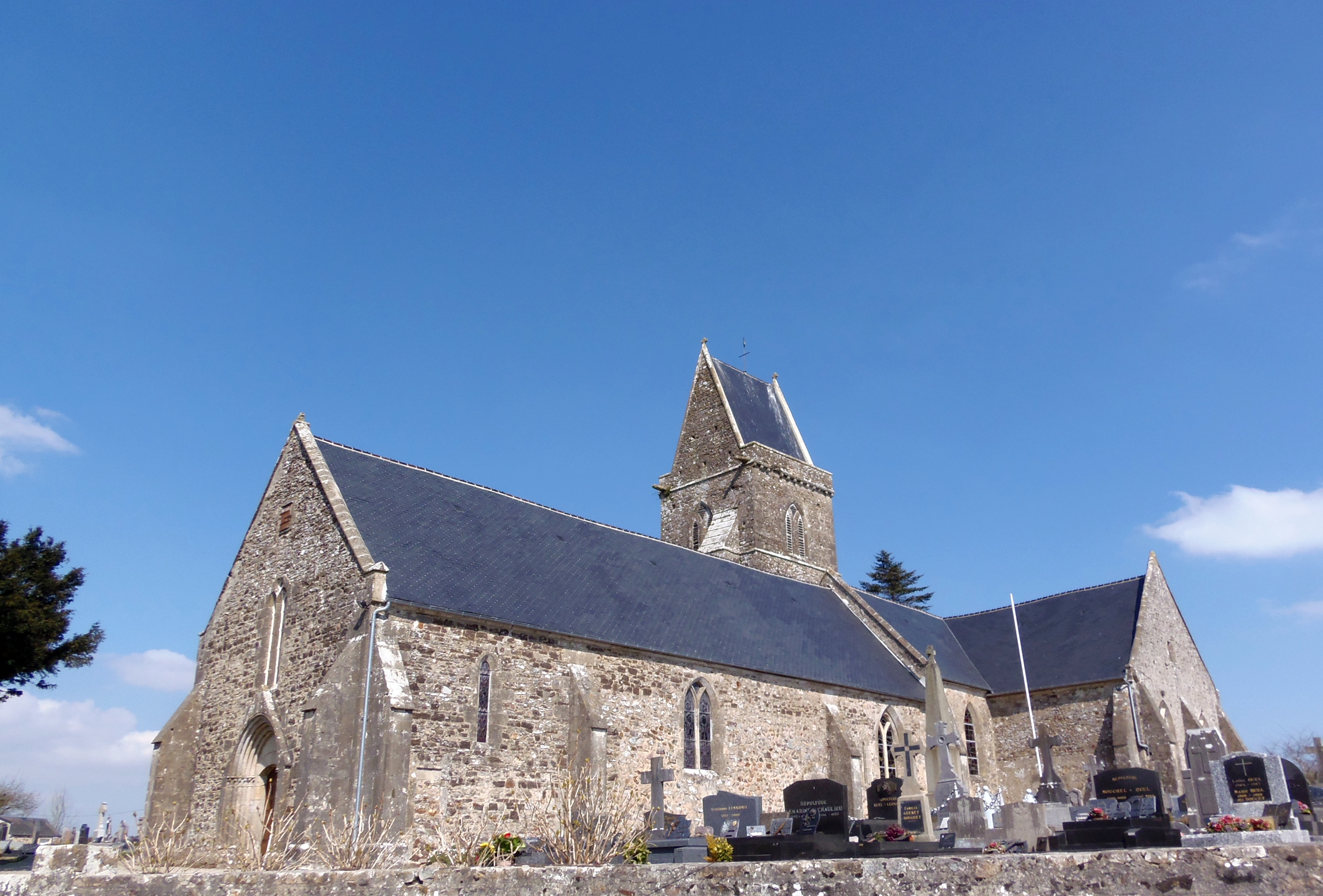
- The church of Saint-Martin
- Location of Octeville-l'Avenel
- Location within France Location within Normandy
- Coordinates: 49°32′39″N 1°21′11″W
- Country: France
- Region: Normandy
- Department: Manche
- Arrondissement: Cherbourg
- Canton: Val-de-Saire
- Intercommunality: CA Cotentin

Government
  - Mayor (2020–2026): Isabelle Lechevalier
- Area^{1}: 6.86 km^{2} (2.65 sq mi)
- Elevation: 40 m (130 ft)
- Highest elevation: 82 m (269 ft)
- Lowest elevation: 20 m (66 ft)
- Population (2023): 235
  - Density: 34.3/km^{2} (88.7/sq mi)
- Time zone: UTC+01:00 (CET)
  - Summer (DST): UTC+02:00 (CEST)
- INSEE/Postal code: 50384 /50630
- ^{1} French Land Register data, which excludes lakes, ponds, glaciers > 1 km^{2} (0.386 sq mi or 247 acres) and river estuaries.

Octeville-l'Avenel (before 1962: Octeville) is a commune in the Manche department in Normandy in north-western France.

== Notable people ==
Robert Avenel, Anglo-Norman magnate

== See also ==
- Communes of the Manche department
