= Le Mesnil-au-Val =

- Commune
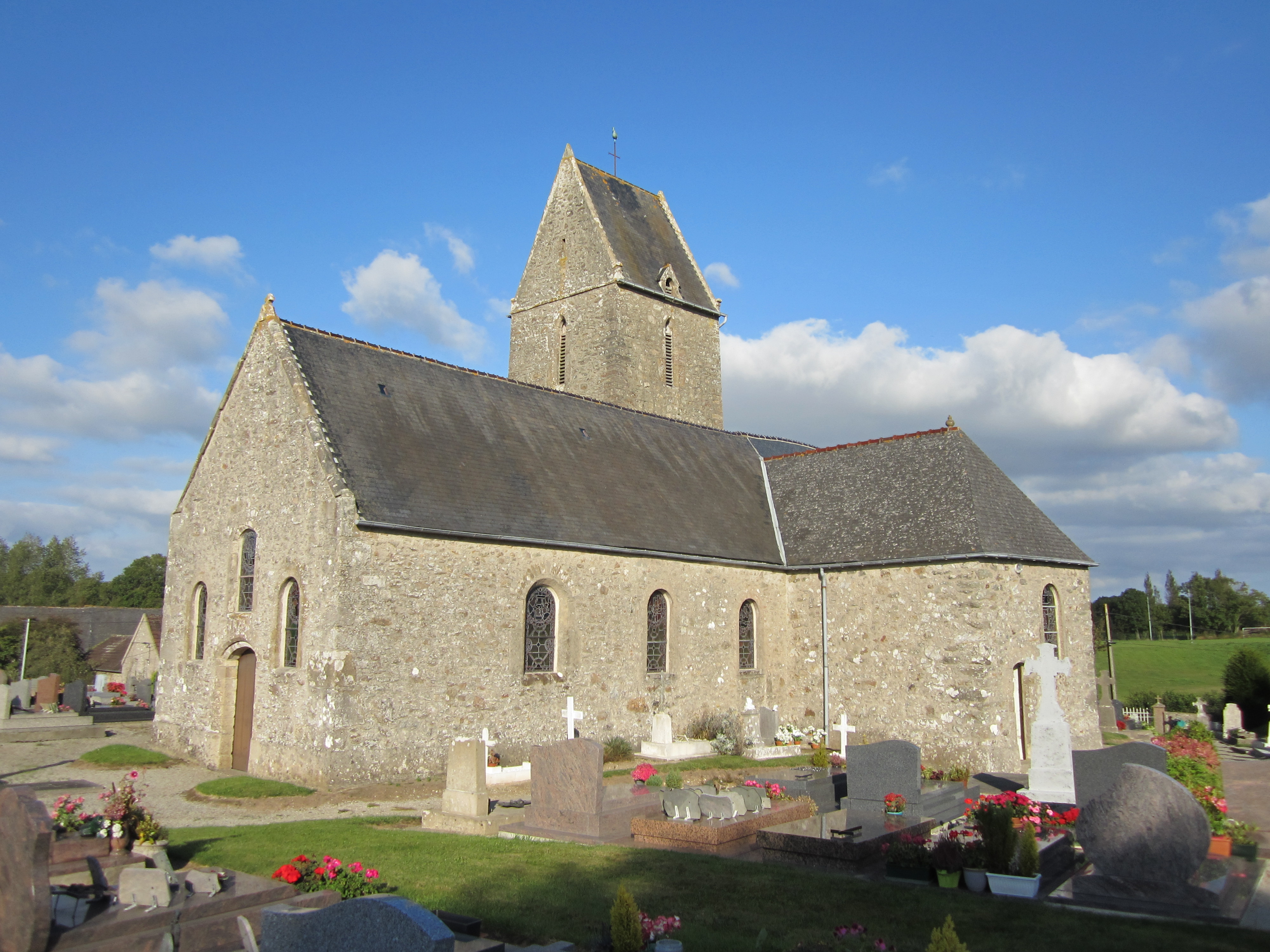
- The church of Notre-Dame
- Location of Le Mesnil-au-Val
- Location within France Location within Normandy
- Coordinates: 49°36′26″N 1°31′24″W
- Country: France
- Region: Normandy
- Department: Manche
- Arrondissement: Cherbourg
- Canton: Cherbourg-en-Cotentin-5
- Intercommunality: CA Cotentin

Government
  - Mayor (2020–2026): Évelyne Mouchel Dit Simon
- Area^{1}: 13.34 km^{2} (5.15 sq mi)
- Elevation: 109 m (358 ft)
- Highest elevation: 178 m (584 ft)
- Lowest elevation: 73 m (240 ft)
- Population (2023): 729
  - Density: 54.6/km^{2} (142/sq mi)
- Time zone: UTC+01:00 (CET)
  - Summer (DST): UTC+02:00 (CEST)
- INSEE/Postal code: 50305 /50110
- ^{1} French Land Register data, which excludes lakes, ponds, glaciers > 1 km^{2} (0.386 sq mi or 247 acres) and river estuaries.

Le Mesnil-au-Val (French pronunciation: [lə menil o val]) is a commune in the Manche department in Normandy in north-western France.

== See also ==
- Communes of the Manche department
