= Varouville =

- Commune
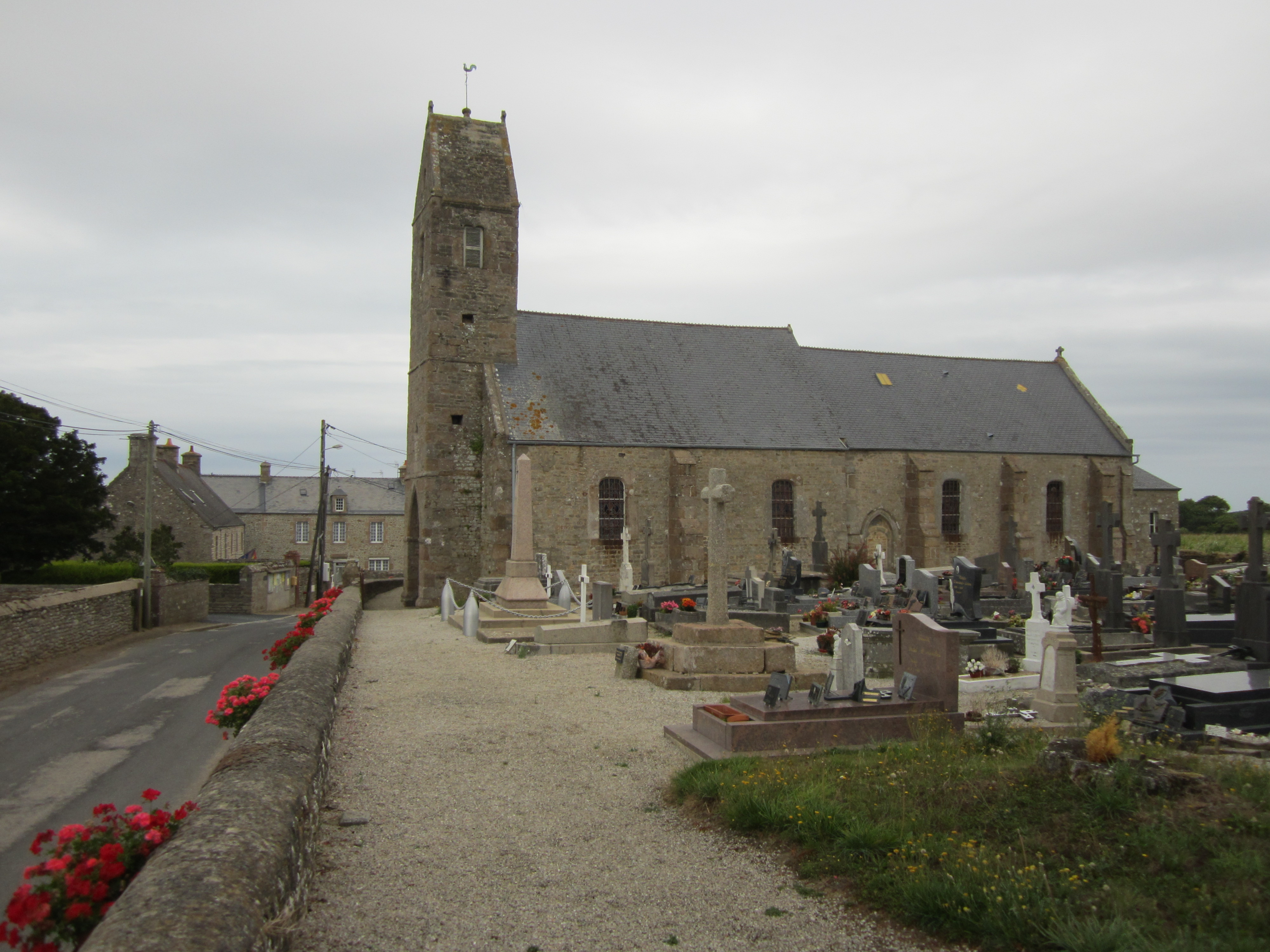
- The church of Saint-Martin
- Location of Varouville
- Location within France Location within Normandy
- Coordinates: 49°40′37″N 1°21′59″W
- Country: France
- Region: Normandy
- Department: Manche
- Arrondissement: Cherbourg
- Canton: Val-de-Saire
- Intercommunality: CA Cotentin

Government
  - Mayor (2020–2026): Françoise Medernach
- Area^{1}: 4.19 km^{2} (1.62 sq mi)
- Elevation: 50 m (160 ft)
- Highest elevation: 108 m (354 ft)
- Lowest elevation: 22 m (72 ft)
- Population (2023): 216
  - Density: 51.6/km^{2} (134/sq mi)
- Demonym: Varouvillais
- Time zone: UTC+01:00 (CET)
  - Summer (DST): UTC+02:00 (CEST)
- INSEE/Postal code: 50618 /50330
- ^{1} French Land Register data, which excludes lakes, ponds, glaciers > 1 km^{2} (0.386 sq mi or 247 acres) and river estuaries.

Varouville (French pronunciation: [vaʁuvil]) is a commune in the Manche department in Normandy in north-western France.

== See also ==
- Communes of the Manche department
