= Saint-Pierre-Église =

- Commune
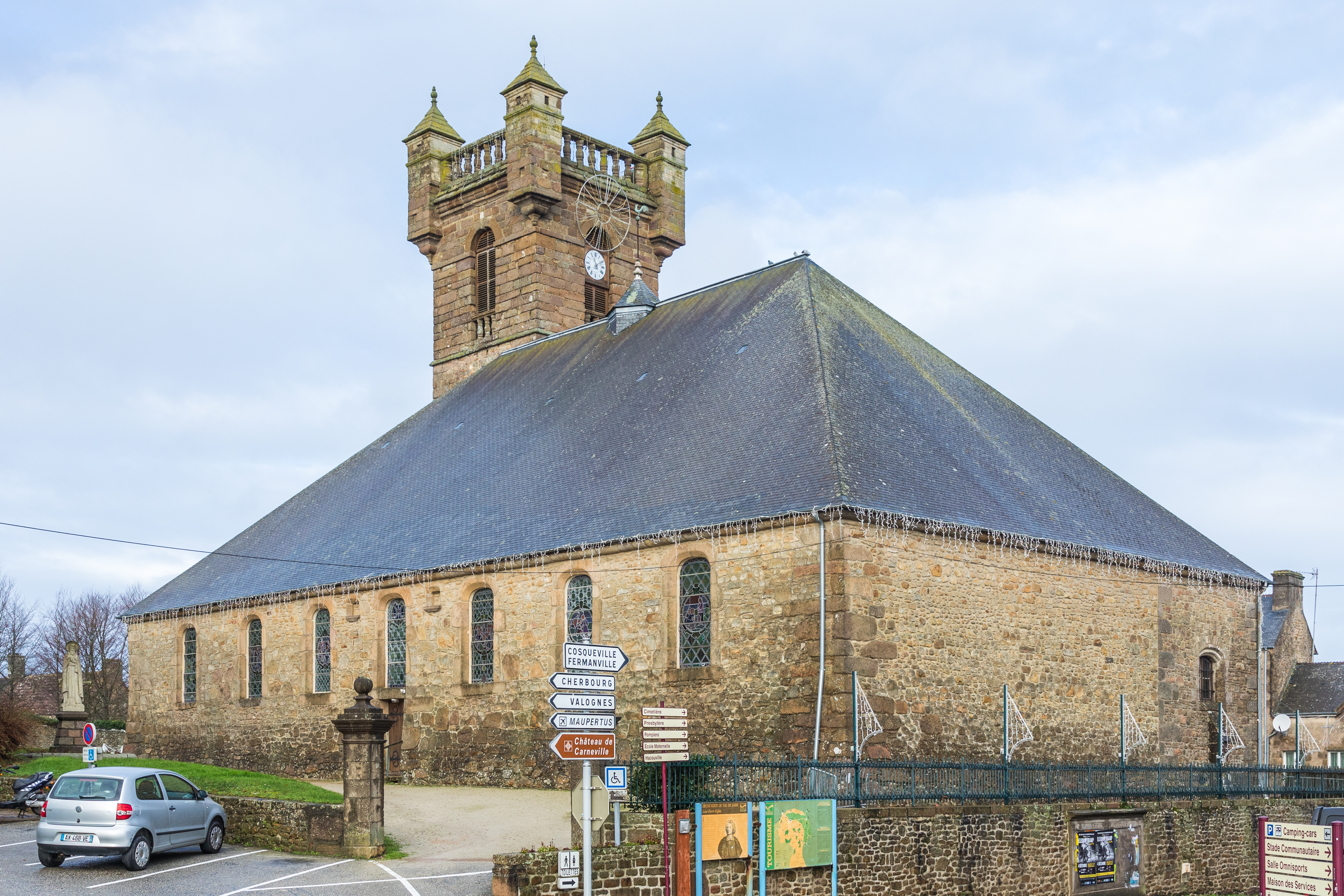
- The church in Saint-Pierre-Église

- Coat of arms
- Location of Saint-Pierre-Église
- Location within France Location within Normandy
- Coordinates: 49°40′09″N 1°24′10″W
- Country: France
- Region: Normandy
- Department: Manche
- Arrondissement: Cherbourg
- Canton: Val-de-Saire
- Intercommunality: CA Cotentin

Government
  - Mayor (2020–2026): Daniel Denis
- Area^{1}: 8.06 km^{2} (3.11 sq mi)
- Elevation: 110 m (360 ft)
- Highest elevation: 138 m (453 ft)
- Lowest elevation: 4 m (13 ft)
- Population (2023): 1,765
  - Density: 219/km^{2} (567/sq mi)
- Time zone: UTC+01:00 (CET)
  - Summer (DST): UTC+02:00 (CEST)
- INSEE/Postal code: 50539 /50330
- ^{1} French Land Register data, which excludes lakes, ponds, glaciers > 1 km^{2} (0.386 sq mi or 247 acres) and river estuaries.

Saint-Pierre-Église (French pronunciation: [sɛ̃ pjɛʁ eɡliz]) is a commune in the Manche department in Normandy in north-western France.

A market takes place in Saint-Pierre-Église every Wednesday.

== International relations ==
Saint-Pierre-Église is twinned with Twyford, United Kingdom.

== See also ==
- Communes of the Manche department
