= Russy, Calvados =

Russy
- Part of Aure sur Mer
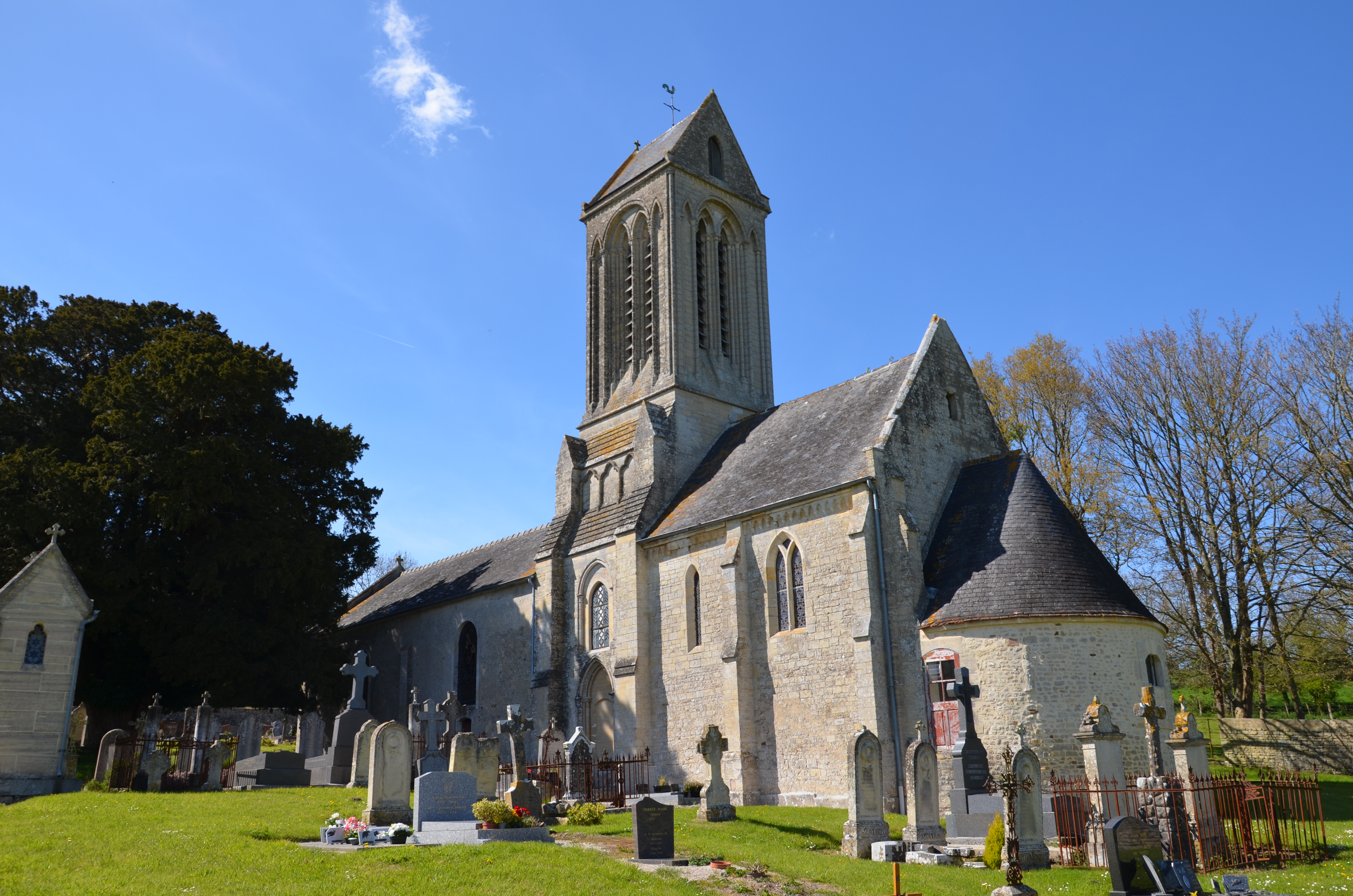

- Coat of arms
- Location of Russy
- Location within France Location within Normandy
- Coordinates: 49°20′00″N 0°49′07″W
- Country: France
- Region: Normandy
- Department: Calvados
- Arrondissement: Bayeux
- Canton: Trévières
- Commune: Aure sur Mer
- Area^{1}: 4.86 km^{2} (1.88 sq mi)
- Elevation: 40 m (130 ft)
- Highest elevation: 78 m (256 ft)
- Lowest elevation: 7 m (23 ft)
- Population (2023): 167
  - Density: 34.4/km^{2} (89.0/sq mi)
- Time zone: UTC+01:00 (CET)
  - Summer (DST): UTC+02:00 (CEST)
- Postal code: 14710
- ^{1} French Land Register data, which excludes lakes, ponds, glaciers > 1 km^{2} (0.386 sq mi or 247 acres) and river estuaries.

Russy (French pronunciation: [ʁysi]) is a former commune in the Calvados department in the Normandy region in northwestern France. On 1 January 2017, it was merged into the new commune Aure sur Mer.

== See also ==
- Communes of the Calvados department
