= Canton of Val-de-Saire =

Coordinates: 49.59°N 1.27°W

The canton of Val-de-Saire is an administrative division of the Manche department, northwestern France. It was created at the French canton reorganisation which came into effect in March 2015. Its seat is in Saint-Vaast-la-Hougue.

It consists of the following communes:

- Anneville-en-Saire
- Aumeville-Lestre
- Barfleur
- Brillevast
- Canteloup
- Carneville
- Clitourps
- Crasville
- Fermanville
- Gatteville-le-Phare
- Gonneville-le-Theil
- Maupertus-sur-Mer
- Montfarville
- Octeville-l'Avenel
- La Pernelle
- Quettehou
- Réville
- Sainte-Geneviève
- Saint-Pierre-Église
- Saint-Vaast-la-Hougue
- Teurthéville-Bocage
- Théville
- Tocqueville
- Valcanville
- Varouville
- Le Vast
- Le Vicel
- Vicq-sur-Mer
- Videcosville
