= French ship Hardi =

Three vessels of the French Navy have borne the name Hardi, the name being the French word for "daring":

- Hardi – launched in 1750 as the name ship of her class of 64-gun ships of the line.
- Hardi – 1797–1799: gunboat
- Hardi – launched in 1794 as the name ship of her two-vessel class of 6-gun cutters. Sold 1803.

In addition, several French privateers have also borne the name, or a variant:

- Hardi Mendicant was a French privateer cutter of Dunkirk that Montagu captured on 15 February 1759.
- Hardi was a French privateer, of Bayonne, that Tweed captured on 15 March 1761 off Cape Finisterre.
- HMS Hardi was the French 18-gun privateer sloop Hardi that Hazard captured on 1 April 1797. The Navy sold Hardi in 1800.
- Hardi was a French privateer lugger from Cherbourg that the hired armed cutter Telemachus captured in July 1797
- Hardi was a privateer schooner from Guadeloupe, of four guns and 47 men, that the sloop HMS Hawk captured in 1798
- HMS Hardi was the French privateer Hardi that HMS Anson captured in 1800. Later that year her name was changed to HMS Rosario. She was broken up in 1809.
