= Edward Rotheram =

British Royal Navy officer

Captain Edward Rotheram CB
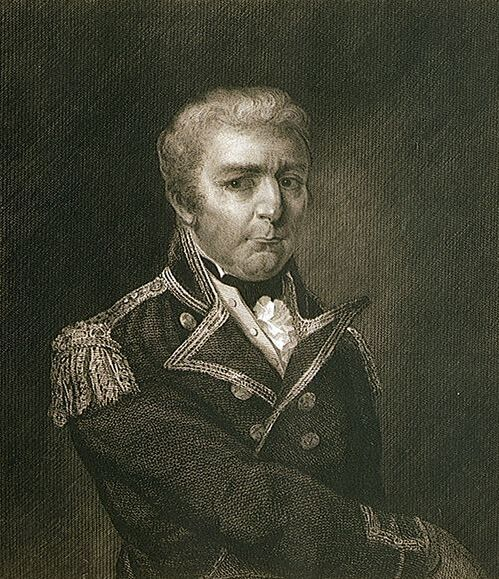
- 1803 portrait of Rotheram
- Born: 27 December 1753; Hexham, Northumberland
- Died: 6 November 1830 (aged 76); Bildeston, Suffolk
- Military career
- Allegiance: Great Britain; United Kingdom
- Branch: Royal Navy
- Service years: 1777–1808
- Rank: Captain
- Conflicts: American War of Independence; Battle of Martinique; Battle of Chesapeake; Battle of Saint Kitts; Battle of the Saintes; French Revolutionary Wars; Glorious First of June; Napoleonic Wars; Battle of Trafalgar
- Awards: Companion of the Order of the Bath

Captain Edward Rotheram, CB (27 December 1753 – 6 November 1830) was a Royal Navy officer who served in American War of Independence and French Revolutionary and Napoleonic Wars. During his service, Rotheram saw action at several major naval engagements, including the Glorious First of June in 1794 and the Battle of Trafalgar in 1805. Although he was highly praised for his actions at both battles, he was not well regarded in the service, being once described by his superior at Trafalgar, Cuthbert Collingwood, as "a man of no talent as a sea officer" and "a stupid man".

Rotheram gained a reputation as a difficult officer to serve with, and he rapidly alienated both his fellow officers and the sailors who served under him. Ultimately this resulted in his removal from service and being overlooked for promotion in 1808 after being court martialled for inappropriate behaviour towards junior officers. The rest of his life was spent requesting the Admiralty, often in an aggressive manner, for both further service and the rewards he felt were his due.

== Early career ==
Rotheram was born in 1753 at Hexham in Northumberland the son of Dr. John Rotheram, a local physician, and his wife Catherine Roberts. Rotheram was the second of the couple's seven children, his older brother being John Rotherham.

He was educated, with his brothers, at Head School in Newcastle-Upon-Tyne, where the family moved when Edward was seven. His elder brother John Rotheram was later a senior professor in natural philosophy at St Andrew's University. Edward Rotheram went to sea at a young age, joining a collier sailing from Newcastle and serving aboard merchant ships for several years. In 1777 however, Rotheram joined the Royal Navy as a midshipman during the American Revolutionary War.

Initially serving on HMS Centaur, Rotheram moved to HMS Barfleur in 1780 and HMS Monarch shortly afterwards as a lieutenant, serving under Lord Howe. Monarch was heavily engaged in the West Indian campaign during the latter stages of the war, and Rotheram saw action at the Battle of Martinique in 1780, the Battle of the Chesapeake in 1781 and the Battle of St Kitts and the Battle of the Saintes in 1782. Following the end of the war at the start of 1783, Rotheram returned to Britain as a reserve officer on half-pay.

== Lieutenant and commander ==
In 1785, Rotheram married Dorothy Harle of Newcastle, with whom he had three daughters. He returned to naval service in 1787 aboard HMS Bombay Castle and over the next four years moved between HMS Culloden and HMS Vengeance, all in the Channel Fleet. In 1792 Rotheram was made first lieutenant of HMS Culloden and was still in this position when the French Revolutionary War broke out a year later. Culloden was part of the Channel Fleet under Rotheram's old commander Lord Howe, and the ship was captained by Isaac Schomberg during the Atlantic campaign of May 1794, in which Howe pursued a French fleet deep into the Atlantic, bringing it to battle at the Glorious First of June.

Culloden was not closely engaged in the opening stages of the battle, for which Schomberg would later be heavily criticised. Rotheram, however, gained acclaim in the battle's aftermath by organising the Culloden's boats and the boats of other nearby ships into a rescue party that saved hundreds of French sailors from the sinking Vengeur du Peuple. In recognition for this operation, Rotheram was promoted commander on 6 July 1794 and given command of the storeship HMS Camel in the Mediterranean Fleet. In 1797 Rotheram moved to the sloop HMS Hawke, which he commanded in the West Indies until 1800, returning to Britain in 1800 aboard HMS Lapwing to be made a post captain.

Rotheram commanded Lapwing for the next two years, operating with the Channel Fleet and capturing several small French prizes. In 1802 Rotheram returned to reserve ashore during the Peace of Amiens. This retirement lasted until 1804, when Rotheram was recalled up to service as flag captain of HMS Dreadnought, a second rate ship of the line that flew the flag of Vice-Admiral Cuthbert Collingwood. Collingwood and Rotheram had a poor relationship, Collingwood commenting by letter to his brother that "He [Rotheram] is a man of no talent as a sea officer, and of little assistance to me." Nevertheless, when Collingwood moved to HMS Royal Sovereign in October 1805 as second-in-command of the fleet under Lord Nelson blockading the Franco-Spanish fleet in Cádiz, he brought Rotheram with him. Nelson was aware of the personal conflict between the men, and invited both Collingwood and Rotheram to dinner in a partially successful effort to reconcile them.

== Trafalgar ==
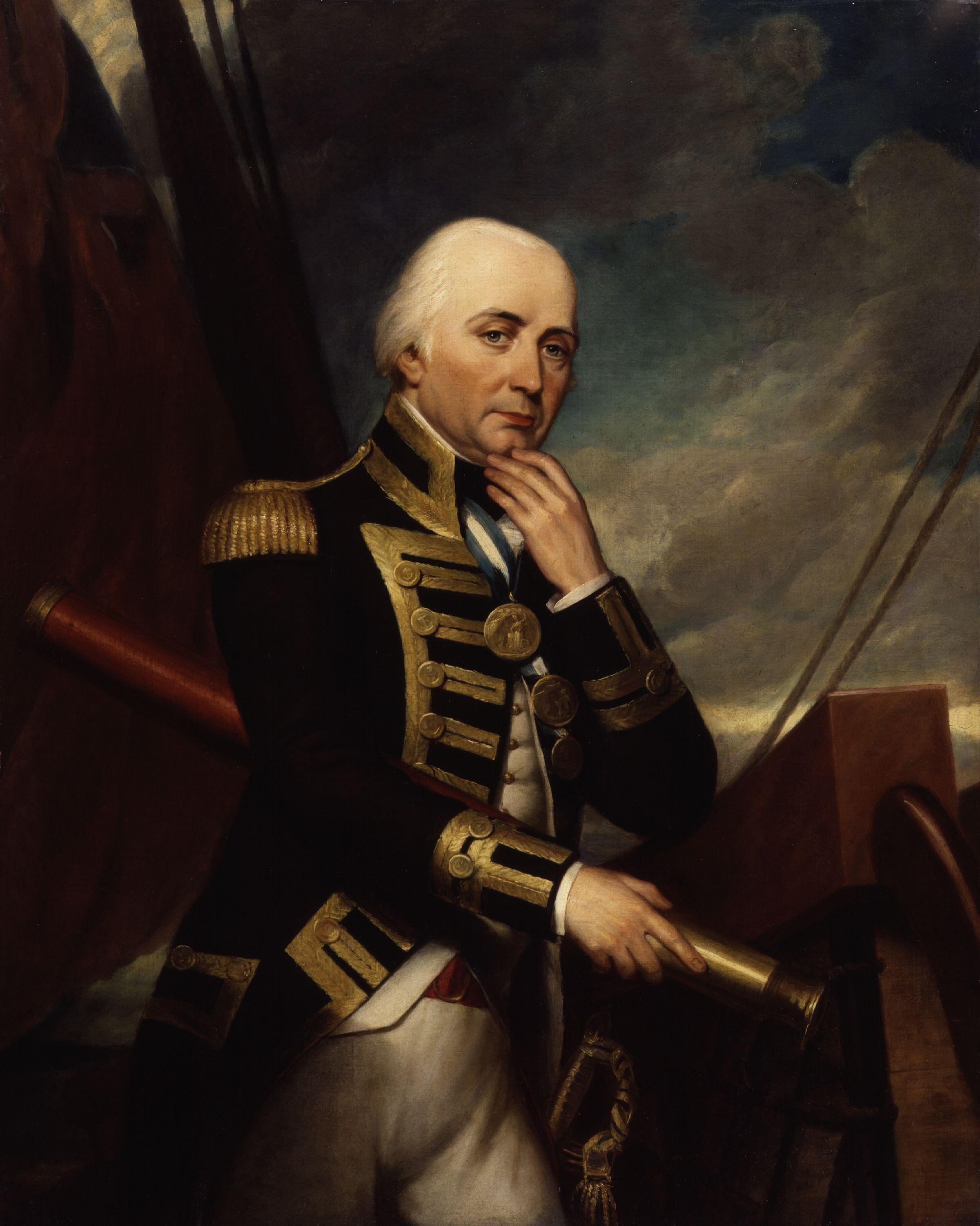
Admiral Collingwood, Rotheram's commander at Trafalgar, who considered his subordinate "stupid"

At the Battle of Trafalgar on 21 October 1805, Royal Sovereign was the first ship in Collingwood's division to breach the enemy lines, and Collingwood and Rotheram appear to have reconciled some of their differences as they cooperated well in handling the ship. Collingwood even called to his captain; "Rotheram, what would Nelson give to be here!", Nelson's HMS Victory being several minutes behind Royal Sovereign in engaging the enemy. Rotheram was also noted during the action for refusing to remove his full dress uniform and large cocked hat, apparel which was not only impractical in a naval engagement but which also marked him as a target for enemy snipers.

Royal Sovereign's main opponent was the large Spanish first rate Santa Ana, with whom she was engaged for several minutes at the start of the action without support. During this time, Royal Sovereign was at one point engaged with five different enemy ships, and suffered heavy damage and casualties during the engagement, finally subduing the 112-gun Santa Ana after a duel lasting several hours. Both ships were left unmanageable at the end of the engagement, Royal Sovereign being taken in tow by HMS Euryalus into which Collingwood transferred his flag. Royal Sovereign had suffered nearly 150 casualties, Santa Ana over 300 by the end of the battle. Santa Ana was later abandoned by her captors and ultimately fell back into Spanish hands, but Royal Sovereign reached the safety of Gibraltar soon after the battle.

In the aftermath of the action, Rotheram left Royal Sovereign to take command of HMS Bellerophon, whose captain, John Cooke had been killed by a French sniper. Cooke had been targeted due to the dress uniform he had worn during the battle. Bellerophon escorted Victory carrying Nelson's body back to Britain, and Rotheram carried the guidon behind the coffin at Nelson's funeral in London. Rotheram was presented with a gold medal and sword of honour in recognition of his services in the action, and continued in command of Bellerophon.

== Retirement ==
Rotheram remained in command of Bellerophon in the English Channel and the North Sea until 1808, when he was court martialled and reprimanded for unacceptable conduct towards his ship's junior officers and chaplain. Rotheram remained in the service, but was never again employed at sea. Collingwood summed the situation up in a letter to his sister, stating "Though I think him a stupid man I was in hope he might have gone on in the ship I put him in, which I believe was the only chance he had of being in a ship".

Although his career was over, Rotheram continued to request sea service and honours from the Admiralty, becoming increasingly irate and intemperate in his demands. At the reorganising of the knightly orders in 1815, a number of senior naval officers were given knighthoods, but Rotheram was only made a Companion of the Order of the Bath, a step below knighthood. He retired to Bildeston in Suffolk and from there continued to request appointments, finally being made one of the captains of the Greenwich Naval Hospital in 1828.

Rotheram died at Bildeston in 1830 and was buried in the churchyard of St Mary Magdelene just outside the village, where his grave and a memorial plaque are still legible today. Rotheram was never awarded any further honours or promoted to admiral, having lost his seniority in the court martial of 1808.
