= Utile (1784 ship) =

French and British naval vessel 1784-1798

History

France
- Name: Utile
- Builder: Raymond-Antoine Haran, Bayonne, to plans by de Boisseau
- Laid down: 1783
- Launched: April 1784
- Captured: June 1796
- Notes: Utile apparently was in Anglo-Spanish hands between August and December 1793 at Toulon

Great Britain
- Name: HMS Utile
- Acquired: June 1796 by capture
- Fate: Sold for breaking up 1798

General characteristics
- Type: Gabarre
- Displacement: 350 (unladen)/600 (laden) (French tons)
- Tons burthen: 478 (bm)
- Length: Overall: 112 ft 0 in (34.14 m); Keel: 102 ft 0 in (31.09 m)
- Beam: 27 ft 0 in (8.23 m)
- Draught: 10 ft 6 in (3.20 m) (unladen);12 ft 0 in (3.66 m) (laden)
- Depth of hold: 13 ft 6 in (4.11 m)
- Propulsion: Sails
- Complement: 80-120 (French service)
- Armament: 18-20 × 6-pounder guns + 2-6 swivel guns

Utile was a gabarre of the French Royal Navy, launched in 1784. The British captured her in the Mediterranean in 1796 and she served briefly there before being laid up in 1797 and sold in 1798.

== French service and capture ==
Utile was launched in early 1784 at Bayonne. She was built to plans by Jean-Joseph de Boissieu ad was the name-vessel of her two vessel class.

She was also designated a corvette or an aviso. In 1790 she was on the Levant station and under the command of lieutenant de vaisseau Gavoty.

In August 1793 an Anglo-Spanish force captured Toulon and Royalist forces turned over to them the French naval vessels in the port. When the Anglo-Spanish force had to leave in December, they took with them the best vessels and tried to burn the remainder. (Note: That said, like the French corvette Sardine, Utile does not appear on the list of vessels captured, burnt, or otherwise disposed of.)

In November and December 1794 she was at Toulon undergoing repairs and refitting. She was to be renamed Zibeline in 1795, but apparently she retained her original name.

In January and February 1796 she was under the command of enseigne de vaisseau Vezu and sailed between Toulon and Saint Florent via Livorno, transporting freed French and British prisoners.

Around midday of 9 June 1796, Admiral John Jervis, Commander-in-Chief of the British Fleet in the Mediterranean, called Captain James Macnamara of the frigate Southampton on board his ship Victory, and pointed out a French corvette that was working her way up among the Hyères islands. Jervis then directed Macnamara "to make a Dash at her". Macnamara immediately set out, sailing the Grande Passe, or passage between the islands of Porquerolles and Port-cros.

That evening Southampton captured Utile by boarding, with Lieutenant Charles Lydiard at the head of the boarding party. Utile was armed with twenty-four 6-pounder guns and was under the protection of a battery. She had a crew of 136 men under the command of Citizen François Veza. The French put up a resistance during which they suffered eight killed, including Veza, and 17 wounded; Southampton had one man killed. It was not until early the next morning that Southampton and Utile were finally able to get out of range of the guns of Fort de Brégançon.

Gorgon, Courageaux, and the hired armed cutter Fox were in company at the time, and with the British fleet outside Toulon. They shared with Southampton in the proceeds of the capture, as did Barfleur, Bombay Castle, Egmont, and St George.

== British service and fate ==
The Royal Navy took her into service as HMS Utile and commissioned her in July 1796 under Commander Lydiard, whose promotion was dated 22 July. Lydiard sailed her in the Adriatic as a convoy escort before returning to Britain in 1797.

Utile arrived in Portsmouth on 21 August 1797 and was laid up. She was immediately offered for sale, with the terms of sale including her copper sheathing and the proviso that the buyer post a bond of £2000 that he would break her up within a year. She was sold on 7 June 1798 at Portsmouth for £610.
