= French ship Foudroyant (1799) =

Ship of the line of the French Navy

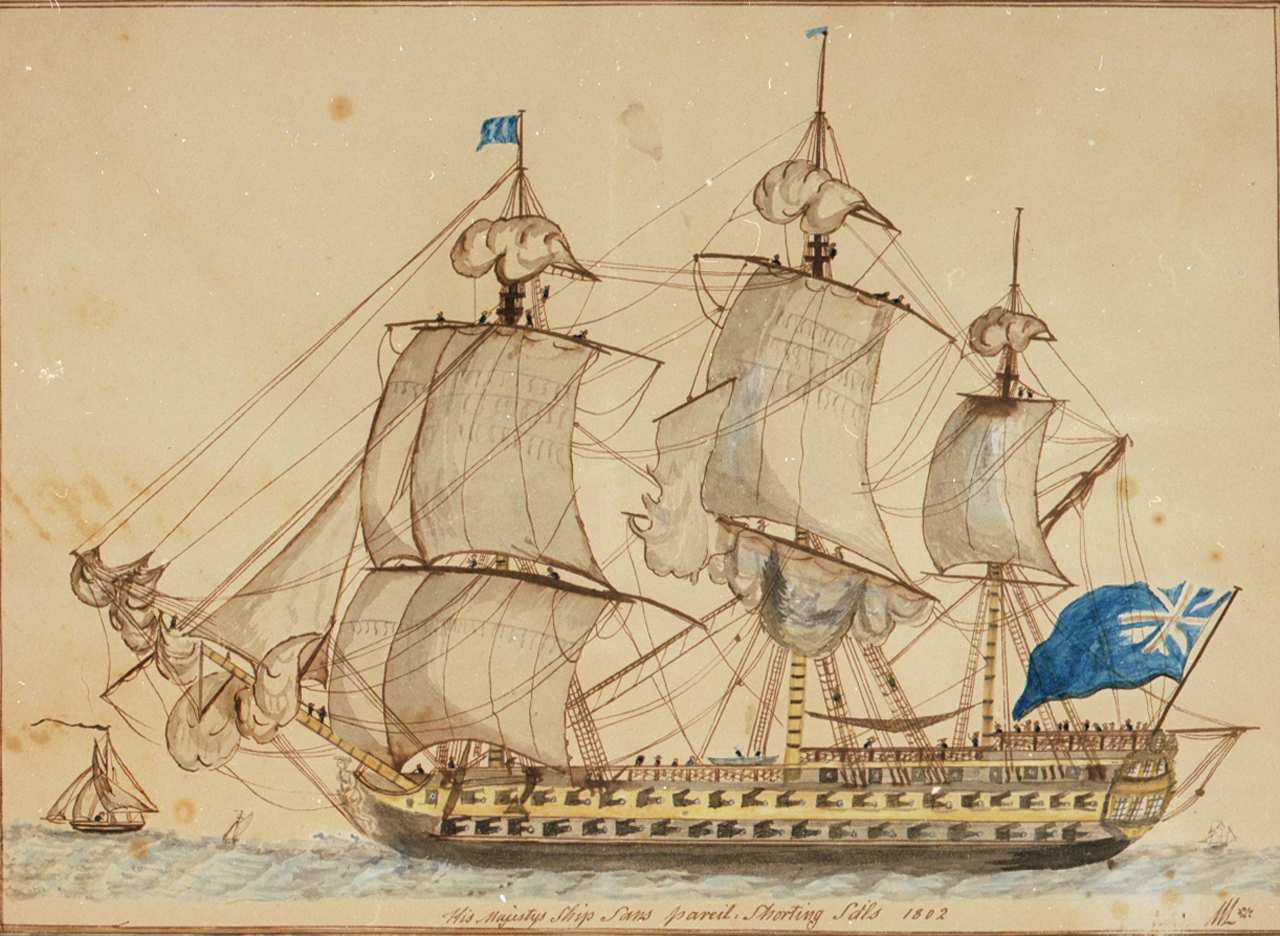
- Sans Pareil, Foudroyant's sister ship, in 1800

History

France
- Name: Foudroyant
- Namesake: Coup of 18 fructidor an V; "Lightning"
- Laid down: November 1793
- Launched: 18 May 1799
- Completed: August 1800
- Commissioned: 28 March 1801
- Renamed: Dix-huit fructidor in December 1797; restored to Foudroyant in February 1800
- Fate: Struck 26 October 1833; broken up in 1834

General characteristics
- Class & type: Tonnant-class ship of the line
- Displacement: 3,868 tonneaux
- Tons burthen: 2,034 port tonneaux
- Length: 59.28 m (194 ft 6 in)
- Beam: 15.27 m (50 ft 1 in)
- Draught: 7.8 m (25 ft 7 in)
- Depth of hold: 7.64 m (25 ft 1 in)
- Propulsion: Sail
- Complement: 866 in wartime; 626 in peacetime
- Armament: 80 guns; 30 36-pounder long guns; 32 24-pounder long guns; 18 12-pounder long guns; 4 obusiers de vaisseau
- Armour: Timber

The Foudroyant ("Lightning") was a Tonnant-class 80-gun ship of the line of the French Navy.

She was started in Rochefort from 1793, and renamed to Dix-huit fructidor in December 1797 in honour of the Jacobin Coup of 18 Fructidor, as she was still on the stocks, but reverted to Foudroyant in February 1800 before completion, after the Directory fell.

She took part in cruises in the Caribbean under Villaret de Joyeuse.

On 15 September 1806, while under jury rig some 15 miles (24 km) off Havana, she encountered HMS Anson, under Captain Charles Lydiard. Anson, mistakenly believing Foudroyant distressed, attacked, and was driven off.

She took part in the Battle of the Basque Roads, in which she was badly damaged but was later repaired.

She was eventually broken up in 1834.
