= HMS Swift (1793) =

Sloop of the Royal Navy

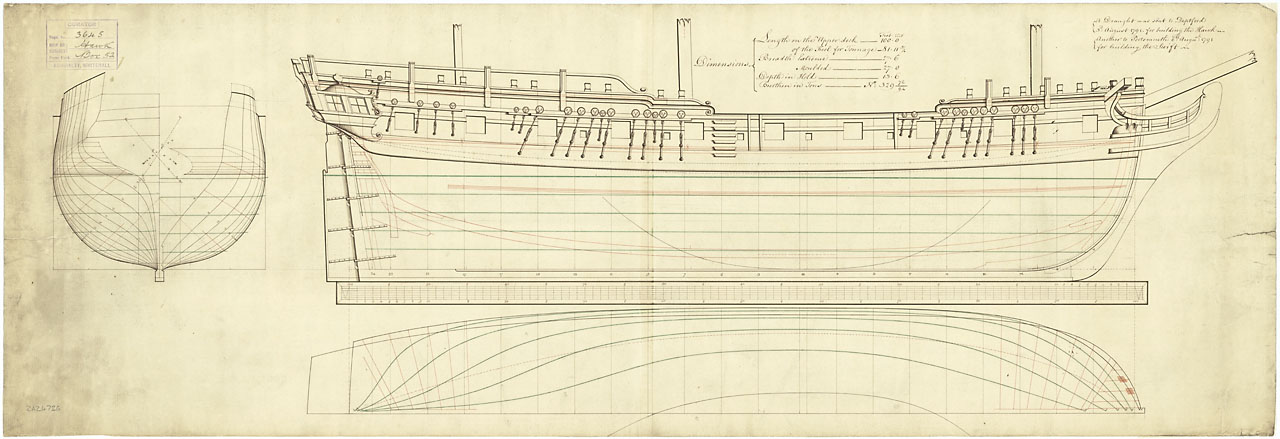
- Plan of Swift's sister ship HMS Hawk

History

Great Britain
- Name: Swift
- Ordered: 9 October 1790
- Builder: Edward Tippett, Portsmouth Dockyard
- Cost: £10,790
- Laid down: September 1791
- Launched: 5 October 1793
- Completed: 4 December 1793
- Commissioned: October 1793
- Fate: Lost, July 1797

General characteristics
- Class & type: Hawk-class ship-sloop
- Tons burthen: 33117/94 (bm)
- Length: 100 ft 1 1/2 in (30.5 m) (upper deck); 81 ft 11 1/2 in (25 m) (keel)
- Beam: 27 ft 6 3/4 in (8.4 m)
- Draught: 7 ft 11 in (2.4 m) (forward); 11 ft 6 in (3.5 m) (aft)
- Depth of hold: 13 ft 6 in (4.1 m)
- Propulsion: Sails
- Complement: 125
- Armament: 16 × 6-pounder guns; 14 × swivel guns

HMS Swift was a 16-gun Hawk-class ship-sloop of the Royal Navy. Commissioned in October 1793 for service in the French Revolutionary Wars, the ship joined the East Indies Station. There her main duties were escorting convoys and protecting trade. In early 1796 Swift formed part of the squadron that captured Ambon Island and Banda Neira in the Dutch East Indies.

Swift sailed from Macau as escort to a convoy of East Indiamen in July 1797, and between 2 and 3 July encountered a severe tropical cyclone. The ships were spread apart and damaged; Swift signalled that she was in distress and was not heard from again. The Royal Navy assumed that she had been lost with all hands in the storm.

== Design and construction ==
Swift was a 6-pounder Hawk-class ship-sloop. These were small three-masted, full-rigged ships that carried their main battery on the weather deck and encompassed both a quarterdeck and forecastle. They were very seaworthy, had a long range, and were better armed than the smaller brig-sloop, but were significantly slower. The ships were predominantly used for escorting convoys and making patrols.

The Hawk class of ship-sloop was designed by the Surveyor of the Navy, John Henslow. Two ships, Swift and the namesake HMS Hawk, were built to the design. Swift was ordered on 9 October 1790 to be built at Portsmouth Dockyard by the shipwright Edward Tippett. The ship was laid down in August 1791 and launched on 5 October 1793 with the following dimensions: 100 feet 1 1/2 inches (30.5 m) along the gun deck, 81 feet 11 1/2 inches (25 m) at the keel, with a beam of 27 feet 6 3/4 inches (8.4 m) and a depth in the hold of 13 feet 6 inches (4.1 m). Her draught was 7 feet 11 inches (2.4 m) forward and 11 feet 6 inches (3.5 m) aft, and the ship was calculated at 331 17/94 tons burthen.

The ship was completed on 4 December, having cost a total of £10,790 to construct. Swift was the eleventh Royal Navy warship to be named such. With a complement of 125, the ship was armed with sixteen 6-pounder long guns on her gun deck and fourteen swivel guns, which were usually placed on the quarterdeck. In 1794 the complement was decreased to 121, and subsequently the swivel guns were replaced by 12-pounder carronades, with four on the quarterdeck and two on the forecastle.

== Service ==
Swift was commissioned by Commander John Dolling about the time of her launching in October 1793. With the French Revolutionary Wars underway, the ship sailed to join the East Indies Station on 26 April 1794. Travelling alongside the 74-gun ship of the line HMS Suffolk, which was under the command of the new commander-in-chief for the East Indies, Commodore Peter Rainier, Swift acted as an escort to a convoy sailing with them, arriving at Madras on 11 September.

In March 1795 Swift and the 32-gun frigate HMS Orpheus sailed to Malacca to protect British trade travelling from China. Dolling was replaced in command of Swift by Commander Robert Lambert in about May. Operating as a convoy escort to three ships belonging to the Nawab of Arcot, sometime prior to 13 September the ship was damaged on an uncharted rock while leaving Jeddah.

Swift was sent in January 1796 alongside the 50-gun fourth-rate HMS Centurion to protect British trade in the China Seas. Commander John Spratt Rainier, a nephew of the station commander Rainier, replaced Lambert in command of Swift in about February. Under Commander Rainier Swift formed part of now-Admiral Rainier's squadron which operated against the Dutch East Indies; they arrived at Ambon Island on 16 February and captured it without resistance on the same day. From Ambon the squadron sailed to Banda Neira on 5 March, capturing it through a landing after brief resistance on 8 March.

Lieutenant Charles Adam was assigned to Swift as her acting captain in August. At Madras in March 1797 Adam was replaced in acting command by Lieutenant John Halsted. When he soon after went ashore to assume command of the Madras naval hospital, Swift was given to Commander Thomas Hayward.

Swift was ordered to sail from Trincomalee in April to convey news of the breaking out of war with Spain to Ambon Island and Macau. While off the Yangtze in May Swift encountered a ship's tender containing the crew of the 12-gun sloop HMS Providence, which had been wrecked while surveying off the southern coast of Japan. Forty of the men were taken on board Swift, while the rest were sent to an East Indiaman. On 15 June Swift departed Macau on her return journey to India, at the same time acting as escort to several East Indiamen. The Providence crewmembers remained on board her. Between 2 and 3 July the convoy was overtaken by several rough tropical cyclones at 19°04′N 124°18′E. The ships were quickly spread apart and many damaged. Swift was last seen signalling that she was in distress. It was assumed the ship had been lost with all hands, and the navy closed her records at the end of the month.
