= John Rotherham =

British physician and scientist

John Rotherham or Rotheram FSA Scot FRSE FLS (c.1750–1804) was an 18th-century British physician and scientist.

== Life ==
He was born around 1750 in Hexham in northern England, the son of Catherine Roberts and her husband Dr John Rotheram. He was the eldest brother of seven siblings, one of which was Edward Rotheram. He was educated at Newcastle Grammar School in part learning mathematics and physics from his father and Charles Hutton. He was then sent to Sweden to study medicine and sciences at the University of Uppsala under Carl Linnaeus and Prof Bergmann.

He returned to Newcastle in the 1760s and moved to Edinburgh around 1790. During his time in Newcastle he is presumed to have worked as a GP.

In 1792 he was elected a Fellow of the Royal Society of Edinburgh. His proposers were John Walker, James Hutton, Andrew Dalzell and Alexander Keith of Dunnottar.

In 1793 he obtained a position as a part-time lecturer in chemistry and assistant to Joseph Black at the University of Edinburgh. He lived nearby at West Nicholson Street in Edinburgh and practiced as a physician.

In 1795 he moved to the University of St Andrews to replace Prof Forrest as Professor of Natural Philosophy (Physics). Prof Forrest apparently "sold" his chair to Rotherham as Forrest was keen to retire. However, Rotherham was personally recommended for the position by Sir James Stirling, 1st Baronet, Lord Provost of Edinburgh. He also had letters of support from eminent figures such as John Hill and Dugald Stewart.

He died of apoplexy in St Andrews on 6 November 1804.

== Publications ==
- The Nature and Properties of Water (1770)
- Sexes of the Plants Vindicated (1790)
- Edinburgh New Dispensatory (1794)
