= HMS Southampton (1757) =

Frigate of the Royal Navy

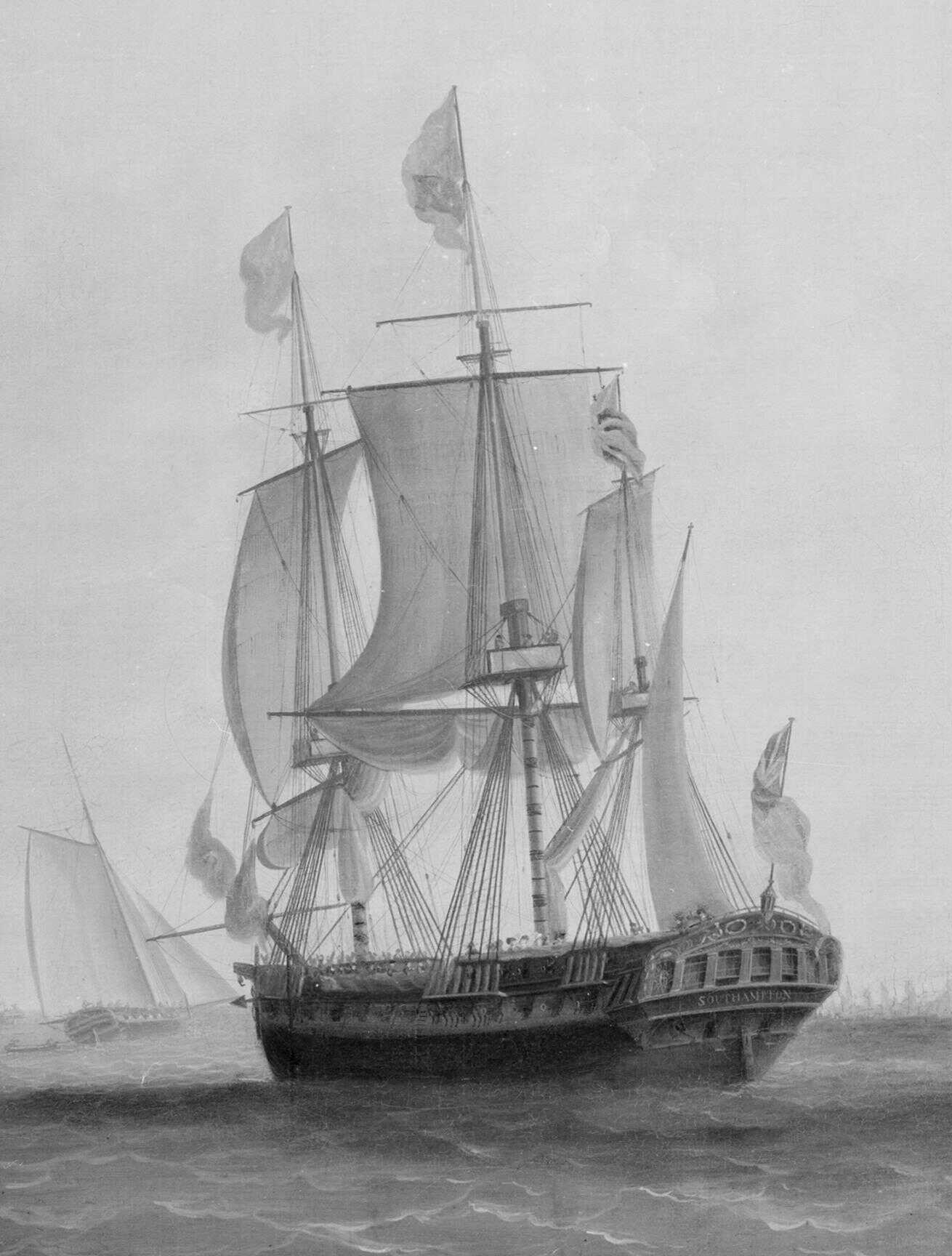
- HMS Southampton

History

Great Britain
- Name: HMS Southampton
- Ordered: 12 March 1756
- Builder: Robert Inwood, Rotherhithe
- Laid down: April 1756
- Launched: 5 May 1757
- Completed: 19 June 1757 at Deptford Dockyard
- Commissioned: April 1757
- Fate: Wrecked in the Bahamas, 27 November 1812

General characteristics
- Class & type: Southampton-class fifth-rate frigate
- Tons burthen: 67164/94 bm
- Length: 124 ft 4 in (37.90 m) (gundeck); 103 ft 1 in (31.42 m) (keel)
- Beam: 35 ft 0 in (10.67 m)
- Depth of hold: 12 ft 1 in (3.68 m)
- Sail plan: Full-rigged ship
- Complement: 210 officers and men
- Armament: Upperdeck: 26 × 12-pounder guns; QD: 4 × 6-pounder guns; Fc: 2 × 6-pounder guns

HMS Southampton was the name ship of the 32-gun Southampton-class fifth-rate frigates of the Royal Navy. She was launched in 1757 and served for more than half a century until wrecked in 1812.

== Career ==
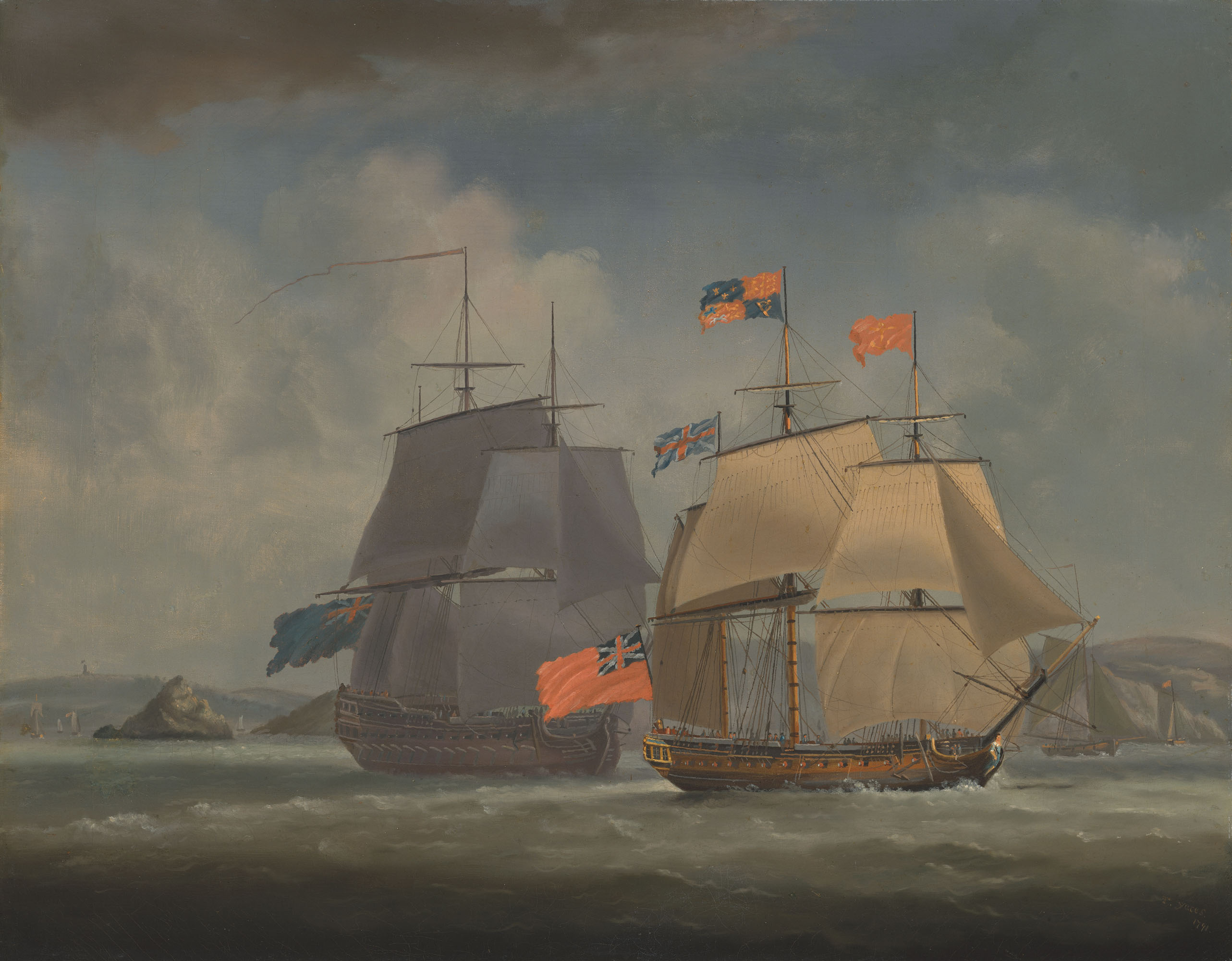
George III in HMS Southampton reviewing the fleet off Plymouth, 18 August 1789

In 1772, Southampton – at the time commanded by the capable John MacBride, destined for a distinguished naval career – was sent to Elsinore, Denmark, to take on board and convey to exile in Germany the British Princess Caroline Matilda, George III's sister, who had been deposed from her position as Queen of Denmark due to her affair with the social reformer Johan Struensee.

Sometime in 1777, under command of Will Garnier, she captured sloops Swift and Speedwell, schooners Sally, Tryall, and Hope, and one unknown. Before 18 October she captured another schooner Sally. Before 11 November she captured snow Washington. On 7 December she captured schooner Hazard. On 19 December she captured brig Lark. On 22 December she captured ship Speculation. On 17 January, 1778 she captured schooner Unity. She captured Brig Henry on unknown date. On 1 April, 1778 her tender captured sloop "John & Milsey" off Montie Christi.

On 3 August 1780, Southampton captured the French privateer lugger Comte de Maurepas, of 12 guns and 80 men, under the command of Joseph Le Cluck. She had on board Mr. Andrew Stuart, Surgeon's Mate of HMS Speedwell, "as a ransomer." Comte de Maurepas had suffered shot holes between wind and water and sank shortly thereafter. Southampton shared the head money award with Buffalo, Thetis, and Alarm.

Southampton took part in the action of 9 August 1780, when a convoy she was escorting fell prey to a Franco-Spanish squadron. 55 merchantmen were captured, but she managed to escape.

On 10 June 1796, Southampton captured the French corvette Utile at Hyères Roads, by boarding. Utile was armed with twenty-four 6-pounder guns and was under the protection of a battery. She had a crew of 136 men under the command of Citizen François Veza. The French put up a resistance during which they suffered eight killed, including Veza, and 17 wounded; Southampton had one man killed. The Royal Navy took her into service as HMS Utile. Gorgon, Courageux, and the hired armed cutter Fox were in company at the time, and with the British fleet outside Toulon. They shared with Southampton in the proceeds of the capture, as did Barfleur, Bombay Castle, Egmont, and St George.

On 2 December 1796 Southampton encountered the Spanish naval brig El Corso off Monaco as El Corso was on her way from Genoa to Barcelona. Southampton captured El Corso by boarding. She was armed with eighteen 6-pounder guns and had a crew of 136 men under the command of Don Antonio Oacaro. The Royal Navy took the brig into service as HMS Corso.

In September 1789 Richard Goodwin Keats was appointed her captain. She was engaged on two cruises of observation in the chops of the Channel and a voyage to Gibraltar conveying Prince Edward to his new command. Southampton was readied as part of Lord Howe's fleet to respond to the Nootka sound incident, but was not required to put to sea. Keats had written to the Admiralty concerned at the state of his new command, which had not been in the docks for three years, during which she had grounded several times, and in 1790 she was paid off.

On 2 September, 1800 she made contact with USS Philadelphia in the West Indies. Mid January, 1801 she was at Basseterre, St. Christophers.

Lloyd's List reported that Southampton and the sloop-of-war HMS Brazen had run aground and lost their masts on the coast of Mississippi during a great hurricane on 19 and 20 August 1812, but that the crews were saved. Both vessels were refloated, repaired, and returned to service. Brazen arrived at New Providence; Southampton arrived at Jamaica on 6 October. Although neither vessel was lost in the hurricane, Southampton was lost about a month later when she hit an uncharted rock.

On 22 November, Southampton, under the command of Captain James Lucas Yeo, captured the American brig USS Vixen. Vixen was armed with twelve 18-pounder carronades and two 9-pounder bow chasers, and had a crew of 130 men under the command of Captain George Reed. She had been out five weeks but had not captured anything.

== Fate ==
A strong westerly current wrecked Southampton and Vixen on an uncharted submerged reef off Conception Island in the Crooked Island Passage of the Bahamas on 27 November. There were no deaths.
