= HMS Hawk (1793) =

Sloop of the Royal Navy

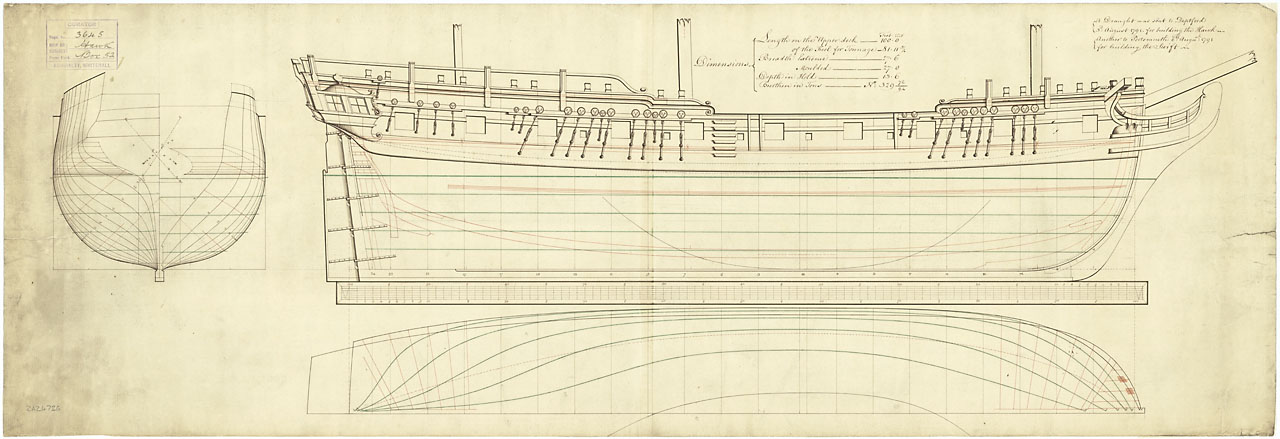
- Lines of Hawk

History

Great Britain
- Name: Hawk
- Ordered: 9 October 1790
- Builder: Martin Ware, Deptford Dockyard
- Laid down: September 1791
- Launched: 24 July 1793
- Completed: 17 September 1793
- Commissioned: August 1793
- Fate: Broken up, May 1803

General characteristics
- Class & type: Hawk-class ship-sloop
- Tons burthen: 33277/94 (bm)
- Length: 100 ft (30.5 m) (upper deck); 82 ft 2 7/8 in (25.1 m) (keel)
- Beam: 27 ft 7 in (8.4 m)
- Depth of hold: 13 ft 6 in (4.1 m)
- Propulsion: Sails
- Complement: 125
- Armament: 16 × 6-pounder guns; 14 × swivel guns

HMS Hawk was a 16-gun Hawk-class ship-sloop of the Royal Navy. Commissioned in August 1793 for service in the French Revolutionary Wars, Hawk was initially employed escorting convoys, travelling to the West Indies. After some service with the North Sea Fleet, the ship was transferred to the Leeward Islands Station in 1798. There she captured several small French and Spanish privateers and completed a survey of the coast of Trinidad. Out of service when the Treaty of Amiens ended the war, Hawk was broken up in May 1803.

== Design and construction ==
Hawk was a 6-pounder, Hawk-class ship-sloop. These were small three-masted, full-rigged ships that carried their main battery on the weather deck and encompassed both a quarterdeck and forecastle. They were very seaworthy, had a long range, and were better armed than the smaller brig-sloop, but were significantly slower. The ships were predominantly used for escorting convoys and making patrols.

The Hawk class of ship-sloop, being Hawk and Swift, was designed by the Surveyor of the Navy, John Henslow. Hawk was ordered on 9 October 1790 to be built at Deptford Dockyard by the shipwright Martin Ware. The ship was laid down in September 1791 and launched on 24 July 1793. She had the following dimensions: 100 feet (30.5 m) along the gun deck, 82 feet 2 7/8 inches (25.1 m) at the keel, with a beam of 27 feet 7 inches (8.4 m) and a depth in the hold of 13 feet 6 inches (4.1 m). The ship was calculated at 332 77/94 tons burthen.

The ship was completed on 17 September. With a complement of 125, the ship was armed with sixteen 6-pounder long guns on her gun deck and fourteen swivel guns, which were usually placed on the quarterdeck. In 1794 the complement was decreased to 121, and subsequently the swivel guns were replaced by 12-pounder carronades, with four on the quarterdeck and two on the forecastle.

== Service ==
Hawk was commissioned by Commander Robert Barton in August 1793. With the French Revolutionary Wars underway, one of her first duties was to escort a convoy of merchant ships to the West Indies. Having returned to Britain, in April 1794 Barton was promoted and replaced in command of Hawk by Commander George Bowen. She was employed escorting convoys and making patrols. Hawk also spent some time serving in the naval escort to Caroline of Brunswick, who was conveyed from Cuxhaven to Britain in a squadron commanded by Commodore John Willett Payne in March.

Commander Bernard Hale replaced Bowen in Hawk in c. June 1795, continuing to patrol and escort convoys. This included escorting a convoy to Elsinore, sailing from Leith Roads on 14 September 1796 and returning on 6 October. She was under the command of Commander Edward Rotheram from February 1797 as part of the North Sea Fleet. Hawk was transferred to the Leeward Islands Station in January 1798. While sailing off Grenada on 15 March, she captured the 2-gun French privateer Furet. On 8 July Hawk captured the 4-gun French privateer Mahomet off St Lucia. Hawk continued patrolling the Leeward Islands into 1799, and in c. July captured a 6-gun Spanish privateer brig as it was sailing from Málaga to Veracruz. Rotheram left Hawk in June 1800 and was replaced by Commander John Garnier in August, with the ship now serving on the Jamaica Station. In c. November Hawk briefly imprisoned the traveller Alexander von Humboldt.

When Rear-Admiral of the White John Duckworth used his fleet to force the surrender of the Swedish colony of Saint Barthélemy in March 1801, he promoted Garnier and replaced him in Hawk with Lieutenant George Blamey, who took acting command in October. Under Blamey Hawk subsequently spent a week surveying Trinidad, circumnavigating the island, taking soundings and making sketches for the Hydrographical Office. When the Treaty of Amiens brought the war to an end in 1802, the ship returned to Britain and Blamey relinquished command. Hawk was broken up at Deptford in May 1803.
