= HMS Anson (1781) =

Intrepid-class ship of the line

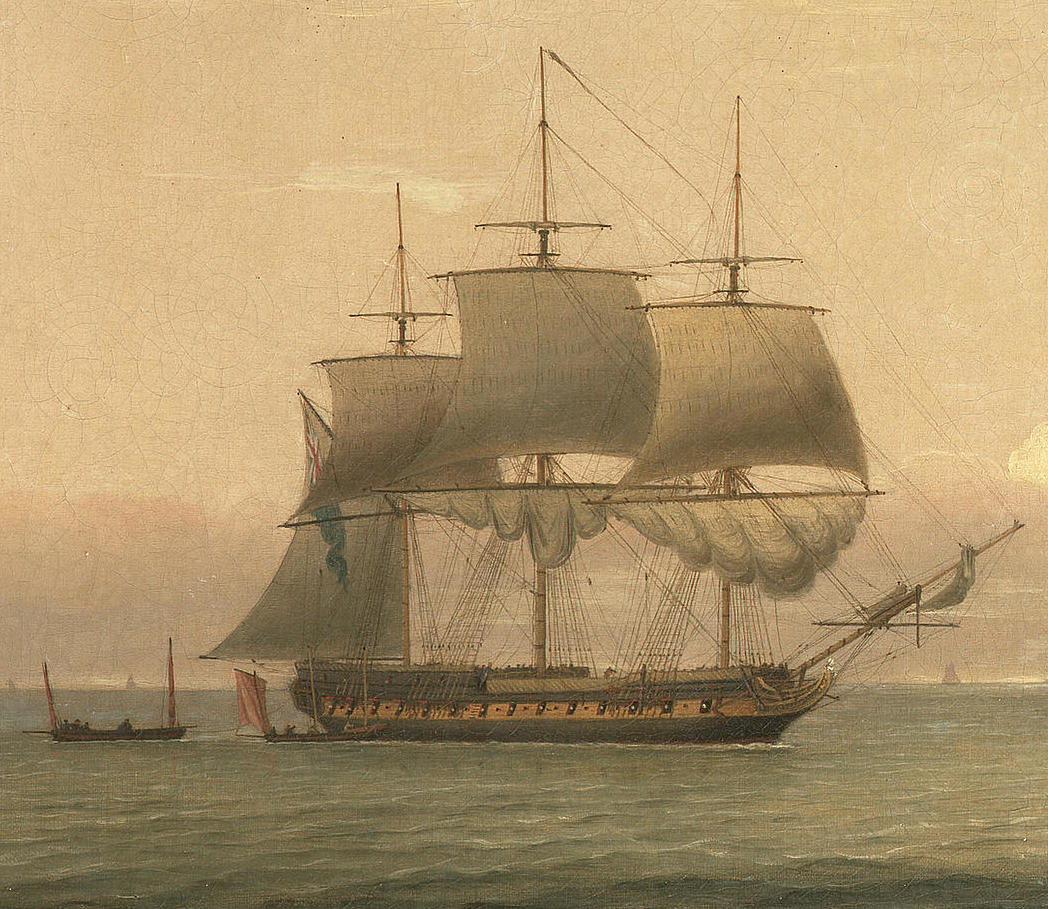
- Painting of Anson by Thomas Luny

History

Great Britain
- Name: HMS Anson
- Ordered: 24 April 1773
- Builder: Plymouth Dockyard
- Laid down: January 1774
- Launched: 4 September 1781
- Honours and awards: Participated in: Battle of the Saintes
- Fate: Wrecked, 29 December 1807

General characteristics
- Class & type: Intrepid-class ship of the line
- Tons burthen: 1369 bm
- Length: 159 ft 6 in (48.62 m) (gundeck)
- Beam: 44 ft 4 in (13.51 m)
- Depth of hold: 19 ft (5.8 m)
- Propulsion: Sails
- Sail plan: Full-rigged ship
- Complement: 500 (as 64-gun ship); 310 officers and men (as frigate)
- Armament: 64 guns: Gundeck: 26 × 24-pounder guns; Upper gundeck: 26 × 18-pounder guns; QD: 10 × 4-pounder guns; Fc: 2 × 9-pounder guns; 44 guns: Gundeck: 26 × 24-pounder guns; QD: 8 × 12-pounder guns; 4 × 42-pounder carronades; Fc: 2 × 12-pounder guns; 2 × 42-pounder carronades

HMS Anson was a ship of the Royal Navy, launched at Plymouth on 4 September 1781. Originally a 64-gun third rate ship of the line, she fought at the Battle of the Saintes.

In 1794 she was razeed to produce a frigate of 44 guns (fifth rate). Stronger than the average frigate of the time, the razee frigate Anson subsequently had a successful career during the French Revolutionary Wars and Napoleonic Wars, mostly operating against privateers, but also in small actions against enemy frigates.

Anson was wrecked on 29 December 1807. Trapped by a lee shore off Loe Bar, Cornwall, England, she hit the rocks and between 60 and 190 men were killed. The subsequent treatment of the recovered bodies of drowned seamen caused controversy, and led to the Burial of Drowned Persons Act 1808.

== Design and construction ==
The ship was ordered on 24 April 1773 as an Intrepid-class ship of the line of 64 guns. The lead ship of the class, HMS Intrepid, had entered service in 1771 and proved satisfactory in sea trials, so the Royal Navy increased their order from four to fifteen ships. Anson was part of the expanded order, named after George Anson, 1st Baron Anson, the victorious admiral of the First Battle of Cape Finisterre (1747).

Anson was launched on 4 September 1781 by Georgina, Duchess of Devonshire. She was completed and entered service on 15 October 1781.

The Intrepid-class design had been originally approved in 1765, so by the time Anson was launched it was over 15 years old. During that period, the design of ships-of-the-line had evolved, with the standard size and layout now being the seventy-four. Anson was therefore rather small and less solidly built than most of her contemporaries.

== Battle of the Saintes ==
Anson fought at the battle of Les Saintes on 12 April 1782 under the flag of Admiral Sir George Rodney against Admiral de Grasse. She was in the rear division, which was under the command of Rear-Admiral Francis Samuel Drake. In this engagement, Captain William Blair was one of the two Royal Navy post captains killed. Blair was struck at waist level by a French cannonball and sliced in two. In all Anson lost three men killed and 13 men wounded.

== Conversion to a frigate ==
At the start of the French Revolutionary Wars, 64-gun ships of the line were no longer being built and were considered obsolete. They were outclassed by the standard 74-gun ships of the line which would come to dominate the major fleet actions of the age. In early 1794 the Royal Navy decided to razee four 64 gun ships to 44 gun heavy frigates in order to counter a small number of large 24-pounder frigates rumored to be building in France. Only three 64's were selected for conversion, of which Anson was one. A razee is the cutting down of a larger ship of the line by removing the uppermost deck (and its armament) to produce a large frigate. The subsequent razee frigate was more heavily armed and had much thicker planking than a typical purpose-built frigate. They also tended to be slower.

Anson was chosen for this process and in 1794 the ship was razeed. The original forecastle and quarterdeck were removed, and the former upper deck (now weather or spar-deck) was partially removed and restructured to provide a new forecastle and quarterdeck. The result was a frigate of 44 guns, with a primary gun deck armament of twenty-six 24-pounder cannon (most frigates of the time were too lightly built to handle such heavy guns, so were armed with 18-pounders). The new quarterdeck and forecastle also allowed the armaments stationed there to be substantially strengthened from the original design, including adding carronades. Anson was thus heavily armed for a frigate, and retained the stronger construction (and ability to absorb damage) of a ship-of-the-line.

== French Revolutionary Wars ==
At the action of 16 July 1797, Anson and Sylph drove the French corvette Calliope on shore, where Sylph proceeded to fire on her. When Pomone checked a week later, Calliope was wrecked; her crew were camped on shore trying to salvage what stores they could. Pomone confirmed that the flute Freedom and a brig that had also been driven ashore too were wrecked.

Leviathan, Anson, Pompee, Melpomene, and Childers shared in the proceeds of the capture on 10 September 1797 of Tordenskiold.

On 29 December 1797 Anson recaptured Daphne, which the French had captured three years earlier in December 1794 and taken into service under her existing name. Daphné was under the command of lieutenant de vaisseau Latreyte and transiting between Lorient and Bordeaux on her way to Guadeloupe when Anson captured her at the mouth of the Gironde. Anson fired several shots before Daphne struck. She was armed with 30 guns and had 276 men aboard, including 30 passengers. Two of the passengers were Civil Commissioners Jaiquelin and La Carze, who succeeded in throwing their dispatches for Guadeloupe overboard. Daphne had five men killed and several wounded.

On 7 September 1798, after a 24-hour long chase, Anson and Phaeton captured Flore. Captain Stopford, of Phaeton, in his letter described Flore as a frigate of 36 guns and 255 men. She was eight days out of Boulogne on a cruise. She had also served the Royal Navy in the American Revolutionary War.

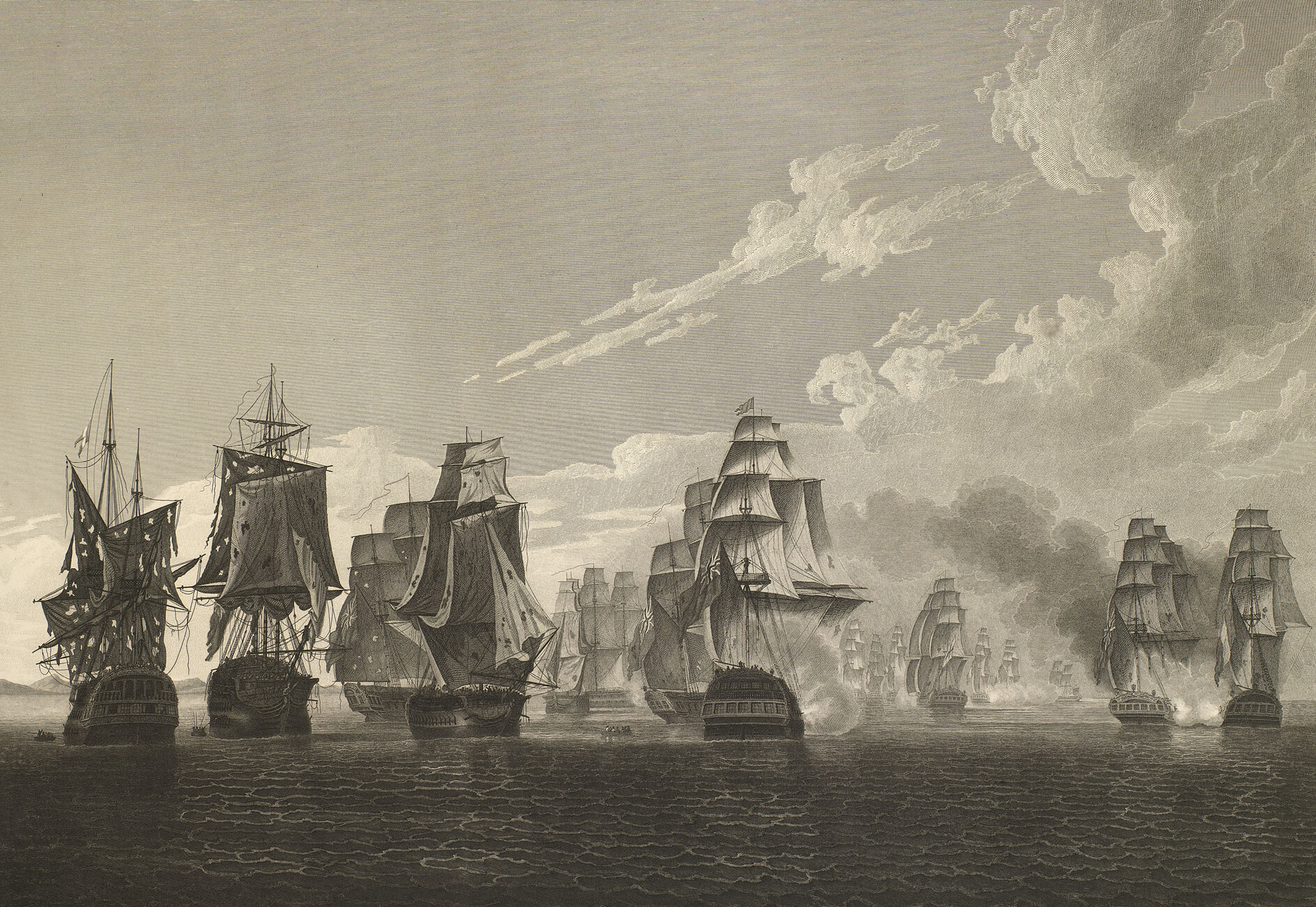
Anson at the Battle of Tory Island

Anson was unable to take part in the Battle of Tory Island on 12 October 1798, because she had sustained damage during poor weather and was unable to keep up with the rest of the British squadron. In the aftermath of the original engagement, on 18 October she joined the brig HMS Kangaroo and fought a separate action, capturing the damaged French frigate Loire. Anson was then under the command of Captain Philip Charles Durham, who struggled to manoeuvre his ship after having lost her mizzen mast, main lower and topsail yards during the earlier pursuit.

Anson sailed from Plymouth on 26 January 1799, and on 2 February, in company with Ethalion, captured the French privateer cutter Boulonaise. Boulonaise, of Dunkirk, was armed with 14 guns and had been preying on shipping in the North Sea.

On 9 September 1799 Captain Durham hosted a fête for King George III. During the course of the evening, the king was found on the lower deck surrounded by the ship's company and talking to an old sailor.

On 10 April 1800, when north-west of the Canary Islands, Anson detained Catherine & Anna bound for Hamburg, Holy Roman Empire, from Batavia with a cargo of coffee.

On 27 April Anson captured the letter of marque brig Vainquer. Vainquer was pierced for 16 guns but only mounted four. When captured she had been on her way from Bordeaux to San Domingo with a cargo of merchandise.

Two days later, at daybreak, Anson encountered four French privateers: Brave (36 guns), Guepe (18), Hardi (18), and Duide (16). As soon as the French vessels realized that Anson was a British frigate they scattered. As Anson passed Brave going in the opposite direction Anson fired a broadside into her; Durham believed that the broadside did considerable damage, but he was unable to follow up as Brave had the wind in her favour and so outsailed Anson. Durham then set off after one of the other French vessels, which he was able to capture. She was Hardi, of 18 guns and 194 men. Durham described her as "a very fine new Ship just of the Stocks." The Royal Navy took Hardi into service, first as HMS Hardi, before shortly thereafter renaming her HMS Rosario. Lastly, Durham reported sending into port for adjudication a very valuable ship that had been sailing from Batavia to Hamburg with the Governor of Batavia as passenger. (This may have been Catherine & Anna.)

On 27 June Anson and Constance came across some 40 or 50 Spanish merchant vessels on the Straits of Gibraltar. They were protected by some 25 gunboats. Two row boats came out from Gibraltar to assist Anson and the British were able to capture eight Spanish merchantmen, though the Spanish recaptured one.

These included:

- The mistico Jesus & Aminas, from Algeziras to Gibraltar and Barcelona, carrying 125 bags of sumac, ten chests of liquorice, and 250 bundles of wooden hoops.
- The felucca Virgen de Boyar, from Malaga to Cadiz, carrying five pipes of red wine and 300 bundles of "boss".
- The "lland" Virgen del Socous, from Malaga to Cadiz, carrying 61 casks of pitch and 60 casks and 13 chests of tar.
- The tartan Nostra Signora del Rosario, from Barcelona to Vera Cruz, carrying paper, brandy, oil, and cotton.
- The lland Saint Francisco de Paulo, carrying wine.
- The mistico San Antonio, alias El Vigilante, coming to Gibraltar, carrying 60 quarter-casks of wine and 313 quintals of barilla.
- The mistico San Joseph y Aminas, carrying 250 deal boards 4' long, 600 deal boards 4'10" long, 20 water jars, and 30 "alcarasses", with the assistance of the privateer Felicity.
- The lland Saint Francisco de Paulo, carrying wine, was cut out from the prizes in sight of Anson and Constance.

On 29 June Anson and Constance captured two privateer misticos: Gibraltar and Severo (or Severino). Gibraltar was armed with four guns and had a crew of 50 men. Severo was armed with two guns and ten swivel guns, and had a crew of 26 men. (Note: A later prize money notice suggests that this capture and the one below are actually the same, and actually refer to the gunboats Cervero and Trois Hermanos.)

On 30 June Anson cut off two Spanish gun boats that had been annoying the convoy she was escorting. The two proved to be Gibraltar and Salvador. They each mounted two 18–pounder guns in their bow, and each had eight guns of different dimensions on their sides. They were each manned by 60 men and probably sustained heavy casualties in resisting Anson.

In 1801 Captain W. E. Cacraft assumed command and Anson joined the Channel station, cruising from Portsmouth. In 1802 she was in the Mediterranean, and in November she sailed from Malta for Egypt. She was at Syracuse 20 February 1804. Arrived at Malta on 21 October 1804. She went in for repairs in 1805 at Portsmouth.

== Napoleonic Wars ==
In December 1805 Captain Charles Lydiard was appointed to command Anson. She was driven ashore in a gale at Portsmouth on 16 January 1806, but was refloated later the same day, undamaged. Under Lydiard's command, Anson sailed to the West Indies in early 1806.

=== Action of 23 August 1806 ===
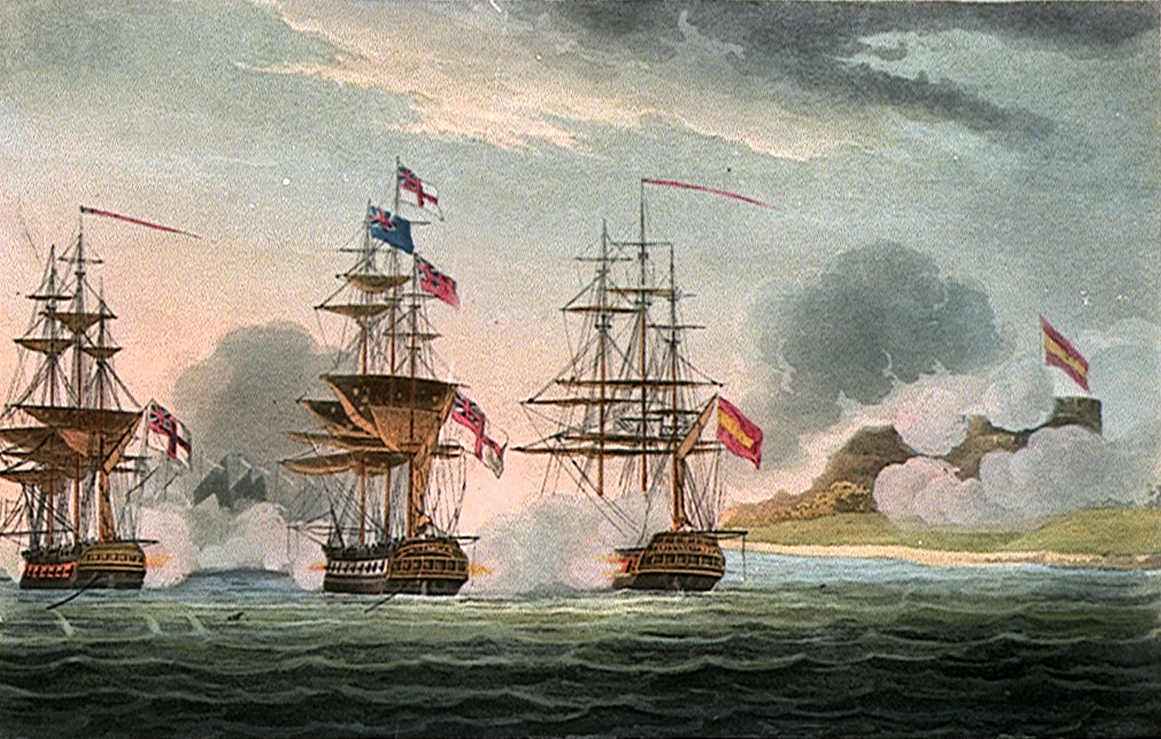
HMS Arethusa and HMS Anson capture the Pomona off Havana, depicted by Thomas Whitcombe

On 23 August while sailing in company with Captain Charles Brisbane's HMS Arethusa when they came across the 38-gun Spanish frigate Pomona off Havana, guarded by a shore battery and twelve gunboats. Pomona was trying to enter the harbour, whereupon Lydiard and Brisbane bore up and engaged her. The gunboats came out to defend her, whereupon the two British frigates anchored between the shore battery and gunboats on one side, and Pomona on the other. A hard-fought action began, which lasted for 35 minutes until Pomona struck her colours. Three of the gunboats were blown up, six were sunk, and the remaining three were badly damaged. The shore battery was obliged to stop firing after an explosion in one part of it. There were no casualties aboard Anson, but Arethusa lost two killed and 32 wounded, with Brisbane among the latter. The captured Pomona was subsequently taken into the Navy as HMS Cuba.

=== Anson and Foudroyant ===
Anson remained cruising off Havana, and on 15 September sighted the French 84-gun Foudroyant. Foudroyant, carrying the flag of Vice-Admiral Jean-Baptiste Willaumez, had been dismasted in a storm and was carrying a jury-rig. Despite the superiority of his opponent and the nearness of the shore Lydiard attempted to close on the French vessel and opened fire. Anson came under fire from the fortifications at Morro Castle, while several Spanish ships, including the 74-gun San Lorenzo, came out of Havana to assist the French. After being unable to manoeuvre into a favourable position and coming under heavy fire, Lydiard hauled away and made his escape. Anson had two killed and 13 wounded during the engagement, while its sails and rigging had been badly damaged. Foudroyant meanwhile had 27 killed or wounded.

=== Capture of Curaçao ===
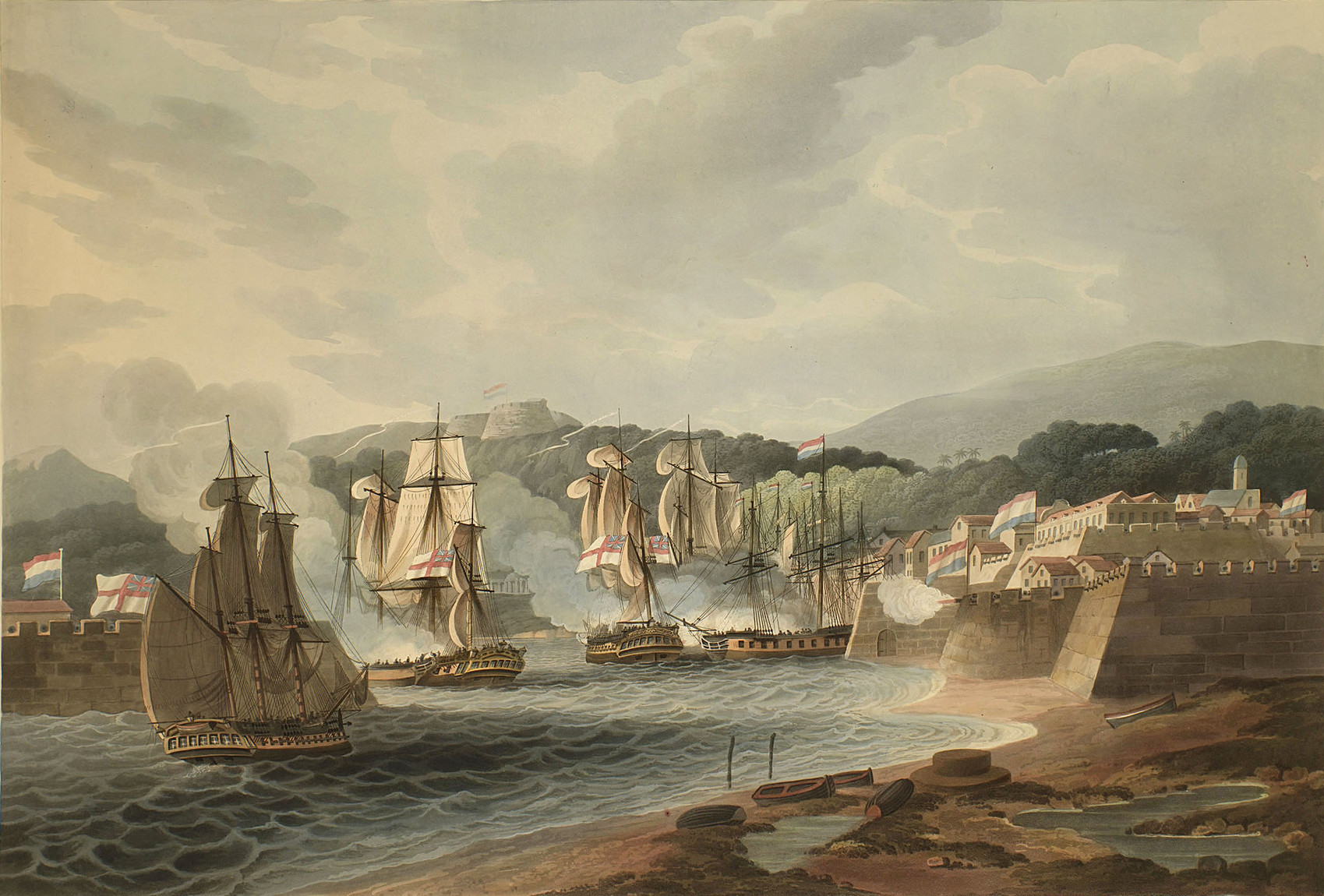
The British capture of Curaçao in 1807

Anson was then assigned to Charles Brisbane's squadron and joined Brisbane's Arethusa and James Athol Wood's HMS Latona.

The ships were despatched in November 1806 by Vice-Admiral James Richard Dacres to reconnoitre Curaçao. They were joined in December by HMS Fisgard and Brisbane decided to launch an attack. The British ships approached early in the morning of 1 January 1807 and anchored in the harbour. They were attacked by the Dutch, at which Brisbane boarded and captured the 36-gun frigate Halstaar, while Lydiard attacked and secured the 20-gun corvette Suriname. Both Lydiard and Brisbane then led their forces on shore, and stormed Fort Amsterdam, which was defended by 270 Dutch troops. The fort was carried after ten minutes of fighting, after which two smaller forts, a citadel and the entire town were also taken. More troops were landed while the ships sailed round the harbour to attack Fort République. By 10 am the fort had surrendered, and by noon the entire island had capitulated.

Anson had seven men wounded. In all, the British lost three killed and 14 wounded. On the ships alone, the Dutch lost six men killed, including Commandant Cornelius J. Evertz, who commanded the Dutch naval force in Curaçao, and seven wounded, of whom one died later. With the colony, the British captured the frigate Kenau Hasselar, the sloop Suriname (a former Royal Naval sloop), and two naval schooners.

Anson was sent back to Britain carrying the despatches and captured colours. The dramatic success of the small British force carrying the heavily defended island was rewarded handsomely. Brisbane was knighted, and the captains received swords, medals and vases.

In 1847 the Admiralty authorised the issue of the Naval General Service Medal with clasp "Curacoa 1 Jany. 1807" to any surviving claimants from the action; 65 medals were issued.

== Wreck ==
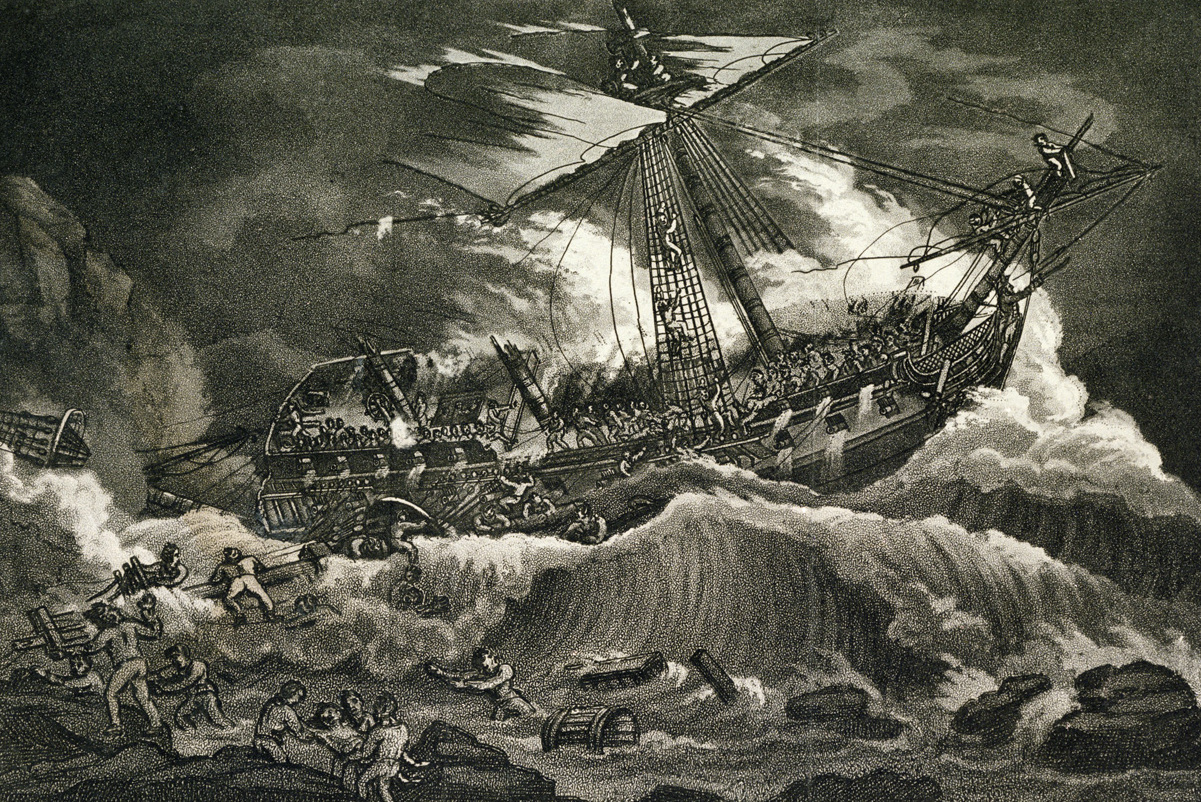
'Loss of the Anson Frigate, off Cornwall', in an 1808 depiction by William Elmes

After a period refitting in Britain Anson was assigned to the Channel Fleet and ordered to support the blockade of Brest by patrolling off Black Rocks. She sailed from Falmouth on 24 December, and reached Ile de Bas on 28 December 1807. With a severe storm developing from the south west, Lydiard decided to return to port. He made for the Lizard, but in the poor weather, came up on the wrong side and became trapped on a lee shore off Mount's Bay near Penzance, in Cornwall with breakers ahead and insufficient room to sail out to the open seas. Anson rolled heavily in rough seas, having retained the spars from her days as a 64-gun ship after she had been razeed. Lydiard's only option was to anchor off Loe Bar. The storm caused the first anchor cable to snap at 4 am on the morning of 29 December. Anson's smaller anchor cable broke at 7 am and she was soon being driven onto the shore. With no anchors, Lydiard, in the hope of saving as many lives as possible, attempted to beach her on what he thought was a suitable beach. It was only upon impact that he discovered that it was a sandbar that covered rocks dividing Loe Pool from the open sea. The wind and waves caused the ship to roll broadside on and her mainmast snapped. a sheet anchor was let out, which righted the ship only before it snapped at 8 am.

As hundreds of spectators watched from nearby settlements the pounding surf prevented boats from being launched from the ship or the shore, and a number of the crew were swept away. Some managed to clamber along the fallen main-mast to the shore. Captain Lydiard remained aboard to oversee the evacuation. About 2 pm the ship began to break up, which allowed a few more men to emerge from the wreck, with one being saved. By 3 pm no trace of the ship remained.

Survivors were taken to Helston, two miles away and later sent on to Falmouth.

Estimates of the number of lives lost vary from sixty to 190. Captain Lydiard and Anson's first-lieutenant was among the casualties; Lydiard's body was recovered on 1 January 1808 and taken to Falmouth for burial with full military honours. Most of the other victims were buried in pits dug on unconsecrated ground on the cliffs with no burial rites. The death toll is uncertain as some of the survivors had been press ganged and took the opportunity to desert.

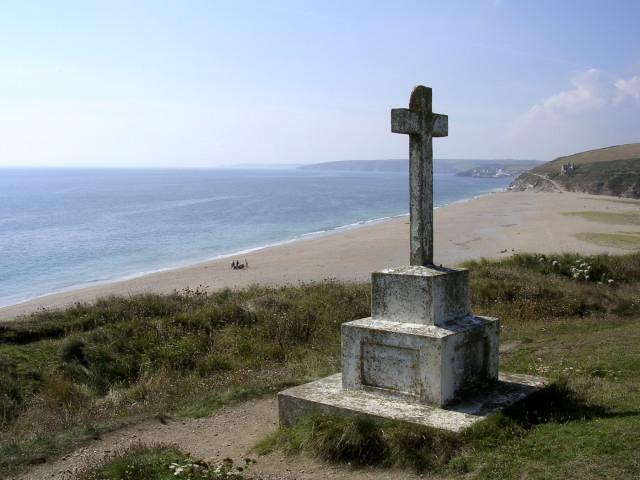
HMS Anson monument at Loe Bar

== Post script ==
The loss of Anson caused controversy at the time, because of the treatment of the dead sailors washed ashore. In those days it was customary to bury drowned seamen unceremoniously, without shroud or coffin in unconsecrated ground, with bodies remaining unburied for long periods of time. This controversy led to a local solicitor, Thomas Grylls, drafting a new law to provide drowned seamen more decent treatment. John Hearle Tremayne, Member of Parliament for Cornwall, introduced the bill which was enacted as the Burial of Drowned Persons Act 1808. A monument to the drowned sailors, and to passing of the Grylls Act, stands at the eastern end of Loe Bar, on the cliff above the beach, about 1.5 miles from Porthleven Harbour

Henry Trengrouse, a Cornish resident of the area, witnessed Anson's wreck. Distressed by the loss of life caused by the difficulties in attaching lines to the wreck, he developed a rocket apparatus to shoot lines across the surf to shipwrecks enabling the rescue of survivors in cradles. This was an early form of the breeches buoy. An example of his life-saving apparatus is on display at Helston Folk Museum. Two of her cannon now guard the entrance of Porthleven Harbour; they were recovered in 1961 from the sands at Loe Bar, the site of the wreck.
