= HMS Bombay Castle =

Ship of the line of the Royal Navy

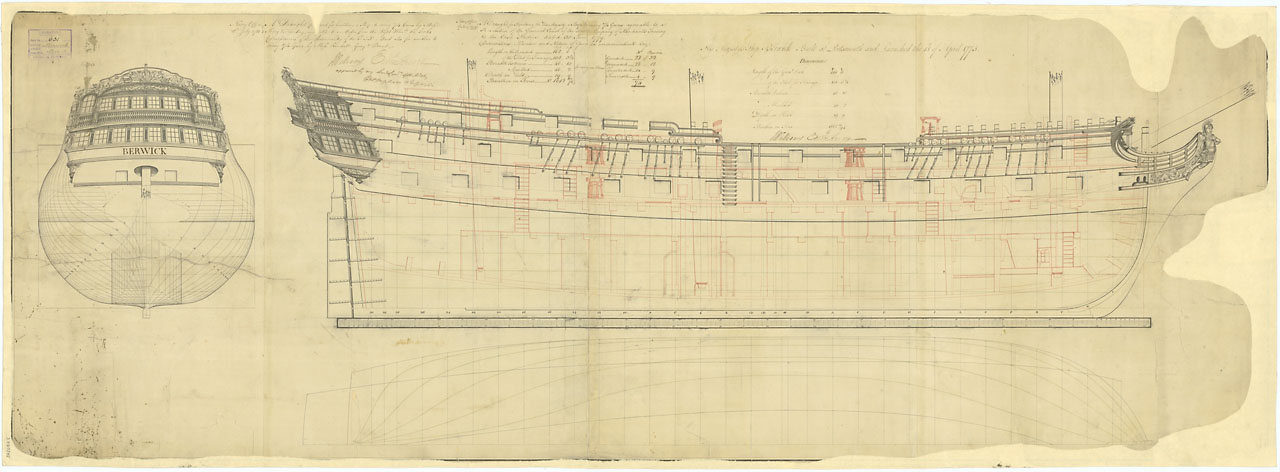
- Bombay Castle

History

Great Britain
- Name: Bombay
- Namesake: Bombay Castle
- Ordered: 14 July 1779
- Builder: Perry, Blackwall Yard
- Laid down: June 1780
- Launched: 14 June 1782
- Renamed: HMS Bombay Castle (17 February 1780)
- Fate: Wrecked, 1796

General characteristics
- Class & type: Elizabeth-class ship of the line
- Tons burthen: 1628, or 162819/94 bm
- Length: 168 ft 6 in (51.4 m) (gundeck); 138 ft 3 1/8 in (42.1 m)
- Beam: 47 ft 1 in (14.4 m)
- Depth of hold: 19 ft 9 in (6.02 m)
- Propulsion: Sails
- Sail plan: Full-rigged ship
- Armament: Gundeck: 28 × 32-pounder guns; Upper gundeck: 28 × 18-pounder guns; QD: 14 × 9-pounder guns; Fc: 4 × 9-pounder guns

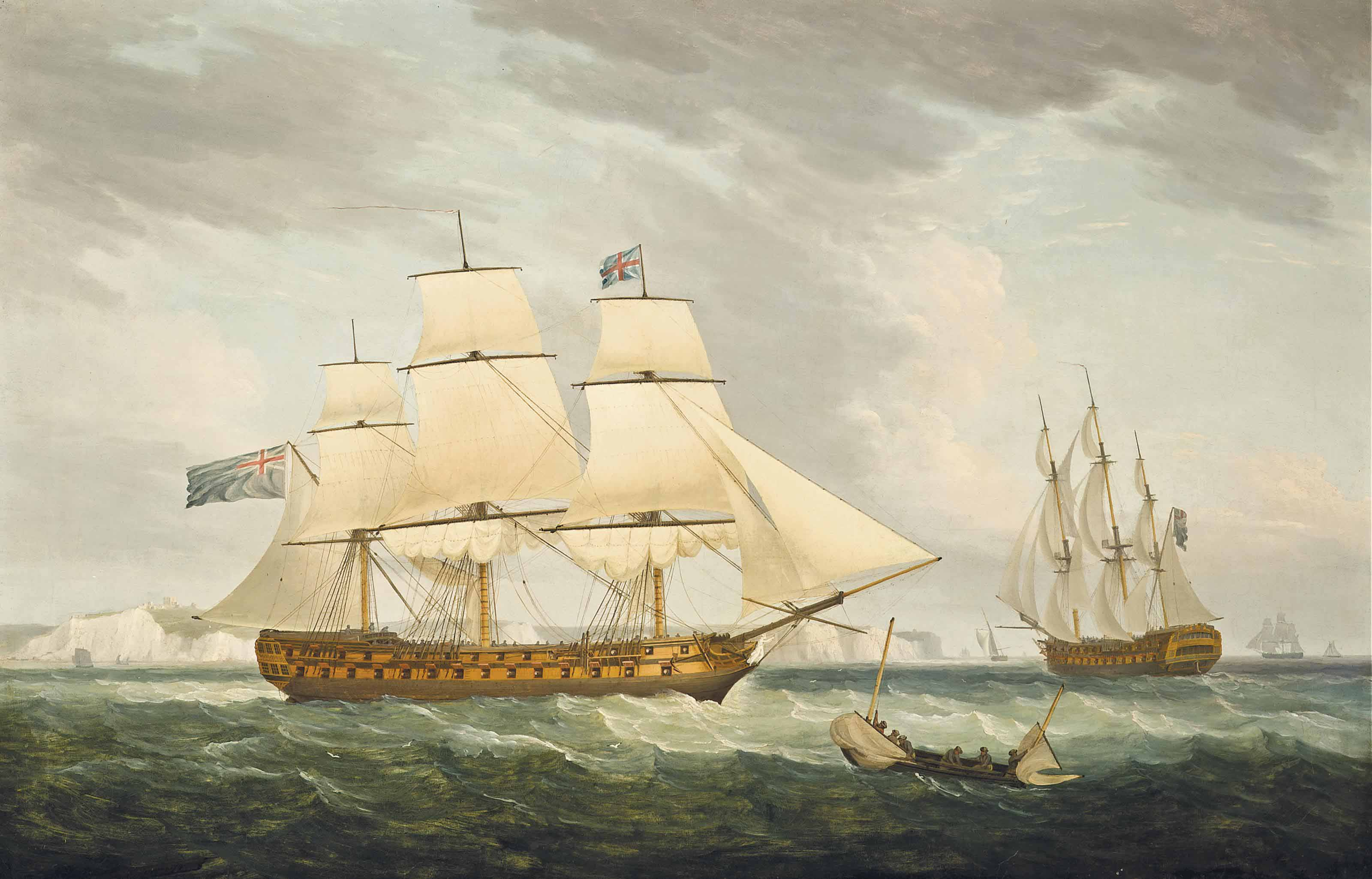
HMS Bombay Castle, in two positions, in the Channel off Dover, by Thomas Whitcombe

HMS Bombay Castle was a 74-gun third-rate ship of the line of the Royal Navy, launched on 14 June 1782 at Blackwall Yard. She grounded on 21 December 1796 in the shoals of the Tagus River's mouth.

== Origins ==
The British East India Company (EIC) funded the construction of Bombay Castle as a contribution to the war effort. Similarly, the EIC also paid for the construction of HMS Carnatic and HMS Ganges.

Bombay Castle was at Plymouth on 20 January 1795 and so shared in the proceeds of the detention of the Dutch naval vessels, East Indiamen, and other merchant vessels that were in port on the outbreak of war between Britain and the Netherlands.

== Loss ==
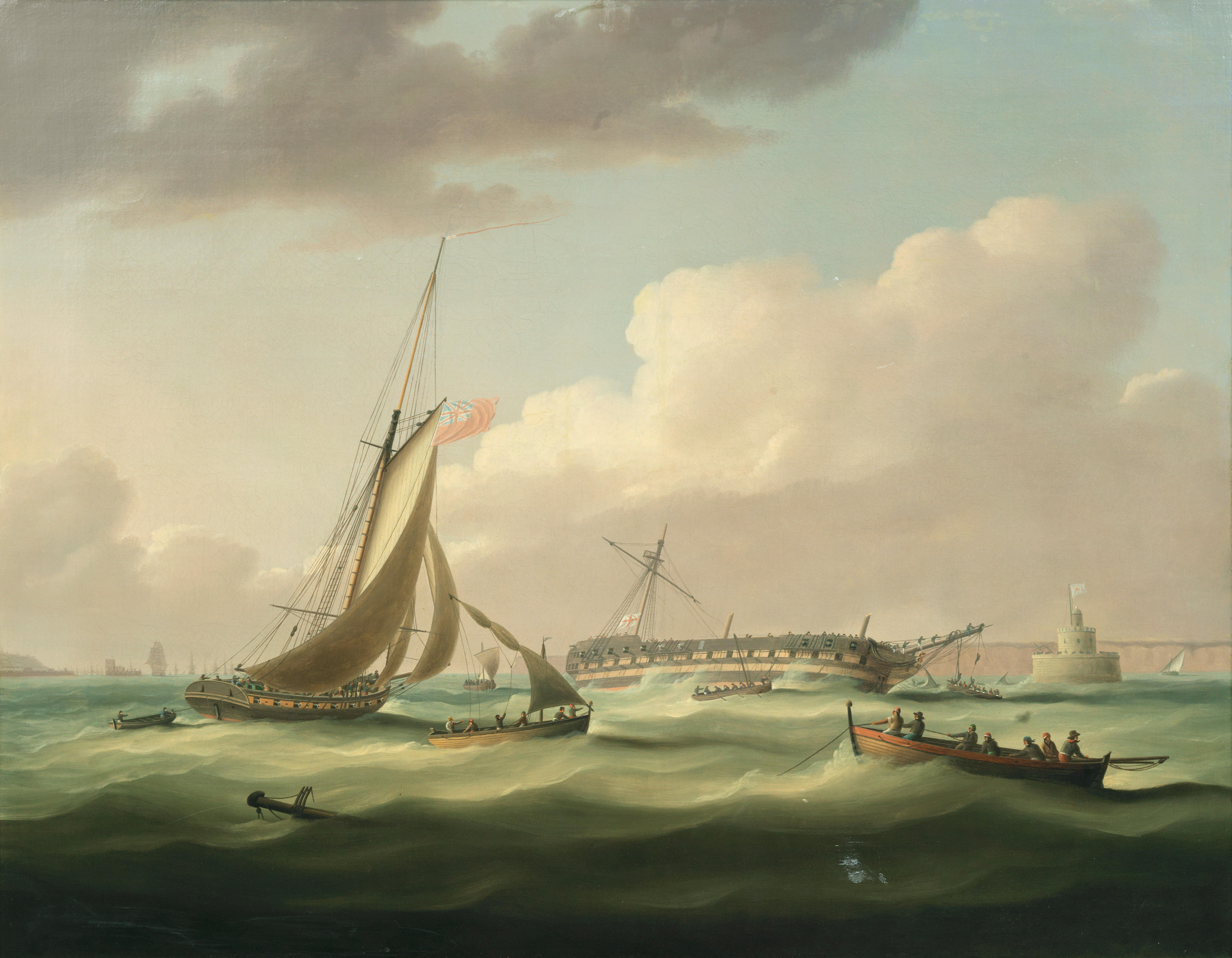
The wreck at the mouth of the Tagus, Lisbon on 21 December 1796, with the Bugio Lighthouse seen beyond, Thomas Buttersworth

Bombay Castle was under the command of Captain Thomas Sotheby when she entered the Tagus, having taken a pilot on board. In attempting to avoid the storeship Camel, which had grounded ahead of Bombay Castle, Bombay Castle too grounded. During the subsequent week, attempts were made to float her off after boats had removed her guns and stores, but without success. The navy abandoned her as a wreck on 27 December 1798.

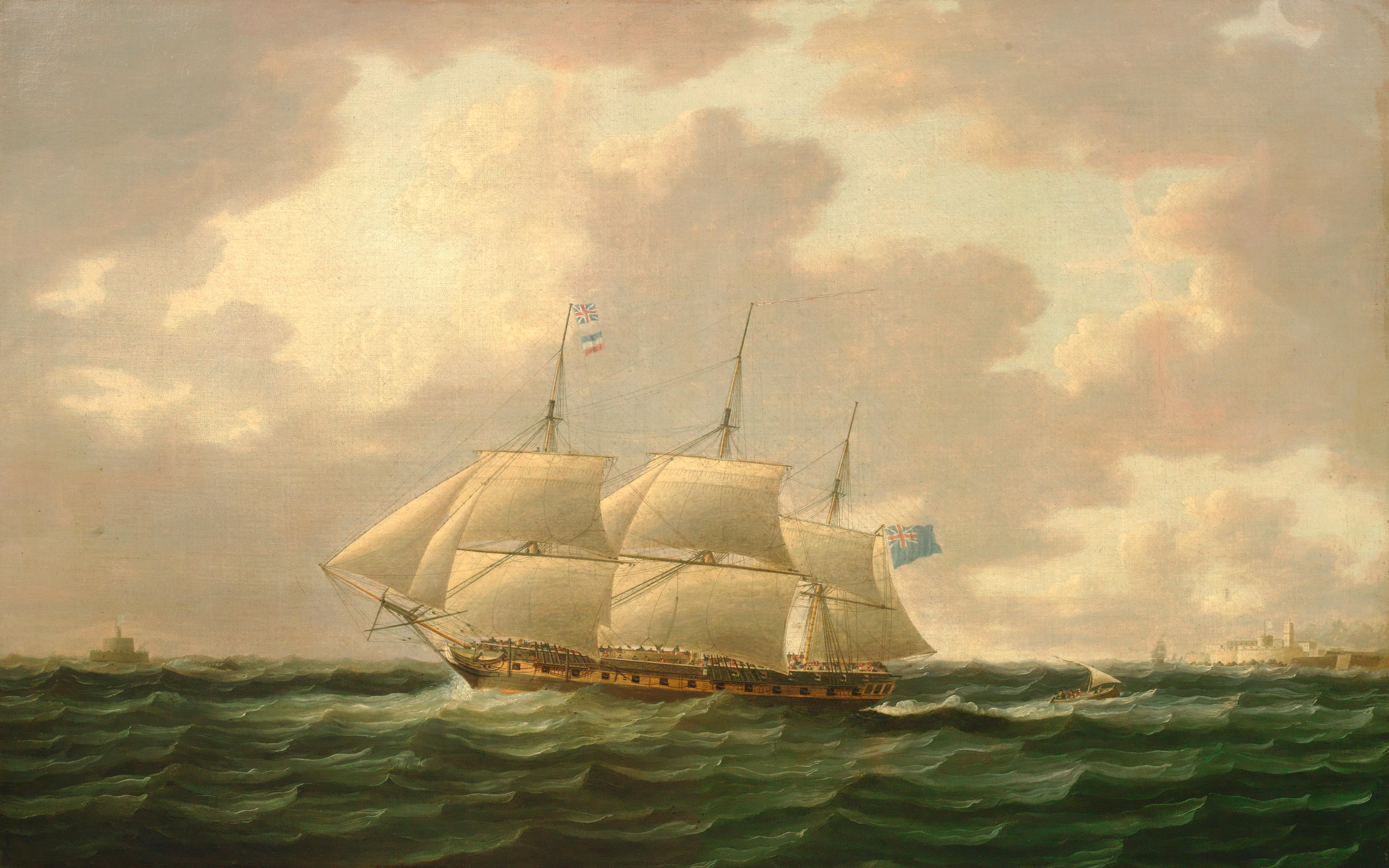
The frigate HMS Minerve heading for the open sea in 1797, the wreckage of the Bombay Castle still clearly visible alongside the lighthouse on the left, Thomas Buttersworth
