= Canton of Barneville-Carteret =

Coordinates: 49°23′15″N 1°43′36″W

Barneville-Carteret
- Former canton
- Interactive map of Barneville-Carteret
- Country: France
- Region: Normandy
- Department: Manche
- No. of communes: {{{nbcomm}}}
- Disbanded: 2015
- Population (2012): 7,623

The Canton of Barneville-Carteret in France is a former canton situated in the department of Manche and the region of Basse-Normandie. It had 7,623 inhabitants (2012). Its seat was the commune of Barneville-Carteret. It was disbanded following the French canton reorganisation which came into effect in March 2015. It consisted of 14 communes, which joined the canton of Les Pieux in 2015.

The canton comprised the following communes:

- Barneville-Carteret
- Baubigny
- Fierville-les-Mines
- La Haye-d'Ectot
- Le Mesnil
- Les Moitiers-d'Allonne
- Portbail
- Saint-Georges-de-la-Rivière
- Saint-Jean-de-la-Rivière
- Saint-Lô-d'Ourville
- Saint-Maurice-en-Cotentin
- Saint-Pierre-d'Arthéglise
- Sénoville
- Sortosville-en-Beaumont
