= Arrondissement of Cherbourg =

Coordinates: 49°38′15″N 1°37′44″W

Cherbourg
- Arrondissement
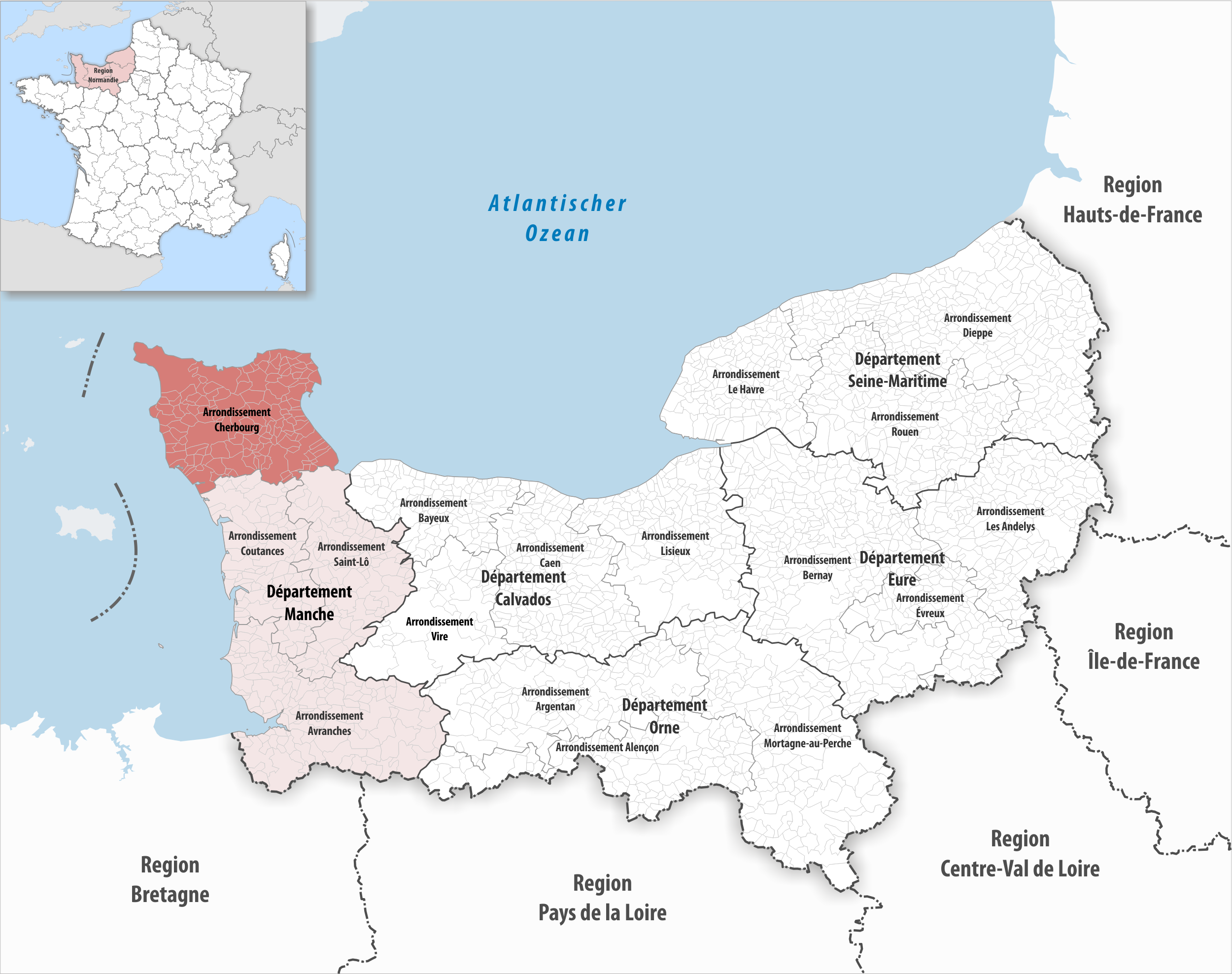
- Location within the region Normandy
- Country: France
- Region: Normandy
- Department: Manche
- No. of communes: {{{nbcomm}}}
- Area: 1,643.9 km^{2} (634.7 sq mi)
- Population (2023): 187,817
  - Density: 114.25/km^{2} (295.91/sq mi)
- INSEE code: 502

The arrondissement of Cherbourg is an arrondissement of France in the Manche department in the Normandy region. It lies entirely on the Cotentin Peninsula and has 144 communes. Its population is 186,735 (2021), and its area is 1,643.9 km^{2} (634.7 sq mi).

== Composition ==
The communes of the arrondissement of Cherbourg, and their INSEE codes, are:

1. Anneville-en-Saire (50013)
2. Audouville-la-Hubert (50021)
3. Aumeville-Lestre (50022)
4. Azeville (50026)
5. Barfleur (50030)
6. Barneville-Carteret (50031)
7. Baubigny (50033)
8. Benoîtville (50045)
9. Besneville (50049)
10. Beuzeville-la-Bastille (50052)
11. Biniville (50055)
12. Blosville (50059)
13. La Bonneville (50064)
14. Boutteville (50070)
15. Bretteville (50077)
16. Breuville (50079)
17. Bricquebec-en-Cotentin (50082)
18. Bricquebosq (50083)
19. Brillevast (50086)
20. Brix (50087)
21. Canteloup (50096)
22. Canville-la-Rocque (50097)
23. Carneville (50101)
24. Catteville (50105)
25. Cherbourg-en-Cotentin (50129)
26. Clitourps (50135)
27. Colomby (50138)
28. Couville (50149)
29. Crasville (50150)
30. Crosville-sur-Douve (50156)
31. Digosville (50162)
32. Écausseville (50169)
33. Émondeville (50172)
34. Éroudeville (50175)
35. L'Étang-Bertrand (50176)
36. Étienville (50177)
37. Fermanville (50178)
38. Fierville-les-Mines (50183)
39. Flamanville (50184)
40. Flottemanville (50186)
41. Fontenay-sur-Mer (50190)
42. Fresville (50194)
43. Gatteville-le-Phare (50196)
44. Golleville (50207)
45. Gonneville-le-Theil (50209)
46. Grosville (50222)
47. La Hague (50041)
48. Le Ham (50227)
49. Hardinvast (50230)
50. Hautteville-Bocage (50233)
51. La Haye-d'Ectot (50235)
52. Héauville (50238)
53. Helleville (50240)
54. Hémevez (50241)
55. Hiesville (50246)
56. Huberville (50251)
57. Joganville (50258)
58. Lestre (50268)
59. Liesville-sur-Douve (50269)
60. Lieusaint (50270)
61. Magneville (50285)
62. Martinvast (50294)
63. Maupertus-sur-Mer (50296)
64. Le Mesnil (50299)
65. Le Mesnil-au-Val (50305)
66. Les Moitiers-d'Allonne (50332)
67. Montaigu-la-Brisette (50335)
68. Montebourg (50341)
69. Montfarville (50342)
70. Morville (50360)
71. Négreville (50369)
72. Néhou (50370)
73. Neuville-au-Plain (50373)
74. Neuville-en-Beaumont (50374)
75. Nouainville (50382)
76. Octeville-l'Avenel (50384)
77. Orglandes (50387)
78. Ozeville (50390)
79. La Pernelle (50395)
80. Picauville (50400)
81. Pierreville (50401)
82. Les Pieux (50402)
83. Port-Bail-sur-Mer (50412)
84. Quettehou (50417)
85. Quinéville (50421)
86. Rauville-la-Bigot (50425)
87. Rauville-la-Place (50426)
88. Reigneville-Bocage (50430)
89. Réville (50433)
90. Rocheville (50435)
91. Le Rozel (50442)
92. Saint-Christophe-du-Foc (50454)
93. Saint-Cyr-Bocage (50461)
94. Sainte-Colombe (50457)
95. Sainte-Geneviève (50469)
96. Sainte-Marie-du-Mont (50509)
97. Sainte-Mère-Église (50523)
98. Saint-Floxel (50467)
99. Saint-Georges-de-la-Rivière (50471)
100. Saint-Germain-de-Tournebut (50478)
101. Saint-Germain-de-Varreville (50479)
102. Saint-Germain-le-Gaillard (50480)
103. Saint-Jacques-de-Néhou (50486)
104. Saint-Jean-de-la-Rivière (50490)
105. Saint-Joseph (50498)
106. Saint-Marcouf (50507)
107. Saint-Martin-d'Audouville (50511)
108. Saint-Martin-de-Varreville (50517)
109. Saint-Martin-le-Gréard (50519)
110. Saint-Maurice-en-Cotentin (50522)
111. Saint-Pierre-d'Arthéglise (50536)
112. Saint-Pierre-Église (50539)
113. Saint-Sauveur-le-Vicomte (50551)
114. Saint-Vaast-la-Hougue (50562)
115. Saussemesnil (50567)
116. Sébeville (50571)
117. Sénoville (50572)
118. Sideville (50575)
119. Siouville-Hague (50576)
120. Sortosville (50578)
121. Sortosville-en-Beaumont (50577)
122. Sottevast (50579)
123. Sotteville (50580)
124. Surtainville (50585)
125. Taillepied (50587)
126. Tamerville (50588)
127. Teurthéville-Bocage (50593)
128. Teurthéville-Hague (50594)
129. Théville (50596)
130. Tocqueville (50598)
131. Tollevast (50599)
132. Tréauville (50604)
133. Turqueville (50609)
134. Urville (50610)
135. Valcanville (50613)
136. Valognes (50615)
137. Varouville (50618)
138. Le Vast (50619)
139. Vaudreville (50621)
140. Le Vicel (50633)
141. Vicq-sur-Mer (50142)
142. Videcosville (50634)
143. Virandeville (50643)
144. Yvetot-Bocage (50648)

== History ==
The arrondissement of Cherbourg was created in 1811. At the January 2017 reorganisation of the arrondissements of Manche, it gained two communes from the arrondissement of Coutances.

As a result of the reorganisation of the cantons of France which came into effect in 2015, the borders of the cantons are no longer related to the borders of the arrondissements. The cantons of the arrondissement of Cherbourg were, as of January 2015:

1. Barneville-Carteret
2. Beaumont-Hague
3. Bricquebec
4. Cherbourg-Octeville-Nord-Ouest
5. Cherbourg-Octeville-Sud-Est
6. Cherbourg-Octeville-Sud-Ouest
7. Équeurdreville-Hainneville
8. Montebourg
9. Les Pieux
10. Quettehou
11. Sainte-Mère-Église
12. Saint-Pierre-Église
13. Saint-Sauveur-le-Vicomte
14. Tourlaville
15. Valognes
