= List of windmills in Manche =

A list of windmills in Manche, France.

Location	Name of mill	Type	Built	Notes	Photograph
Barfleur	Moulin de Grabec	Moulin Tour		Moulins-a-Vent (in French)	
Beauvoir	Moulin de la Bâtie	Moulin Tour		Moulins-a-Vent (in French)	
Besneville	Moulin de Besneville #1	Moulin Tour		Moulins-a-Vent (in French)	
Besneville	Moulin de Besneville #2	Moulin Tour		Moulins-a-Vent (in French)	
Besneville	Moulin de Besneville #3	Moulin Tour		Moulins-a-Vent (in French)	
Coutances	Moulin a Coutances	Moulin Tour		Moulins-a-Vent (in French)	
Fierville-les-Mines	Moulin du Cotentin	Moulin Tour	1744	Moulins-a-Vent (in French)	
Grouville-sur-Mer		Moulin Tour			
La Hague	Moulin de Denneville				
Mont Saint-Michel	Moulin de la Tour Gabriel	Moulin Tour	1524	Moulins-a-Vent (in French). The windmill is on the left of the picture.	
Les Moitiers-d'Allonne	Moulin de Romont	Moulin Tour		Moulins-a-Vent (in French)	
Les Moitiers-d'Allonne	Moulin aux Trois Moulins	Moulin Tour		Moulins-a-Vent (in French)	
Les Pas	Moulin de Corcane	Moulin Tour		Moulins-a-Vent (in French)	
Les Pas	Moulin de Bel Air			Moulins-a-Vent (in French)	
Liesville-sur-Douve	Moulin de Liesville-sur-Douve			Ruin	
Martinvast	Moulin de Domaine de Beaurepaire				
Moidrey	Moulin de Moidrey	Moulin Tour		Moulins-a-Vent (in French)	
Montsurvent	Moulin de Montsurvent	Moulin Tour		Moulins-a-Vent (in French)	
Sénoville	Moulin de Sénoville	Moulin Tour		Moulins-a-Vent (in French)	
Saint-Germain-des-Vaux	Moulin de Danneville	Moulin Tour		Moulins-a-Vent (in French)	
Saint-Jean-de-la-Rivière	Moulin a St Jean de la Rivière	Moulin Tour		Moulins-a-Vent (in French)	
Saint-Vaast-la-Hougue	Moulin de St Vaast la Hougue	Moulin Tour		Moulins-a-Vent (in French)	
Surtainville	Moulin de Surtainville	Moulin Tour		Moulins-a-Vent (in French)	
