= Pierreville =

Pierreville may refer to the following places:

- Pierreville, Manche, a commune in the Manche department, France
- Pierreville, Meurthe-et-Moselle, a commune in the Meurthe-et-Moselle department, France
- Pierreville, Quebec, a community in Quebec, Canada
