= Communauté d'agglomération du Cotentin =

Coordinates: 49.64°N 1.63°W

Cotentin
- Communauté d'agglomération
- Country: France
- Region: Normandy
- Department: Manche
- No. of communes: {{{nbcomm}}}
- Established: 2017
- Area: 1,439.4 km^{2} (555.8 sq mi)
- Population (2018): 179,484
  - Density: 124.69/km^{2} (322.95/sq mi)

Communauté d'agglomération du Cotentin is the communauté d'agglomération, an intercommunal structure, centred on the city of Cherbourg-en-Cotentin, on the Cotentin Peninsula. It is located in the Manche department, in the Normandy region, northwestern France. It was created in January 2017 by the merger of 9 communautés de communes and the 2 new communes Cherbourg-en-Cotentin and La Hague. Its area is 1439.4 km^{2}. Its population was 179,484 in 2018, of which 79,144 in Cherbourg-en-Cotentin proper.

== Composition ==
The communauté d'agglomération consists of the following 129 communes:

1. Anneville-en-Saire
2. Aumeville-Lestre
3. Azeville
4. Barfleur
5. Barneville-Carteret
6. Baubigny
7. Benoîtville
8. Besneville
9. Biniville
10. La Bonneville
11. Bretteville
12. Breuville
13. Bricquebec-en-Cotentin
14. Bricquebosq
15. Brillevast
16. Brix
17. Canteloup
18. Canville-la-Rocque
19. Carneville
20. Catteville
21. Cherbourg-en-Cotentin
22. Clitourps
23. Colomby
24. Couville
25. Crasville
26. Crosville-sur-Douve
27. Digosville
28. Écausseville
29. Émondeville
30. Éroudeville
31. L'Étang-Bertrand
32. Fermanville
33. Fierville-les-Mines
34. Flamanville
35. Flottemanville
36. Fontenay-sur-Mer
37. Fresville
38. Gatteville-le-Phare
39. Golleville
40. Gonneville-le-Theil
41. Grosville
42. La Hague
43. Le Ham
44. Hardinvast
45. Hautteville-Bocage
46. La Haye-d'Ectot
47. Héauville
48. Helleville
49. Hémevez
50. Huberville
51. Joganville
52. Lestre
53. Lieusaint
54. Magneville
55. Martinvast
56. Maupertus-sur-Mer
57. Le Mesnil
58. Le Mesnil-au-Val
59. Les Moitiers-d'Allonne
60. Montaigu-la-Brisette
61. Montebourg
62. Montfarville
63. Morville
64. Négreville
65. Néhou
66. Neuville-en-Beaumont
67. Nouainville
68. Octeville-l'Avenel
69. Orglandes
70. Ozeville
71. La Pernelle
72. Pierreville
73. Les Pieux
74. Port-Bail-sur-Mer
75. Quettehou
76. Quinéville
77. Rauville-la-Bigot
78. Rauville-la-Place
79. Reigneville-Bocage
80. Réville
81. Rocheville
82. Le Rozel
83. Saint-Christophe-du-Foc
84. Saint-Cyr-Bocage
85. Sainte-Colombe
86. Sainte-Geneviève
87. Saint-Floxel
88. Saint-Georges-de-la-Rivière
89. Saint-Germain-de-Tournebut
90. Saint-Germain-le-Gaillard
91. Saint-Jacques-de-Néhou
92. Saint-Jean-de-la-Rivière
93. Saint-Joseph
94. Saint-Marcouf
95. Saint-Martin-d'Audouville
96. Saint-Martin-le-Gréard
97. Saint-Maurice-en-Cotentin
98. Saint-Pierre-d'Arthéglise
99. Saint-Pierre-Église
100. Saint-Sauveur-le-Vicomte
101. Saint-Vaast-la-Hougue
102. Saussemesnil
103. Sénoville
104. Sideville
105. Siouville-Hague
106. Sortosville
107. Sortosville-en-Beaumont
108. Sottevast
109. Sotteville
110. Surtainville
111. Taillepied
112. Tamerville
113. Teurthéville-Bocage
114. Teurthéville-Hague
115. Théville
116. Tocqueville
117. Tollevast
118. Tréauville
119. Urville
120. Valcanville
121. Valognes
122. Varouville
123. Le Vast
124. Vaudreville
125. Le Vicel
126. Vicq-sur-Mer
127. Videcosville
128. Virandeville
129. Yvetot-Bocage
