= Saint-Christophe-du-Foc =

- Commune
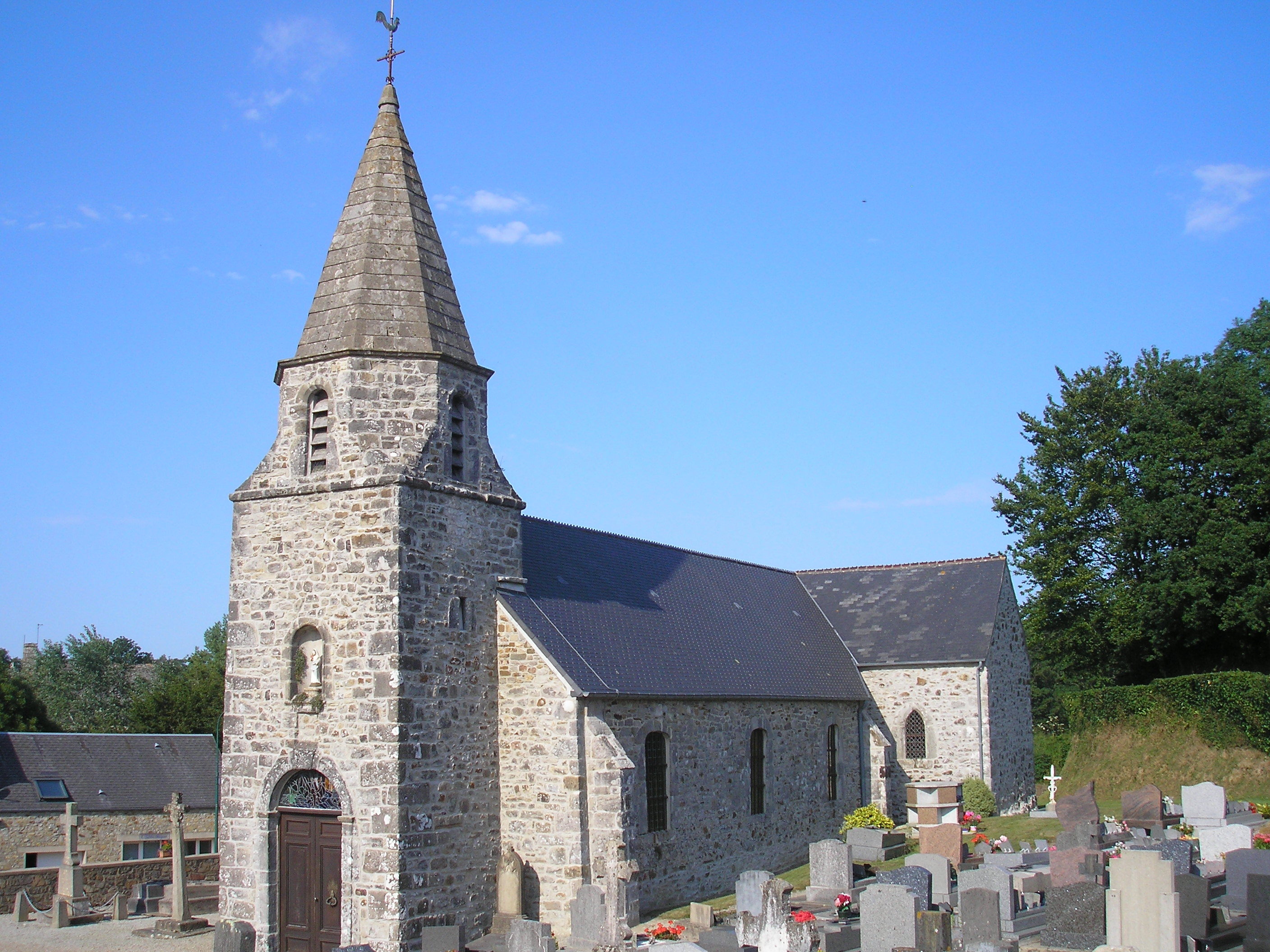
- The church of Saint-Christophe-du-Foc
- Location of Saint-Christophe-du-Foc
- Location within France Location within Normandy
- Coordinates: 49°33′22″N 1°44′24″W
- Country: France
- Region: Normandy
- Department: Manche
- Arrondissement: Cherbourg
- Canton: Les Pieux
- Intercommunality: CA Cotentin

Government
  - Mayor (2020–2026): Myriam Hamon
- Area^{1}: 3.58 km^{2} (1.38 sq mi)
- Elevation: 78 m (256 ft)
- Highest elevation: 99 m (325 ft)
- Lowest elevation: 44 m (144 ft)
- Population (2023): 409
  - Density: 114/km^{2} (296/sq mi)
- Time zone: UTC+01:00 (CET)
  - Summer (DST): UTC+02:00 (CEST)
- INSEE/Postal code: 50454 /50340
- ^{1} French Land Register data, which excludes lakes, ponds, glaciers > 1 km^{2} (0.386 sq mi or 247 acres) and river estuaries.

Saint-Christophe-du-Foc (French pronunciation: [sɛ̃ kʁistɔf dy fɔk]) is a commune in the Manche department in Normandy in north-western France.

== Géographie ==
Covering 358 hectares, the territory of Saint-Christophe-du-Foc was the smallest in the "canton des Pieux" before the extension of 2015. The village is also located near Cherbourg-en-Cotentin.

== History ==
In the 17th century, Saint-Christophe had for lord Guillaume Le Fillastre who married a second time in 1645 with Gabrielle de Ravalet de Tourlaville, whom in 1649 tried to kill the only son of her husband, Philippe Le Fillastre. When the plot whas discovered, she decided to threw herself down a window rather than being arrested.

== See also ==
- Communes of the Manche department
