= Tréauville =

- Commune
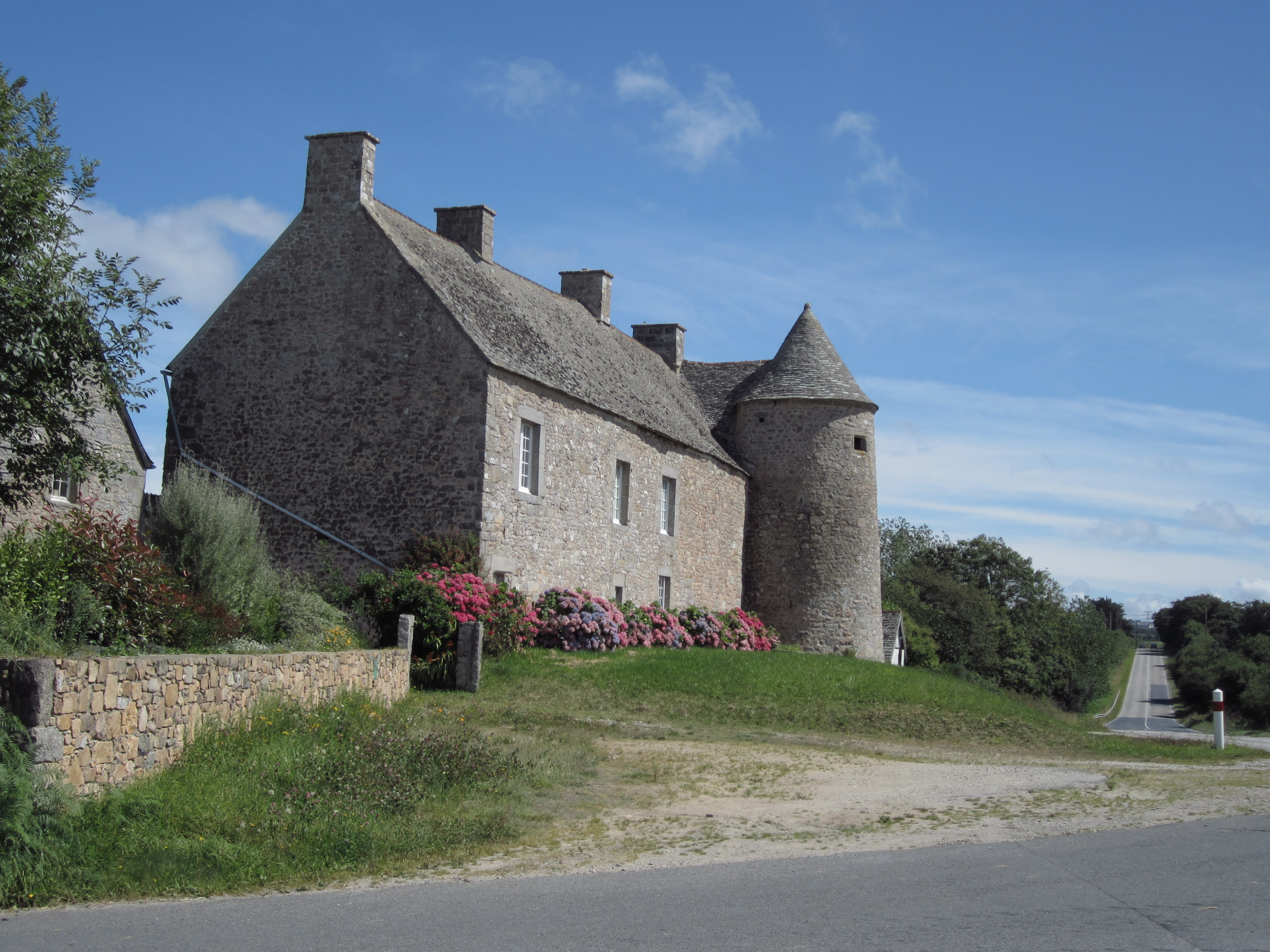
- Manor house
- Location of Tréauville
- Location within France Location within Normandy
- Coordinates: 49°31′55″N 1°48′38″W
- Country: France
- Region: Normandy
- Department: Manche
- Arrondissement: Cherbourg
- Canton: Les Pieux
- Intercommunality: CA Cotentin

Government
  - Mayor (2020–2026): Jacques Viger
- Area^{1}: 12.84 km^{2} (4.96 sq mi)
- Elevation: 30 m (98 ft)
- Highest elevation: 130 m (430 ft)
- Lowest elevation: 4 m (13 ft)
- Population (2023): 719
  - Density: 56.0/km^{2} (145/sq mi)
- Demonym: Tréauvillais
- Time zone: UTC+01:00 (CET)
  - Summer (DST): UTC+02:00 (CEST)
- INSEE/Postal code: 50604 /50340
- Website: www.treauville.fr
- ^{1} French Land Register data, which excludes lakes, ponds, glaciers > 1 km^{2} (0.386 sq mi or 247 acres) and river estuaries.

Tréauville (French pronunciation: [tʁeovil]) is a commune in the Manche department in Normandy in north-western France.

== Heraldry ==
Arms of Tréauville	The arms of Tréauville are blazoned : Per fess 1: Azure, 2 barulets argent below a lion passant argent armed, langued, crowned and tailed Or; 2: Argent, a chief gules, overall a pale sable, between 2 demi-vols gules.

== See also ==
- Communes of the Manche department
