= Benoîtville =

- Commune
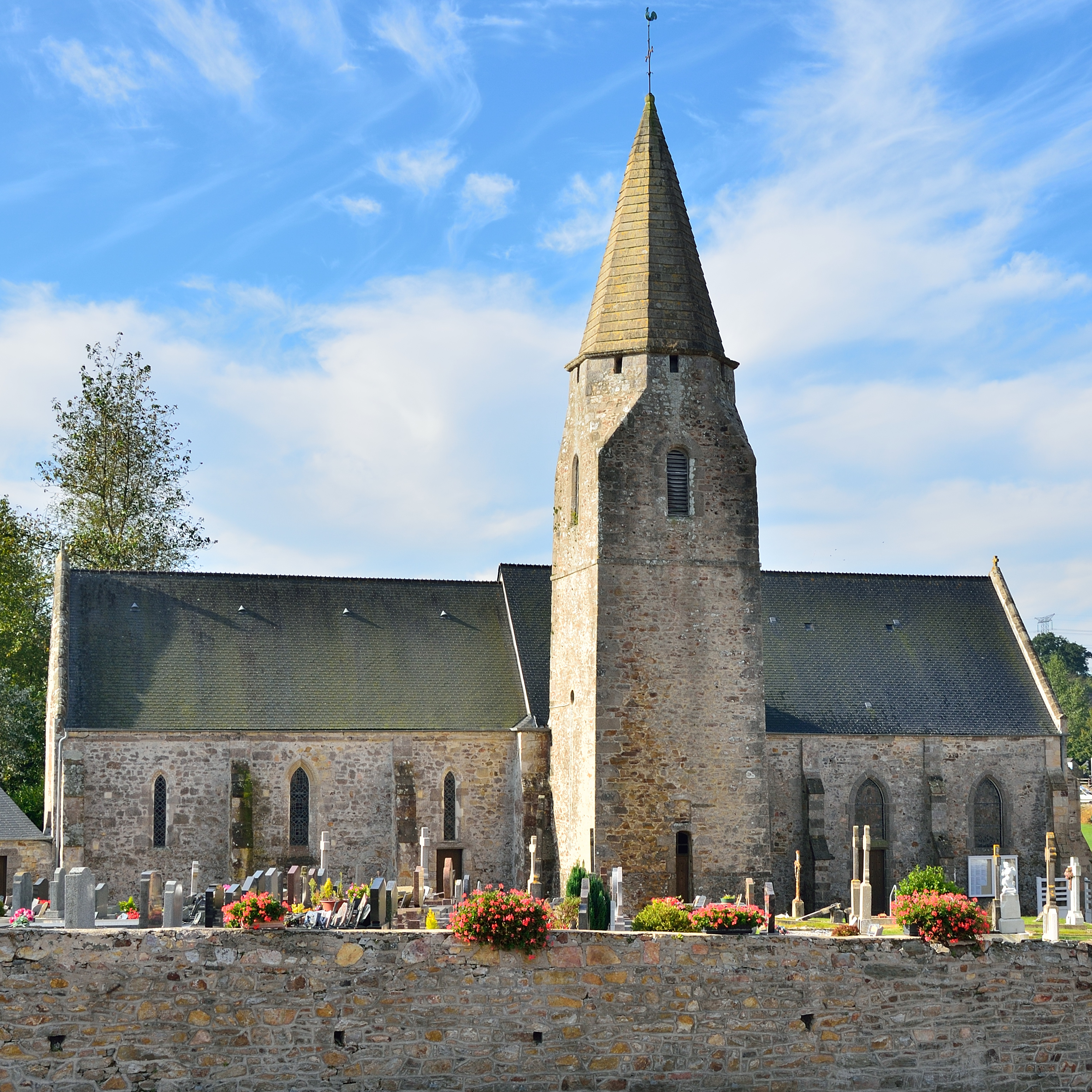
- The church of Saint-Pierre
- Location of Benoîtville
- Location within France Location within Normandy
- Coordinates: 49°31′43″N 1°46′45″W
- Country: France
- Region: Normandy
- Department: Manche
- Arrondissement: Cherbourg
- Canton: Les Pieux
- Intercommunality: CA Cotentin

Government
  - Mayor (2020–2026): Daniel Gancel
- Area^{1}: 8.29 km^{2} (3.20 sq mi)
- Elevation: 50 m (160 ft)
- Highest elevation: 131 m (430 ft)
- Lowest elevation: 35 m (115 ft)
- Population (2023): 640
  - Density: 77/km^{2} (200/sq mi)
- Time zone: UTC+01:00 (CET)
  - Summer (DST): UTC+02:00 (CEST)
- INSEE/Postal code: 50045 /50340
- ^{1} French Land Register data, which excludes lakes, ponds, glaciers > 1 km^{2} (0.386 sq mi or 247 acres) and river estuaries.

Benoîtville or Benoistville (French pronunciation: [bənwavil]), is a commune in the Manche department in the Normandy region in northwestern France.

== Population ==
Historical population
Year	Pop.	±% p.a.
1968	336	—
1975	320	−0.69%
1982	416	+3.82%
1990	443	+0.79%
1999	458	+0.37%
2007	551	+2.34%
2012	606	+1.92%
2017	617	+0.36%
2023	640	+0.61%
Source: INSEE

== See also ==
- Communes of the Manche department
