= Grosville =

- Commune
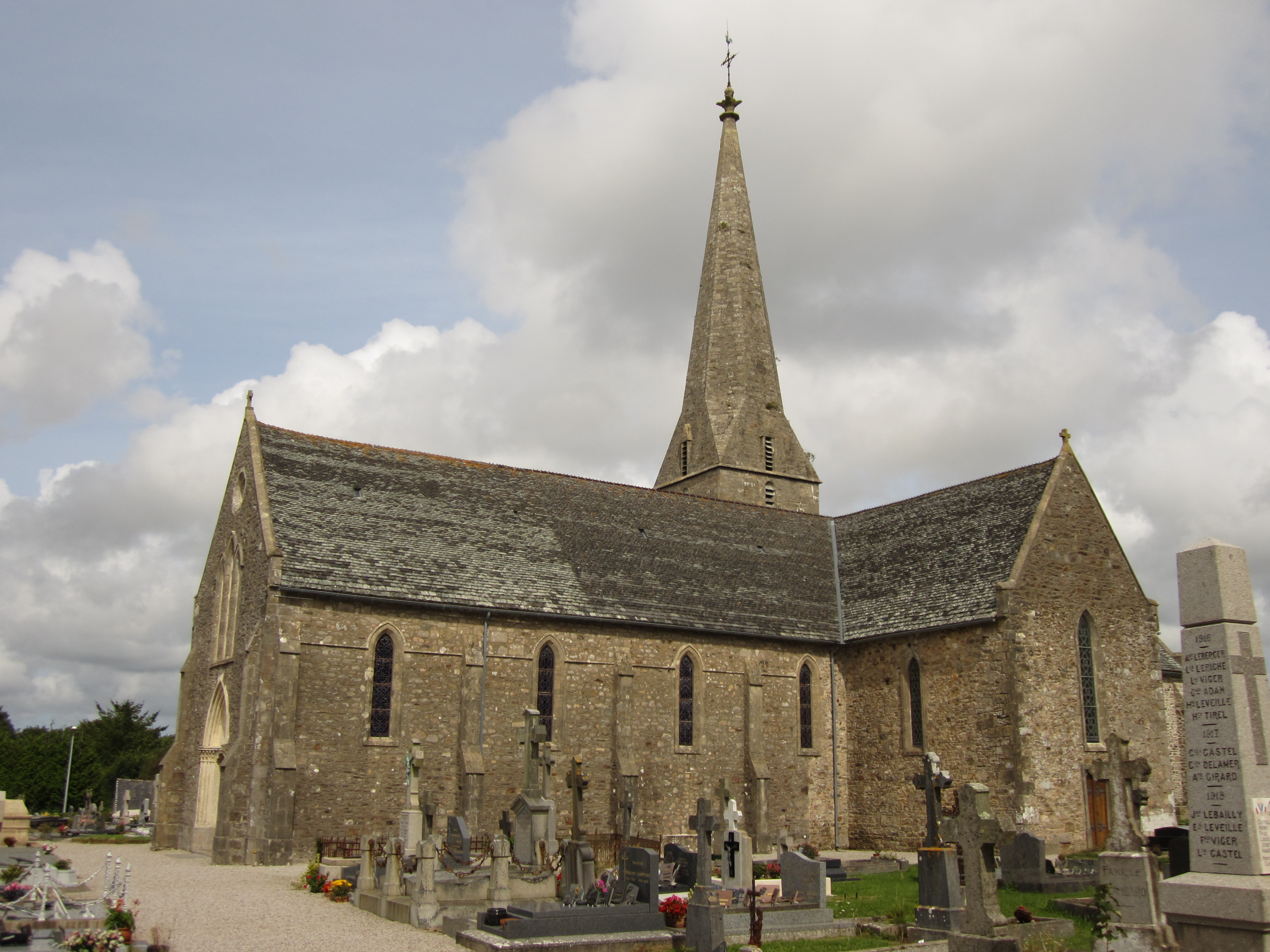
- The church of Saint-Martin
- Location of Grosville
- Location within France Location within Normandy
- Coordinates: 49°30′37″N 1°44′30″W
- Country: France
- Region: Normandy
- Department: Manche
- Arrondissement: Cherbourg
- Canton: Les Pieux
- Intercommunality: CA Cotentin

Government
  - Mayor (2020–2026): Laurent Hayé
- Area^{1}: 13.15 km^{2} (5.08 sq mi)
- Elevation: 123 m (404 ft)
- Highest elevation: 137 m (449 ft)
- Lowest elevation: 56 m (184 ft)
- Population (2023): 809
  - Density: 61.5/km^{2} (159/sq mi)
- Time zone: UTC+01:00 (CET)
  - Summer (DST): UTC+02:00 (CEST)
- INSEE/Postal code: 50222 /50340
- ^{1} French Land Register data, which excludes lakes, ponds, glaciers > 1 km^{2} (0.386 sq mi or 247 acres) and river estuaries.

Grosville is a commune in the Manche department in north-western France.

== Heraldry ==
Arms of Grosville	The arms of Grosville are blazoned : Per fess 1: Azure, a crescent Or between 2 towers argent open and pierced of the field, masoned sable, and in chief in fess 3 mullets Or; 2: per pale A: Argent, an eagle (displayed) sable membered Or, and B: Azure, 3 fesses enhanced argent, overall a chevron gules, in base a rose argent.

== See also ==
- Communes of the Manche department
