= Biniville =

- Commune
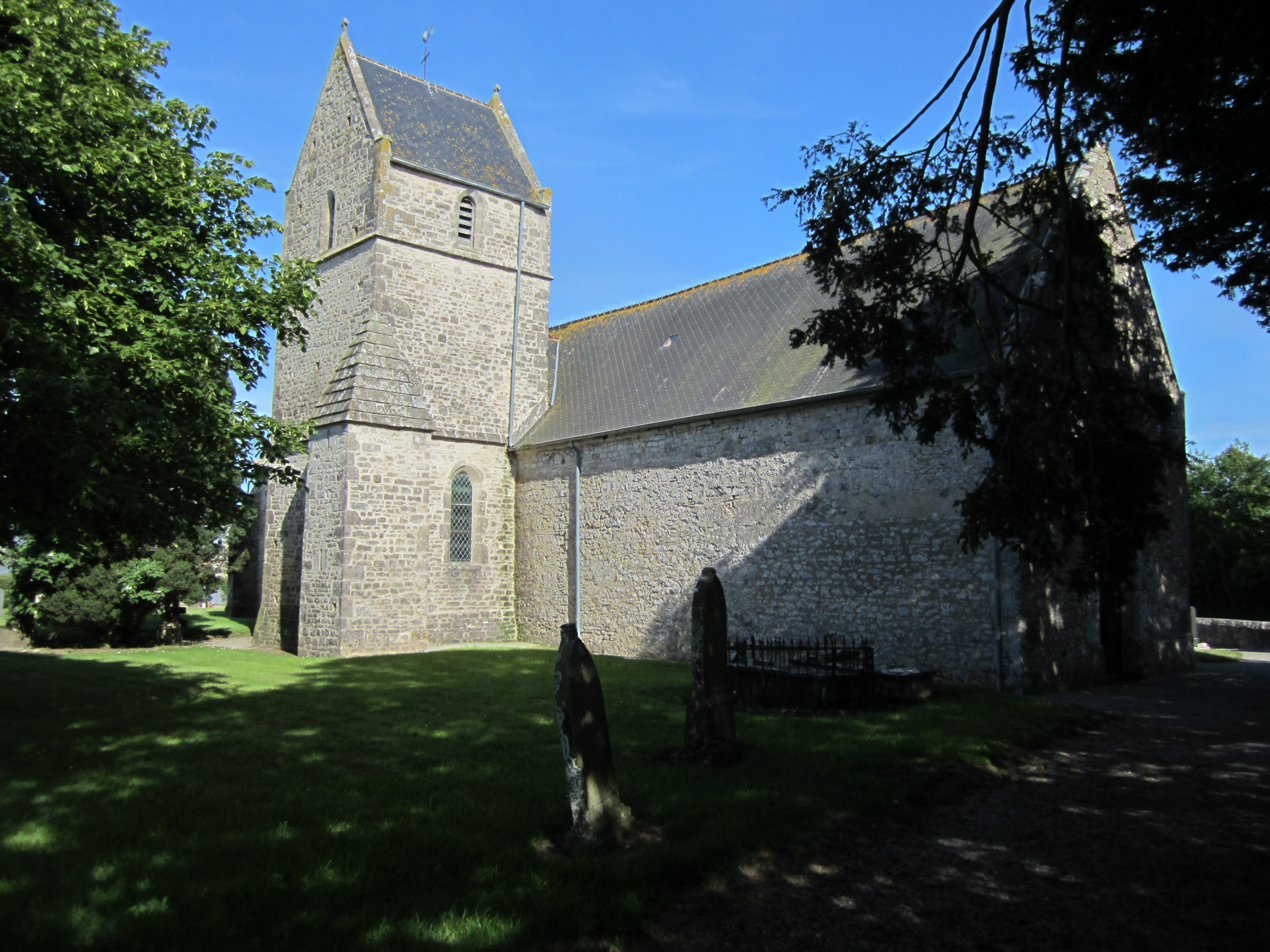
- The church of Saint-Pierre
- Location of Biniville
- Location within France Location within Normandy
- Coordinates: 49°25′42″N 1°28′33″W
- Country: France
- Region: Normandy
- Department: Manche
- Arrondissement: Cherbourg
- Canton: Bricquebec-en-Cotentin
- Intercommunality: CA Cotentin

Government
  - Mayor (2020–2026): Nathalie Baldacci
- Area^{1}: 2.98 km^{2} (1.15 sq mi)
- Elevation: 35 m (115 ft)
- Highest elevation: 40 m (130 ft)
- Lowest elevation: 14 m (46 ft)
- Population (2023): 118
  - Density: 39.6/km^{2} (103/sq mi)
- Time zone: UTC+01:00 (CET)
  - Summer (DST): UTC+02:00 (CEST)
- INSEE/Postal code: 50055 /50390
- ^{1} French Land Register data, which excludes lakes, ponds, glaciers > 1 km^{2} (0.386 sq mi or 247 acres) and river estuaries.

Biniville (French pronunciation: [binivil]) is a commune in the Manche department in the Normandy region in northwestern France.

== Population ==
Historical population
Year	Pop.	±% p.a.
1968	89	—
1975	103	+2.11%
1982	105	+0.28%
1990	95	−1.24%
1999	89	−0.72%
2007	92	+0.42%
2012	113	+4.20%
2017	114	+0.18%
2023	118	+0.58%
Source: INSEE

== See also ==
- Communes of the Manche department
