= Bricquebosq =

- Commune
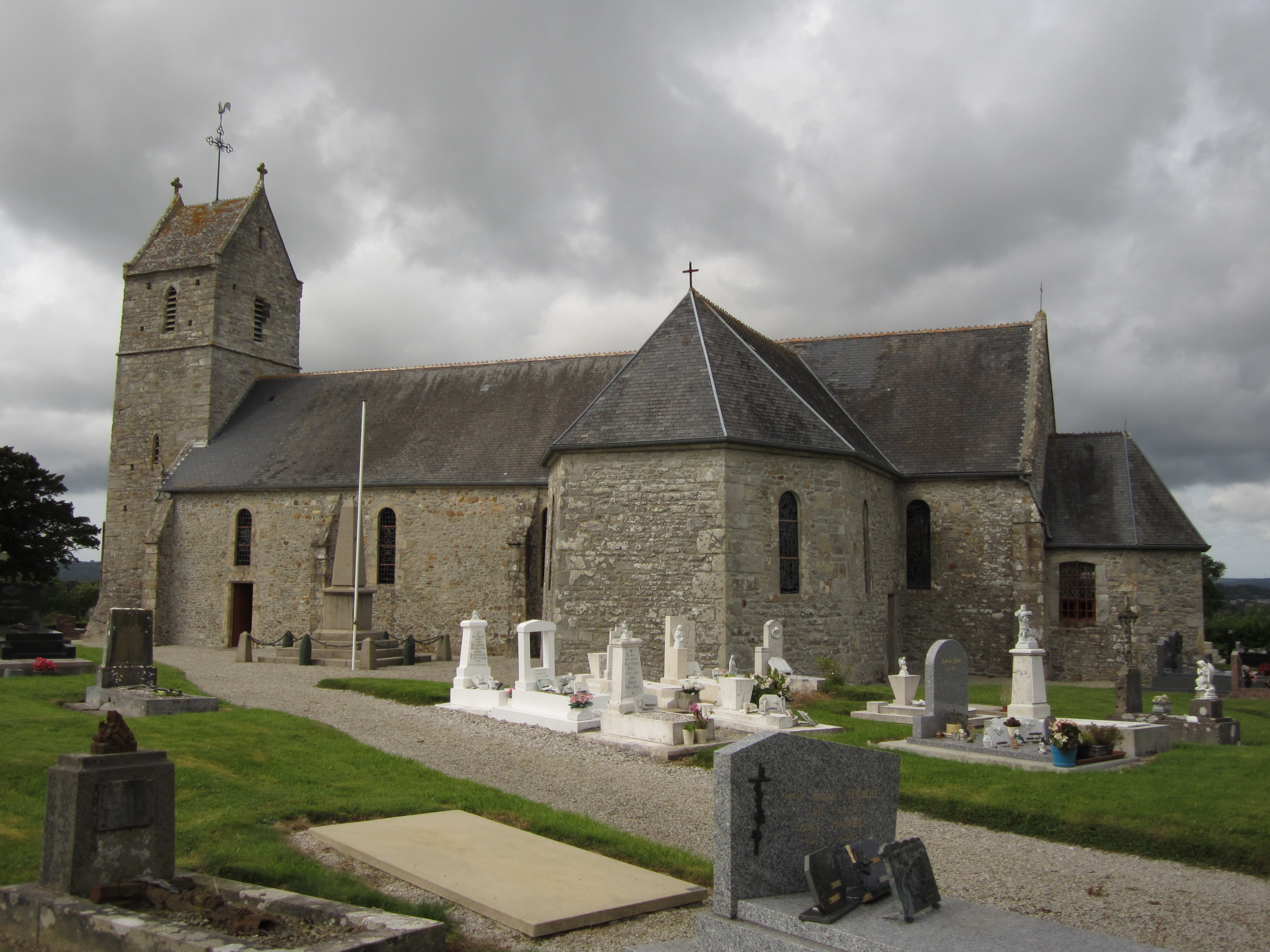
- The church of Saint-Michel
- Location of Bricquebosq
- Location within France Location within Normandy
- Coordinates: 49°32′09″N 1°43′02″W
- Country: France
- Region: Normandy
- Department: Manche
- Arrondissement: Cherbourg
- Canton: Les Pieux
- Intercommunality: CA Cotentin

Government
  - Mayor (2020–2026): Hubert Collas
- Area^{1}: 8.05 km^{2} (3.11 sq mi)
- Elevation: 100 m (330 ft)
- Highest elevation: 128 m (420 ft)
- Lowest elevation: 59 m (194 ft)
- Population (2023): 638
  - Density: 79.3/km^{2} (205/sq mi)
- Time zone: UTC+01:00 (CET)
  - Summer (DST): UTC+02:00 (CEST)
- INSEE/Postal code: 50083 /50340
- ^{1} French Land Register data, which excludes lakes, ponds, glaciers > 1 km^{2} (0.386 sq mi or 247 acres) and river estuaries.

Bricquebosq (French pronunciation: [bʁikbo]) is a commune in the Manche department in Normandy in northwestern France.

== Population ==
Historical population
Year	Pop.	±% p.a.
1968	389	—
1975	366	−0.87%
1982	386	+0.76%
1990	414	+0.88%
1999	447	+0.86%
2007	480	+0.89%
2012	555	+2.95%
2017	588	+1.16%
2023	638	+1.37%
Source: INSEE

== See also ==
- Communes of the Manche department
