= Saint-Germain-le-Gaillard, Manche =

Saint-Germain-le-Gaillard
- Commune
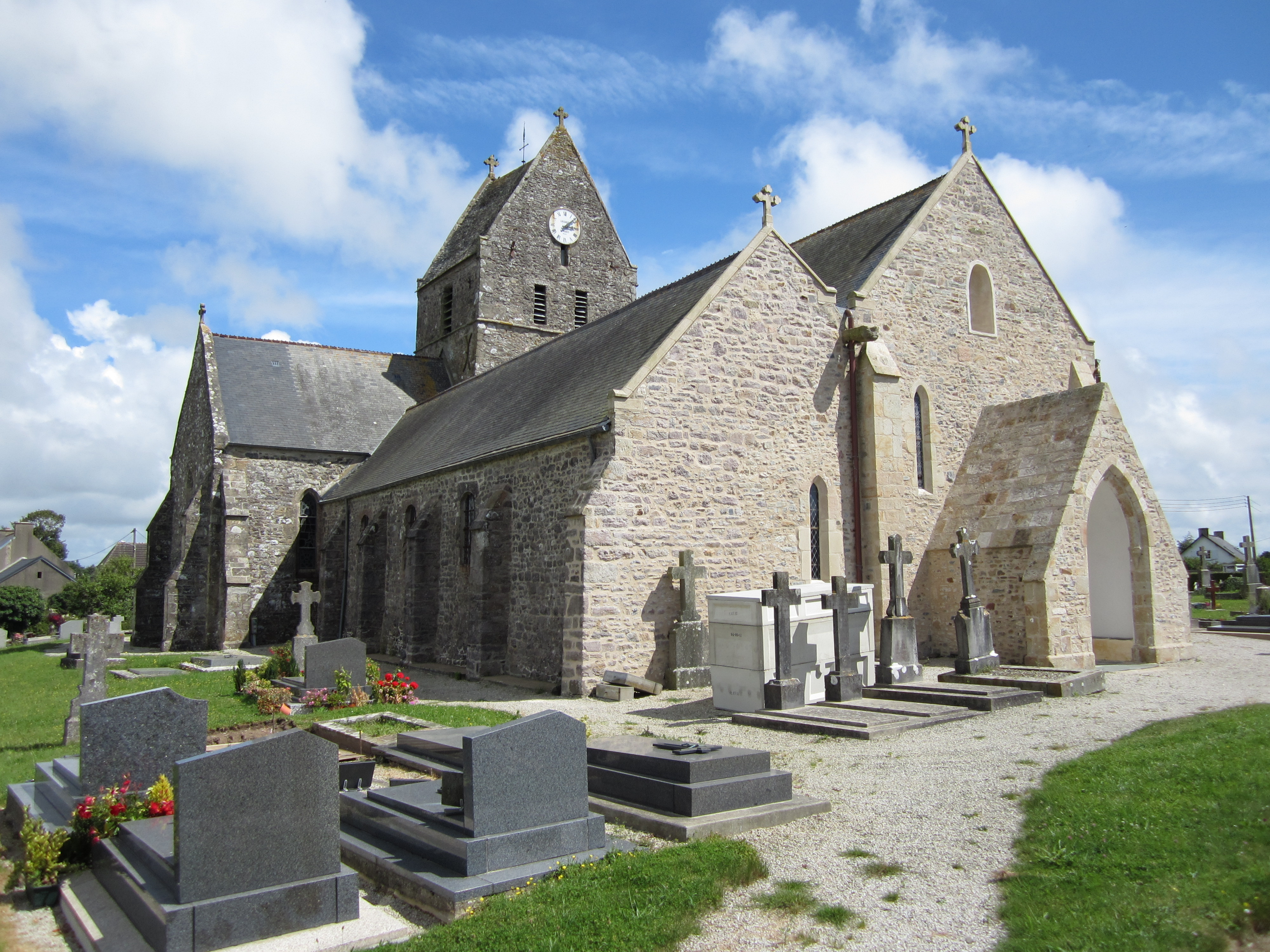
- The church of Saint Germain
- Location of Saint-Germain-le-Gaillard
- Location within France Location within Normandy
- Coordinates: 49°29′13″N 1°46′52″W
- Country: France
- Region: Normandy
- Department: Manche
- Arrondissement: Cherbourg
- Canton: Les Pieux
- Intercommunality: CA Cotentin

Government
  - Mayor (2022–2026): Philippe Soinard
- Area^{1}: 13.83 km^{2} (5.34 sq mi)
- Elevation: 120 m (390 ft)
- Highest elevation: 127 m (417 ft)
- Lowest elevation: 14 m (46 ft)
- Population (2023): 801
  - Density: 57.9/km^{2} (150/sq mi)
- Time zone: UTC+01:00 (CET)
  - Summer (DST): UTC+02:00 (CEST)
- INSEE/Postal code: 50480 /50340
- ^{1} French Land Register data, which excludes lakes, ponds, glaciers > 1 km^{2} (0.386 sq mi or 247 acres) and river estuaries.

Saint-Germain-le-Gaillard (French pronunciation: [sɛ̃ ʒɛʁmɛ̃ lə ɡajaʁ]) is a commune in the Manche department in Normandy in north-western France.

== See also ==
- Communes of the Manche department
