= Videcosville =

- Commune
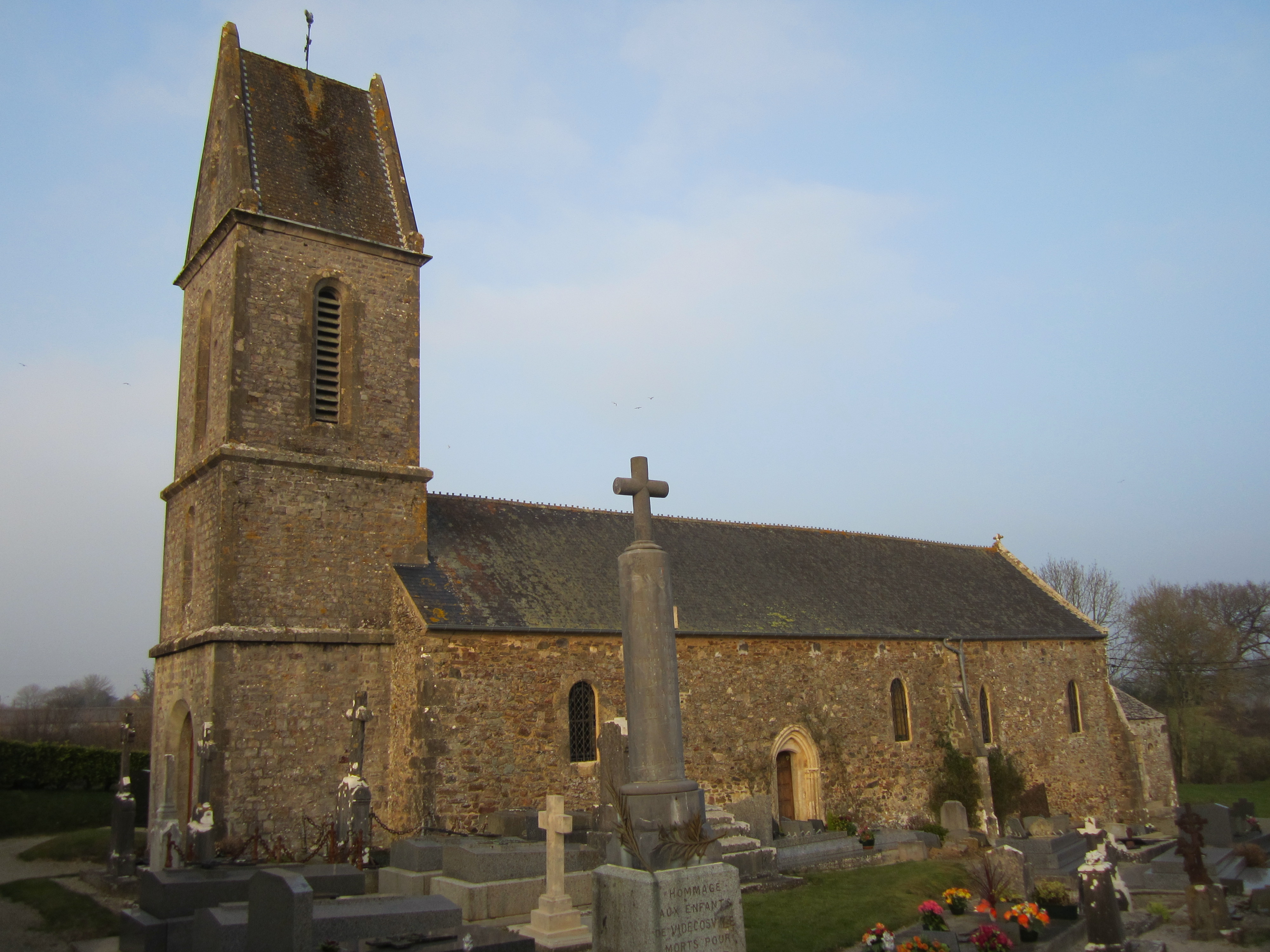
- Saint-Martin church
- Location of Videcosville
- Location within France Location within Normandy
- Coordinates: 49°33′50″N 1°22′12″W
- Country: France
- Region: Normandy
- Department: Manche
- Arrondissement: Cherbourg
- Canton: Val-de-Saire
- Intercommunality: CA Cotentin

Government
  - Mayor (2020–2026): Philippe Le Petit
- Area^{1}: 2.51 km^{2} (0.97 sq mi)
- Elevation: 79 m (259 ft)
- Highest elevation: 87 m (285 ft)
- Lowest elevation: 39 m (128 ft)
- Population (2023): 93
  - Density: 37/km^{2} (96/sq mi)
- Time zone: UTC+01:00 (CET)
  - Summer (DST): UTC+02:00 (CEST)
- INSEE/Postal code: 50634 /50630
- ^{1} French Land Register data, which excludes lakes, ponds, glaciers > 1 km^{2} (0.386 sq mi or 247 acres) and river estuaries.

Videcosville (French pronunciation: [vidkovil]) is a commune in the Manche department in Normandy in north-western France.

== See also ==
- Communes of the Manche department
