= Vaudreville =

- Commune
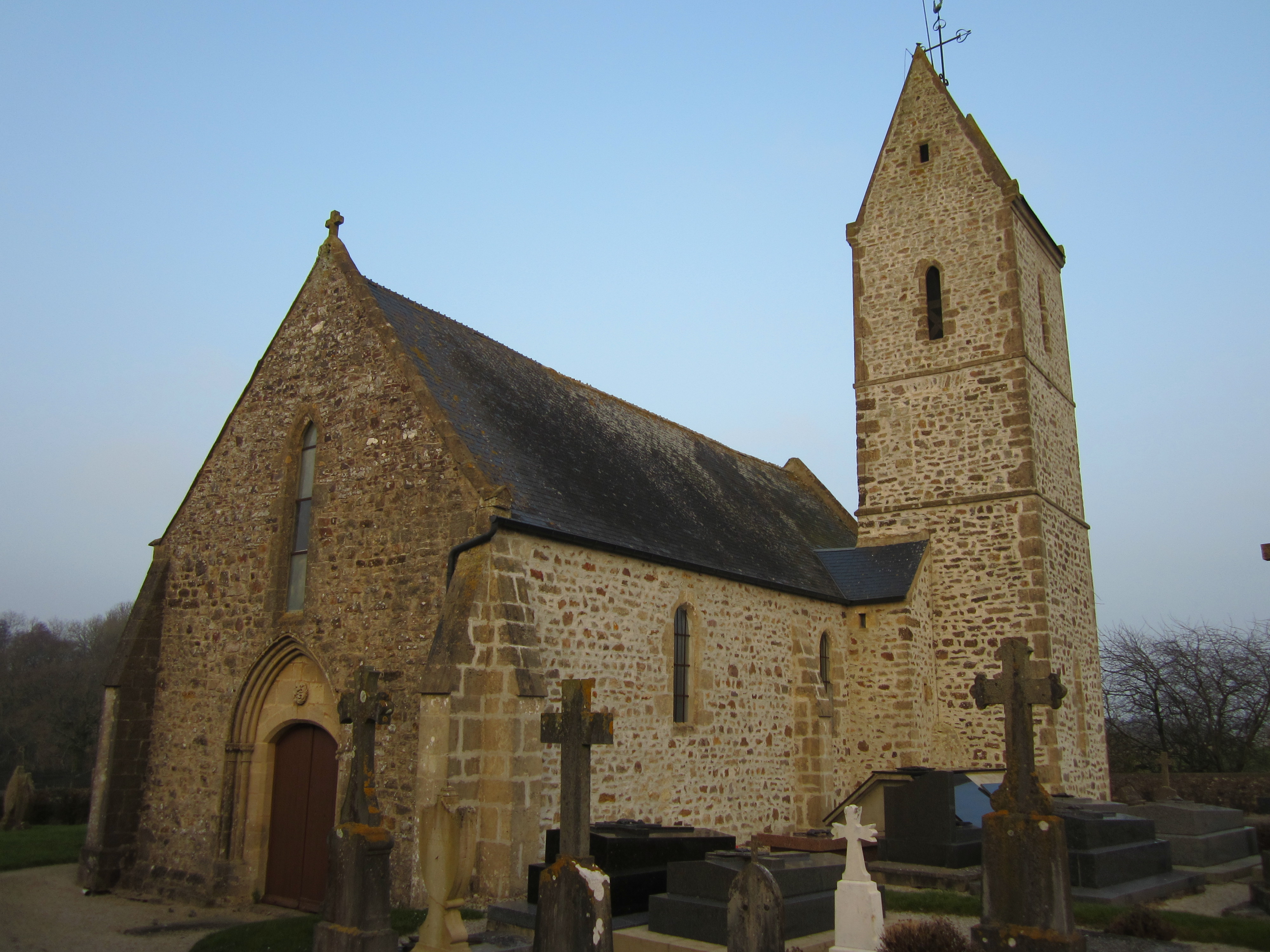
- Saint-Basile church
- Location of Vaudreville
- Location within France Location within Normandy
- Coordinates: 49°31′05″N 1°22′10″W
- Country: France
- Region: Normandy
- Department: Manche
- Arrondissement: Cherbourg
- Canton: Valognes
- Intercommunality: CA Cotentin

Government
  - Mayor (2020–2026): Geneviève Gilles
- Area^{1}: 3.03 km^{2} (1.17 sq mi)
- Elevation: 47 m (154 ft)
- Highest elevation: 72 m (236 ft)
- Lowest elevation: 12 m (39 ft)
- Population (2023): 77
  - Density: 25/km^{2} (66/sq mi)
- Time zone: UTC+01:00 (CET)
  - Summer (DST): UTC+02:00 (CEST)
- INSEE/Postal code: 50621 /50310
- ^{1} French Land Register data, which excludes lakes, ponds, glaciers > 1 km^{2} (0.386 sq mi or 247 acres) and river estuaries.

Vaudreville (French pronunciation: [vodʁəvil]) is a commune in the Manche department in Normandy in north-western France.

== See also ==
- Communes of the Manche department
