= Maupertus-sur-Mer =

- Commune
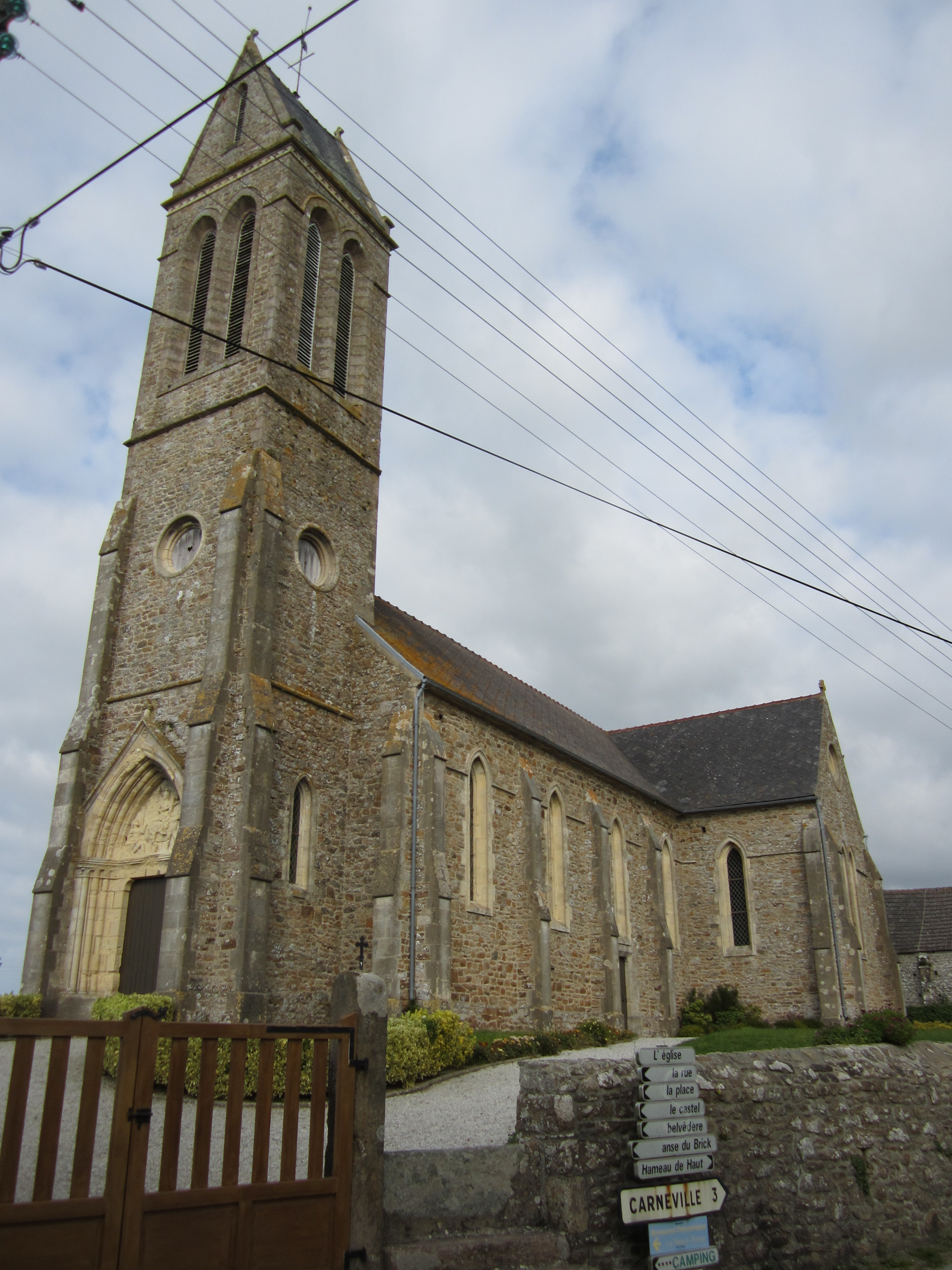
- The church of Saint-Martin
- Location of Maupertus-sur-Mer
- Location within France Location within Normandy
- Coordinates: 49°39′30″N 1°29′00″W
- Country: France
- Region: Normandy
- Department: Manche
- Arrondissement: Cherbourg
- Canton: Val-de-Saire
- Intercommunality: CA Cotentin

Government
  - Mayor (2020–2026): Thierry Gervaise
- Area^{1}: 3.42 km^{2} (1.32 sq mi)
- Elevation: 119 m (390 ft)
- Highest elevation: 152 m (499 ft)
- Lowest elevation: 0 m (0 ft)
- Population (2023): 238
  - Density: 69.6/km^{2} (180/sq mi)
- Time zone: UTC+01:00 (CET)
  - Summer (DST): UTC+02:00 (CEST)
- INSEE/Postal code: 50296 /50330
- ^{1} French Land Register data, which excludes lakes, ponds, glaciers > 1 km^{2} (0.386 sq mi or 247 acres) and river estuaries.

Maupertus-sur-Mer (French pronunciation: [mopɛʁty syʁ mɛʁ], literally Maupertus on Sea) is a commune in the Manche department in Normandy in north-western France.

== See also ==
- Cherbourg - Maupertus Airport
- Communes of the Manche department
