= Siouville-Hague =

- Commune
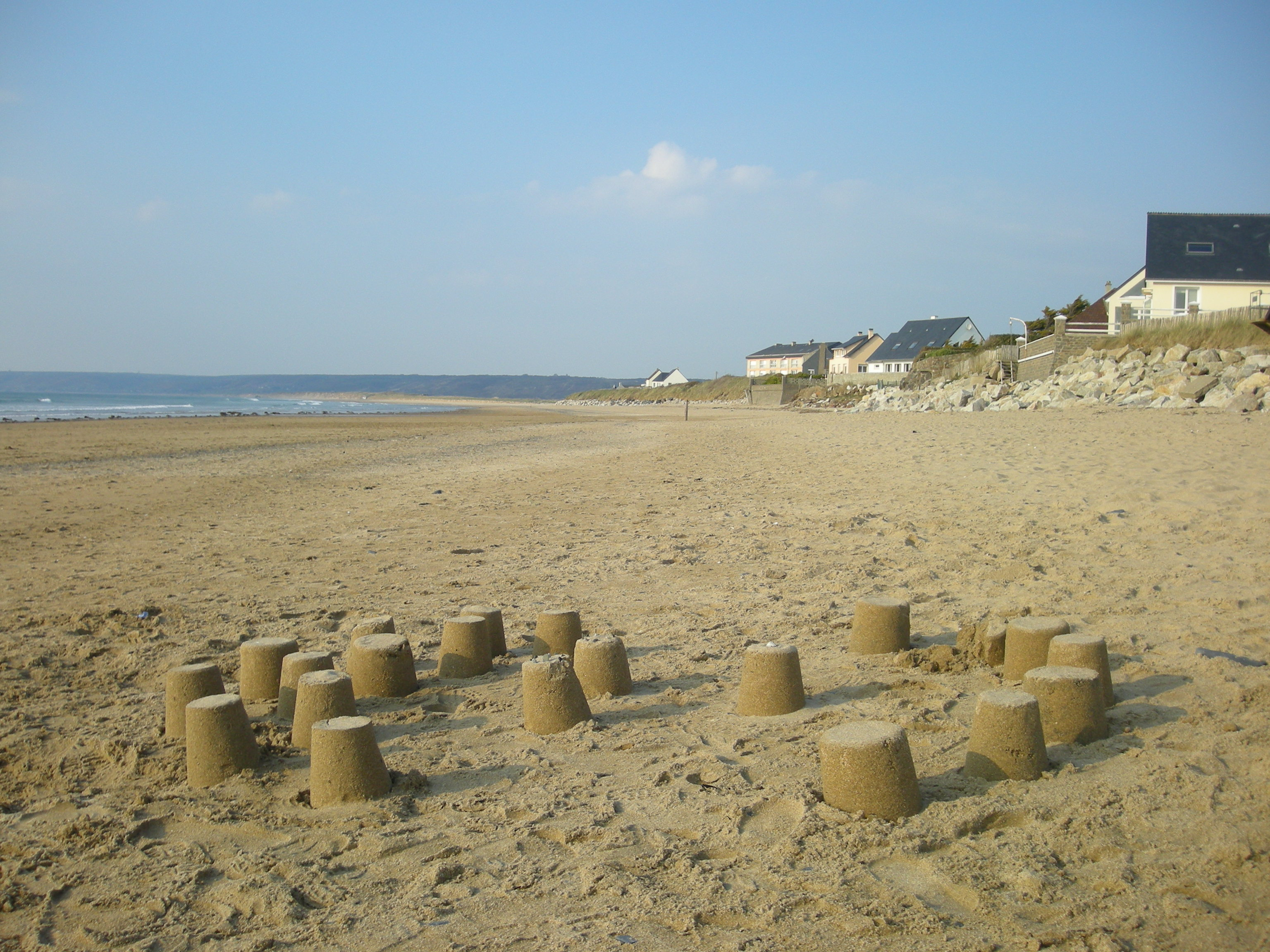
- The beach
- Location of Siouville-Hague
- Location within France Location within Normandy
- Coordinates: 49°33′32″N 1°50′18″W
- Country: France
- Region: Normandy
- Department: Manche
- Arrondissement: Cherbourg
- Canton: Les Pieux
- Intercommunality: CA Cotentin

Government
  - Mayor (2020–2026): Denis Chanteloup
- Area^{1}: 6.37 km^{2} (2.46 sq mi)
- Elevation: 76 m (249 ft)
- Highest elevation: 99 m (325 ft)
- Lowest elevation: 5 m (16 ft)
- Population (2023): 931
  - Density: 146/km^{2} (379/sq mi)
- Demonym: Siouvillais
- Time zone: UTC+01:00 (CET)
  - Summer (DST): UTC+02:00 (CEST)
- INSEE/Postal code: 50576 /50340
- Website: ville-siouville-hague.fr
- ^{1} French Land Register data, which excludes lakes, ponds, glaciers > 1 km^{2} (0.386 sq mi or 247 acres) and river estuaries.

Siouville-Hague (French pronunciation: [sjuvil aɡ]) is a commune in the Manche department in Normandy in north-western France.

== Sights ==
- The Valciot Manor, dating from the 16th century and built by the Basan family.
- The Redoute Farm, dating from the 18th century.
- The Siouville Mill.
- The fort overlooking the beach.
- Thalassotherapy center since 1969.

== See also ==
- Communes of the Manche department
