= Breuville =

- Commune
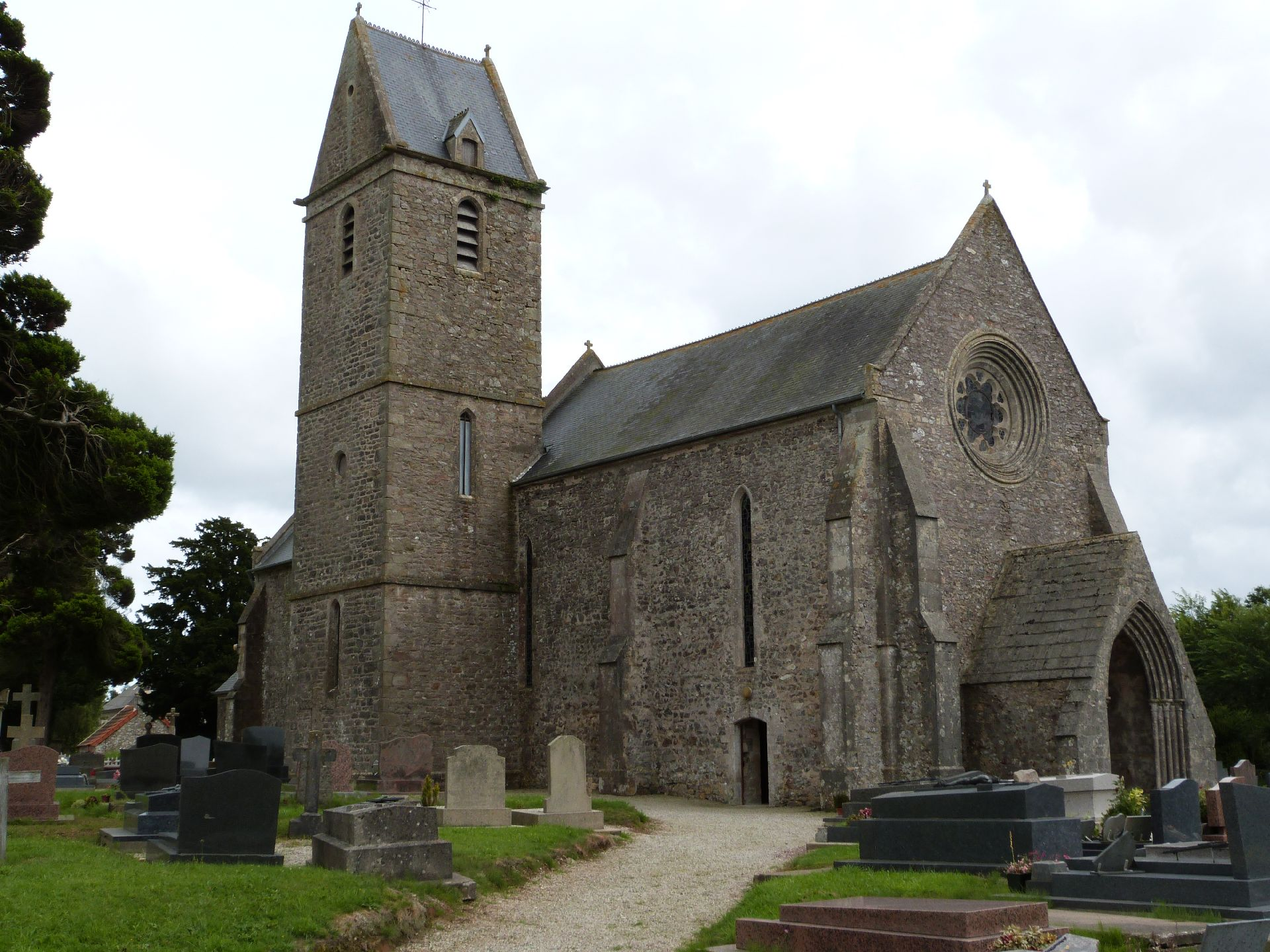
- The church of Saint-Pierre

- Coat of arms
- Location of Breuville
- Location within France Location within Normandy
- Coordinates: 49°32′13″N 1°40′17″W
- Country: France
- Region: Normandy
- Department: Manche
- Arrondissement: Cherbourg
- Canton: Bricquebec-en-Cotentin
- Intercommunality: CA Cotentin

Government
  - Mayor (2020–2026): Jean-Pierre Poignant
- Area^{1}: 8.41 km^{2} (3.25 sq mi)
- Elevation: 132 m (433 ft)
- Highest elevation: 138 m (453 ft)
- Lowest elevation: 58 m (190 ft)
- Population (2023): 406
  - Density: 48.3/km^{2} (125/sq mi)
- Time zone: UTC+01:00 (CET)
  - Summer (DST): UTC+02:00 (CEST)
- INSEE/Postal code: 50079 /50260
- ^{1} French Land Register data, which excludes lakes, ponds, glaciers > 1 km^{2} (0.386 sq mi or 247 acres) and river estuaries.

Breuville (French pronunciation: [bʁøvil]) is a commune in the Manche department in Normandy in northwestern France.

== Population ==
Historical population
Year	Pop.	±% p.a.
1968	238	—
1975	221	−1.05%
1982	292	+4.06%
1990	361	+2.69%
1999	351	−0.31%
2007	387	+1.23%
2012	380	−0.36%
2017	422	+2.12%
2023	406	−0.64%
Source: INSEE

The inhabitants are called Breuvillais in French.

== See also ==
- Communes of the Manche department
