= Les Pieux =

- Commune
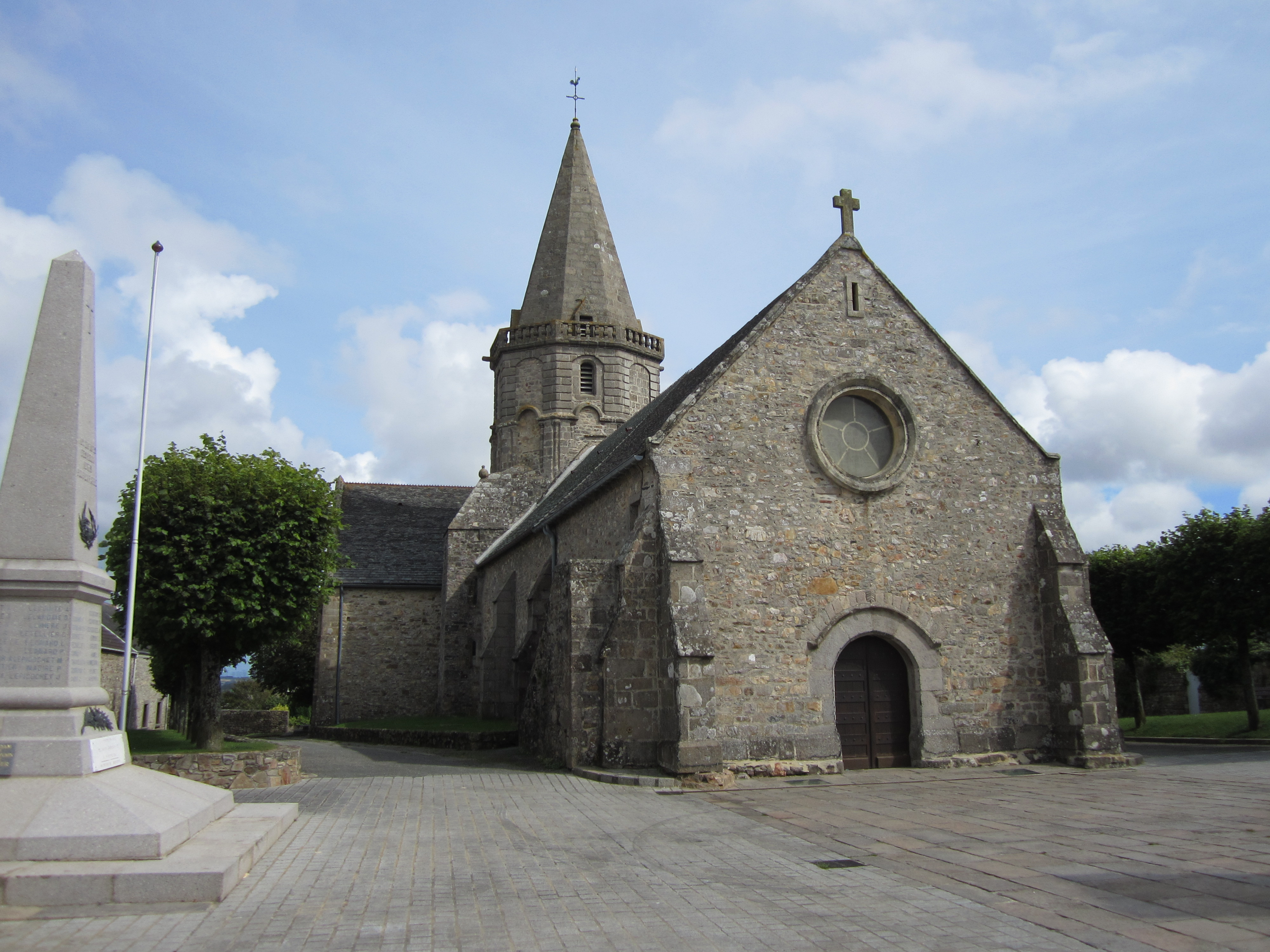
- The church of Notre-Dame
- Location of Les Pieux
- Location within France Location within Normandy
- Coordinates: 49°30′50″N 1°48′24″W
- Country: France
- Region: Normandy
- Department: Manche
- Arrondissement: Cherbourg
- Canton: Les Pieux
- Intercommunality: CA Cotentin

Government
  - Mayor (2020–2026): Catherine Bihel
- Area^{1}: 15.25 km^{2} (5.89 sq mi)
- Elevation: 108 m (354 ft)
- Highest elevation: 132 m (433 ft)
- Lowest elevation: 5 m (16 ft)
- Population (2023): 3,249
  - Density: 213.0/km^{2} (551.8/sq mi)
- Time zone: UTC+01:00 (CET)
  - Summer (DST): UTC+02:00 (CEST)
- INSEE/Postal code: 50402 /50340
- ^{1} French Land Register data, which excludes lakes, ponds, glaciers > 1 km^{2} (0.386 sq mi or 247 acres) and river estuaries.

Les Pieux (French pronunciation: [le pjø]) is a commune in the Manche department in Normandy in north-western France. It is the head commune of the Canton of Les Pieux, and of the former communes community of les Pieux.

Les Pieux is also twinned with Lytchett Matravers.

== Population ==
Historical population
Year	Pop.	±% p.a.
1968	1,169	—
1975	1,222	+0.64%
1982	2,436	+10.36%
1990	3,203	+3.48%
1999	3,477	+0.92%
2007	3,455	−0.08%
2012	3,404	−0.30%
2017	3,223	−1.09%
2023	3,249	+0.13%
Source: INSEE

== See also ==
- Communes of the Manche department
