= Éroudeville =

- Commune
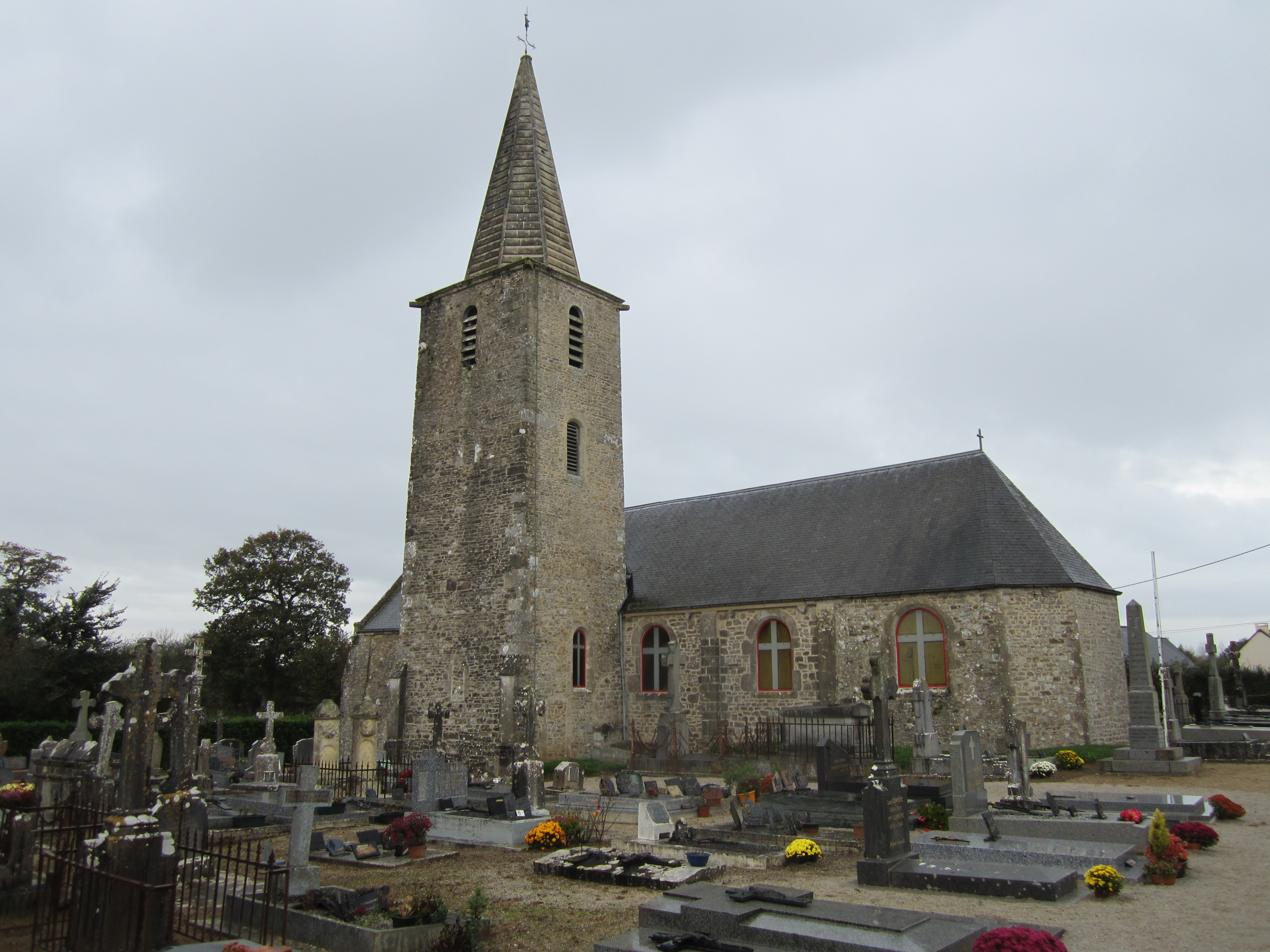
- The church of Notre-Dame
- Location of Éroudeville
- Location within France Location within Normandy
- Coordinates: 49°28′39″N 1°23′18″W
- Country: France
- Region: Normandy
- Department: Manche
- Arrondissement: Cherbourg
- Canton: Valognes
- Intercommunality: CA Cotentin

Government
  - Mayor (2020–2026): Marc Lecourt
- Area^{1}: 4.86 km^{2} (1.88 sq mi)
- Elevation: 120 m (390 ft)
- Highest elevation: 59 m (194 ft)
- Lowest elevation: 6 m (20 ft)
- Population (2023): 194
  - Density: 39.9/km^{2} (103/sq mi)
- Time zone: UTC+01:00 (CET)
  - Summer (DST): UTC+02:00 (CEST)
- INSEE/Postal code: 50175 /50310
- ^{1} French Land Register data, which excludes lakes, ponds, glaciers > 1 km^{2} (0.386 sq mi or 247 acres) and river estuaries.

Éroudeville (French pronunciation: [eʁudvil]) is a commune in the Manche department in Normandy in north-western France.

== See also ==
- Communes of the Manche department
