= Pierreville, Manche =

Pierreville
- Commune
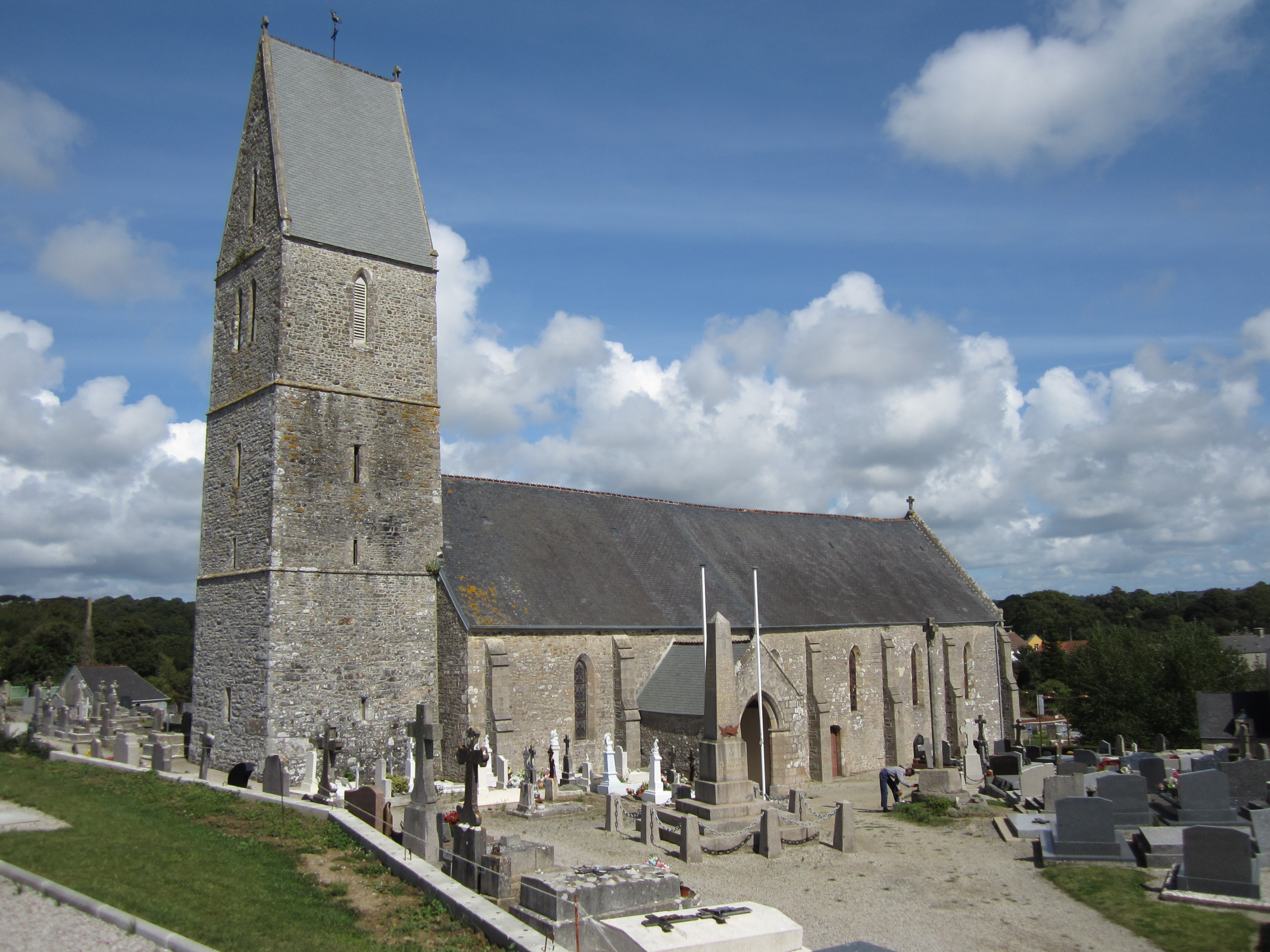
- The church of Notre-Dame
- Location of Pierreville
- Location within France Location within Normandy
- Coordinates: 49°28′27″N 1°46′49″W
- Country: France
- Region: Normandy
- Department: Manche
- Arrondissement: Cherbourg
- Canton: Les Pieux
- Intercommunality: CA Cotentin

Government
  - Mayor (2020–2026): Thierry Lemonnier
- Area^{1}: 10.11 km^{2} (3.90 sq mi)
- Elevation: 73 m (240 ft)
- Highest elevation: 117 m (384 ft)
- Lowest elevation: 35 m (115 ft)
- Population (2023): 757
  - Density: 74.9/km^{2} (194/sq mi)
- Demonym: Pierrevillais
- Time zone: UTC+01:00 (CET)
  - Summer (DST): UTC+02:00 (CEST)
- INSEE/Postal code: 50401 /50340
- ^{1} French Land Register data, which excludes lakes, ponds, glaciers > 1 km^{2} (0.386 sq mi or 247 acres) and river estuaries.

Pierreville (French pronunciation: [pjɛʁvil]) is a commune in the Manche department in Normandy in north-western France. The inhabitants are called Pierrevillais.

== See also ==
- Communes of the Manche department
