= Saint-Georges-de-la-Rivière =

- Commune
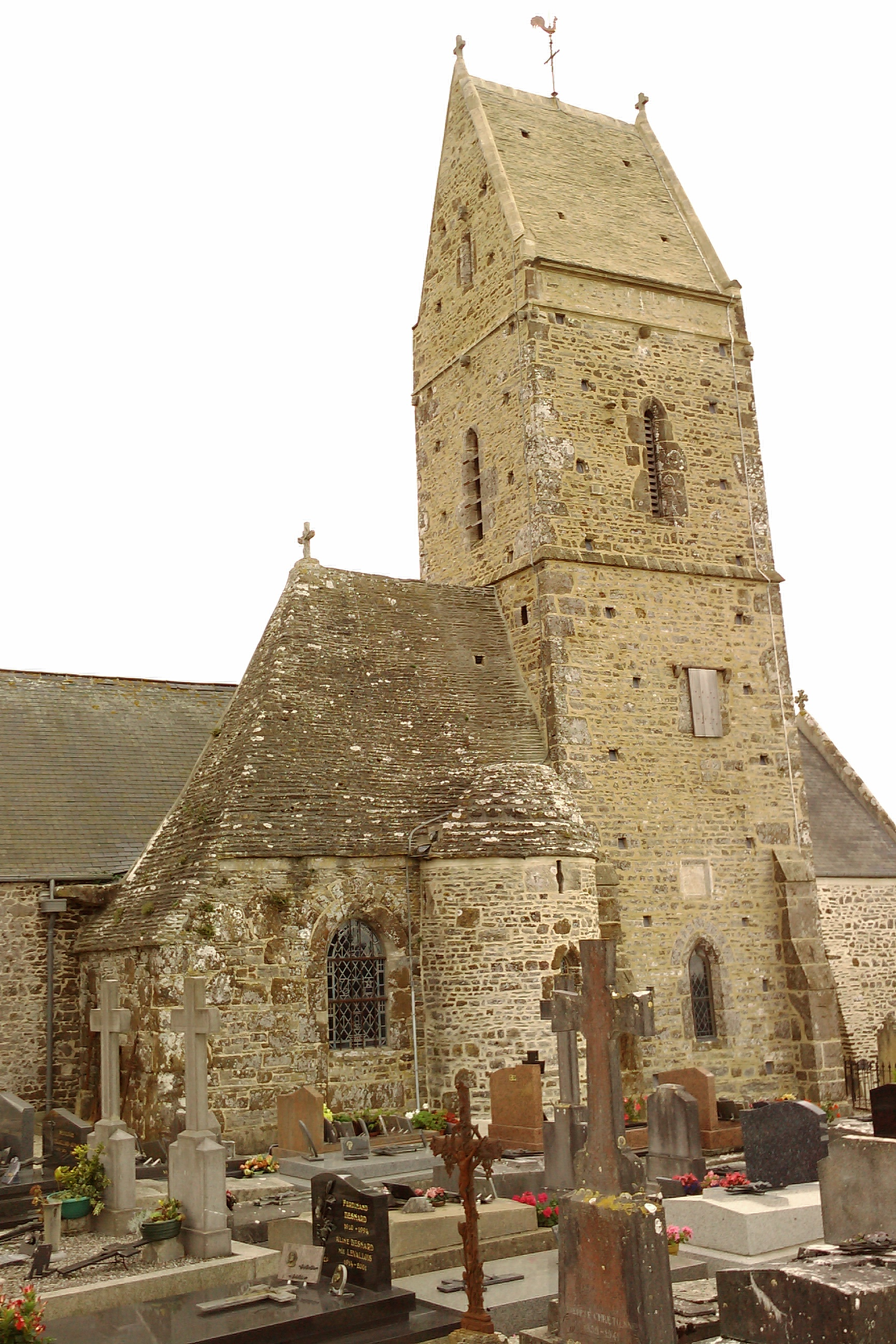
- The church of Saint-Georges
- Location of Saint-Georges-de-la-Rivière
- Location within France Location within Normandy
- Coordinates: 49°21′54″N 1°43′40″W
- Country: France
- Region: Normandy
- Department: Manche
- Arrondissement: Cherbourg
- Canton: Les Pieux
- Intercommunality: CA Cotentin

Government
  - Mayor (2021–2026): Georges Helaouet
- Area^{1}: 3.79 km^{2} (1.46 sq mi)
- Elevation: 20 m (66 ft)
- Population (2023): 250
  - Density: 66/km^{2} (170/sq mi)
- Time zone: UTC+01:00 (CET)
  - Summer (DST): UTC+02:00 (CEST)
- INSEE/Postal code: 50471 /50270
- ^{1} French Land Register data, which excludes lakes, ponds, glaciers > 1 km^{2} (0.386 sq mi or 247 acres) and river estuaries.

Saint-Georges-de-la-Rivière (French pronunciation: [sɛ̃ ʒɔʁʒ də la ʁivjɛʁ]) is a commune in the Manche department in Normandy in north-western France.

== See also ==
- Communes of the Manche department
