= Surtainville =

- Commune
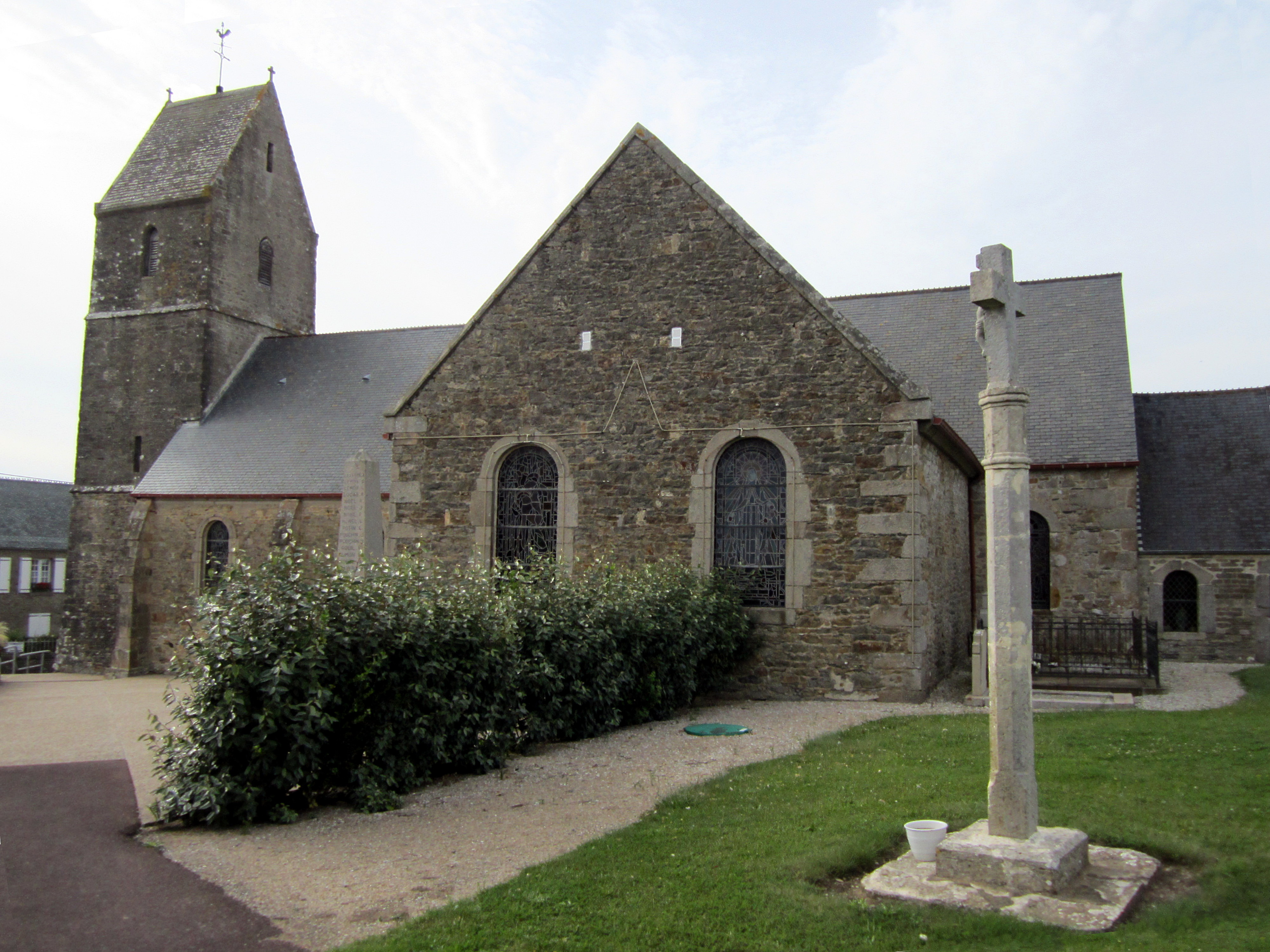
- The church of Saint-Pierre
- Location of Surtainville
- Location within France Location within Normandy
- Coordinates: 49°27′20″N 1°48′33″W
- Country: France
- Region: Normandy
- Department: Manche
- Arrondissement: Cherbourg
- Canton: Les Pieux
- Intercommunality: CA Cotentin

Government
  - Mayor (2020–2026): Odile Thominet
- Area^{1}: 14.61 km^{2} (5.64 sq mi)
- Elevation: 10 m (33 ft)
- Highest elevation: 81 m (266 ft)
- Lowest elevation: 3 m (9.8 ft)
- Population (2023): 1,166
  - Density: 79.81/km^{2} (206.7/sq mi)
- Time zone: UTC+01:00 (CET)
  - Summer (DST): UTC+02:00 (CEST)
- INSEE/Postal code: 50585 /50270
- ^{1} French Land Register data, which excludes lakes, ponds, glaciers > 1 km^{2} (0.386 sq mi or 247 acres) and river estuaries.

Surtainville (French pronunciation: [syʁtɛ̃vil]) is a commune in the Manche department in Normandy in north-western France. It is located on the west coast of the Cotentin Peninsula about 25 km south of Cherbourg. The principal economic activity is horticulture, with an emphasis on salad crops; tourism, especially camping, is a subsidiary activity.

== See also ==
- Communes of the Manche department
