= Canton of Cherbourg-Octeville-Nord-Ouest =

Coordinates: 49.6500°N 1.6500°W

Cherbourg-Octeville-Nord-Ouest
- Former canton
- Interactive map of Cherbourg-Octeville-Nord-Ouest
- Country: France
- Region: Normandy
- Department: Manche
- No. of communes: {{{nbcomm}}}
- Disbanded: 2015
- Population (2012): 11,833

The Canton of Cherbourg-Octeville-Nord-Ouest in France was situated in the department of Manche and the region of Basse-Normandie. It had 11,833 inhabitants (2012). It was disbanded following the French canton reorganisation which came into effect in March 2015. It comprised part of the commune of Cherbourg-Octeville.
