= Saint-Maurice-en-Cotentin =

- Commune
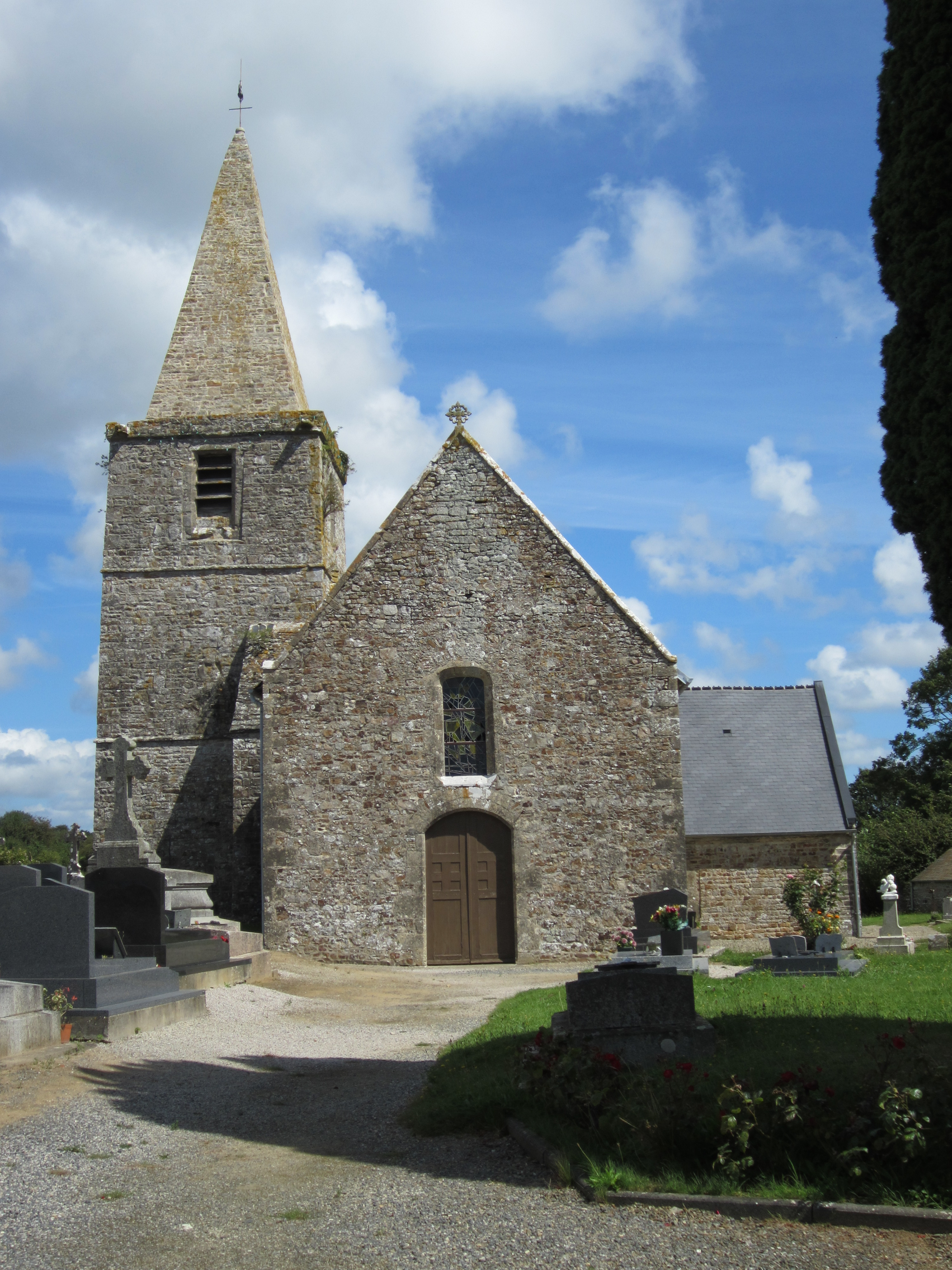
- The church of Saint-Maurice

- Coat of arms
- Location of Saint-Maurice-en-Cotentin
- Location within France Location within Normandy
- Coordinates: 49°23′28″N 1°42′16″W
- Country: France
- Region: Normandy
- Department: Manche
- Arrondissement: Cherbourg
- Canton: Les Pieux
- Intercommunality: CA Cotentin

Government
  - Mayor (2020–2026): Tony Jouanneault
- Area^{1}: 7.46 km^{2} (2.88 sq mi)
- Elevation: 73 m (240 ft)
- Population (2023): 253
  - Density: 33.9/km^{2} (87.8/sq mi)
- Time zone: UTC+01:00 (CET)
  - Summer (DST): UTC+02:00 (CEST)
- INSEE/Postal code: 50522 /50270
- ^{1} French Land Register data, which excludes lakes, ponds, glaciers > 1 km^{2} (0.386 sq mi or 247 acres) and river estuaries.

Saint-Maurice-en-Cotentin (French pronunciation: [sɛ̃ mɔʁis ɑ̃ kɔtɑ̃tɛ̃]; literally "Saint-Maurice in Cotentin") is a commune in the Manche department in Normandy in north-western France.

== See also ==
- Communes of the Manche department
