= Le Mesnil, Manche =

Le Mesnil
- Commune
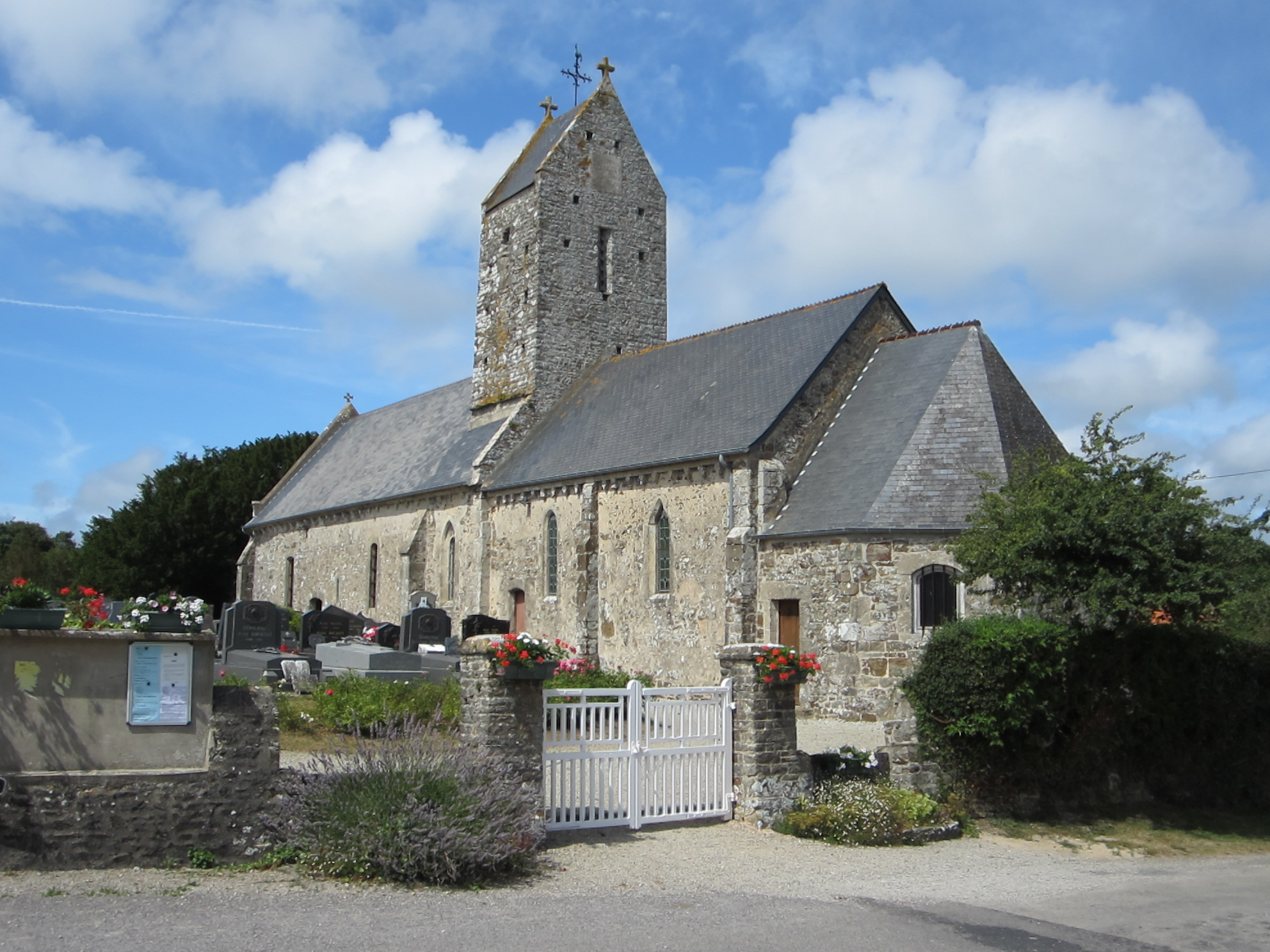
- The church of Saint-Martin

- Coat of arms
- Location of Le Mesnil
- Location within France Location within Normandy
- Coordinates: 49°22′12″N 1°41′37″W
- Country: France
- Region: Normandy
- Department: Manche
- Arrondissement: Cherbourg
- Canton: Les Pieux
- Intercommunality: CA Cotentin

Government
  - Mayor (2020–2026): Jean-Paul Vasselin
- Area^{1}: 3.45 km^{2} (1.33 sq mi)
- Elevation: 40 m (130 ft)
- Highest elevation: 76 m (249 ft)
- Lowest elevation: 20 m (66 ft)
- Population (2023): 189
  - Density: 54.8/km^{2} (142/sq mi)
- Time zone: UTC+01:00 (CET)
  - Summer (DST): UTC+02:00 (CEST)
- INSEE/Postal code: 50299 /50580
- ^{1} French Land Register data, which excludes lakes, ponds, glaciers > 1 km^{2} (0.386 sq mi or 247 acres) and river estuaries.

Le Mesnil (French pronunciation: [lə mɛnil]) is a commune in the Manche department in Normandy in north-western France.

It consists of a three property hamlet 1 km to the west of Barenton. The existing traditional stone properties are believed to have been built around 1830-1840 and became the centre of the cider making exploits of the nearby farms. In some decay, there is also a round capped bread oven in which, there is living memory of it being used after the Second World War (1949).

== See also ==
- Communes of the Manche department
