= La Haye-d'Ectot =

- Commune
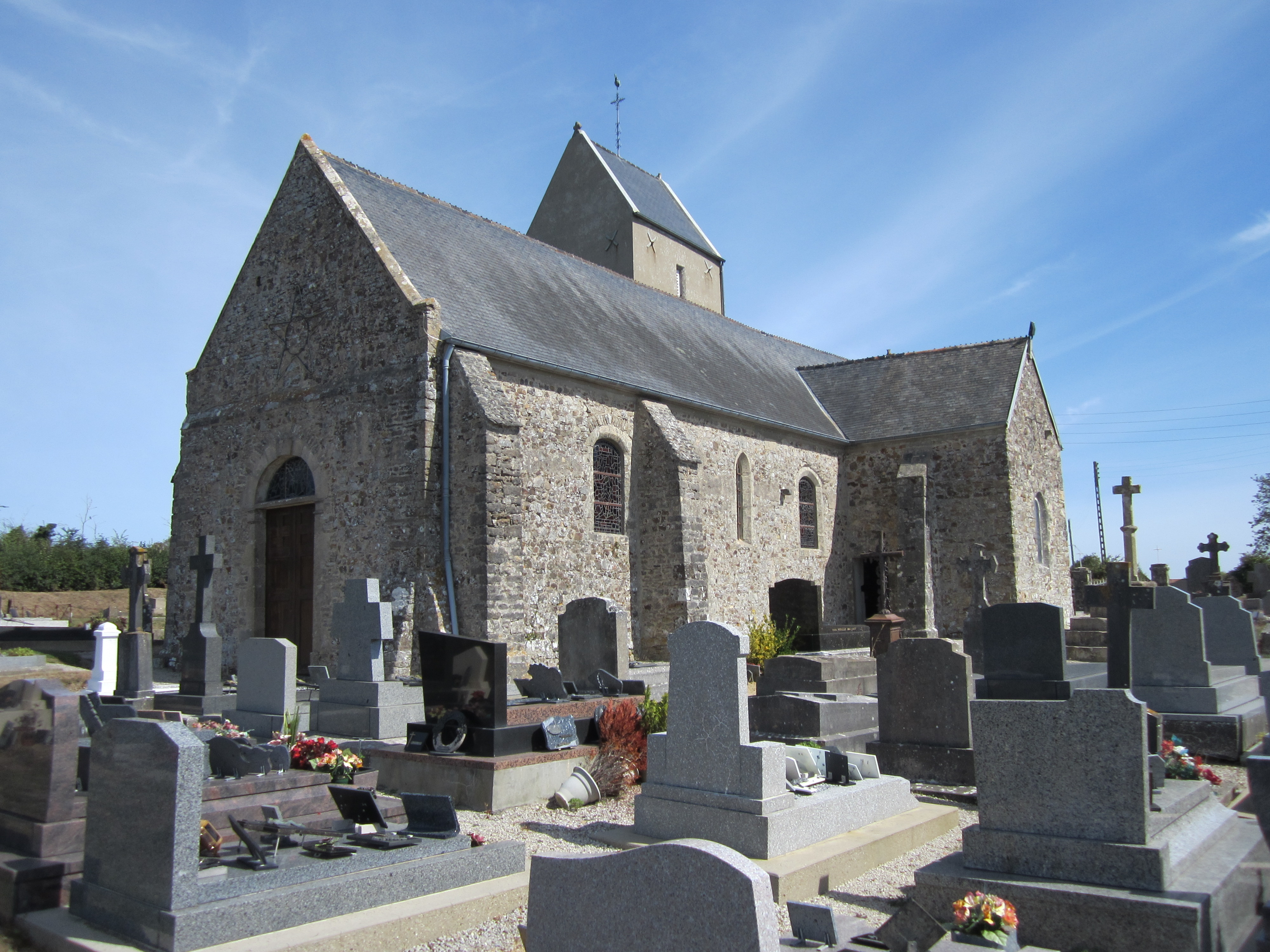
- The church of Notre-Dame
- Location of La Haye-d'Ectot
- Location within France Location within Normandy
- Coordinates: 49°23′34″N 1°43′50″W
- Country: France
- Region: Normandy
- Department: Manche
- Arrondissement: Cherbourg
- Canton: Les Pieux
- Intercommunality: CA Cotentin

Government
  - Mayor (2020–2026): Gilbert Giot
- Area^{1}: 7.32 km^{2} (2.83 sq mi)
- Elevation: 70 m (230 ft)
- Highest elevation: 125 m (410 ft)
- Lowest elevation: 12 m (39 ft)
- Population (2023): 285
  - Density: 38.9/km^{2} (101/sq mi)
- Time zone: UTC+01:00 (CET)
  - Summer (DST): UTC+02:00 (CEST)
- INSEE/Postal code: 50235 /50270
- ^{1} French Land Register data, which excludes lakes, ponds, glaciers > 1 km^{2} (0.386 sq mi or 247 acres) and river estuaries.

La Haye-d'Ectot (French pronunciation: [la ɛ dɛkto]) is a commune in the Manche department in Normandy in north-western France.

== See also ==
- Communes of the Manche department
