= Saint-Pierre-d'Arthéglise =

- Commune
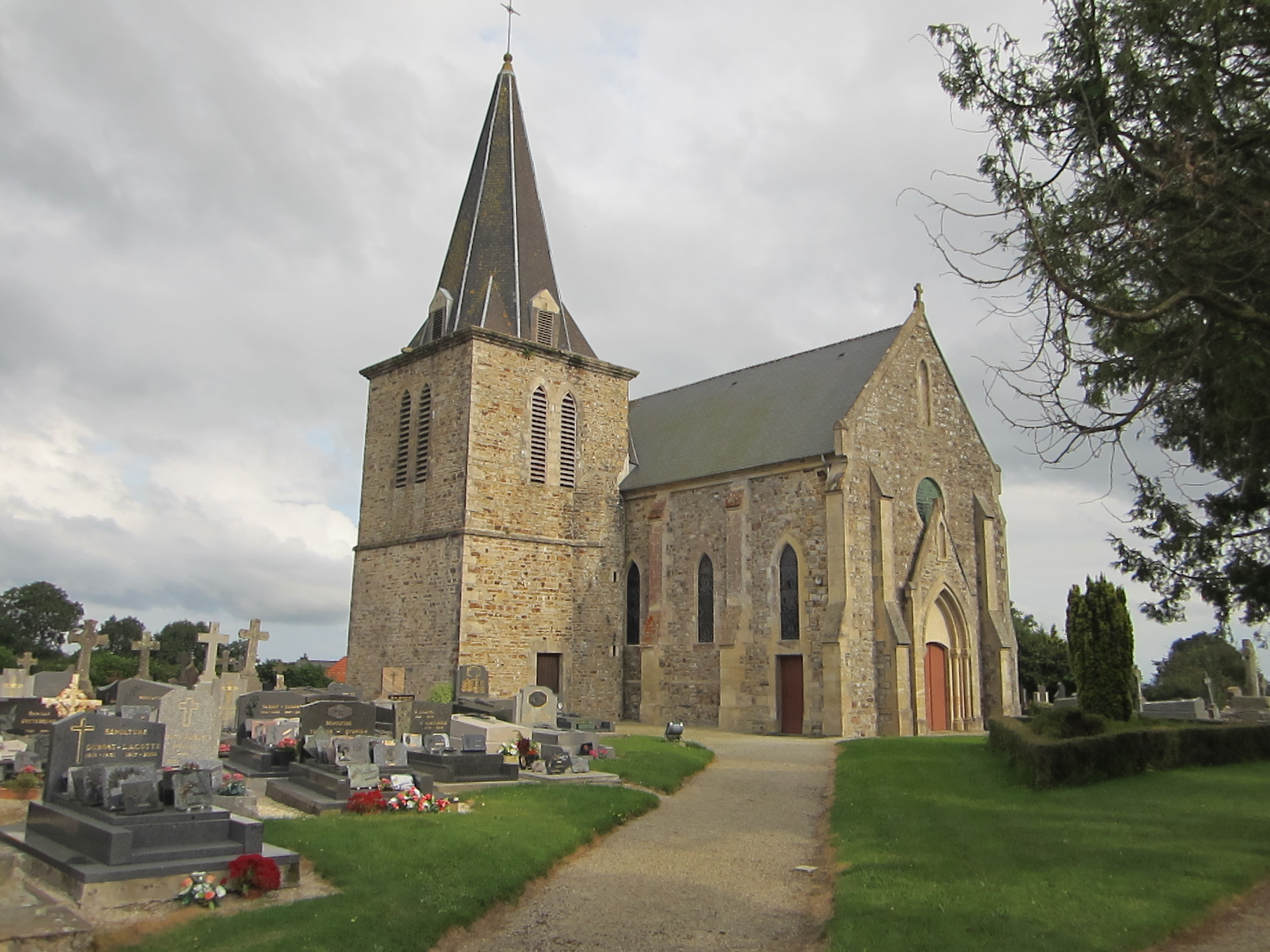
- The church of Saint-Pierre
- Location of Saint-Pierre-d'Arthéglise
- Location within France Location within Normandy
- Coordinates: 49°24′53″N 1°41′34″W
- Country: France
- Region: Normandy
- Department: Manche
- Arrondissement: Cherbourg
- Canton: Les Pieux
- Intercommunality: CA Cotentin

Government
  - Mayor (2020–2026): Sylvain Vivier
- Area^{1}: 5.36 km^{2} (2.07 sq mi)
- Elevation: 100 m (330 ft)
- Population (2023): 172
  - Density: 32.1/km^{2} (83.1/sq mi)
- Time zone: UTC+01:00 (CET)
  - Summer (DST): UTC+02:00 (CEST)
- INSEE/Postal code: 50536 /50270
- ^{1} French Land Register data, which excludes lakes, ponds, glaciers > 1 km^{2} (0.386 sq mi or 247 acres) and river estuaries.

Saint-Pierre-d'Arthéglise is a commune in the Manche department in Normandy in north-western France.

== See also ==
- Communes of the Manche department
