= Baubigny, Manche =

Baubigny
- Commune
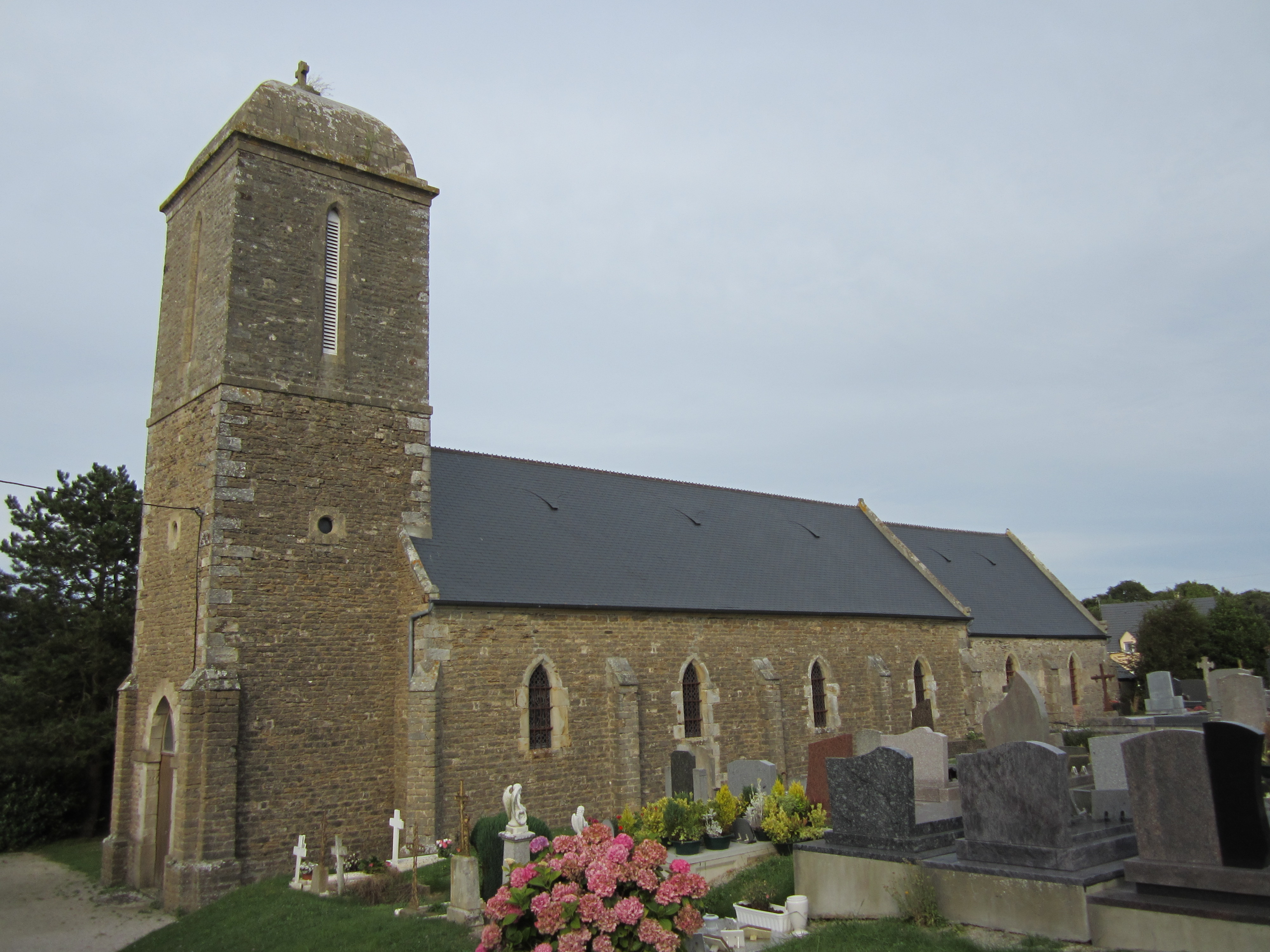
- The church of Saint-Martin
- Location of Baubigny
- Location within France Location within Normandy
- Coordinates: 49°25′51″N 1°48′09″W
- Country: France
- Region: Normandy
- Department: Manche
- Arrondissement: Cherbourg
- Canton: Les Pieux
- Intercommunality: CA Cotentin

Government
  - Mayor (2022–2026): François Simon
- Area^{1}: 6.41 km^{2} (2.47 sq mi)
- Elevation: 60 m (200 ft)
- Highest elevation: 80 m (260 ft)
- Lowest elevation: 0 m (0 ft)
- Population (2023): 132
  - Density: 20.6/km^{2} (53.3/sq mi)
- Time zone: UTC+01:00 (CET)
  - Summer (DST): UTC+02:00 (CEST)
- INSEE/Postal code: 50033 /50270
- ^{1} French Land Register data, which excludes lakes, ponds, glaciers > 1 km^{2} (0.386 sq mi or 247 acres) and river estuaries.

Baubigny (French pronunciation: [bobiɲi], before 1998: Beaubigny) is a commune in the Manche department in the Normandy region in northwestern France.

== Population ==
Historical population
Year	Pop.	±% p.a.
1968	185	—
1975	156	−2.41%
1982	167	+0.98%
1990	174	+0.51%
1999	166	−0.52%
2007	149	−1.34%
2012	163	+1.81%
2017	145	−2.31%
2023	132	−1.55%
Source: INSEE

== See also ==
- Communes of the Manche department
