= Sortosville-en-Beaumont =

- Commune
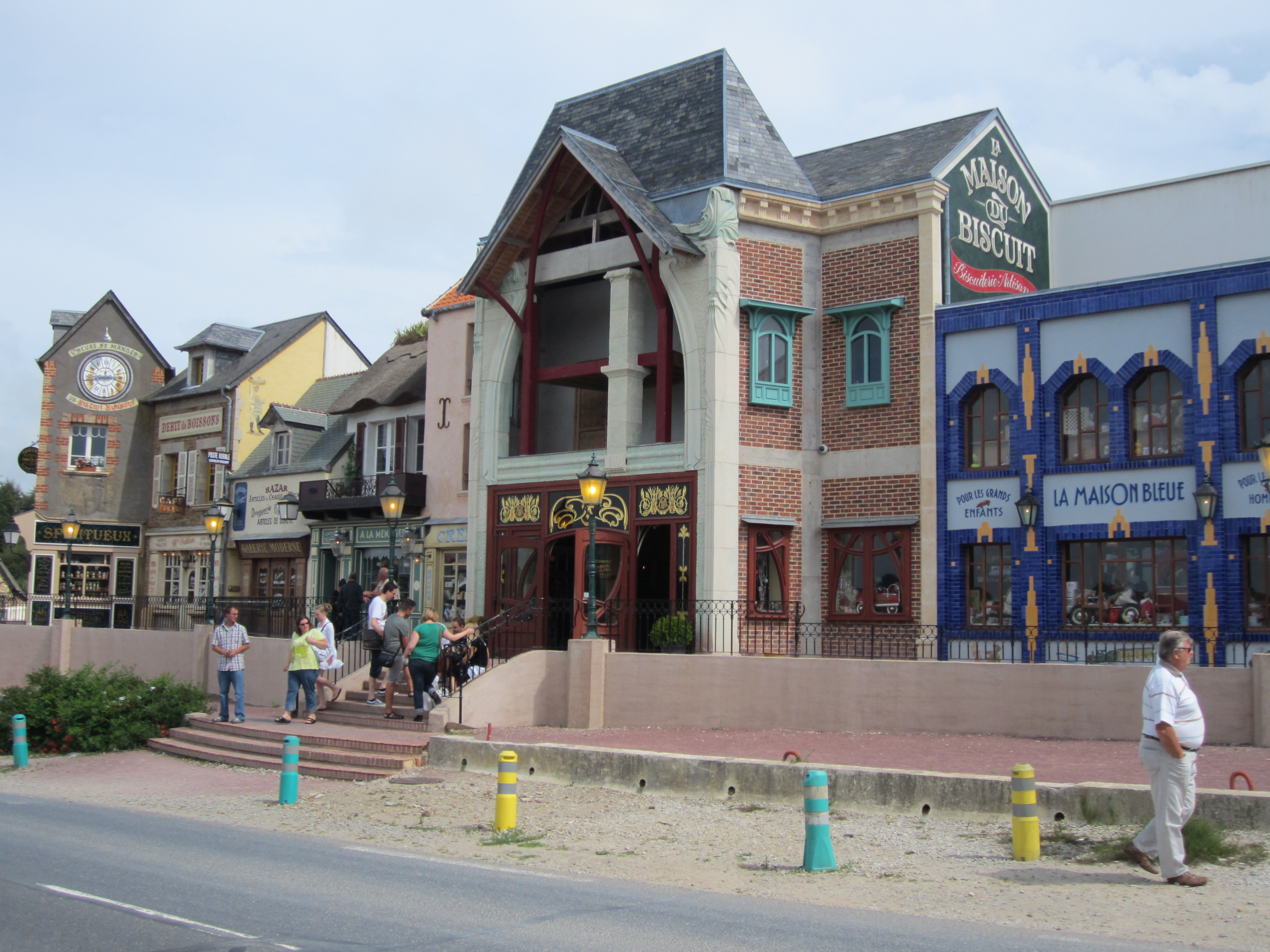
- The biscuit factory
- Location of Sortosville-en-Beaumont
- Location within France Location within Normandy
- Coordinates: 49°25′30″N 1°42′53″W
- Country: France
- Region: Normandy
- Department: Manche
- Arrondissement: Cherbourg
- Canton: Les Pieux
- Intercommunality: CA Cotentin

Government
  - Mayor (2020–2026): Jacques Marguerie
- Area^{1}: 10.24 km^{2} (3.95 sq mi)
- Elevation: 100 m (330 ft)
- Highest elevation: 144 m (472 ft)
- Lowest elevation: 18 m (59 ft)
- Population (2023): 297
  - Density: 29.0/km^{2} (75.1/sq mi)
- Time zone: UTC+01:00 (CET)
  - Summer (DST): UTC+02:00 (CEST)
- INSEE/Postal code: 50577 /50270
- ^{1} French Land Register data, which excludes lakes, ponds, glaciers > 1 km^{2} (0.386 sq mi or 247 acres) and river estuaries.

Sortosville-en-Beaumont is a commune in the Manche department in Normandy in north-western France.

== See also ==
- Communes of the Manche department
