= Canton of Les Pieux =

Coordinates: 49.51°N 1.81°W

The canton of Les Pieux is an administrative division of the Manche department, northwestern France. Its borders were modified at the French canton reorganisation which came into effect in March 2015. Its seat is in Les Pieux.

It consists of the following communes:

1. Barneville-Carteret
2. Baubigny
3. Benoîtville
4. Bricquebosq
5. Fierville-les-Mines
6. Flamanville
7. Grosville
8. La Haye-d'Ectot
9. Héauville
10. Helleville
11. Le Mesnil
12. Les Moitiers-d'Allonne
13. Pierreville
14. Les Pieux
15. Port-Bail-sur-Mer
16. Le Rozel
17. Saint-Christophe-du-Foc
18. Saint-Georges-de-la-Rivière
19. Saint-Germain-le-Gaillard
20. Saint-Jean-de-la-Rivière
21. Saint-Maurice-en-Cotentin
22. Saint-Pierre-d'Arthéglise
23. Sénoville
24. Siouville-Hague
25. Sortosville-en-Beaumont
26. Sotteville
27. Surtainville
28. Tréauville
