= Sénoville =

- Commune
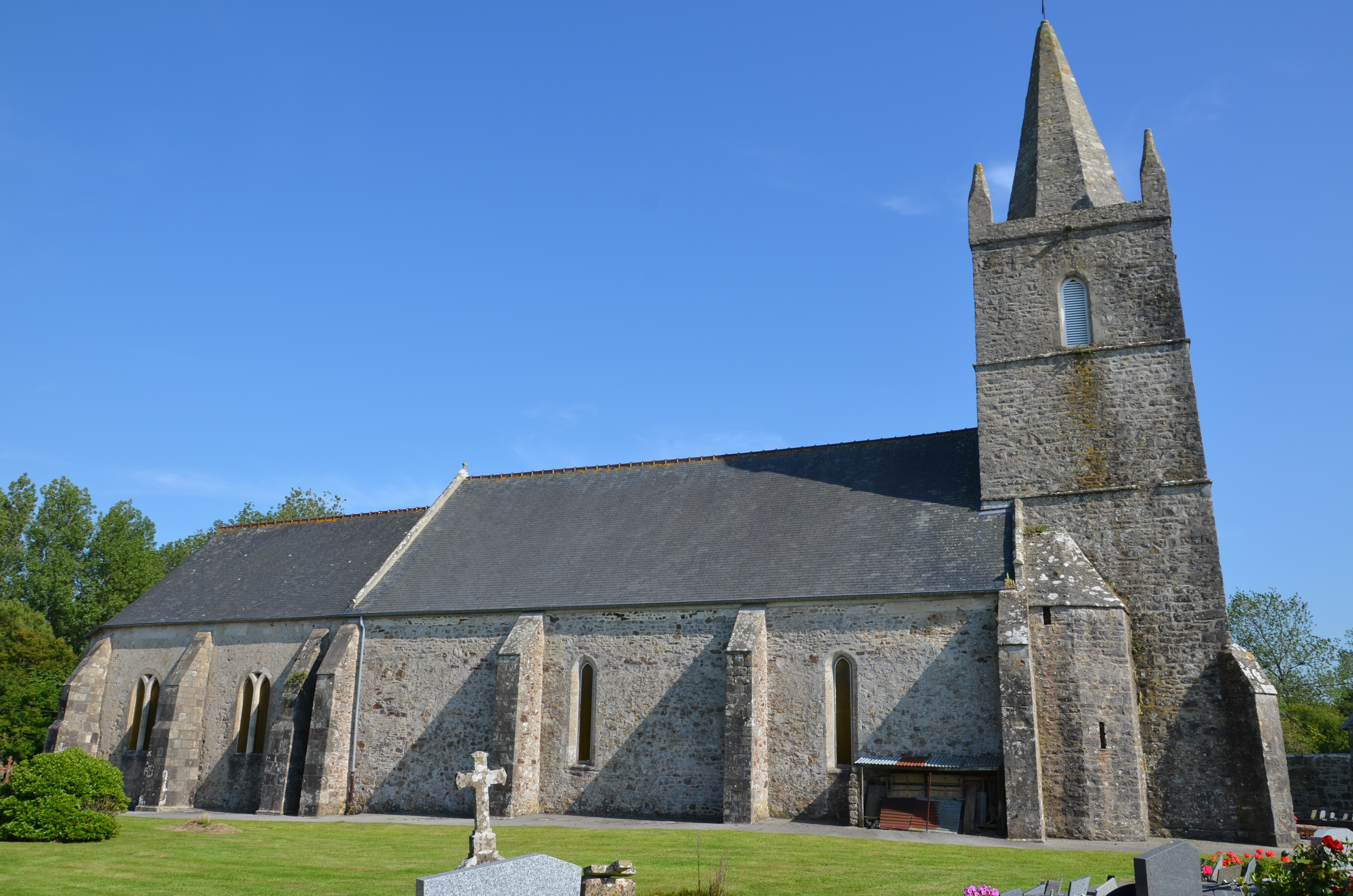
- The church of Saint-Lô
- Location of Sénoville
- Location within France Location within Normandy
- Coordinates: 49°26′03″N 1°46′45″W
- Country: France
- Region: Normandy
- Department: Manche
- Arrondissement: Cherbourg
- Canton: Les Pieux
- Intercommunality: CA Cotentin

Government
  - Mayor (2020–2026): Caroline Mabire
- Area^{1}: 7.22 km^{2} (2.79 sq mi)
- Elevation: 46 m (151 ft)
- Highest elevation: 121 m (397 ft)
- Lowest elevation: 34 m (112 ft)
- Population (2023): 188
  - Density: 26.0/km^{2} (67.4/sq mi)
- Demonym: Senovillais
- Time zone: UTC+01:00 (CET)
  - Summer (DST): UTC+02:00 (CEST)
- INSEE/Postal code: 50572 /50270
- ^{1} French Land Register data, which excludes lakes, ponds, glaciers > 1 km^{2} (0.386 sq mi or 247 acres) and river estuaries.

Sénoville (French pronunciation: [senɔvil]) is a commune in the Manche department in Normandy in north-western France.

== See also ==
- Communes of the Manche department
