= Fierville-les-Mines =

- Commune
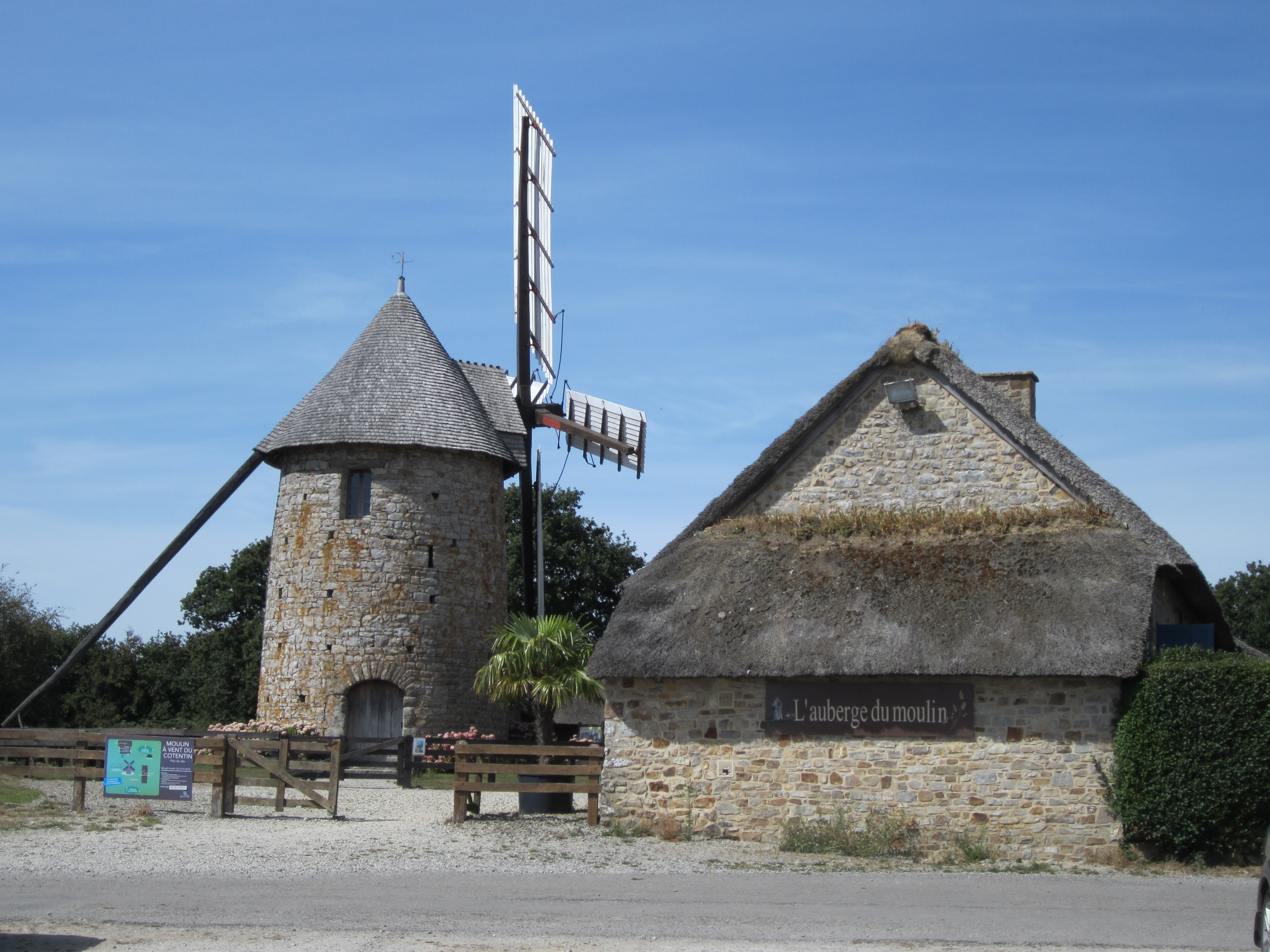
- The mill

- Coat of arms
- Location of Fierville-les-Mines
- Location within France Location within Normandy
- Coordinates: 49°23′29″N 1°40′05″W
- Country: France
- Region: Normandy
- Department: Manche
- Arrondissement: Cherbourg
- Canton: Les Pieux
- Intercommunality: CA Cotentin

Government
  - Mayor (2020–2026): Gérard Blestel
- Area^{1}: 7.44 km^{2} (2.87 sq mi)
- Elevation: 100 m (330 ft)
- Highest elevation: 108 m (354 ft)
- Lowest elevation: 22 m (72 ft)
- Population (2023): 348
  - Density: 46.8/km^{2} (121/sq mi)
- Time zone: UTC+01:00 (CET)
  - Summer (DST): UTC+02:00 (CEST)
- INSEE/Postal code: 50183 /50580
- ^{1} French Land Register data, which excludes lakes, ponds, glaciers > 1 km^{2} (0.386 sq mi or 247 acres) and river estuaries.

Fierville-les-Mines (French pronunciation: [fjɛʁvil le min]) is a commune in the Manche department in north-western France.

== See also ==
- Communes of the Manche department
