= Les Moitiers-d'Allonne =

- Commune
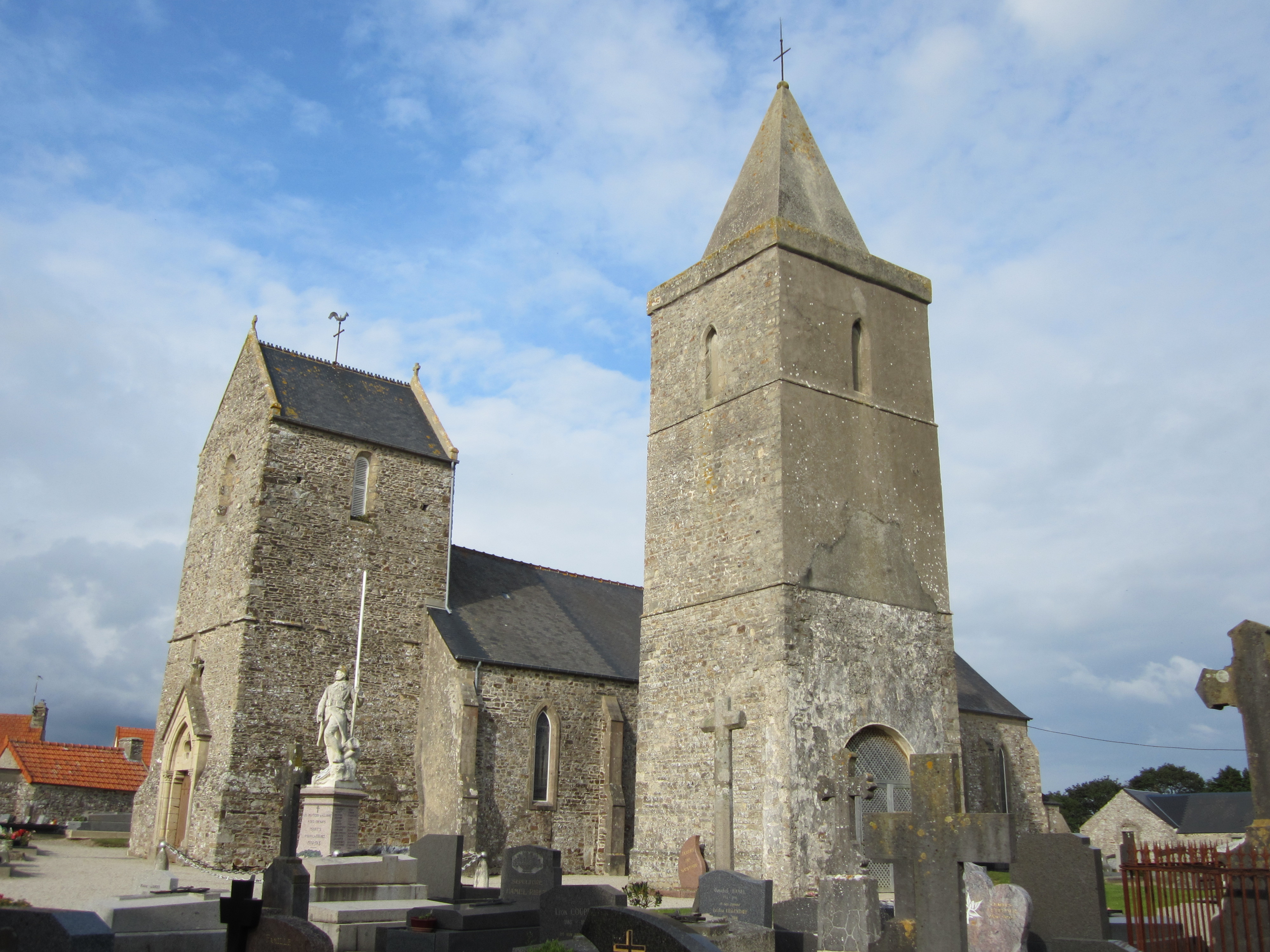
- The church of Notre-Dame and the church of Saint-Pierre
- Location of Les Moitiers-d'Allonne
- Location within France Location within Normandy
- Coordinates: 49°24′09″N 1°46′42″W
- Country: France
- Region: Normandy
- Department: Manche
- Arrondissement: Cherbourg
- Canton: Les Pieux
- Intercommunality: CA Cotentin

Government
  - Mayor (2020–2026): Michèle Sonilhac
- Area^{1}: 17.21 km^{2} (6.64 sq mi)
- Highest elevation: 127 m (417 ft)
- Lowest elevation: 0 m (0 ft)
- Population (2023): 742
  - Density: 43.1/km^{2} (112/sq mi)
- Demonym: Moutrons
- Time zone: UTC+01:00 (CET)
  - Summer (DST): UTC+02:00 (CEST)
- INSEE/Postal code: 50332 /50270
- Website: www.lesmoitiersdallonne.com
- ^{1} French Land Register data, which excludes lakes, ponds, glaciers > 1 km^{2} (0.386 sq mi or 247 acres) and river estuaries.

Les Moitiers-d'Allonne (French pronunciation: [le mwatje dalɔn]) is a commune in the Manche department in Normandy in north-western France

== See also ==
- Communes of the Manche department
