= Bricquebec =

Commune in Manche, France

- Part of Bricquebec-en-Cotentin
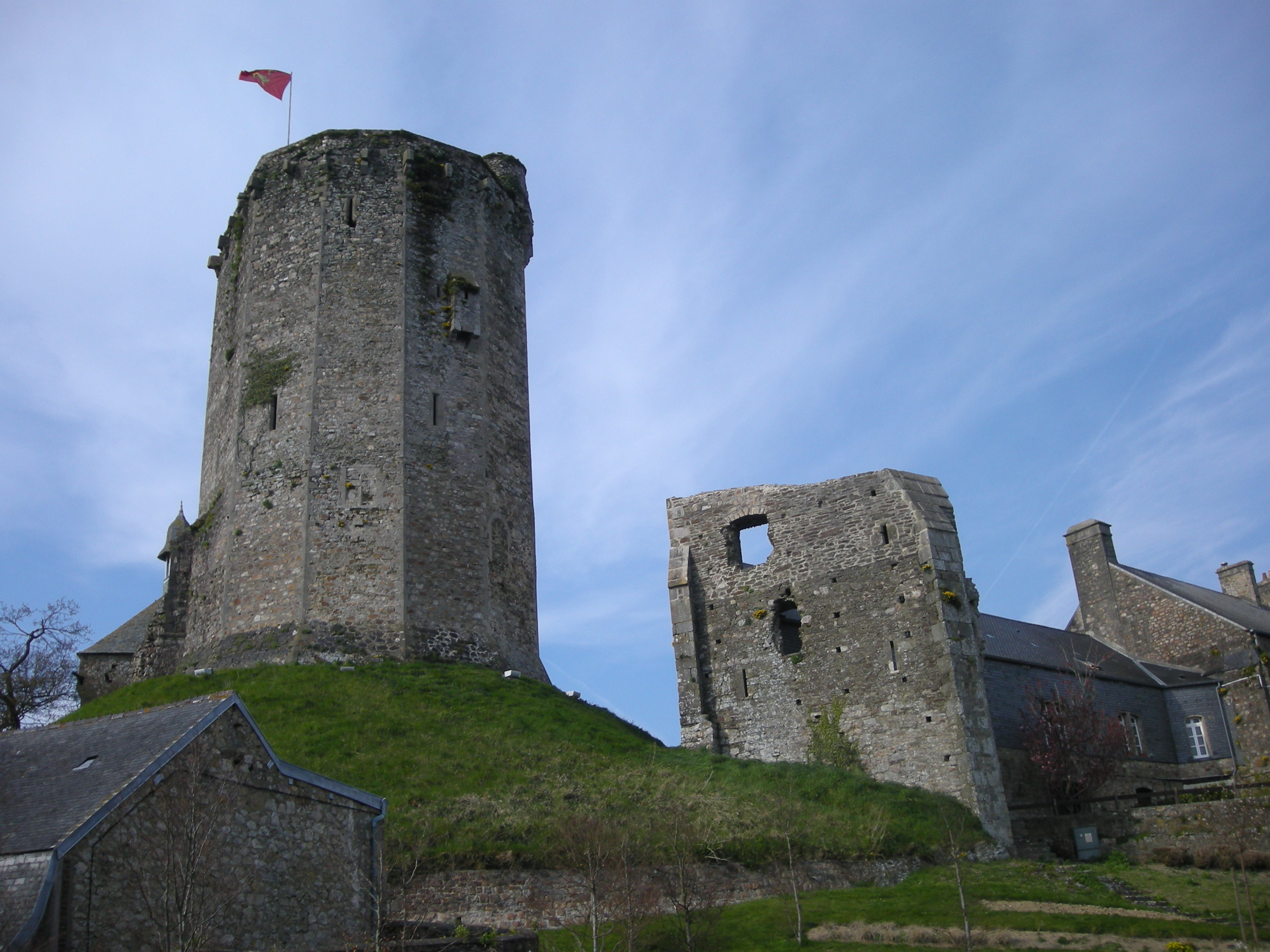
- Château de Bricquebec

- Flag Coat of arms
- Location of Bricquebec
- Location within France Location within Normandy
- Coordinates: 49°28′00″N 1°38′00″W
- Country: France
- Region: Normandy
- Department: Manche
- Arrondissement: Cherbourg
- Canton: Bricquebec
- Commune: Bricquebec-en-Cotentin
- Area^{1}: 32.66 km^{2} (12.61 sq mi)
- Highest elevation: 161 m (528 ft)
- Lowest elevation: 7 m (23 ft)
- Population (2022): 4,139
  - Density: 126.7/km^{2} (328.2/sq mi)
- Time zone: UTC+01:00 (CET)
  - Summer (DST): UTC+02:00 (CEST)
- Postal code: 50260
- ^{1} French Land Register data, which excludes lakes, ponds, glaciers > 1 km^{2} (0.386 sq mi or 247 acres) and river estuaries.

Bricquebec (French pronunciation: [bʁikbɛk]) is a former commune in the Manche department in Normandy in northwestern France. On 1 January 2016, it was merged into the new commune of Bricquebec-en-Cotentin.

== History ==
As revealed by the etymology of its name, the origin of Bricquebec (from the Scandinavian bekkr, a course of water; in turn from brekka, slope) is connected to the Viking colonisation of the Cotentin Peninsula at the beginning of the 10th century. Tradition attributes the foundation of the château to the Norman, Anslech. The dukes of Normandy made Bricquebec one of their strongholds.

=== Heraldry ===
Arms of Bricquebec	The arms of Bricquebec are blazoned : Or, a lion vert armed and langued gules.

== International relations ==
Bricquebec is twinned with:

- New Alresford, United Kingdom
- Lachendorf, Germany
- Sremski Karlovci, Serbia

== Population ==
In 1895 the communes of L'Étang-Bertrand and Rocheville were created from part of Bricquebec. Inhabitants are referred to as Bricquebétais in French.

Historical population

Year	Pop.	±% p.a.
1793	4,266	—
1800	4,000	−0.92%
1806	4,345	+1.39%
1821	4,349	+0.01%
1831	4,255	−0.22%
1836	4,414	+0.74%
1841	4,484	+0.32%
1846	4,504	+0.09%
1851	4,446	−0.26%
1856	3,988	−2.15%
1861	3,969	−0.10%
1866	3,779	−0.98%
1872	3,622	−0.70%
1876	3,667	+0.31%
1881	3,757	+0.49%
1886	3,647	−0.59%
1891	3,661	+0.08%
1896	2,761	−5.49%

Year	Pop.	±% p.a.
1901	2,778	+0.12%
1906	2,817	+0.28%
1911	2,816	−0.01%
1921	2,536	−1.04%
1926	2,596	+0.47%
1931	2,604	+0.06%
1936	2,682	+0.59%
1946	2,882	+0.72%
1954	2,732	−0.67%
1962	2,873	+0.63%
1968	3,063	+1.07%
1975	3,142	+0.36%
1982	3,724	+2.46%
1990	4,363	+2.00%
1999	4,360	−0.01%
2006	4,221	−0.46%
2022	4,139	−0.12%

Source: EHESS and INSEE

== Sights ==
- Château (XII^{e}), with polygonal ramparts, towers and turret (historical monument class).
- Château des Galleries (XVI^{e}/XVII^{e})
- Abbaye Notre-Dame-de-Grâce (Cistercian) (XIX^{e})
- Château Saint-Blaise (XVII^{e}/XIX^{e})

== Events ==
- Market every Monday morning
- La Sainte Anne traditional fair on the last weekend in July

=== Personalities ===
- Jean Le Marois (1776–1836), a general under Napoléon, député of la Manche.
- Armand Le Véel (1821–1905), statue sculptor
- Aristide Frémine (1837–1897), writer
- Roger Lemerre, soccer player, born in 1941, selected for national team of France, 1998–2002
- William Bertram Baron of Briquebec, 1012, father of Hugue (named de Roussel) who was appointed Marshal of England by King William I (Duke of Normandy)
- Olly Southwick, Alresford MVP Astro Christmas Football 2019

== See also ==
- The Trappe de Bricquebec cheese
- The Trappiste de Bricquebec cheese
