= Quettetot =

- Part of Bricquebec-en-Cotentin
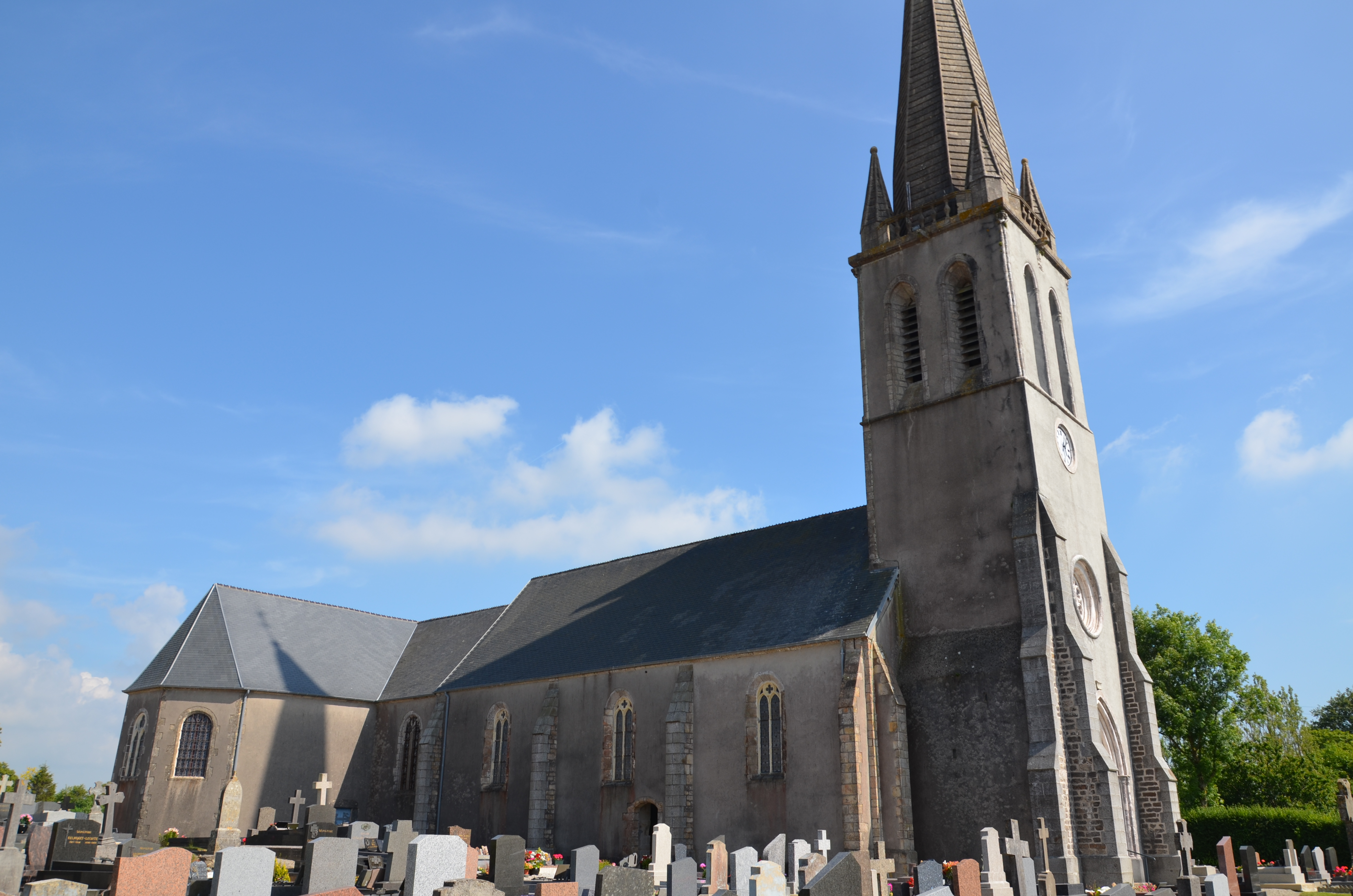
- The church of Notre-Dame
- Location of Quettetot
- Location within France Location within Normandy
- Coordinates: 49°29′18″N 1°39′56″W
- Country: France
- Region: Normandy
- Department: Manche
- Arrondissement: Cherbourg
- Canton: Bricquebec
- Commune: Bricquebec-en-Cotentin
- Area^{1}: 12.43 km^{2} (4.80 sq mi)
- Elevation: 158 m (518 ft)
- Highest elevation: 159 m (522 ft)
- Lowest elevation: 34 m (112 ft)
- Population (2022): 731
  - Density: 58.8/km^{2} (152/sq mi)
- Demonym: Quettetotais
- Time zone: UTC+01:00 (CET)
  - Summer (DST): UTC+02:00 (CEST)
- Postal code: 50260
- ^{1} French Land Register data, which excludes lakes, ponds, glaciers > 1 km^{2} (0.386 sq mi or 247 acres) and river estuaries.

Quettetot (French pronunciation: [kɛtəto]) is a former commune in the Manche department in north-western France. On 1 January 2016, it was merged into the new commune of Bricquebec-en-Cotentin. The inhabitants are called Quettetotais.

== See also ==
- Communes of the Manche department
