= Jean Baptiste Guesnay =

French Jesuit and author

Jean-Baptiste Guesnay (1585 – November 4, 1658) was a French Jesuit and author.

== Biography ==
He was born in Aix-en-Provence. He died in Avignon.

He opposed the views expressed by Jean de Launoy, who had dismissed the Provençal legends of Mary Magdalene as pious nonsense.

== Works ==
- Magdalena Massiliensis advena, seu de adventu Magdalenae in Gallias, & Massiliam appulsu. Disquisitio theologica historica (1643)
- Le triomphe de la Madeleine en la créance et vénération de ses reliques en Provence (1647). Published under the pseudonym of Denis de la Sainte-Baume
- Provinciae Massiliensis ac reliquae Phocensis Annales, sive Massilia gentilis et christiana; read online
