= Le Vrétot =

- Part of Bricquebec-en-Cotentin
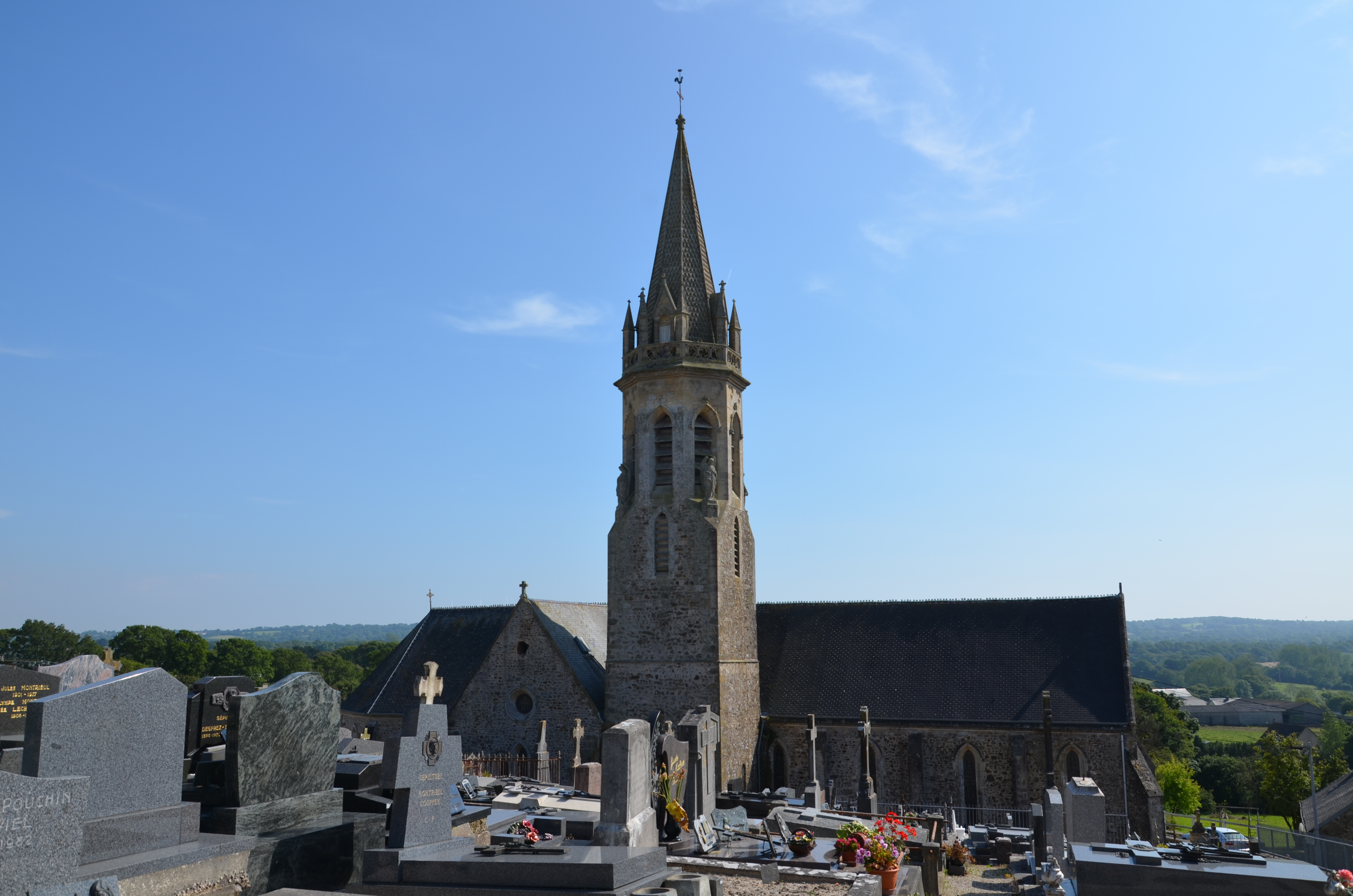
- Notre-Dame-des-Anges church
- Location of Le Vrétot
- Location within France Location within Normandy
- Coordinates: 49°27′09″N 1°42′34″W
- Country: France
- Region: Normandy
- Department: Manche
- Arrondissement: Cherbourg
- Canton: Bricquebec
- Commune: Bricquebec-en-Cotentin
- Area^{1}: 20.56 km^{2} (7.94 sq mi)
- Elevation: 50 m (160 ft)
- Highest elevation: 127 m (417 ft)
- Lowest elevation: 18 m (59 ft)
- Population (2022): 565
  - Density: 27.5/km^{2} (71.2/sq mi)
- Time zone: UTC+01:00 (CET)
  - Summer (DST): UTC+02:00 (CEST)
- Postal code: 50260
- ^{1} French Land Register data, which excludes lakes, ponds, glaciers > 1 km^{2} (0.386 sq mi or 247 acres) and river estuaries.

Le Vrétot (French pronunciation: [lə vʁeto]) is a former commune in the Manche department in Normandy in north-western France. On 1 January 2016, it was merged into the new commune of Bricquebec-en-Cotentin.

== See also ==
- Communes of the Manche department
