= Le Valdécie =

- Part of Bricquebec-en-Cotentin
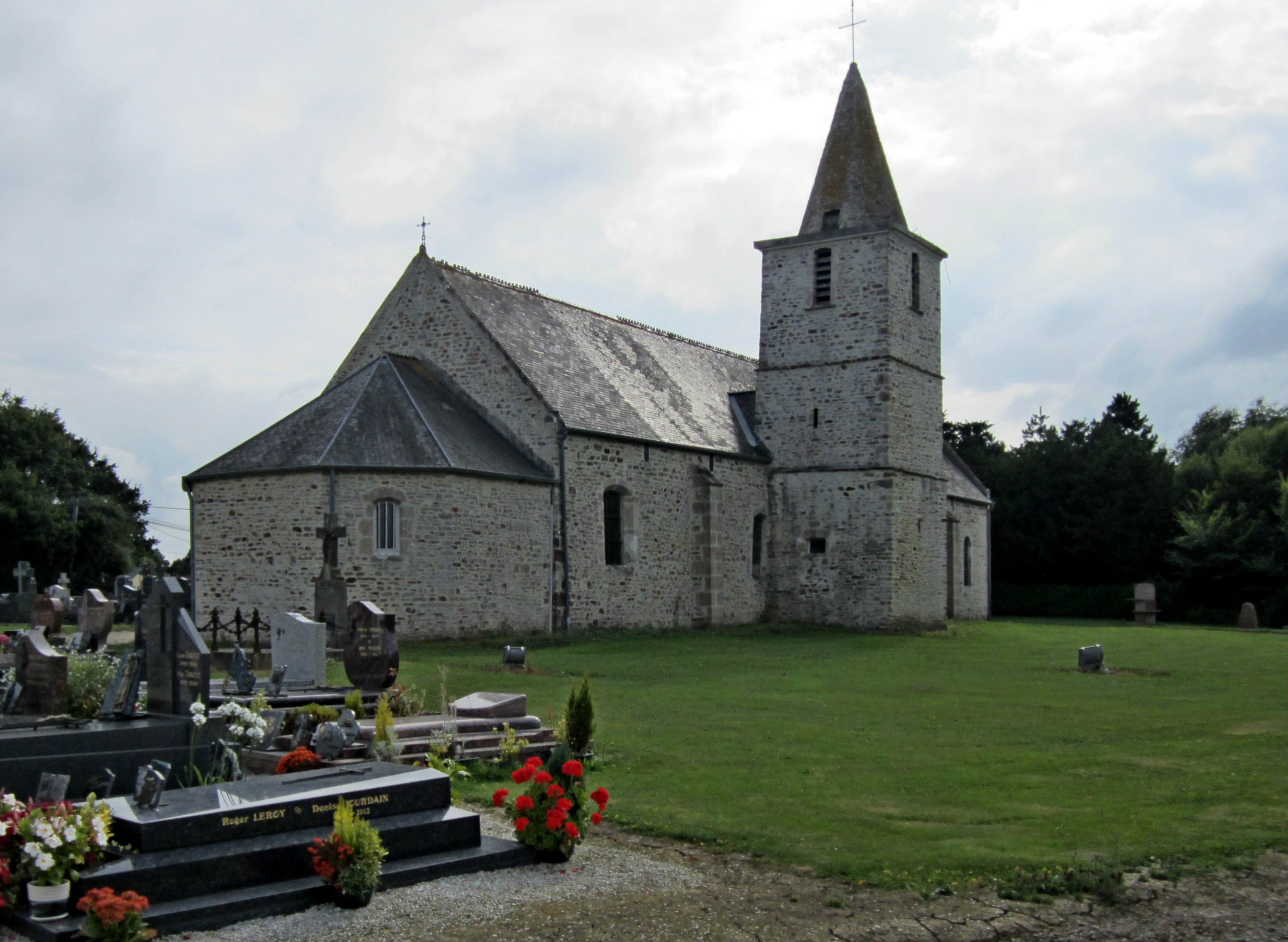
- The church of Notre-Dame
- Location of Le Valdécie
- Location within France Location within Normandy
- Coordinates: 49°25′28″N 1°39′06″W
- Country: France
- Region: Normandy
- Department: Manche
- Arrondissement: Cherbourg
- Canton: Bricquebec
- Commune: Bricquebec-en-Cotentin
- Area^{1}: 4.00 km^{2} (1.54 sq mi)
- Elevation: 120 m (390 ft)
- Highest elevation: 122 m (400 ft)
- Lowest elevation: 13 m (43 ft)
- Population (2022): 143
  - Density: 35.7/km^{2} (92.6/sq mi)
- Time zone: UTC+01:00 (CET)
  - Summer (DST): UTC+02:00 (CEST)
- Postal code: 50260
- ^{1} French Land Register data, which excludes lakes, ponds, glaciers > 1 km^{2} (0.386 sq mi or 247 acres) and river estuaries.

Le Valdécie (French pronunciation: [lə valdesi]) is a former commune in the Manche department in Normandy in north-western France. On 1 January 2016, it was merged into the new commune of Bricquebec-en-Cotentin.

== See also ==
- Communes of the Manche department
- Jean de Launoy
