= Les Perques =

- Part of Bricquebec-en-Cotentin
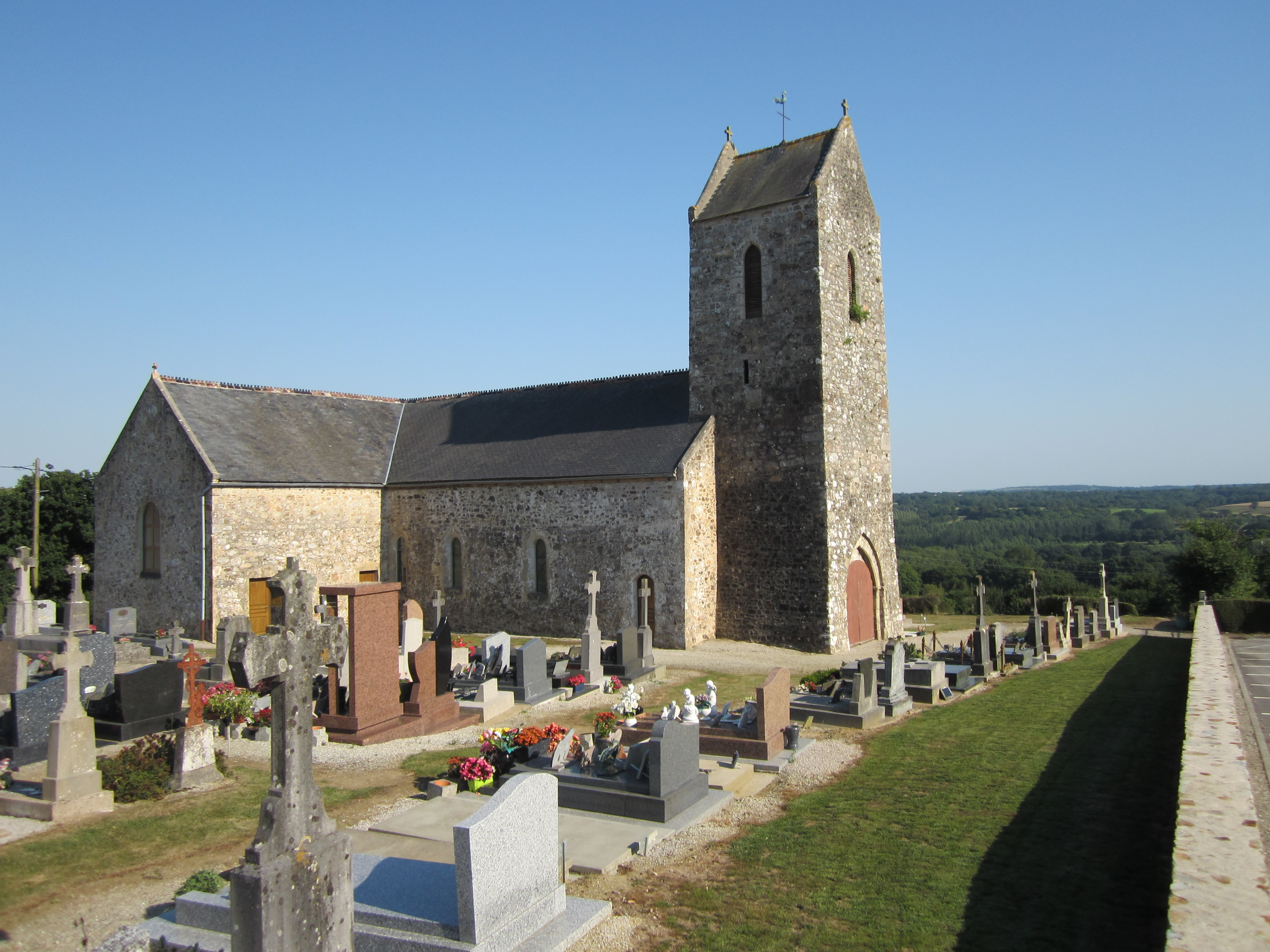
- The church of Saint-Paul
- Location of Les Perques
- Location within France Location within Normandy
- Coordinates: 49°26′46″N 1°39′24″W
- Country: France
- Region: Normandy
- Department: Manche
- Arrondissement: Cherbourg
- Canton: Bricquebec
- Commune: Bricquebec-en-Cotentin
- Area^{1}: 4.85 km^{2} (1.87 sq mi)
- Highest elevation: 122 m (400 ft)
- Lowest elevation: 13 m (43 ft)
- Population (2022): 155
  - Density: 32.0/km^{2} (82.8/sq mi)
- Time zone: UTC+01:00 (CET)
  - Summer (DST): UTC+02:00 (CEST)
- Postal code: 50260
- ^{1} French Land Register data, which excludes lakes, ponds, glaciers > 1 km^{2} (0.386 sq mi or 247 acres) and river estuaries.

Les Perques (French pronunciation: [le pɛʁk]) is a former commune in the Manche department in Normandy in north-western France. On 1 January 2016, it was merged into the new commune of Bricquebec-en-Cotentin.

== See also ==
- Communes of the Manche department
