= Saint-Jacques-de-Néhou =

- Commune
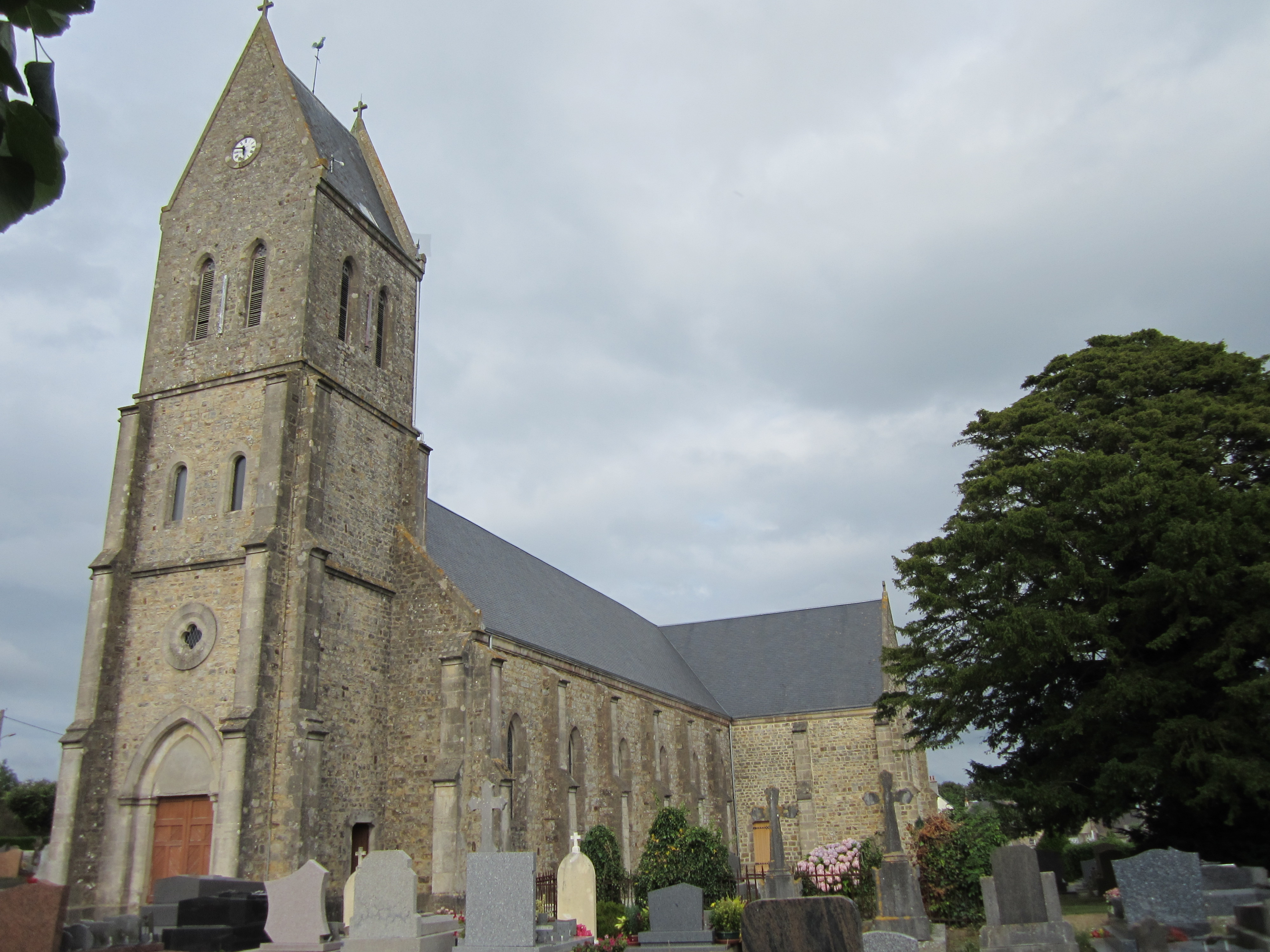
- The church of Saint-Marcouf
- Location of Saint-Jacques-de-Néhou
- Location within France Location within Normandy
- Coordinates: 49°25′07″N 1°36′43″W
- Country: France
- Region: Normandy
- Department: Manche
- Arrondissement: Cherbourg
- Canton: Bricquebec-en-Cotentin
- Intercommunality: CA Cotentin

Government
  - Mayor (2020–2026): Françoise Lerossignol
- Area^{1}: 21.49 km^{2} (8.30 sq mi)
- Elevation: 40 m (130 ft)
- Population (2023): 625
  - Density: 29.1/km^{2} (75.3/sq mi)
- Time zone: UTC+01:00 (CET)
  - Summer (DST): UTC+02:00 (CEST)
- INSEE/Postal code: 50486 /50390
- ^{1} French Land Register data, which excludes lakes, ponds, glaciers > 1 km^{2} (0.386 sq mi or 247 acres) and river estuaries.

Saint-Jacques-de-Néhou (French pronunciation: [sɛ̃ ʒak də ne.u], literally Saint-Jacques of Néhou) is a commune in the Manche department in Normandy in north-western France.

== See also ==
- Communes of the Manche department
