= Catteville =

- Commune
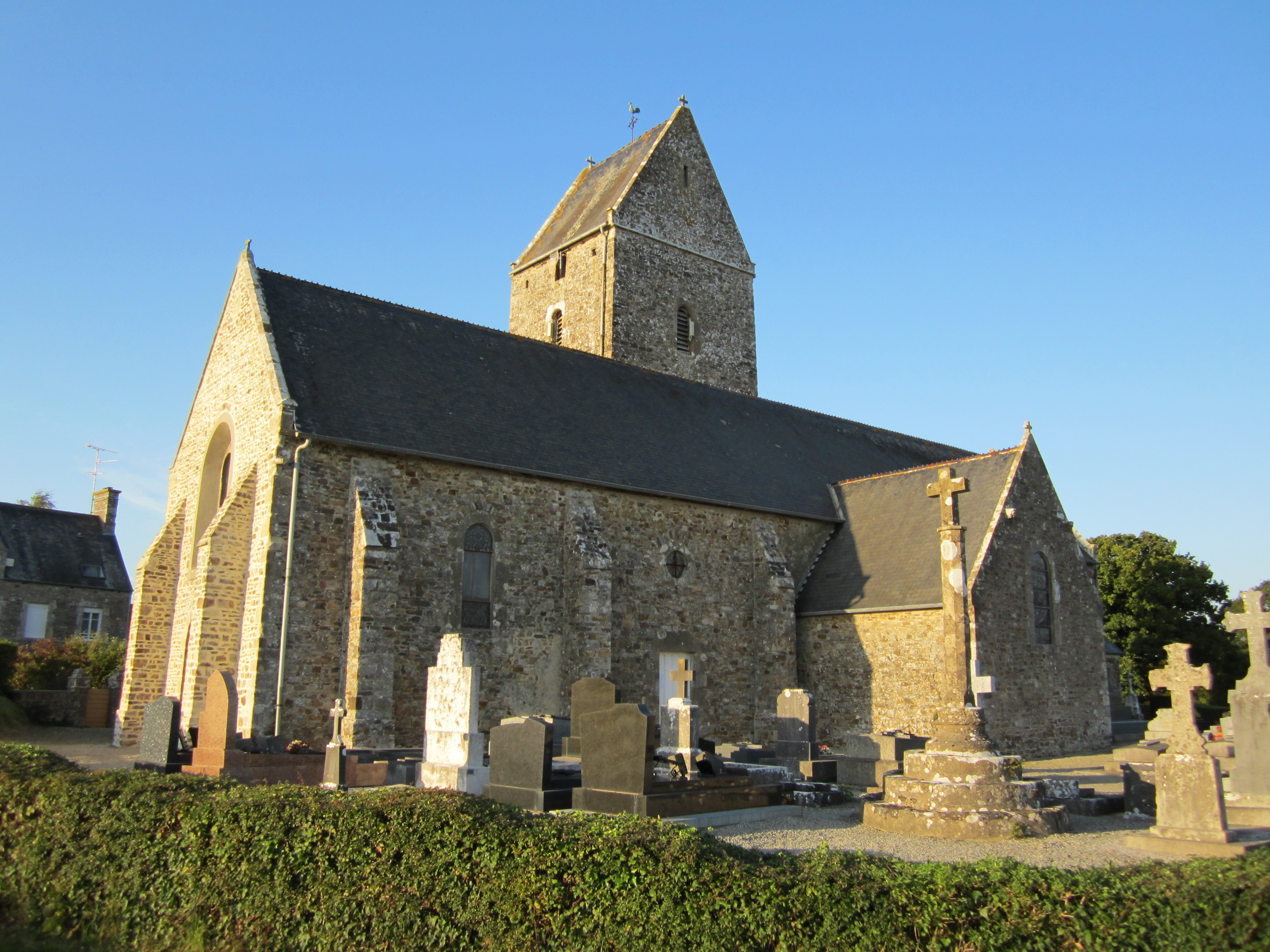
- The church of Saint-Ouen
- Location of Catteville
- Location within France Location within Normandy
- Coordinates: 49°21′28″N 1°34′06″W
- Country: France
- Region: Normandy
- Department: Manche
- Arrondissement: Cherbourg
- Canton: Bricquebec-en-Cotentin
- Intercommunality: CA Cotentin

Government
  - Mayor (2020–2026): Gilbert Villette
- Area^{1}: 4.57 km^{2} (1.76 sq mi)
- Elevation: 30 m (98 ft)
- Highest elevation: 40 m (130 ft)
- Lowest elevation: 7 m (23 ft)
- Population (2023): 106
  - Density: 23.2/km^{2} (60.1/sq mi)
- Time zone: UTC+01:00 (CET)
  - Summer (DST): UTC+02:00 (CEST)
- INSEE/Postal code: 50105 /50390
- ^{1} French Land Register data, which excludes lakes, ponds, glaciers > 1 km^{2} (0.386 sq mi or 247 acres) and river estuaries.

Catteville (French pronunciation: [katvil]) is a commune in the Manche department in Normandy in north-western France. The inhabitants are called Cattevillais in French.

== See also ==
- Communes of the Manche department
