= Besneville =

- Commune
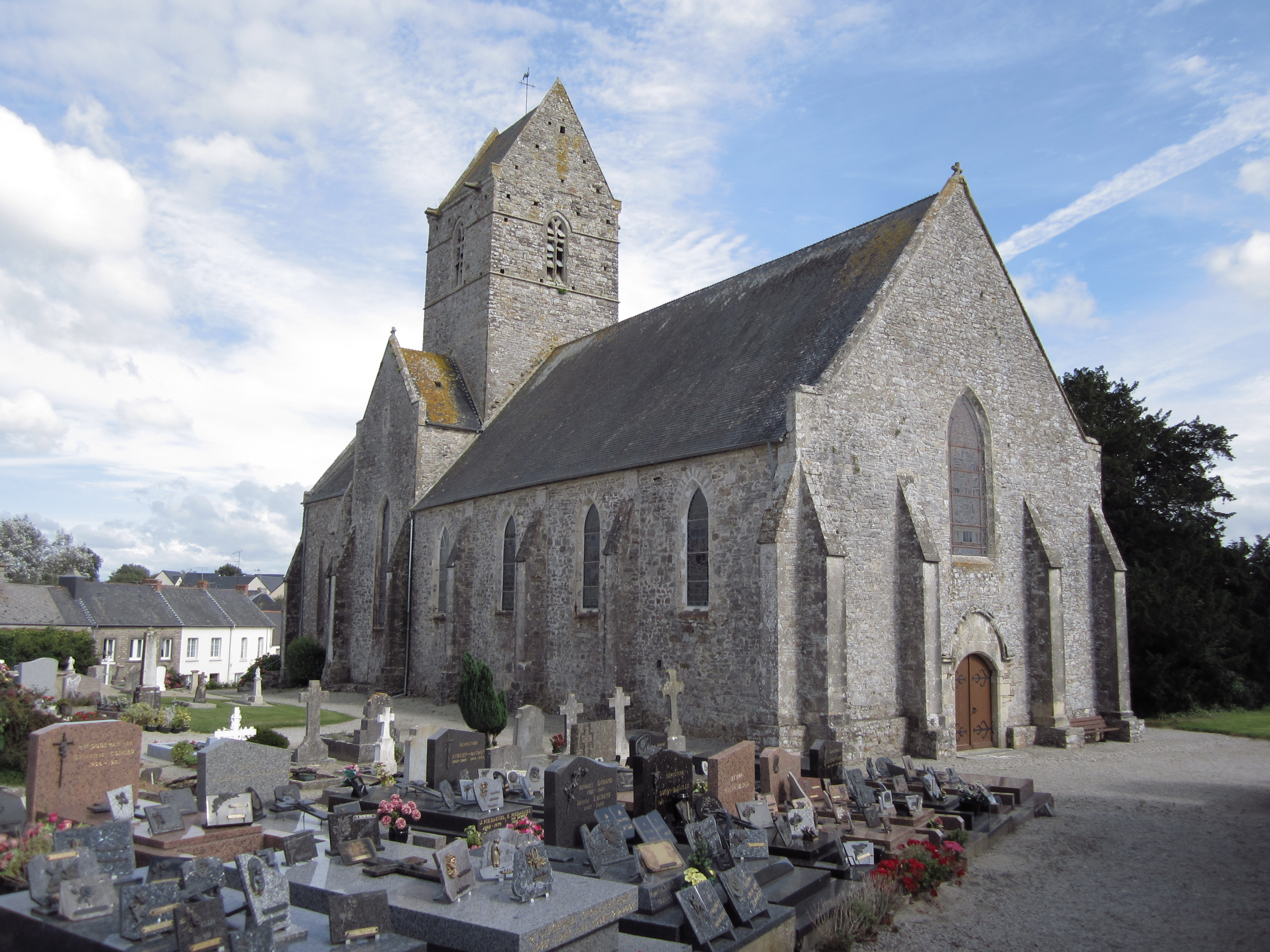
- The church of Saint-Florent
- Location of Besneville
- Location within France Location within Normandy
- Coordinates: 49°22′07″N 1°37′34″W
- Country: France
- Region: Normandy
- Department: Manche
- Arrondissement: Cherbourg
- Canton: Bricquebec-en-Cotentin
- Intercommunality: CA Cotentin

Government
  - Mayor (2020–2026): Michel Lafosse
- Area^{1}: 18.27 km^{2} (7.05 sq mi)
- Highest elevation: 116 m (381 ft)
- Lowest elevation: 10 m (33 ft)
- Population (2023): 661
  - Density: 36.2/km^{2} (93.7/sq mi)
- Time zone: UTC+01:00 (CET)
  - Summer (DST): UTC+02:00 (CEST)
- INSEE/Postal code: 50049 /50390
- ^{1} French Land Register data, which excludes lakes, ponds, glaciers > 1 km^{2} (0.386 sq mi or 247 acres) and river estuaries.

Besneville (French pronunciation: [bɛnvil]) is a commune in the Manche department in the Normandy region in northwestern France.

== Population ==
Historical population
Year	Pop.	±% p.a.
1968	682	—
1975	580	−2.29%
1982	564	−0.40%
1990	536	−0.63%
1999	516	−0.42%
2007	655	+3.03%
2012	691	+1.08%
2017	665	−0.76%
2023	661	−0.10%
Source: INSEE

== See also ==
- Communes of the Manche department
