= Neuville-en-Beaumont =

- Commune
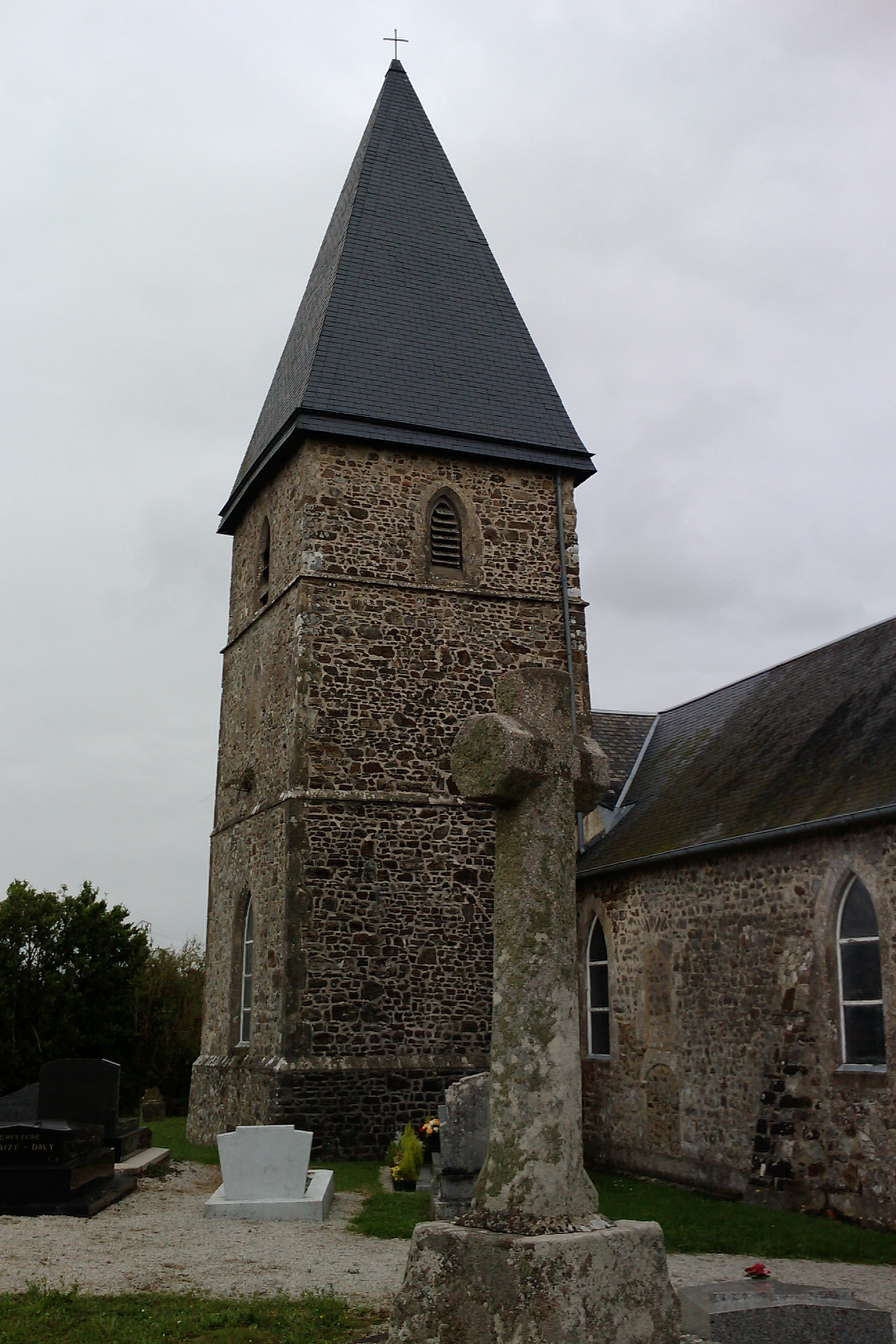
- The church in Neuville-en-Beaumont
- Location of Neuville-en-Beaumont
- Location within France Location within Normandy
- Coordinates: 49°20′55″N 1°35′54″W
- Country: France
- Region: Normandy
- Department: Manche
- Arrondissement: Cherbourg
- Canton: Bricquebec-en-Cotentin
- Intercommunality: CA Cotentin

Government
  - Mayor (2020–2026): Marie-Hélène Falaize
- Area^{1}: 1.69 km^{2} (0.65 sq mi)
- Elevation: 13 m (43 ft)
- Highest elevation: 41 m (135 ft)
- Lowest elevation: 7 m (23 ft)
- Population (2023): 27
  - Density: 16/km^{2} (41/sq mi)
- Time zone: UTC+01:00 (CET)
  - Summer (DST): UTC+02:00 (CEST)
- INSEE/Postal code: 50374 /50250
- ^{1} French Land Register data, which excludes lakes, ponds, glaciers > 1 km^{2} (0.386 sq mi or 247 acres) and river estuaries.

Neuville-en-Beaumont (French pronunciation: [nøvil ɑ̃ bomɔ̃]) is a commune in the Manche department in Normandy in north-western France.

== See also ==
- Communes of the Manche department
