= Hautteville-Bocage =

- Commune
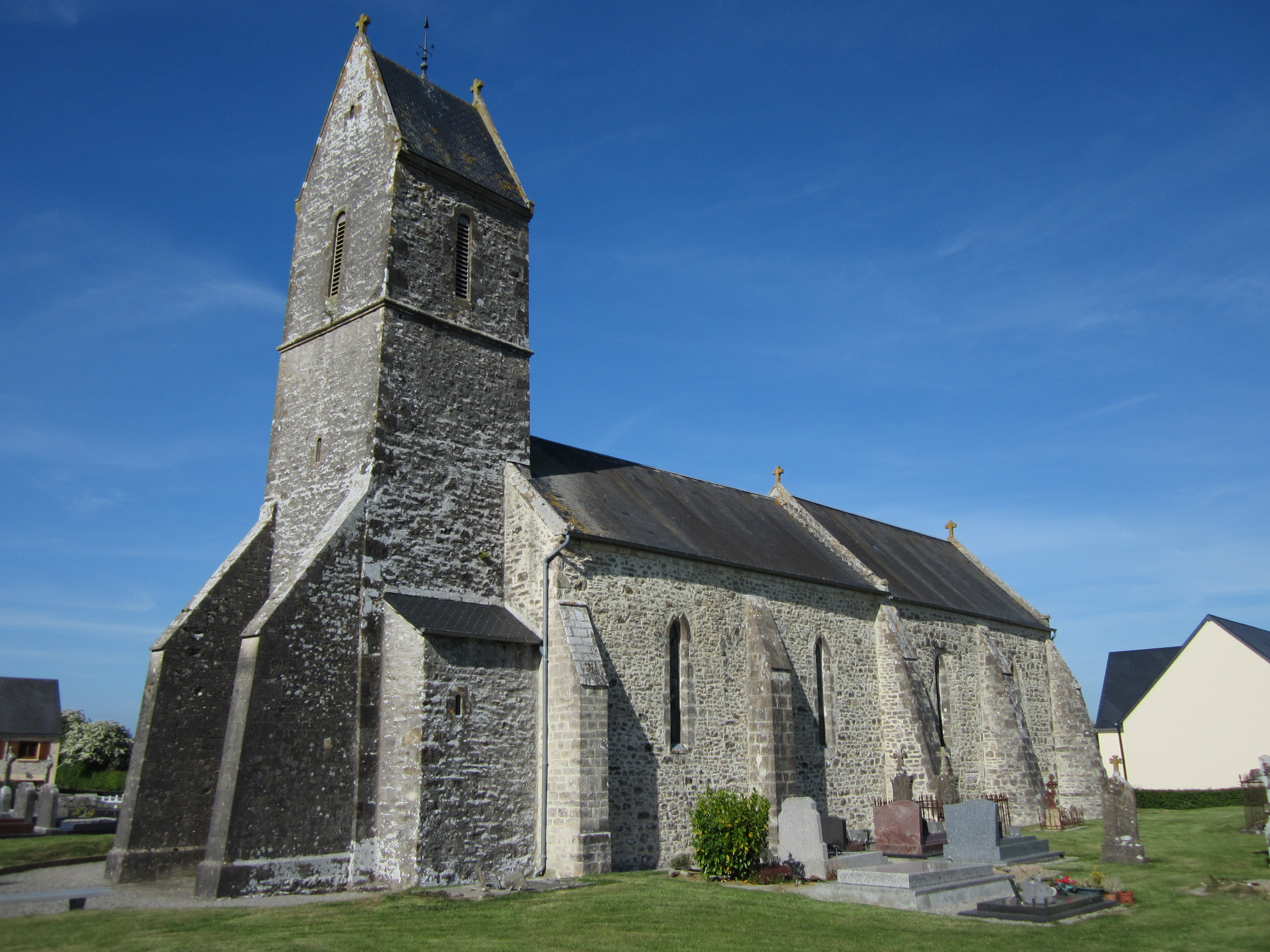
- The church of Notre-Dame
- Location of Hautteville-Bocage
- Location within France Location within Normandy
- Coordinates: 49°25′34″N 1°27′46″W
- Country: France
- Region: Normandy
- Department: Manche
- Arrondissement: Cherbourg
- Canton: Bricquebec-en-Cotentin
- Intercommunality: CA Cotentin

Government
  - Mayor (2020–2026): Henri Mignot
- Area^{1}: 4.22 km^{2} (1.63 sq mi)
- Elevation: 30 m (98 ft)
- Highest elevation: 39 m (128 ft)
- Lowest elevation: 10 m (33 ft)
- Population (2023): 152
  - Density: 36.0/km^{2} (93.3/sq mi)
- Time zone: UTC+01:00 (CET)
  - Summer (DST): UTC+02:00 (CEST)
- INSEE/Postal code: 50233 /50390
- ^{1} French Land Register data, which excludes lakes, ponds, glaciers > 1 km^{2} (0.386 sq mi or 247 acres) and river estuaries.

Hautteville-Bocage (French pronunciation: [otvil bɔkaʒ]) is a commune in the Manche department in north-western France.

== See also ==
- Communes of the Manche department
