= Golleville =

- Commune
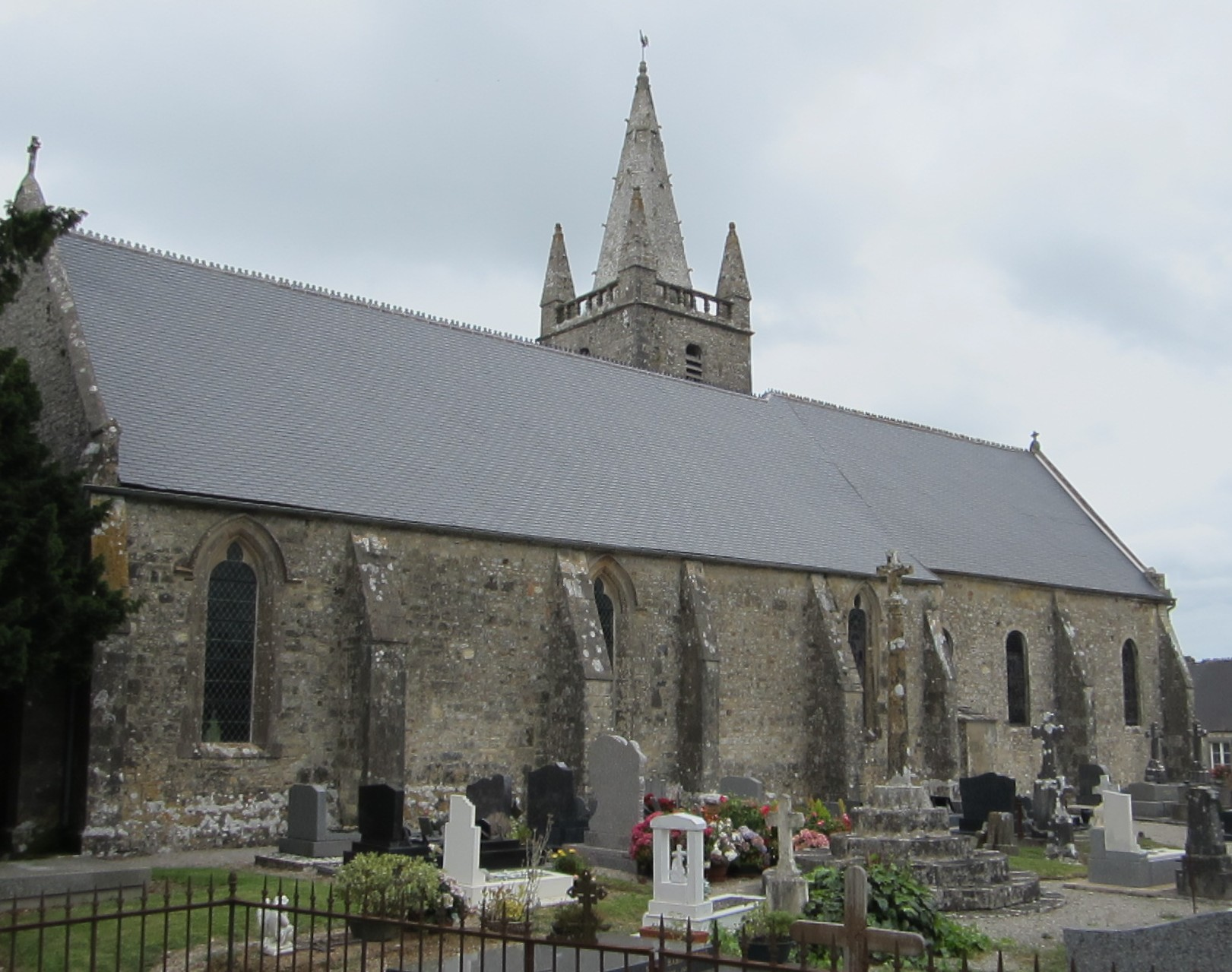
- The church of Saint-Martin
- Location of Golleville
- Location within France Location within Normandy
- Coordinates: 49°26′14″N 1°30′53″W
- Country: France
- Region: Normandy
- Department: Manche
- Arrondissement: Cherbourg
- Canton: Bricquebec-en-Cotentin
- Intercommunality: CA Cotentin

Government
  - Mayor (2020–2026): Hubert Langlois
- Area^{1}: 6.46 km^{2} (2.49 sq mi)
- Elevation: 32 m (105 ft)
- Highest elevation: 45 m (148 ft)
- Lowest elevation: 6 m (20 ft)
- Population (2023): 163
  - Density: 25.2/km^{2} (65.4/sq mi)
- Time zone: UTC+01:00 (CET)
  - Summer (DST): UTC+02:00 (CEST)
- INSEE/Postal code: 50207 /50390
- ^{1} French Land Register data, which excludes lakes, ponds, glaciers > 1 km^{2} (0.386 sq mi or 247 acres) and river estuaries.

Golleville (French pronunciation: [ɡɔlvil]) is a commune in the Manche department in north-western France.

== See also ==
- Communes of the Manche department
