= L'Oraille =

Coordinates: 49°29′11″N 1°33′54″E

L'Oraille (French pronunciation: [lɔʁaj]) is a hamlet in the Manche département of northern France.

It is part of the commune of L'Étang-Bertrand.

== See also ==
- Communes of the Manche department
