= Colomby =

- Commune
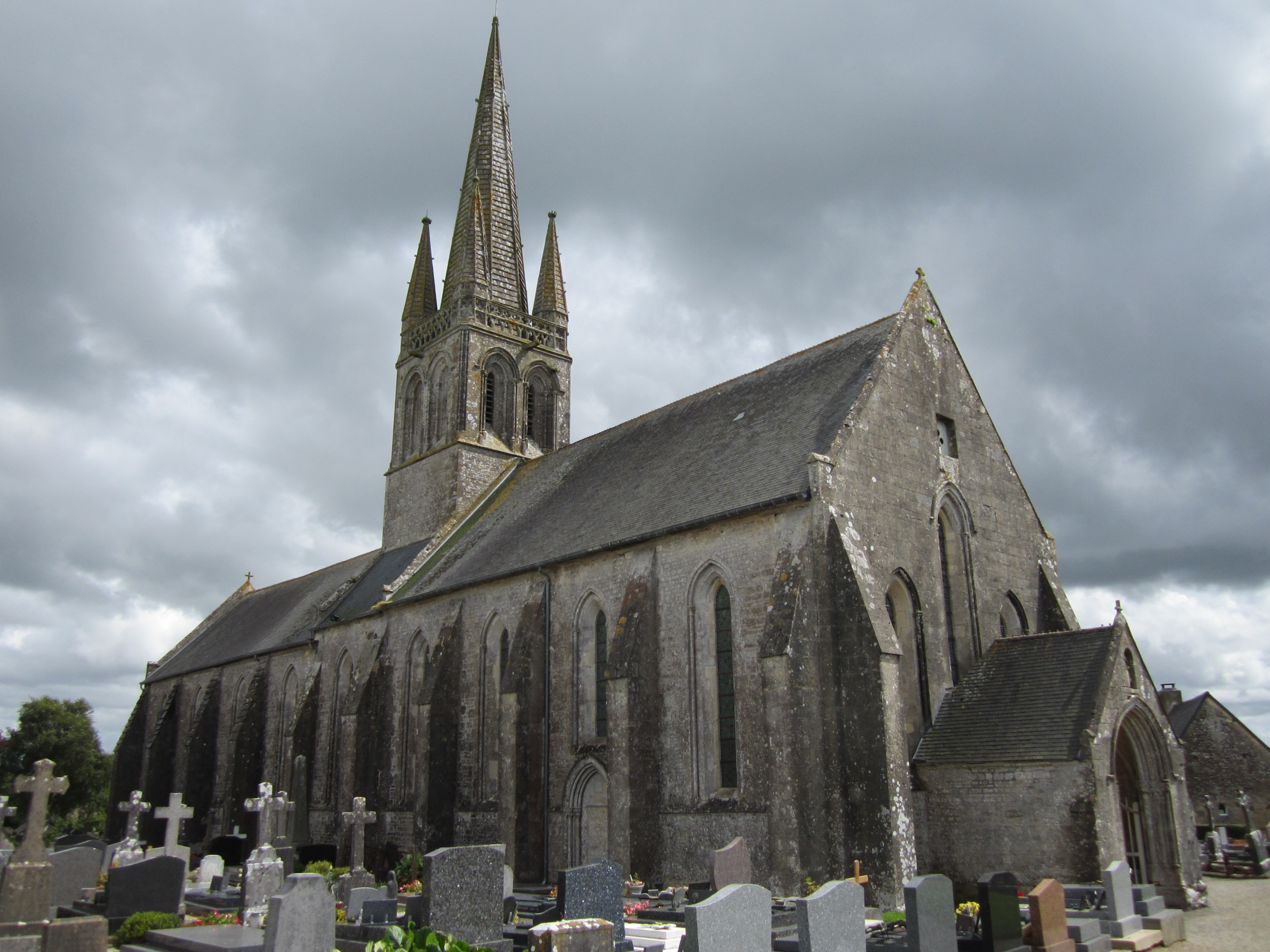
- The church of Saint-Georges

- Coat of arms
- Location of Colomby
- Location within France Location within Normandy
- Coordinates: 49°27′25″N 1°29′31″W
- Country: France
- Region: Normandy
- Department: Manche
- Arrondissement: Cherbourg
- Canton: Bricquebec-en-Cotentin
- Intercommunality: CA Cotentin

Government
  - Mayor (2020–2026): Robert Lebreton
- Area^{1}: 11.16 km^{2} (4.31 sq mi)
- Elevation: 24 m (79 ft)
- Highest elevation: 44 m (144 ft)
- Lowest elevation: 7 m (23 ft)
- Population (2023): 569
  - Density: 51.0/km^{2} (132/sq mi)
- Time zone: UTC+01:00 (CET)
  - Summer (DST): UTC+02:00 (CEST)
- INSEE/Postal code: 50138 /50700
- ^{1} French Land Register data, which excludes lakes, ponds, glaciers > 1 km^{2} (0.386 sq mi or 247 acres) and river estuaries.

Colomby (French pronunciation: [kɔlɔ̃bi]) is a commune in the Manche department in Normandy in north-western France.

== See also ==
- Communes of the Manche department
