= Sainte-Colombe, Manche =

Sainte-Colombe
- Commune
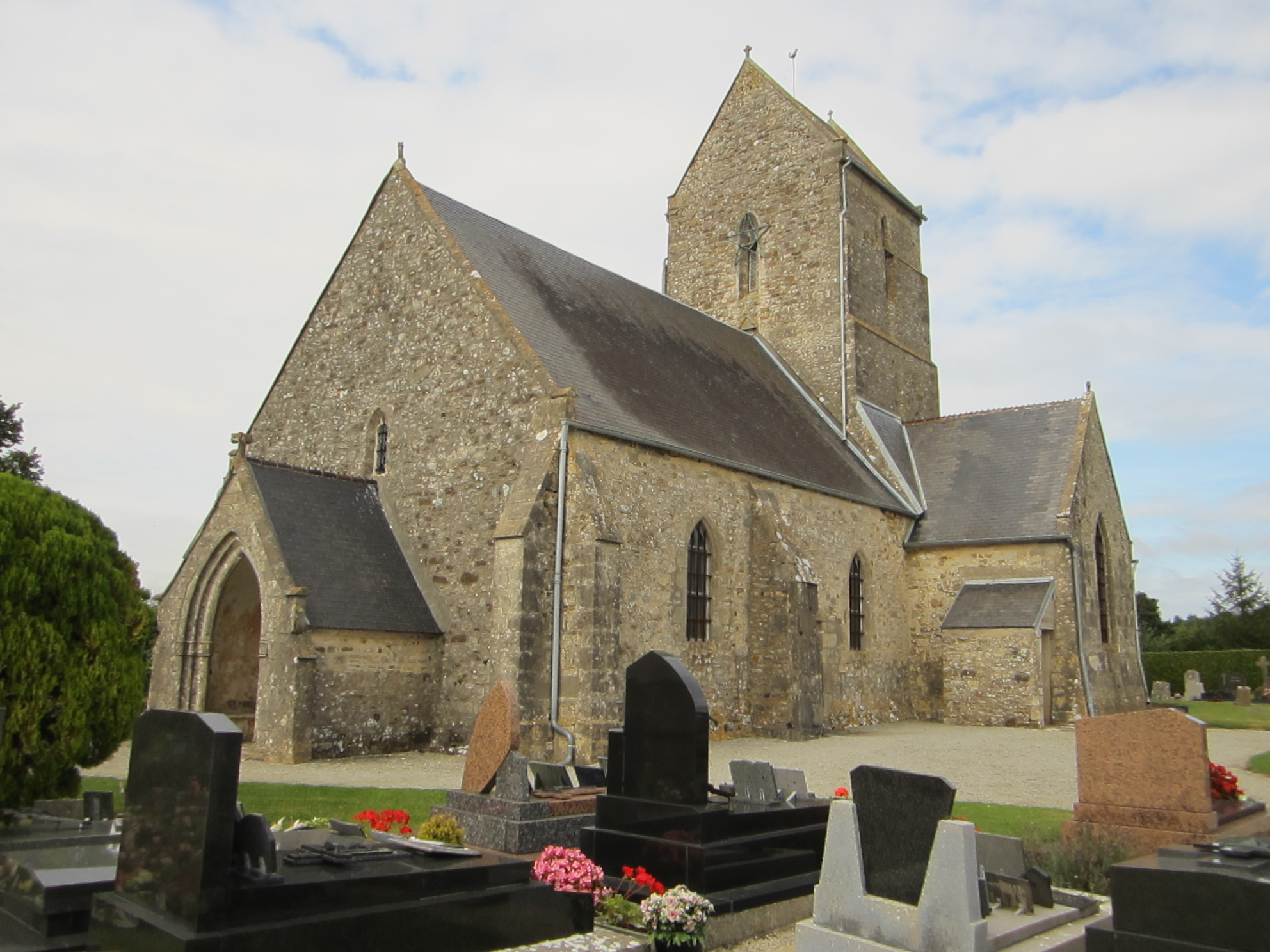
- The church of Sainte-Colombe
- Location of Sainte-Colombe
- Location within France Location within Normandy
- Coordinates: 49°25′21″N 1°31′16″W
- Country: France
- Region: Normandy
- Department: Manche
- Arrondissement: Cherbourg
- Canton: Bricquebec-en-Cotentin
- Intercommunality: CA Cotentin

Government
  - Mayor (2020–2026): Francis Crespin
- Area^{1}: 4.99 km^{2} (1.93 sq mi)
- Elevation: 30 m (98 ft)
- Population (2023): 181
  - Density: 36.3/km^{2} (93.9/sq mi)
- Time zone: UTC+01:00 (CET)
  - Summer (DST): UTC+02:00 (CEST)
- INSEE/Postal code: 50457 /50390
- ^{1} French Land Register data, which excludes lakes, ponds, glaciers > 1 km^{2} (0.386 sq mi or 247 acres) and river estuaries.

Sainte-Colombe (French pronunciation: [sɛ̃t kɔlɔ̃b]) is a commune in the Manche department in Normandy in north-western France.

== See also ==
- Communes of the Manche department
