= Bricquebec-en-Cotentin =

- Commune
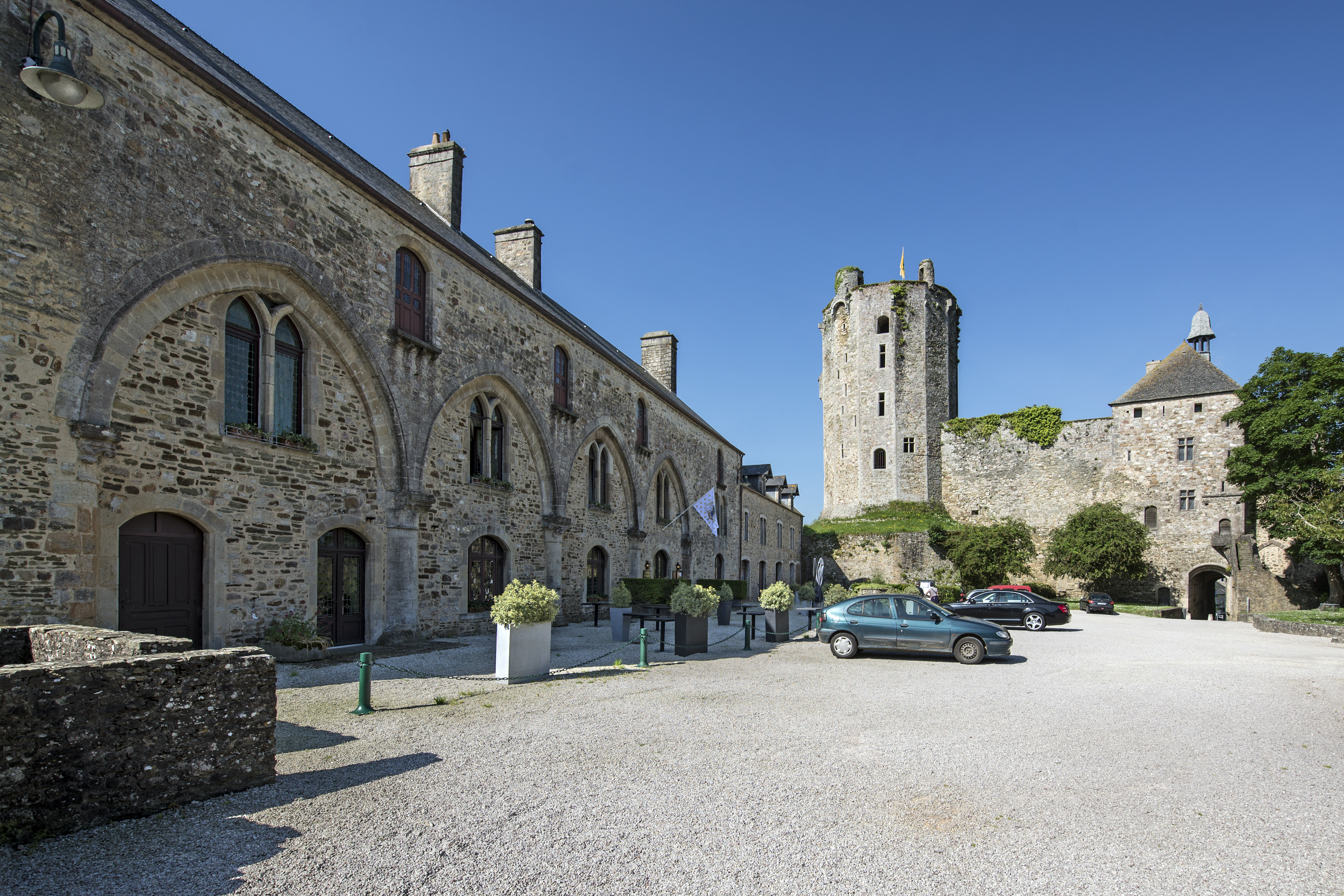
- The chateau in Bricquebec
- Location of Bricquebec-en-Cotentin
- Location within France Location within Normandy
- Coordinates: 49°28′12″N 1°38′02″W
- Country: France
- Region: Normandy
- Department: Manche
- Arrondissement: Cherbourg
- Canton: Bricquebec-en-Cotentin
- Intercommunality: CA Cotentin

Government
  - Mayor (2020–2026): Denis Lefer
- Area^{1}: 76.63 km^{2} (29.59 sq mi)
- Population (2023): 5,893
  - Density: 76.90/km^{2} (199.2/sq mi)
- Time zone: UTC+01:00 (CET)
  - Summer (DST): UTC+02:00 (CEST)
- INSEE/Postal code: 50082 /50260
- ^{1} French Land Register data, which excludes lakes, ponds, glaciers > 1 km^{2} (0.386 sq mi or 247 acres) and river estuaries.

Bricquebec-en-Cotentin (French pronunciation: [bʁikbɛk ɑ̃ kɔtɑ̃tɛ̃], literally Bricquebec in Cotentin) is a commune in the department of Manche, northwestern France. The municipality was established on 1 January 2016 by merger of the former communes of Bricquebec (the seat), Les Perques, Quettetot, Saint-Martin-le-Hébert, Le Valdécie and Le Vrétot.

== Geography ==
=== Climate ===
Bricquebec-en-Cotentin has an oceanic climate (Köppen climate classification Cfb). The average annual temperature in Bricquebec-en-Cotentin is 11.0 °C (51.8 °F). The average annual rainfall is 1,207.9 mm (47.56 in) with December as the wettest month. The temperatures are highest on average in August, at around 17.2 °C (63.0 °F), and lowest in February, at around 5.6 °C (42.1 °F). The highest temperature ever recorded in Bricquebec-en-Cotentin was 35.0 °C (95.0 °F) on 2 August 1990; the coldest temperature ever recorded was −13.5 °C (7.7 °F) on 17 January 1985.

Climate data for Bricquebec-en-Cotentin (1981–2010 averages, extremes 1969−present)
Month	Jan	Feb	Mar	Apr	May	Jun	Jul	Aug	Sep	Oct	Nov	Dec	Year
Record high °C (°F)	15.5 (59.9)	20.5 (68.9)	24.2 (75.6)	25.5 (77.9)	29.0 (84.2)	33.6 (92.5)	33.7 (92.7)	35.0 (95.0)	30.5 (86.9)	25.0 (77.0)	19.5 (67.1)	15.2 (59.4)	35.0 (95.0)
Mean daily maximum °C (°F)	8.4 (47.1)	8.5 (47.3)	11.0 (51.8)	13.0 (55.4)	16.6 (61.9)	19.4 (66.9)	21.4 (70.5)	21.8 (71.2)	19.3 (66.7)	15.5 (59.9)	11.7 (53.1)	9.3 (48.7)	14.7 (58.5)
Daily mean °C (°F)	5.8 (42.4)	5.6 (42.1)	7.6 (45.7)	9.1 (48.4)	12.4 (54.3)	15.0 (59.0)	17.0 (62.6)	17.2 (63.0)	15.0 (59.0)	12.0 (53.6)	8.6 (47.5)	6.6 (43.9)	11.0 (51.8)
Mean daily minimum °C (°F)	3.2 (37.8)	2.7 (36.9)	4.3 (39.7)	5.2 (41.4)	8.2 (46.8)	10.7 (51.3)	12.7 (54.9)	12.6 (54.7)	10.7 (51.3)	8.4 (47.1)	5.5 (41.9)	3.9 (39.0)	7.4 (45.3)
Record low °C (°F)	−13.5 (7.7)	−12.5 (9.5)	−4.2 (24.4)	−3.4 (25.9)	−1.9 (28.6)	3.0 (37.4)	5.7 (42.3)	5.0 (41.0)	2.2 (36.0)	−2.5 (27.5)	−6.0 (21.2)	−11.0 (12.2)	−13.5 (7.7)
Average precipitation mm (inches)	141.4 (5.57)	98.4 (3.87)	94.2 (3.71)	73.7 (2.90)	66.1 (2.60)	63.4 (2.50)	63.0 (2.48)	69.7 (2.74)	91.1 (3.59)	142.0 (5.59)	147.6 (5.81)	157.3 (6.19)	1,207.9 (47.56)
Average precipitation days (≥ 1.0 mm)	16.4	12.7	12.6	10.8	9.5	8.1	8.9	8.9	10.7	14.9	16.6	16.2	146.2
Source: Meteociel

== Population ==
The population data given in the table below refer to the commune in its geography as of January 2025.

Historical population
Year	Pop.	±% p.a.
1968	4,671	—
1975	4,602	−0.21%
1982	5,171	+1.68%
1990	5,874	+1.61%
1999	5,908	+0.06%
2007	5,912	+0.01%
2012	6,011	+0.33%
2017	5,899	−0.38%
2023	5,893	−0.02%
Source: INSEE

== See also ==
- Communes of the Manche department
