= Négreville =

- Commune
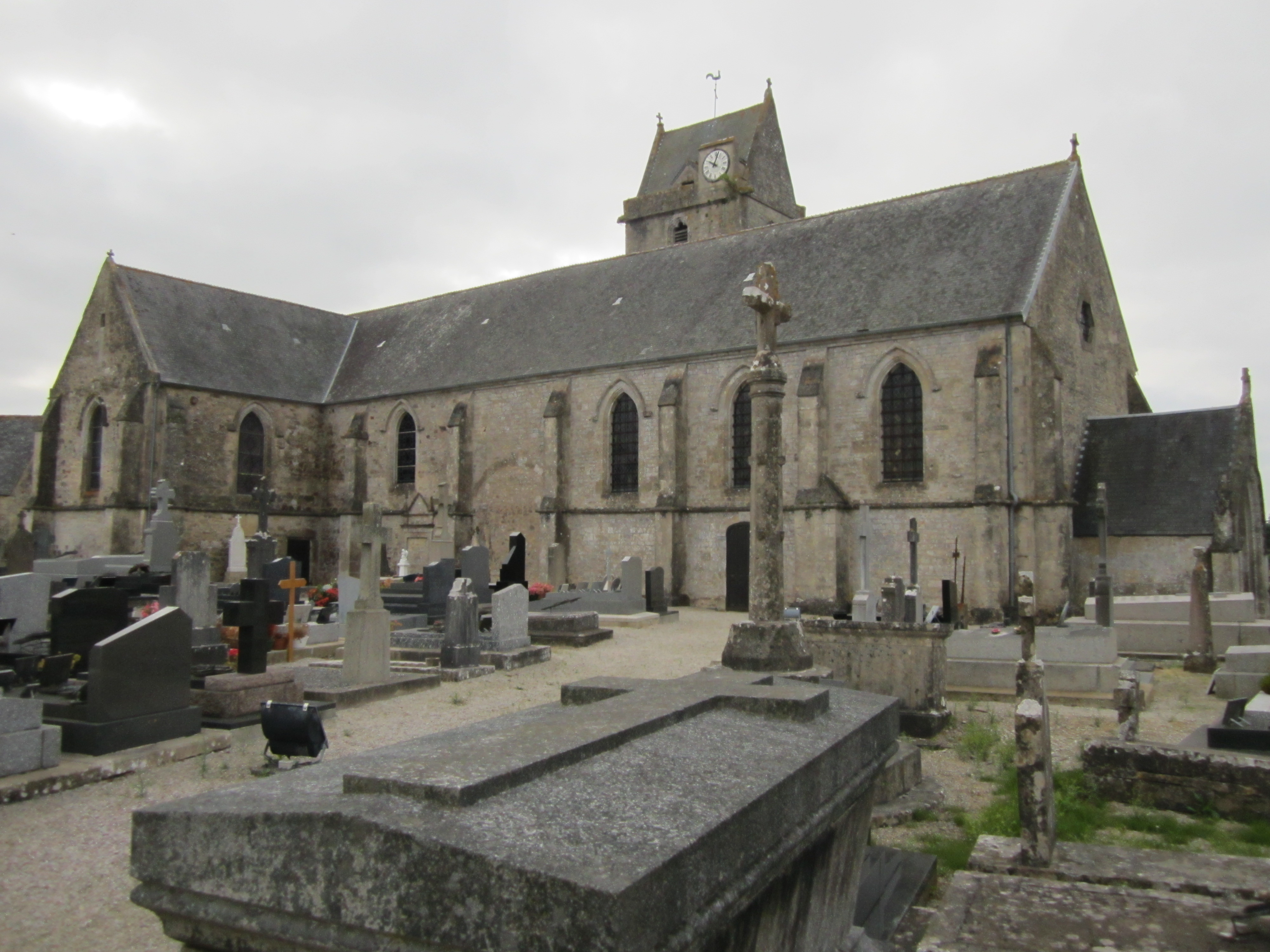
- The church of Saint-Pierre
- Location of Négreville
- Location within France Location within Normandy
- Coordinates: 49°31′02″N 1°33′23″W
- Country: France
- Region: Normandy
- Department: Manche
- Arrondissement: Cherbourg
- Canton: Bricquebec-en-Cotentin
- Intercommunality: CA Cotentin

Government
  - Mayor (2020–2026): Guy Lesénéchal
- Area^{1}: 11.48 km^{2} (4.43 sq mi)
- Elevation: 55 m (180 ft)
- Highest elevation: 79 m (259 ft)
- Lowest elevation: 14 m (46 ft)
- Population (2023): 845
  - Density: 73.6/km^{2} (191/sq mi)
- Time zone: UTC+01:00 (CET)
  - Summer (DST): UTC+02:00 (CEST)
- INSEE/Postal code: 50369 /50260
- ^{1} French Land Register data, which excludes lakes, ponds, glaciers > 1 km^{2} (0.386 sq mi or 247 acres) and river estuaries.

Négreville (French pronunciation: [neɡʁəvil]) is a commune in the department of Manche in the Normandy Region of north-western France.

== History ==
In 12th century, this place was owned by the family Wake (or Wac), one of the Norman families who lost definitely their properties after the conquest of Normandy by Philip II of France in 1204.

This area was close to the US landing beach Utah, one of the Normandy beaches where the allies invaded France on D-Day in June 1944. By the spring of the year, Négreville was occupied by the command post of the German Artillerie-Abteilung 456 (91 Infanterie-Division). On 6 June 1944 an American Douglas C-47 airplane was hit by German artillery above the commune, leading the 19 paratroopers to immediately jump, some 12 kilometers short of their planned target; several were injured or killed. On 19 June 1944, the American 313th Infantry Regiment (79th Infantry Division) reached Négreville on its way north.

In spring 2019, the mayors Normandy communes asked for U.S. participation in ceremonies during the 75th anniversary of the D-Day landings and subsequent liberation. Arrangements were still being made in late April 2019.

== See also ==
- Communes of the Manche department
