= Crosville-sur-Douve =

- Commune
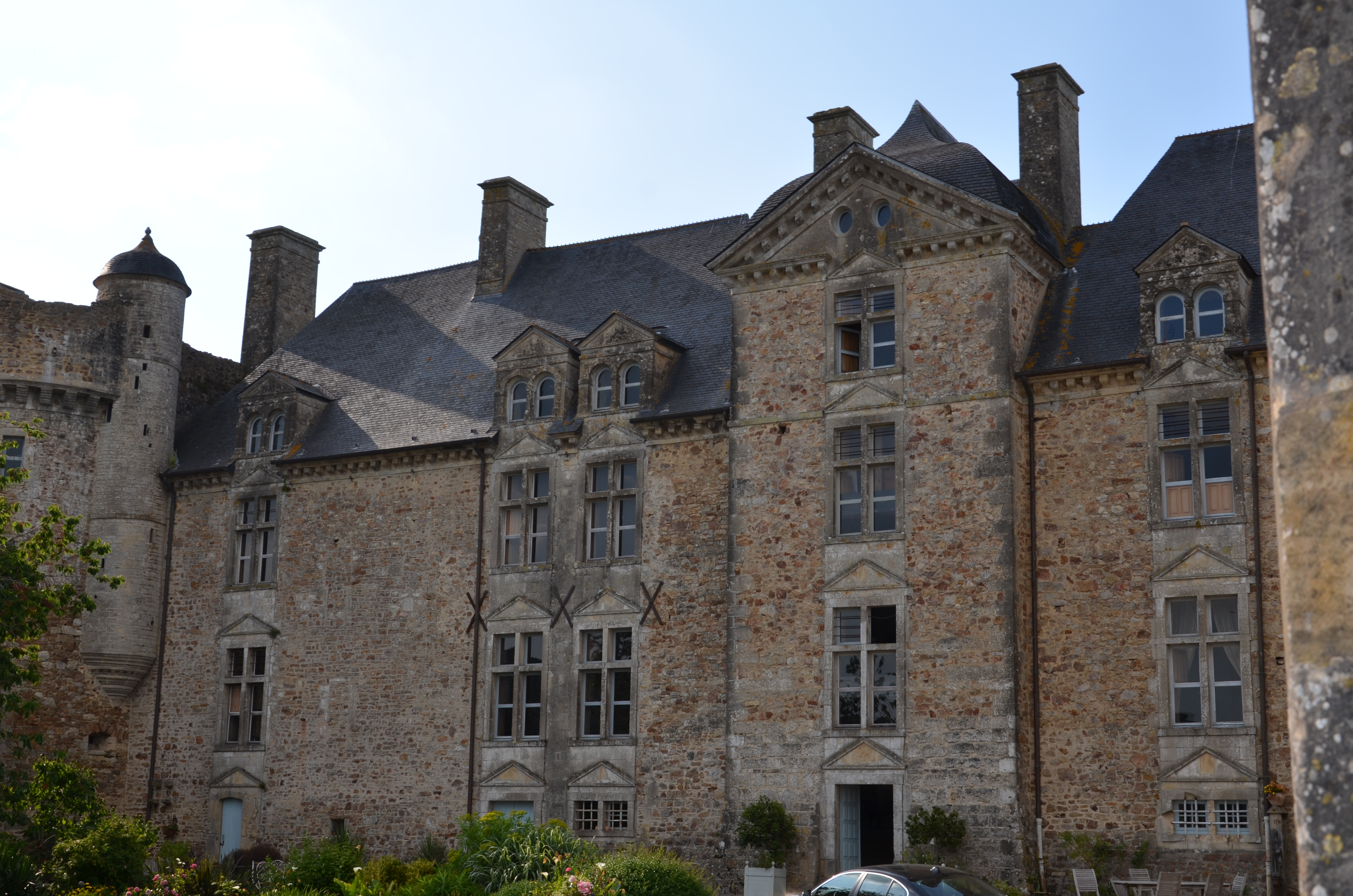
- Crosville castle

- Coat of arms
- Location of Crosville-sur-Douve
- Location within France Location within Normandy
- Coordinates: 49°23′23″N 1°28′59″W
- Country: France
- Region: Normandy
- Department: Manche
- Arrondissement: Cherbourg
- Canton: Bricquebec-en-Cotentin
- Intercommunality: CA Cotentin

Government
  - Mayor (2020–2026): Patrice Leroux
- Area^{1}: 4.06 km^{2} (1.57 sq mi)
- Elevation: 20 m (66 ft)
- Highest elevation: 33 m (108 ft)
- Lowest elevation: 3 m (9.8 ft)
- Population (2023): 62
  - Density: 15/km^{2} (40/sq mi)
- Time zone: UTC+01:00 (CET)
  - Summer (DST): UTC+02:00 (CEST)
- INSEE/Postal code: 50156 /50360
- ^{1} French Land Register data, which excludes lakes, ponds, glaciers > 1 km^{2} (0.386 sq mi or 247 acres) and river estuaries.

Crosville-sur-Douve (French pronunciation: [kʁovil syʁ duv], literally Crosville on Douve) is a commune in the Manche department in Normandy in north-western France.

== See also ==
- Communes of the Manche department
