= Taillepied =

- Commune
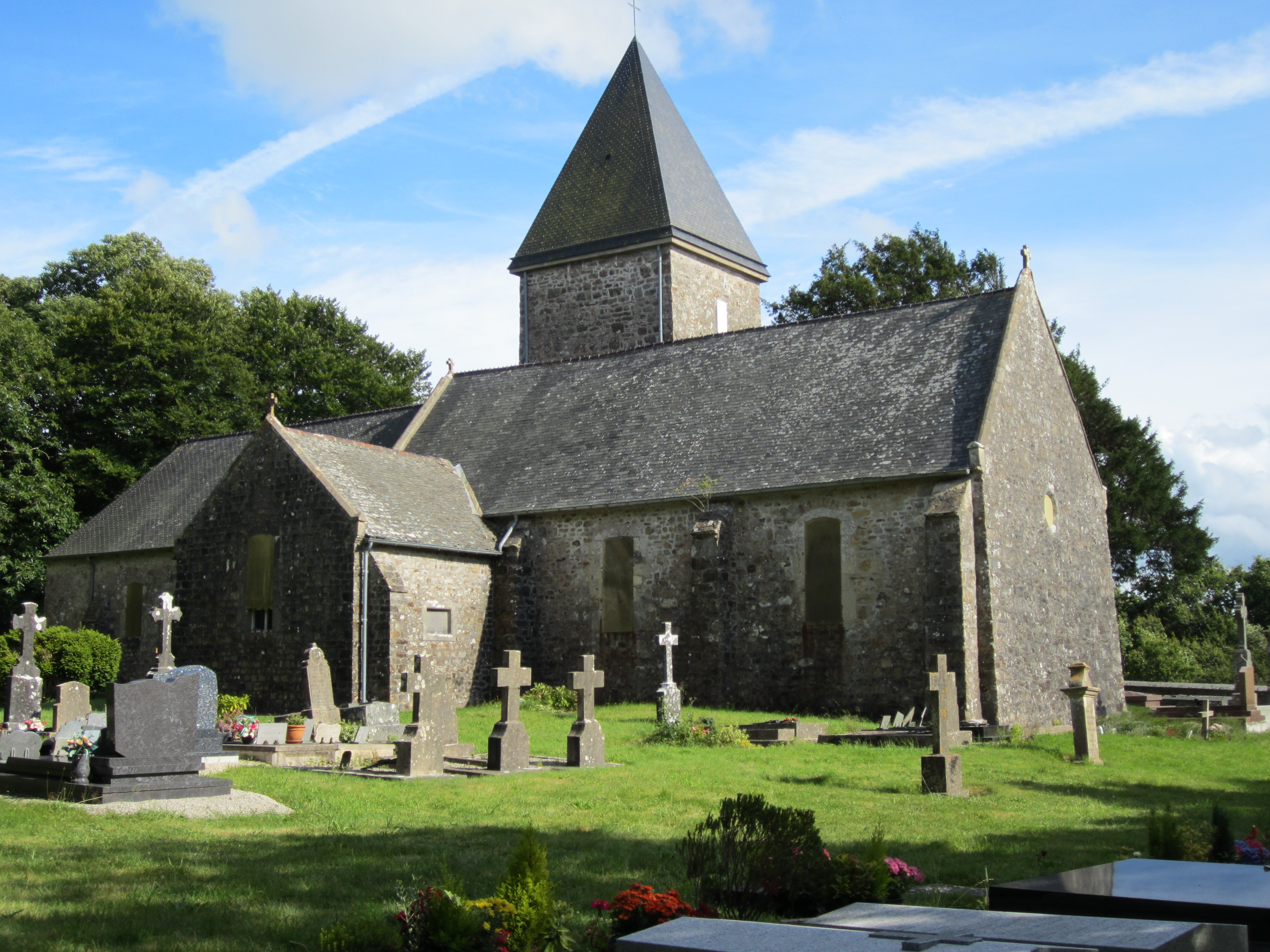
- The church of Saint-Jean-Baptiste
- Location of Taillepied
- Location within France Location within Normandy
- Coordinates: 49°22′24″N 1°34′51″W
- Country: France
- Region: Normandy
- Department: Manche
- Arrondissement: Cherbourg
- Canton: Bricquebec-en-Cotentin
- Intercommunality: CA Cotentin

Government
  - Mayor (2020–2026): Jean-Louis Piquot
- Area^{1}: 2.15 km^{2} (0.83 sq mi)
- Elevation: 16 m (52 ft)
- Highest elevation: 48 m (157 ft)
- Lowest elevation: 7 m (23 ft)
- Population (2023): 18
  - Density: 8.4/km^{2} (22/sq mi)
- Time zone: UTC+01:00 (CET)
  - Summer (DST): UTC+02:00 (CEST)
- INSEE/Postal code: 50587 /50390
- ^{1} French Land Register data, which excludes lakes, ponds, glaciers > 1 km^{2} (0.386 sq mi or 247 acres) and river estuaries.

Taillepied (French pronunciation: [tajpje]) is a commune in the Manche department in Normandy in north-western France.

== See also ==
- Communes of the Manche department
