= Morville, Manche =

Morville
- Commune
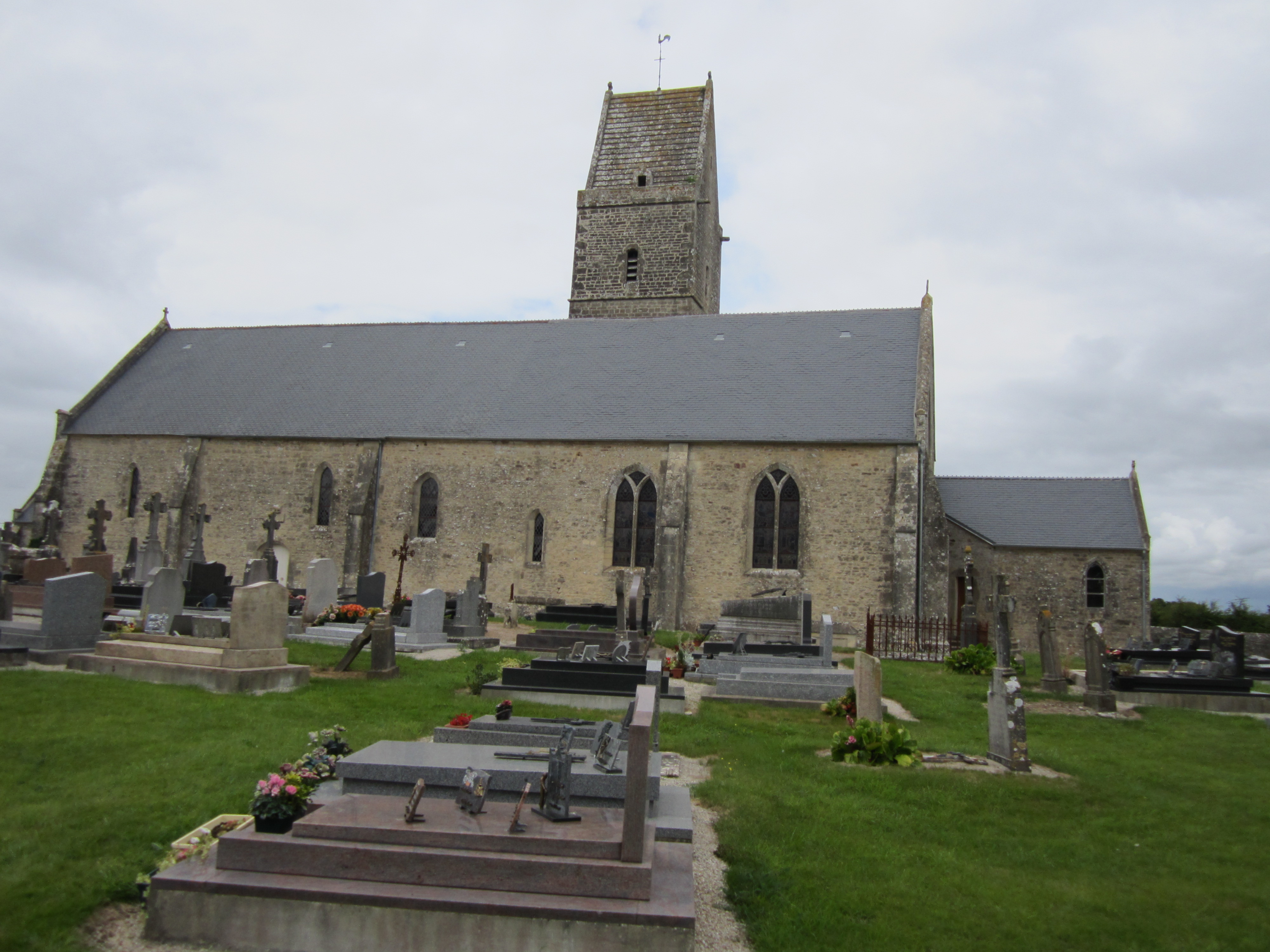
- The church of Saint-Pair
- Location of Morville
- Location within France Location within Normandy
- Coordinates: 49°28′28″N 1°30′40″W
- Country: France
- Region: Normandy
- Department: Manche
- Arrondissement: Cherbourg
- Canton: Bricquebec-en-Cotentin
- Intercommunality: CA Cotentin

Government
  - Mayor (2020–2026): Yves François
- Area^{1}: 7.08 km^{2} (2.73 sq mi)
- Elevation: 25 m (82 ft)
- Highest elevation: 47 m (154 ft)
- Lowest elevation: 12 m (39 ft)
- Population (2023): 277
  - Density: 39.1/km^{2} (101/sq mi)
- Time zone: UTC+01:00 (CET)
  - Summer (DST): UTC+02:00 (CEST)
- INSEE/Postal code: 50360 /50700
- ^{1} French Land Register data, which excludes lakes, ponds, glaciers > 1 km^{2} (0.386 sq mi or 247 acres) and river estuaries.

Morville (French pronunciation: [mɔʁvil]) is a commune in the Manche department in Normandy in north-western France.

== See also ==
- Communes of the Manche department
