= Rauville-la-Bigot =

- Commune
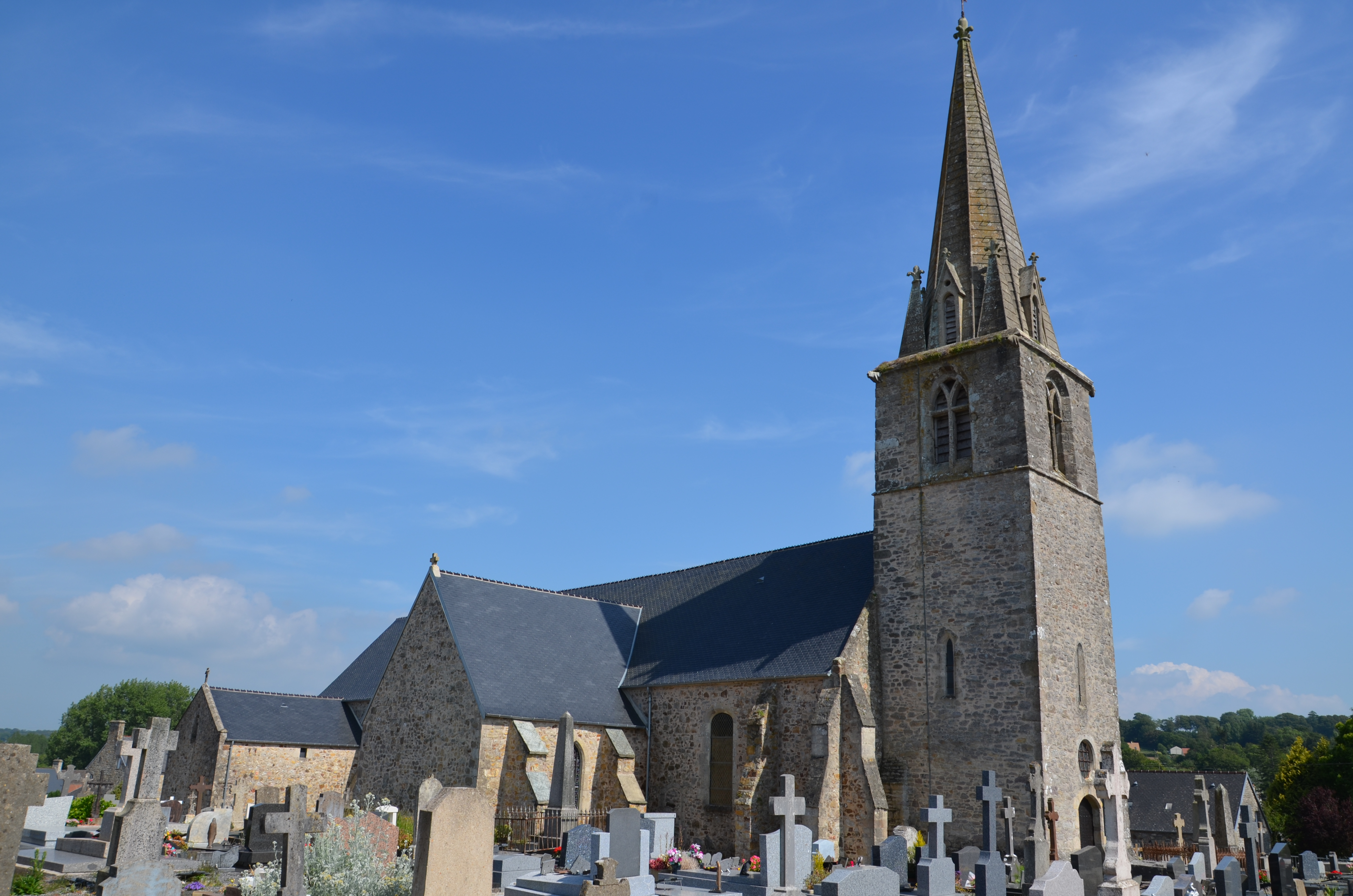
- The church of Notre-Dame
- Location of Rauville-la-Bigot
- Location within France Location within Normandy
- Coordinates: 49°31′10″N 1°40′56″W
- Country: France
- Region: Normandy
- Department: Manche
- Arrondissement: Cherbourg
- Canton: Bricquebec-en-Cotentin
- Intercommunality: CA Cotentin

Government
  - Mayor (2020–2026): Hubert Lefèvre
- Area^{1}: 17.16 km^{2} (6.63 sq mi)
- Elevation: 100 m (330 ft)
- Highest elevation: 151 m (495 ft)
- Lowest elevation: 52 m (171 ft)
- Population (2023): 1,082
  - Density: 63.05/km^{2} (163.3/sq mi)
- Time zone: UTC+01:00 (CET)
  - Summer (DST): UTC+02:00 (CEST)
- INSEE/Postal code: 50425 /50260
- ^{1} French Land Register data, which excludes lakes, ponds, glaciers > 1 km^{2} (0.386 sq mi or 247 acres) and river estuaries.

Rauville-la-Bigot (French pronunciation: [ʁovil la biɡo]) is a commune in the Manche department in north-western France.

== See also ==
- Communes of the Manche department
