= Aristide Frémine =

French writer (1837–1897)

- Born: 1837
- Died: 5 December 1897 (aged 59–60)
- Occupation: writer

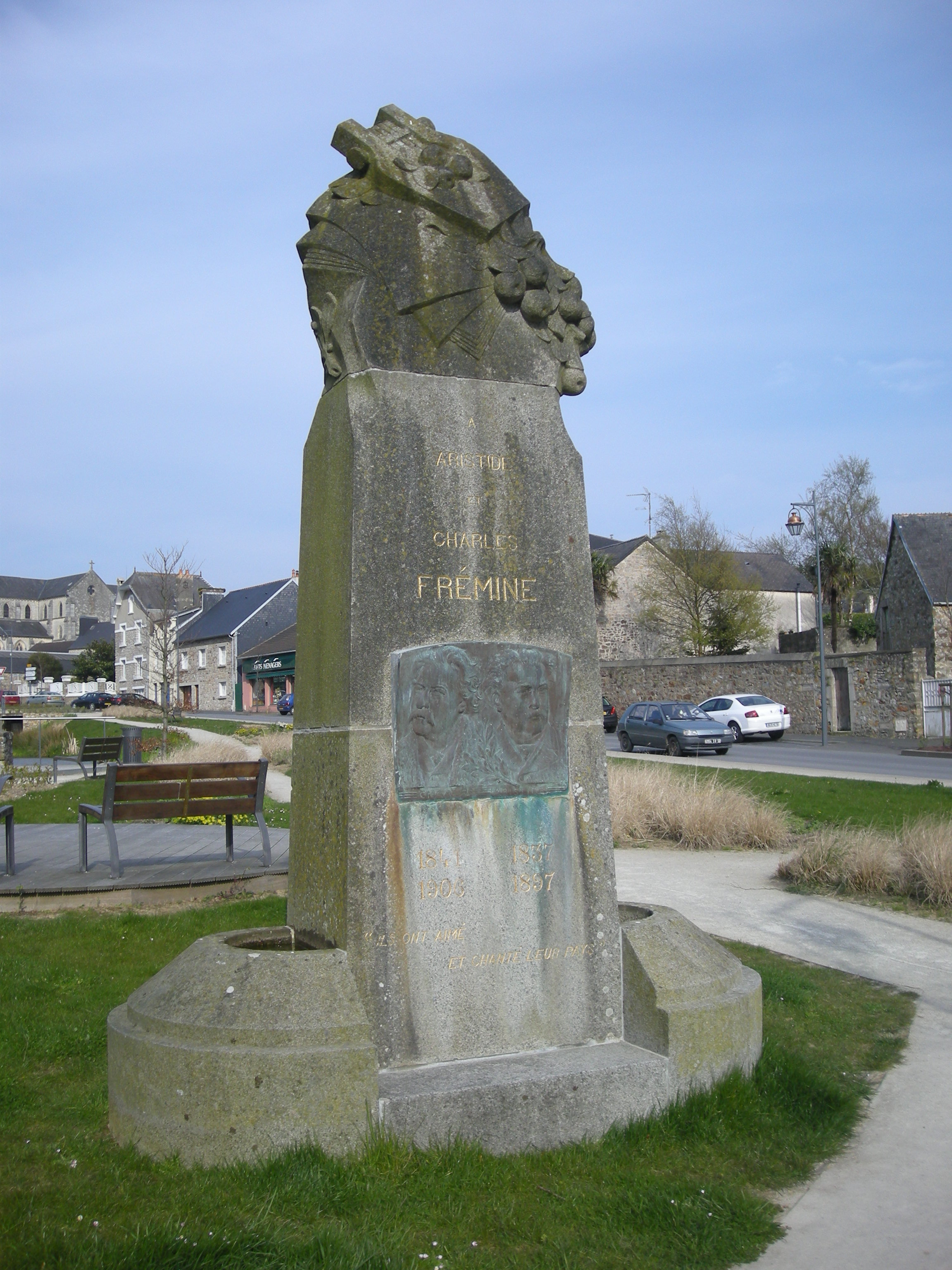
BricquebecFrémine

Aristide Frémine (1837 – 5 December 1897) was a French writer.

== Biography ==
A native of Bricquebec, in the département of Manche, Aristide Frémine is frequently associated with his brother, the writer Charles Frémine (born 1841). His literary output spans various genres, including the epic verse Legend of Normandy (Légende de Normandie) and the 1892 romance A Young Lady from the Countryside (Une Demoiselle de Campagne). In addition to his creative fiction, he authored the historical and regional study The French in the Channel Islands (Les Français dans les Îles de la Manche). Beyond his published volumes, Aristide Frémine maintained a significant presence in the Parisian press as a serial contributor to the daily newspaper Le Figaro between 1884 and 1888. He died in Issy-les-Moulineaux, within the department of Seine-Saint-Denis.

== Bibliography ==
- The French Wikipedia stub this article was translated from on January 26, 2006
