= La Bonneville =

- Commune
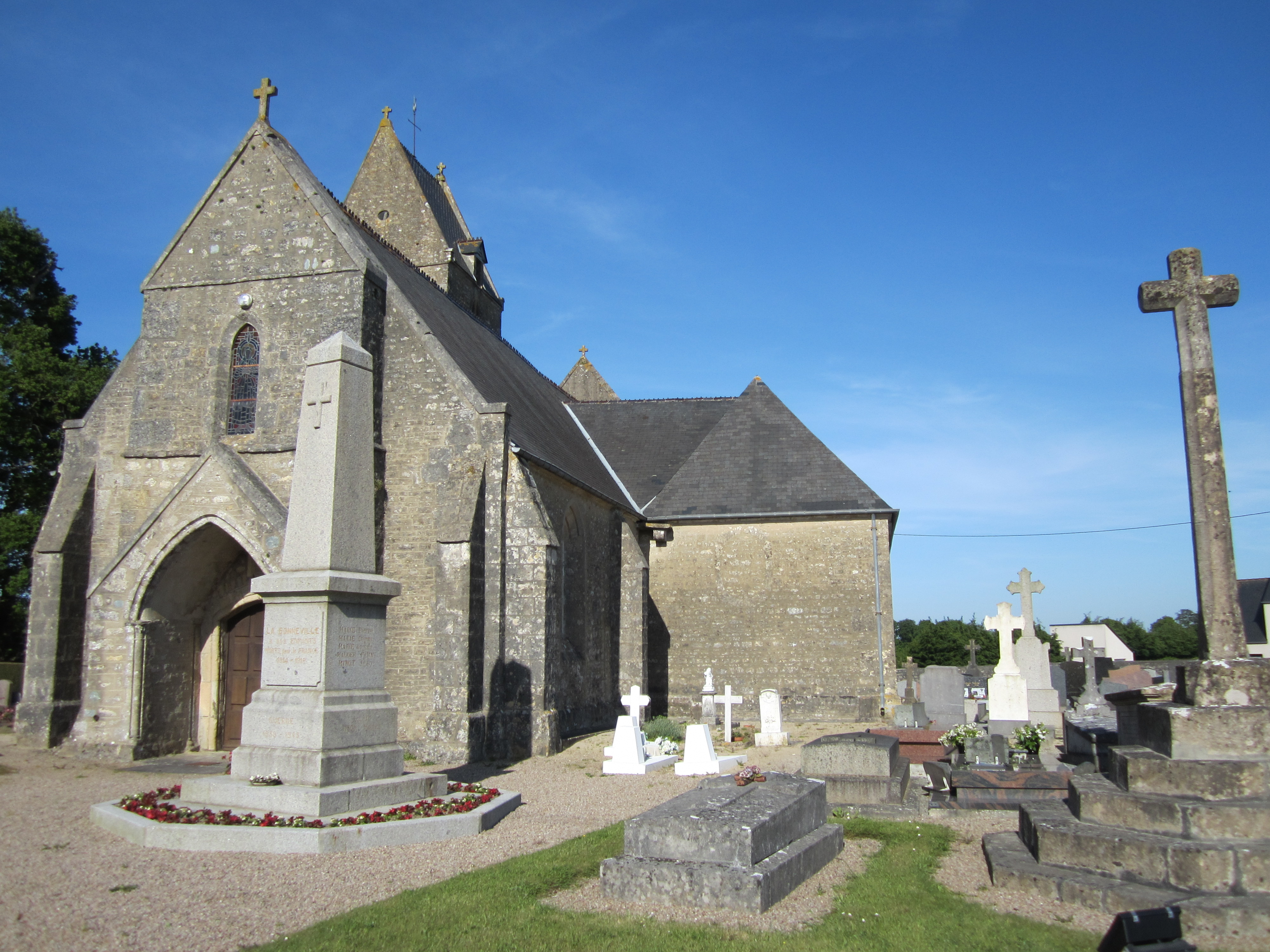
- The church of Saint-Sébastien
- Location of La Bonneville
- Location within France Location within Normandy
- Coordinates: 49°23′35″N 1°27′09″W
- Country: France
- Region: Normandy
- Department: Manche
- Arrondissement: Cherbourg
- Canton: Bricquebec-en-Cotentin
- Intercommunality: CA Cotentin

Government
  - Mayor (2020–2026): Étienne Asseline
- Area^{1}: 6.31 km^{2} (2.44 sq mi)
- Elevation: 24 m (79 ft)
- Highest elevation: 32 m (105 ft)
- Lowest elevation: 3 m (9.8 ft)
- Population (2023): 173
  - Density: 27.4/km^{2} (71.0/sq mi)
- Time zone: UTC+01:00 (CET)
  - Summer (DST): UTC+02:00 (CEST)
- INSEE/Postal code: 50064 /50360
- ^{1} French Land Register data, which excludes lakes, ponds, glaciers > 1 km^{2} (0.386 sq mi or 247 acres) and river estuaries.

La Bonneville (French pronunciation: [la bɔnvil]) is a commune in the Manche department in Normandy in northwestern France.

== Population ==
Historical population
Year	Pop.	±% p.a.
1968	205	—
1975	173	−2.40%
1982	154	−1.65%
1990	129	−2.19%
1999	143	+1.15%
2007	160	+1.41%
2012	188	+3.28%
2017	186	−0.21%
2023	173	−1.20%
Source: INSEE

== See also ==
- Communes of the Manche department
