= Reigneville-Bocage =

- Commune
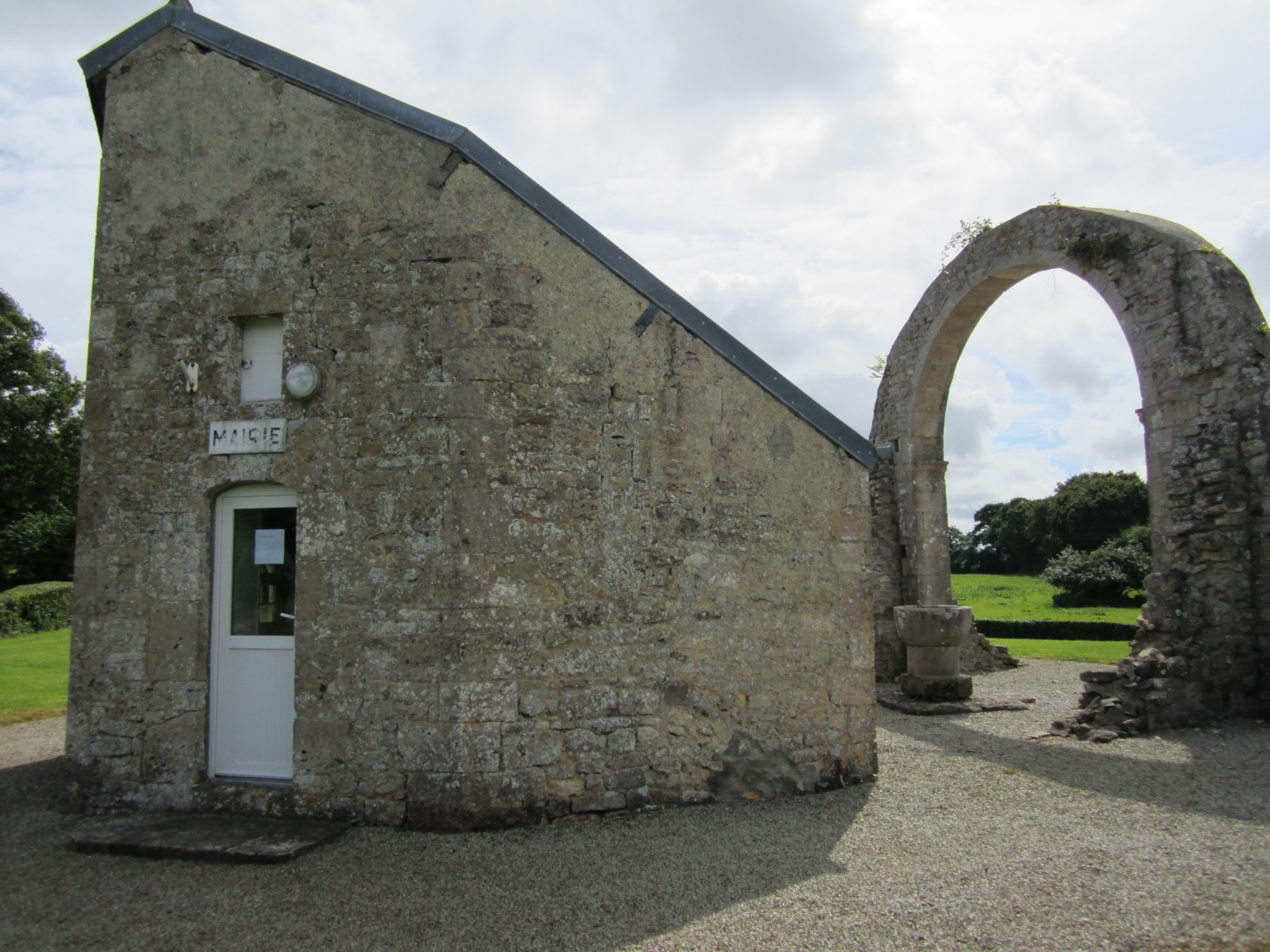
- The town hall
- Location of Reigneville-Bocage
- Location within France Location within Normandy
- Coordinates: 49°24′28″N 1°28′25″W
- Country: France
- Region: Normandy
- Department: Manche
- Arrondissement: Cherbourg
- Canton: Bricquebec-en-Cotentin
- Intercommunality: CA Cotentin

Government
  - Mayor (2020–2026): Dominique Lemenuel
- Area^{1}: 2.27 km^{2} (0.88 sq mi)
- Elevation: 20 m (66 ft)
- Highest elevation: 37 m (121 ft)
- Lowest elevation: 13 m (43 ft)
- Population (2023): 34
  - Density: 15/km^{2} (39/sq mi)
- Time zone: UTC+01:00 (CET)
  - Summer (DST): UTC+02:00 (CEST)
- INSEE/Postal code: 50430 /50390
- ^{1} French Land Register data, which excludes lakes, ponds, glaciers > 1 km^{2} (0.386 sq mi or 247 acres) and river estuaries.

Reigneville-Bocage (French pronunciation: [ʁɛɲvil bɔkaʒ]) is a commune in the Manche department in Normandy in north-western France.

== See also ==
- Communes of the Manche department
