= Néhou =

- Commune
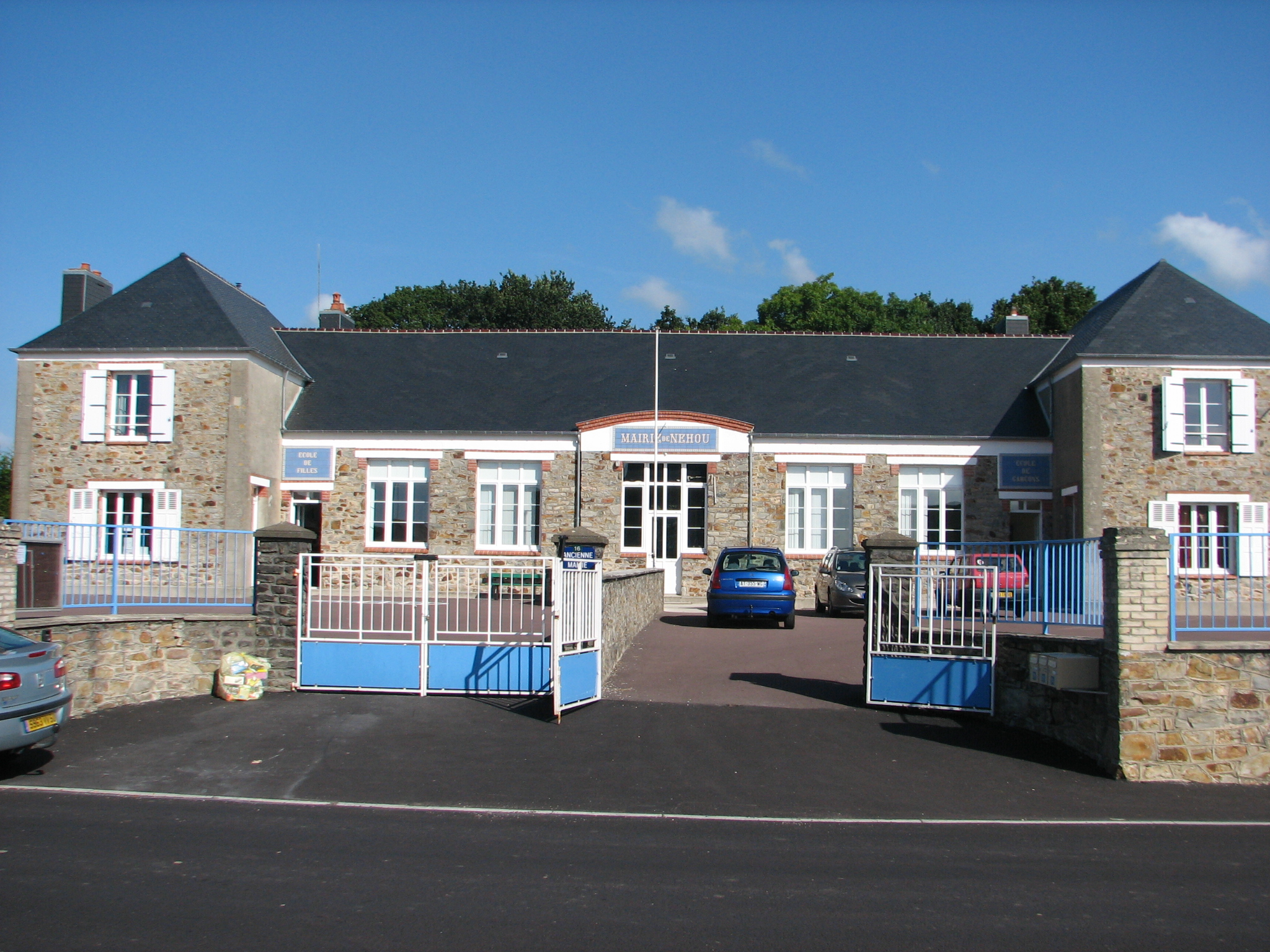
- Old Town Hall
- Location of Néhou
- Location within France Location within Normandy
- Coordinates: 49°25′15″N 1°32′27″W
- Country: France
- Region: Normandy
- Department: Manche
- Arrondissement: Cherbourg
- Canton: Bricquebec-en-Cotentin
- Intercommunality: CA Cotentin

Government
  - Mayor (2020–2026): Dominique Jeanne
- Area^{1}: 15.98 km^{2} (6.17 sq mi)
- Highest elevation: 74 m (243 ft)
- Lowest elevation: 3 m (9.8 ft)
- Population (2023): 609
  - Density: 38.1/km^{2} (98.7/sq mi)
- Time zone: UTC+01:00 (CET)
  - Summer (DST): UTC+02:00 (CEST)
- INSEE/Postal code: 50370 /50390
- ^{1} French Land Register data, which excludes lakes, ponds, glaciers > 1 km^{2} (0.386 sq mi or 247 acres) and river estuaries.

Néhou (French pronunciation: [ne.u]) is a commune in the Manche department in Normandy in north-western France.

== See also ==
- Communes of the Manche department
