= Jean de Launoy =

French historian

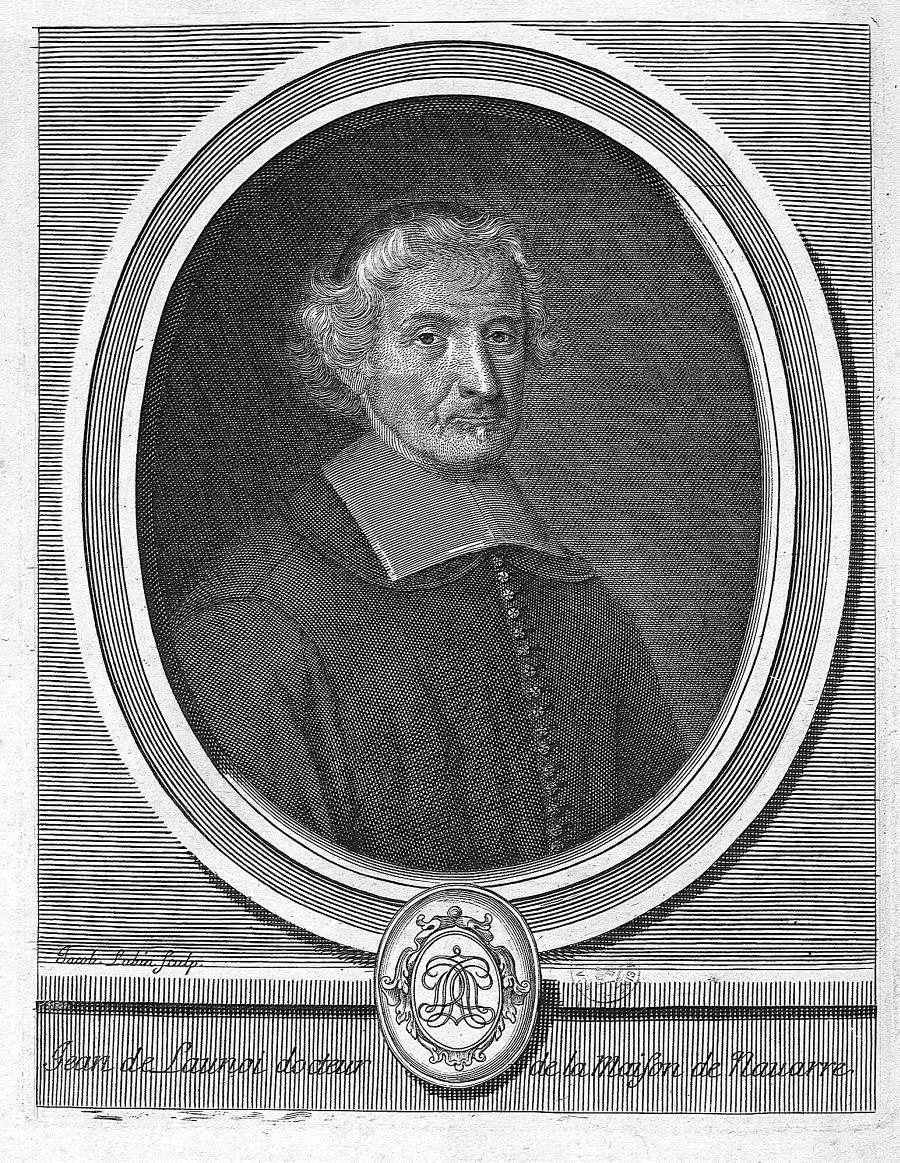
Jean de Launoy by Jacques Lubin

Jean de Launoy (Joannes Launoius) (21 December 1603 – 10 March 1678) was a French historian. Known as "le dénicheur des saints", he was a critical historiographer. He was on the sceptical side over the supposed papal bull Sacratissimo uti culmine (see Sabbatine Privilege). In papal politics he was a Gallican, in theology a Jansenist.

== Life ==
Jean de Launoy was born in Le Valdécie, France. He studied philosophy and theology at the College of Navarre in Paris, where he later became a teacher and a historian.

Receiving a licenciate and doctorate in 1634, he was ordained a priest in 1636. As an historian he developed an extreme form of criticism, pointing out the false attributions of works and the unchecked assertions of the martyrologium. His 1641 La commentitio Lazari et Maximini, Magdalenae et Marthae in Provinciam appulsu, described the Provençal legends of Mary Magdalen as pious nonsense. He considered the vita concerning Catherine of Alexandria a myth.

In his books and letters he developed a strong and coherent form of Gallicanism, rejecting the infallibility of the Roman pontiff and professing the superiority of the general council.

He died in Paris, on March 10, 1678.

== Works ==
- Dissertationes tres: Quarum una Gregorii Turonensis de septem episcoporum adventu in Galliam: Altera Sulpitii Severi de primis Galliae martyribus locus defenditur; et in utraque diversarum Galliae ecclesiarum origines tractantur: Tertia, quid de primi Cenomannorum antistitis epocha sentiendum (Paris, 1651)
- Explicata Ecclesie traditio circa canonem: Omnis utriusque (1672)
- Præscriptiones de Conceptu B. Mariæ Virginis (1677)
- Opera Omnia (Geneva, 1731)
