= Rocheville =

- Commune
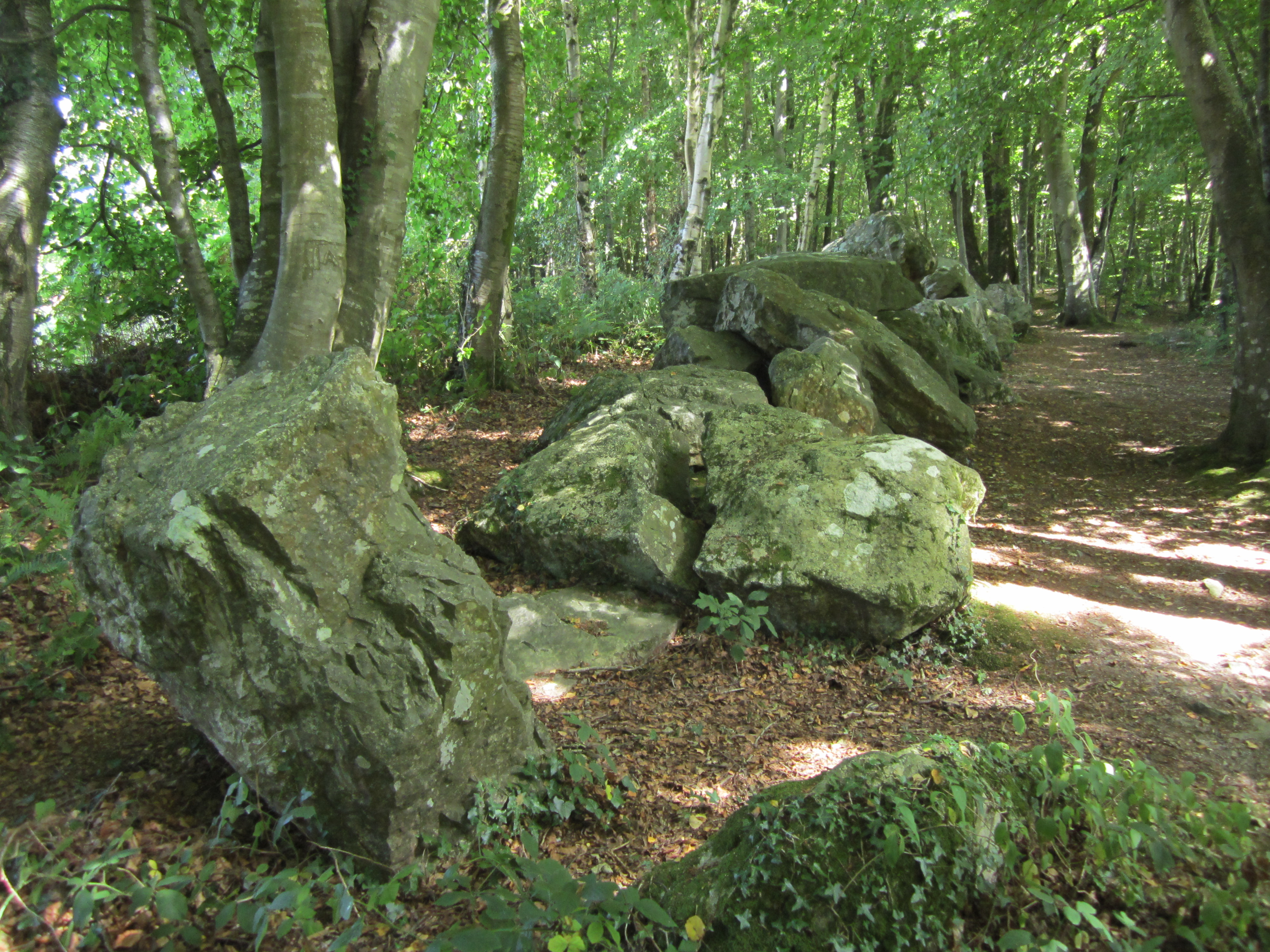
- The gallery grave
- Location of Rocheville
- Location within France Location within Normandy
- Coordinates: 49°30′13″N 1°35′41″W
- Country: France
- Region: Normandy
- Department: Manche
- Arrondissement: Cherbourg
- Canton: Bricquebec-en-Cotentin
- Intercommunality: CA Cotentin

Government
  - Mayor (2020–2026): Sonia Lepoittevin
- Area^{1}: 10.07 km^{2} (3.89 sq mi)
- Elevation: 55 m (180 ft)
- Highest elevation: 135 m (443 ft)
- Lowest elevation: 22 m (72 ft)
- Population (2023): 620
  - Density: 62/km^{2} (160/sq mi)
- Time zone: UTC+01:00 (CET)
  - Summer (DST): UTC+02:00 (CEST)
- INSEE/Postal code: 50435 /50260
- ^{1} French Land Register data, which excludes lakes, ponds, glaciers > 1 km^{2} (0.386 sq mi or 247 acres) and river estuaries.

Rocheville (French pronunciation: [ʁɔʃvil]) is a commune in the Manche department in Normandy in north-western France.

== See also ==
- Communes of the Manche department
