= L'Étang-Bertrand =

- Commune
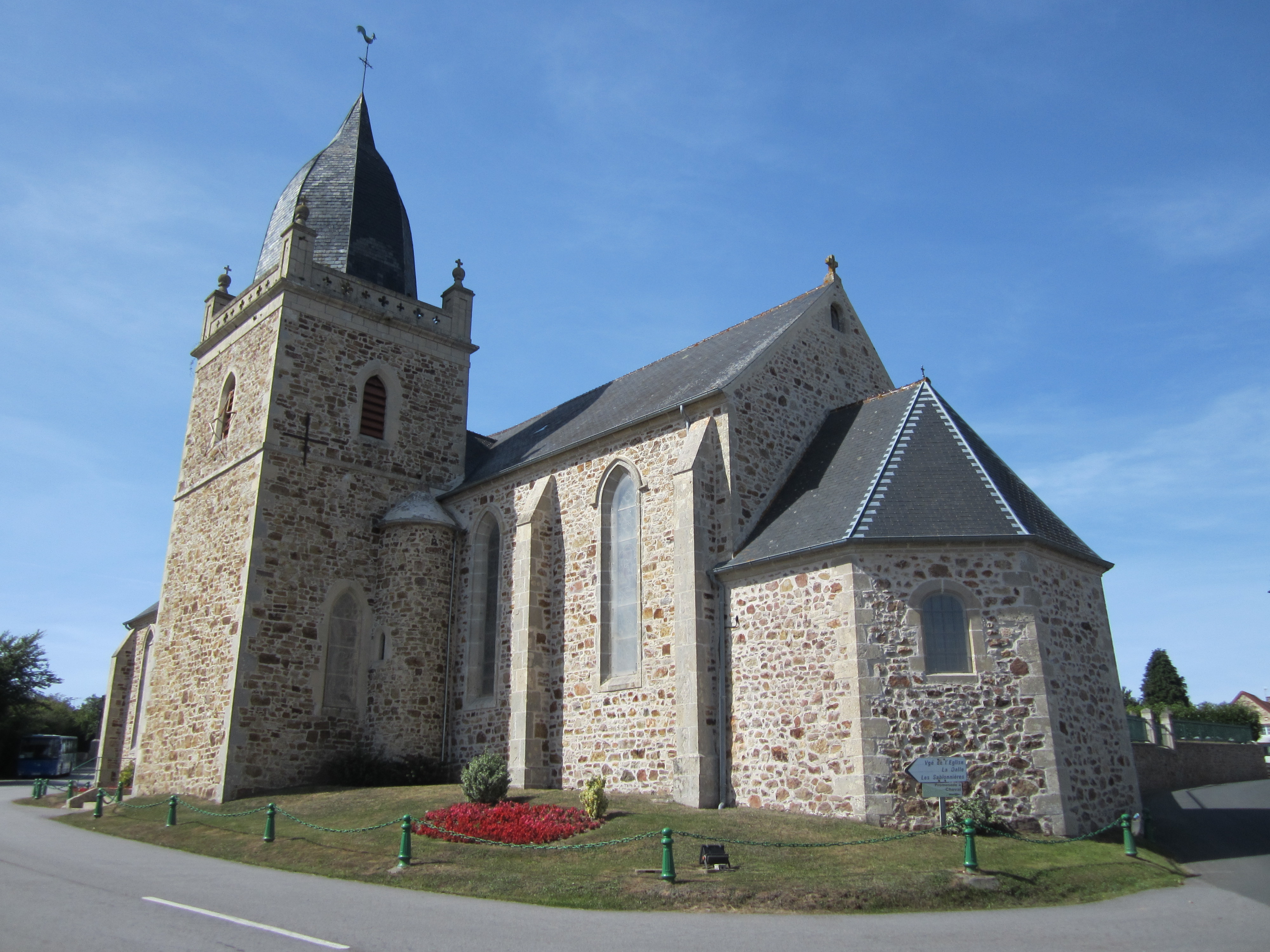
- The church of Saint-Siméon
- Location of L'Étang-Bertrand
- Location within France Location within Normandy
- Coordinates: 49°27′56″N 1°33′41″W
- Country: France
- Region: Normandy
- Department: Manche
- Arrondissement: Cherbourg
- Canton: Bricquebec-en-Cotentin
- Intercommunality: CA Cotentin

Government
  - Mayor (2020–2026): Michel Lechevalier
- Area^{1}: 8.74 km^{2} (3.37 sq mi)
- Elevation: 40 m (130 ft)
- Highest elevation: 81 m (266 ft)
- Lowest elevation: 9 m (30 ft)
- Population (2023): 350
  - Density: 40/km^{2} (100/sq mi)
- Time zone: UTC+01:00 (CET)
  - Summer (DST): UTC+02:00 (CEST)
- INSEE/Postal code: 50176 /50260
- ^{1} French Land Register data, which excludes lakes, ponds, glaciers > 1 km^{2} (0.386 sq mi or 247 acres) and river estuaries.

L'Étang-Bertrand (French pronunciation: [letɑ̃ bɛʁtʁɑ̃]) is a commune in the Manche department in Normandy in north-western France.

== See also ==
- Communes of the Manche department
- L'Oraille
