= Canton of Bricquebec-en-Cotentin =

Coordinates: 49°28′14″N 1°37′50″W

Bricquebec-en-Cotentin
- Canton
- Interactive map of Bricquebec-en-Cotentin
- Country: France
- Region: Normandy
- Department: Manche
- No. of communes: {{{nbcomm}}}
- Area: 337.29 km^{2} (130.23 sq mi)
- Population (2023): 17,978
  - Density: 53.301/km^{2} (138.05/sq mi)
- INSEE code: 50 04

The Canton of Bricquebec-en-Cotentin (before March 2020: canton of Bricquebec) in France is situated in the department of Manche and the region of Normandy. Its seat is in Bricquebec-en-Cotentin. At the French canton reorganisation which came into effect in March 2015, the canton was expanded from 14 to 33 communes (6 of which merged into the new commune Bricquebec-en-Cotentin):

- Besneville
- Biniville
- La Bonneville
- Breuville
- Bricquebec-en-Cotentin
- Catteville
- Colomby
- Crosville-sur-Douve
- L'Étang-Bertrand
- Étienville
- Golleville
- Hautteville-Bocage
- Magneville
- Morville
- Négreville
- Néhou
- Neuville-en-Beaumont
- Orglandes
- Rauville-la-Bigot
- Rauville-la-Place
- Reigneville-Bocage
- Rocheville
- Sainte-Colombe
- Saint-Jacques-de-Néhou
- Saint-Sauveur-le-Vicomte
- Sottevast
- Taillepied
