= Armorial of the Communes of Manche =

This page lists the armoury (emblazons=graphics and blazons=heraldic descriptions; or coats of arms) of the communes in la Manche. (Department 50)

== Communes without arms ==
The following communes don't have official arms, according to the information received from the city halls by La Banque du Blason, who were kind enough to provide the list:

Amfreville, Aumeville-Lestre, Boutteville, Brucheville, Carquebut, Colomby, Couville, Crosville-sur-Douve, Fierville-les-Mines, Flottemanville-Bocage, Gatteville-le-Phare, Gonneville, Gourbesville, Gréville-Hague, Helleville, Hemevez, Huberville, Jobourg, Martinvast, Le Mesnil, Négreville, Neuville-au-Plain, Omonville-la-Rogue, Quinéville, Rauville-la-Bigot, Rauville-la-Place, Ravenoville, Le Rozel, Saint-Germain-de-Varreville, Saint-Germain-des-Vaux, Saint-Jacques-de-Néhou, Saint-Martin-d'Audouville, Surville, Tocqueville, Valcanville, Vasteville, Vauville, Yvetot-Bocage. (non exhaustive list)

== A ==
Image	Name of Commune	French original blazon	English blazon
	Agon-Coutainville	écartelé : au premier et au quatrième de gueules aux trois léopards d'or rangés en barre, au deuxième coupé ondé au I d"azur plain et au II burelé ondé d'argent et d'azur de douze pièces, à la voile latine aussi d'argent, brochant, accompagnée de deux mouettes en chevron renversé du même rangées en bande en chef à senestre, au troisième de sinople à la tête de cheval contournée, senestrée d'un club de golf en barre soutenu d'une balle et surmontée d'une raquette de tennis en bande soutenue d'une balle à dextre, le tout d'argent	Quarterly: 1&4 Gules, in bend sinister 3 leopards bendwise; 2 Azure, per fess azure and barry argent and azure, a sail and in sinister chief 2 seagulls argent; 3 Vert, a horse head contourny between tennis racquet with a ball and a golf club with a ball argent.
	Angoville-sur-Ay	D'azur au chevron d'argent accompagné de trois croisettes d'or. Attribution douteuse: entrée à supprimer faute d'utilisation réellement officielle. Ce blason est celui de la famille du Mesnildot (subsistante), anciens seigneurs de Grattechef, à Angoville-sur-Ay.	Azure, a chevron argent between 3 crosses Or.
	Anneville-en-Saire	d'hermine à la fasce de gueules engrêlée en chef. Ce blason est emprunté aux armoiries d'une branche de la famille d'Anneville (éteinte), anciens seigneurs d'Anneville. La branche aînée des seigneurs de Chiffrevast à Tamerville portait une fasce simple.	Ermine, a fess engrailed in chief gules.
	Auderville	d'argent à la fasce de gueules chargée de deux léopards l'un sur l'autre accostés de deux fermaux, le tout d'or, accompagnée, en chef, d'une fleur de lys accostée de deux étoiles, et en pointe, du phare du lieu accosté de deux mouchetures d'hermine, tous de sable, le phare ajouré du champ et allumé d'or.	Argent, on a fess gules in pale 2 leopards between 2 buckles Or, in chief a fleur de lys between 2 mullets, and in base a lighthouse between 2 ermine spots sable, the lighthouse pierced of the field and lit Or.
	Avranches (sous-préfecture, former diocese)	D'azur à deux tours rondes jointes par un entremur, une porte au milieu d'argent, surmonté d'un dauphin contourné et couché du même, accosté de deux croissants d'or (Armorial général, 1696) D'azur à un château crénelé d'argent, flanqué de deux tours crénelées du même, accosté de deux fleurs de lys d'or; sommé d'un dauphin contourné et couché d'argent, surmonté d'une fleur de lis d'or, la fleur de lis accostée de deux croissants d'argent « D’azur, au château ou porte de ville entre deux tours crénelées d’argent, maçonnées de sable, surmontées d’un dauphin d’or posé en fasce, entre deux croissants d’argent aussi en fasce, avec trois fleurs de lis d’or, une en chef et les autres des deux côtés du château ».	Azure, a 2 towered castle argent, between 2 fleurs de lys Or, in chief a dolphin naiant contourny argent and above it a fleur de lys Or, between 2 crescents argent.???

== B ==
Image	Name of Commune	French original blazon	English blazon
	Barfleur	De gueules à un bar contourné d'argent posé en pal, surmonté d'une fleur de lis d'or	Gules, a seabass contourny palewise argent, and in chief a fleur de lys Or. (seabass=bar en français) Canting arms. of type "rebus" - bar=seabass + Fleur=flower (but the name Barfleur is actually of scandinavian origin : Barbefloth, Barba's river).
	Barneville-Carteret	De gueules à une tour d'argent maçonnée de sable, surmontée de quatre fusées accolées du même Ce blason est inspiré des armoiries de la famille de Carteret (subsistante à Jersey), seigneurs de Carteret jusqu'en 1204 (voir l'image). La tour représente le clocher fortifié de l'église de Barneville.	Gules, a tower argent masoned sable, and in chief, in fess 4 lozenges conjoined argent. These arms are based on those of the Carteret family, lords of Carteret to 1204.
	Baudre	D'argent au croissant de gueules, accompagné de six merlettes du même, posée trois en chef et trois en pointe, 2 et 1. Ce blason est emprunté aux armoiries de la famille de Baudre (éteinte), seigneurs de Saint-Ouen-de-Baudre (ancien nom de cette commune).	Argent, a crescent, between 6 marlets arranged 2 and 1 in chief, 2 and 1 in base gules.
	Beaumont-Hague	D'azur au chevron d'argent chargé de trois merlettes du champ, celles en pointe affrontées, et accompagné de trois trèfles d'or. Ce blason est emprunté aux armoiries de la famille Jallot (subsistante), seigneurs de Beaumont.	Azure, on a chevron argent between 3 trefoils Or, 3 martlets azure the 2 in the base respectant. These arms are taken from those of the Jallot family (surviving), lords of Beaumont.
	Belval	D'argent à la rose de gueules boutonnée d'or, pointée, tigée et feuillée de sinople, chaussé du même.	Argent, a rose gules seeded Or slipped and leaved vert, chaussé vert.
	La Bonneville	De sable à la croix ancrée d'or Attribution douteuse: entrée à supprimer faute d'utilisation réellement officielle. Ce blason est celui de la famille de Trousseauville, anciens seigneurs de la Bonneville.	Sable, a cross moline Or.
	Brécey	D'hermine au lion de gueules rampant. Ce blason est emprunté aux armoiries de la famille de Brécey, anciens seigneurs de Brécey jusqu'au XVe siècle.	Ermine, a lion rampant gules.
	Bréhal	coupé : au premier de gueules au léopard d'or accompagné de huit fleurs de lis du même, quatre rangées en chef et quatre rangées en pointe, au second d'azur aux trois coquilles d'or ordonnées 2 et 1	Per fess 1: Gules, a leopard between 8 fleurs de lys (4 above, 4 below); 2 Azure, 3 escallops Or.
	Bricquebec	D'or au lion de sinople armé et lampassé de gueules. Ce blason est emprunté aux armoiries de la famille Bertran (éteinte), anciens seigneurs de Bricquebec, Hambye et Fontenay-le-Pesnel.	Or, a lion vert armed and langued gules.

== C ==
Image	Name of Commune	French original blazon	English blazon
	Canisy	Vairé d'or et de gueules à la bande d'azur chargée d'un fer de moulin aussi d'or accosté de deux broyes du même. Le vairé d'or et de gueules est emprunté aux armoiries de la famille de Kergorlay, anciens seigneurs de Canisy, et propriétaire actuelle du château.	Vairy Or and gules, on a bend azure, a millrind between 2 horse-brays Or. The Vairy Or and gules is from the arms of the de Kergorlay family, former lords of Canisy and still owners of the castle.
	Carentan (ancienne sous-préfecture)	D'argent à l'aigle éployée de gueules, accostée de neuf billettes de même, 4, 2, 2 et 1; au chef d'azur chargé de trois fleurs de lys d'or (Armorial général, 1696)	Argent, an eagle displayed within 9 billets in orle gules, on a chief azure, 3 fleurs de lys Or.
	Carolles	D'azur à une nef équipée et habillée d'argent voguant sur des ondes du même, au chef de gueules chargé d'un léopard d'or.	Azure, a ship equipped on waves argent, on a chief gules a leopard Or.
	Cerisy-la-Salle	de sinople à la bande d'argent accostée de deux cotices du même, accompagnée, en chef, d'un lion léopardé d'or. Ce blason est emprunté aux armoiries de la famille Richier de Cerisy (éteinte), anciens seigneurs de Cerisy du XVe eu XVIIIe siècle.	Vert, a bend cotissed argent, and in chief a lion passant Or.
	Le Chefresne	Parti : au premier d'argent au frêne de sinople, au second d'azur à la croix huguenote d'or; le tout sommé d'un chef de gueules chargé d'un léopard d'or armé et lampassé d'azur.	Per pale argent and azure, a ash vert and a huguenot cross Or, and on a chief gules a leopard Or armed and langued azure.
	Cherbourg-Octeville (sous-préfecture)	D'azur à la fasce d'argent chargée de trois étoiles de six rais de sable, accompagnée de trois besants d'or Ce blason est emprunté aux armoiries de la ville de Cherbourg (réunie à Octeville), existant déjà depuis le XVIIe siècle (Armorial général, 1696).	Azure, on a fess argent between 3 bezants (Or), 3 mullets of 6 points sable.
	Condé-sur-Vire	De sinople à la rivière en bande ondée, accompagnée, en chef, d'un bœuf furieux et, en pointe, d'une cane à lait, le tout d'argent.	Vert, a bend wavy (river) between an enraged bull and a milk-can argent.
	Coutances (sous-préfecture, diocese)	D'azur à trois colonnes d'argent posées en pal, au chef cousu de gueules chargé d'un léopard d'or, armé et lampassé d'azur. (Armorial général, 1696)	Azure, in fess 3 columns argent, and on a chief gules, a leopard Or armed and langued azure.

== D ==
Image	Name of Commune	French original blazon	English blazon
	Denneville	d'azur à la fasce d'or accompagnée de trois roses d'argent Ce blason est celui de la famille Eustace de Denneville, anciens seigneurs puis propriétaires à Denneville.	Azure, a fess or between 3 roses argent. The armes are those of the Eustace de Denneville family, former lords and then proprietors of Denneville.
	Donville-les-Bains	De gueules au cheval mariné d'or surmonté d'un soleil de huit rais droits du même	Gules, a sea-horse, and in chief a sun of 8 points Or. NB: this is a sea-horse monster (a horse finned and with a fish tail), not a seahorse (the natural fish).
	Ducey	écartelé : au premier et au quatrième de gueules à trois coquilles d'or, au deuxième et au troisième d'azur à trois fleurs de lis d'or Ce blason est emprunté aux armoiries de la famille de Montgomery (éteinte), anciens seigneurs de Ducey.	Quarterly 1&4: Gules, 3 escallops Or; 2&3: Azure, 3 fleurs de lys Or.

== E ==
Image	Name of Commune	French original blazon	English blazon
	Équeurdreville-Hainneville	Coupé : au premier parti, au I d'azur aux trois coquilles d'or rangées en bande et au II de gueules à la tour d'or, au second de gueules au pont de quatre arches d'or sur des ondes de sinople mouvant de la pointe. Ce blason est emprunté en partie aux armoiries de l'ancienne abbaye Notre-Dame du Vœu de Cherbourg (en ruines), ancienne tenante de la seigneurie d'Équeurdreville.	Per fess 1: Per pale A: Azure, in bend 3 escallops Or and B: Gules, a tower Or; 2: Gules, a 4arched bridge Or issuant from a base engrailed (waves) vert.

== F ==
Image	Name of Commune	French original blazon	English blazon
	Flamanville	coupé d'azur à trois burelles d'argent surmontées d'un lion passant de même (qui est Bazan), et de gueules aux trois maisons d'or (qui est Sesmaisons).	Per fess 1: Azure, a lion passant and in base 3 barrulets argent; 2: Gules, 3 'maisons' (towers) Or. Upper part Bazan, lower part Sesmaisons.
	Flottemanville	parti : au premier de gueules aux trois losanges d'argent, au second de gueules au mont de trois coupeaux cousus de sinople, sommé d'une couronne d'or et d'une croix patriarcale issante du même. Attribution douteuse: entrée à supprimer faute d'utilisation réellement officielle. Ce blason est celui de la famille du Moncel (éteinte), anciens seigneurs de Flottemanville, parti de Hongrie, d'après un fronton sculpté du XVIIe siècle au château de la Cour de Flottemanville.	

== G ==
Image	Name of Commune	French original blazon	English blazon
	La Glacerie	d'azur au chevron d'argent chargé en chef d'une rose de gueules, surmonté d'une fleur de lys d'or, accompagné en chef de deux miroirs d'argent bordés d'or et en pointe d'une trangle aussi de gueules sommée d'un clocher d'argent.	Azure, a chevron argent charged near the point with a rose gules, between 2 plates fimbriated Or (mirrors) and a belltower argent issuant from a barrulet gules, in chief a fleur de lys Or.
	Gouville-sur-Mer	Parti : au premier de sinople aux trois coqs d'or démembrés en girouette, crêtés et barbés de gueules, rangés en pal, le deuxième contourné, au second d'azur à la tour de phare d'argent sommée d'un feu rayonnant d'or, ajourée et maçonnée de sable, posée sur un rocher aussi d'argent issant d'une onde alésée du même.	Per pale 1: Vert, in pale 3 cocks Or, crested gules, 2nd one contourny; 2: Azure, a lighthouse argent pierced and masoned sable, enflamed Or, arising from a rock from a bar wavy couped (wave) argent.
	Granville	D'azur à un dextrochère armé d'or mouvant d'une nuée du même et tenant une épée d'argent garnie d'or, surmonté d'un soleil du même.	Azure, an armed dextrochere issuant from a cloud issuant from sinister Or, maintaining a sword argent garnished Or, and in chief a sun Or. NB a dextrochere is a right arm (literally right hand)
	Gréville-Hague	D'argent à la heuse (botte) contournée de sable éperonnée d'or. Attribution douteuse: entrée à supprimer faute d'utilisation réellement officielle. Ce blason est celui de la famille Heuzé, anciens seigneurs du Val-Ferrand à Gréville.	
	Grosville	Coupé : au premier d'azur au croissant d'or accosté, en chef, de deux tours d'argent ouvertes et ajourées du champ, maçonnées de sable, le tout surmonté de trois étoiles aussi d'or rangées en chef, au second parti au I d'argent à l'aigle de sable becquée et membrée d'or et au II d'azur aux trois fasces haussées d'argent, au chevron de gueules brochant, le tout soutenu d'une rose aussi d'argent.	Per fess 1: Azure, a crescent Or between 2 towers argent open and pierced of the field, masoned sable, and in chief in fess 3 mullets Or; 2: per pale A: Argent, an eagle (displayed) sable membered Or, and B: Azure, 3 fesses enhanced argent, overall a chevron gules, in base a rose argent.

== H ==
Image	Name of Commune	French original blazon	English blazon
	Hambye	D'or aux deux fasces d'azur, accompagnées de neuf merlettes de gueules ordonnées en orle. Ce blason est emprunté aux armoiries de la famille Paynel ou Painel (éteinte), anciens seigneurs de la Haye-Pesnel et la baronnie de Hambye.	Or, 2 fesses azure between 10 martlets in orle gules.
	La Haye-du-Puits	de gueules à l'aigle d'argent. Ce blason est emprunté aux armoiries de la famille de Magneville (éteinte), anciens seigneurs de la baronnie de la Haye-du-Puits.	Gules, an eagle (displayed) argent. These arms are borrowed from the de Magneville family (extinct), former lords of the barony la Haye-du-Puits.
	La Haye-Pesnel	D'or aux deux fasces d'azur, accompagnées de neuf merlettes de gueules ordonnées en orle. Ce blason est emprunté aux armoiries de la famille Paynel ou Painel (éteinte), anciens seigneurs de la Haye-Pesnel et la baronnie de Hambye.	Or, 2 fesses azure, between 10 martlets in orle gules.
	Houesville	D’azur à trois pommes d’or tigées et feuillées du même, au chef cousu de gueules à deux léopards affrontés d’or, armés et lampassés d’azur. Ce blason est emprunté aux armoiries de la famille Le Sauvage, anciens seigneurs d'Houesville et de Caudard.	Azure, 3 apples slipped and leaved Or, on a chief gules, 2 leopards respectant Or, armed and langued azure.
	Houtteville	Coupé de sable et d'or. Ce blason est emprunté aux armoiries de la famille de Houtteville, seigneurs de la Motte.	Per fess, sable and Or.

== J ==
Image	Name of Commune	French original blazon	English blazon
	Jullouville	D'argent à trois canettes de sable posées deux et un.	Argent, 3 ducks sable.
	Juvigny-le-Tertre	Ecartelé : au premier d'argent à trois besants d'or, au deuxième et au troisième d'argent à la croix ancrée d'azur, au quatrième d'argent à un besant d'or.	Quarterly 1: argent 3 bezants; 2&3 Argent, a cross moline azure; 4: Argent, a bezant Or.

== L ==
Image	Name of Commune	French original blazon	English blazon
	Lapenty	D'azur à la tour d'argent.	Azure, a tower argent.
	Lessay	De sable à l'essette contournée d'or.	Sable, an adze Or, blade to sinister.

== M ==
Image	Name of Commune	French original blazon	English blazon
	Marigny	D'azur au chevron d'or, accompagné de deux roses en chef et d'un lion en pointe, le tout d'or.	Azure, a chevron between 2 roses and a lion Or.
	La Meauffe	De sinople à la fasce ondée d'argent accompagnée, en chef, de deux fleurs de lys d'or et, en pointe, d'un saumon aussi d'argent.	Vert, a fess wavy argent between 2 fleurs de lys Or, and a salmon argent.
	Le Mesnilbus	D'azur au chevron d'or, accompagné de trois étoiles du même en chef et d'un fer de lance d'argent en pointe. (le blasonnement avait dit 'deux' étoiles, mais la banque du blason, et le blason ici ont trois étoiles, tous les deux.)	Azure, a chevron between 3 mullets Or and a lancehead argent.
	Le Mont-Saint-Michel	d'azur aux deux fasces ondées de sinople et brochant sur le tout, à deux saumons d'argent posés en barre, rangés en pal, celui du chef contourné.	Azure, 2 fesses wavy vert, overall in pale 2 salmon bendwise sinister argent, the one in chief contourny.
	Montchaton	Taillé : au premier de sinople au saumon contourné bondissant d'argent, au second de sable au casque romain d'argent crêté de gueules taré de demi-profil; le tout sommé d'un chef de gueules chargé d'une croisette ancrée d'argent.	Per bend sinister vert and sable, a salmon contourny 'leaping' and a Roman helmet argent crested gules, and on a chief gules a cross moline argent.
	Montebourg	De gueules à la croix ancrée d'or.	Gules, a cross moline Or.
	Montpinchon	D'or au mont de sinople chargé de deux clefs d'argent passées en sautoir et sommé de trois pins de sable surmontés de trois annelets de gueules rangés en chef. Canting arms. type rébus mont+pin; les trois annelets ajoutés en chef empruntés au blason de la famille Caillebot de La Salle, anciens seigneurs de Montpinchon et de Cerisy (de gueules à 6 annelets d'Or 3, 2, 1).	Or, on a mount vert 2 keys in saltire argent, issuant from the mount 3 pine trees sable, and in chief in fess 3 annulets gules. Canting arms. rebus mount+pine; the 3 annulets are a reference to the arms of the Caillebot de La Salle family, former lords of Montpinchon and Cerisy
	Mortain (ancienne sous-préfecture)	D'azur semé de fleurs de lys d'or à la bande componée d'argent et de gueules. Ce blason est emprunté aux armoiries de la famille d'Évreux-Navarre (éteinte, branche des Capétiens), anciens comtes de Mortain et d'Évreux et rois de Navarre.	Azure, semy de lys Or, a bend compony argent and gules. arms borrowed from d'Évreux-Navarre, former counts of Mortain and kings of Navarre.
	La Mouche	D’azur à trois mains dextres d’argent, au chef de gueules chargé de deux crosses épiscopales d’or posées en sautoir. Ce blason est inspiré de celui de la famille de La Mouche (éteinte), auquel est ajouté le chef et les crosses.	Azure, 3 hands appaumy argent, on a chief gules, 2 episcopal croziers in saltire Or.
	Moyon	D'or à la croix dentelée de sable. Attribution douteuse: entrée à supprimer faute d'utilisation réellement officielle. Ce blason est celui de la famille de Moyon, anciens barons avant le XIIIe siècle.	

== N ==
Image	Name of Commune	French original blazon	English blazon
	Notre-Dame-de-Cenilly	d’azur aux deux flèches d’argent passées en sautoir, accompagnées, en chef à senestre, de la Vierge de carnation habillée et couronnée d’or tenant, de sa main dextre, un sceptre fleurdelysé du même et soutenant, de son bras senestre, l'enfant Jésus aussi de carnation habillé aussi d'or, au franc-quartier de gueules chargé de deux léopards d’or armés et lampassés aussi de gueules passant l'un sur l'autre (création : Bernard Le Ny, adoptée par délibération municipale du 11 décembre 2008)	Azure, 2 arrows in saltire argent, on a canton gules, 2 leopards Or, armed and langued azure, and in sinister chief, a Virgin crowned, holding a sceptre fleury in her right hand, and in the left, the baby Jesus Or.

== O ==
Image	Name of Commune	French original blazon	English blazon
	Octeville	de sinople au mantel d'argent chargé de deux lettres capitales de sable "O" à dextre, "V" à sénestre, au chef de gueules à un léopard d'or armé et lampassé d'azur.	Per chevron argent and vert, 2 capital letters "O" and "V" sable, and on a chief gules, a leopard Or armed and langued azure.
	Ouville	D'argent à la croix latine d'azur accostée de deux fleurs de lys du même.	Argent, a Latin cross between to fleurs de lys azure.

== P ==
Image	Name of Commune	French original blazon	English blazon
	Percy	De sable au chef dentelé d'or. Ce blason est emprunté aux armoiries de la famille de Percy, seigneurs de Montchamps, Maisoncelle etc...	Sable, a chief indented Or. these arems are borrowed from the de Percy family, lords of Montchamps, Maisoncelle etc.
	Périers	D'argent au poirier arraché de sinople soutenu d'une trangle de gueules, accompagné de deux lions de sable, l'un en chef à senestre, l'autre contourné en pointe à dextre, à la bande d'azur chargée de trois molettes d'éperon d'or brochant sur le tout.	Argent, a pear tree eradicated vert and in base a barrulet gules, overall on a bend azure between 2 lions sable, 3 mullets pierced (spur-rowels) Or.
	Picauville	D’or à la couronne d’épines de sable accompagnée de trois maillets de sinople – au chef de gueules chargé d’un léopard d’or.	Or, a crown of thorns sable between 3 mallets vert, and on a chief gules a leopard Or.
	Pirou	De sinople à la bande d'argent côtoyée de deux cotices du même. Ce blason est emprunté aux armoiries de la famille de Pirou (éteinte), anciens seigneurs de Pirou.	Vert, a bend cotissed argent. These arms are borrowed from the de Pirou family (extinct), former lords of Pirou.
	Pontorson	De gueules au pont de trois arches d'argent sur une rivière du même, sommé de deux cygnes adossés aussi d'argent, surmonté d'un écusson d'azur semé de fleurs de lys d'or brisé d'un lambel d'argent.	Gules, a 3-arched bridge issuant from a base wavy (river), atop the bridge 2 swans adorsed argent; in chief an inescutcheon Azure semy de lys Or, a label argent.
	Portbail	d'azur au chevron abaissé d'or, accompagné de trois étoiles du même rangées en chef et d'un fer de lance d'argent en pointe (adopté par délibération municipale en 1958) Ce blason est emprunté à la famille Hellouin, anciens seigneurs et partie de Portbail et de Gouey.	Azure, a chevron abased, between in fess 3 mullets Or and a lancehead argent.

== Q ==
Image	Name of Commune	French original blazon	English blazon
	Querqueville	De gueules à une chapelle antique trifoliée d'or, au chef cousu d'azur chargé de trois abeilles d'or.	Gules, a trefoil chapel Or, pierced and open sable, on a chief azure, 3 bees Or.
	Quettehou	D'argent à l'aigle de gueules becquée et armée d'or, à la bordure de sable chargée de douze besants aussi d'or. Attribution douteuse: entrée à supprimer faute d'utilisation réellement officielle. Ce blason est emprunté aux armoiries de la famille de Mons (subsistente), seigneurs de Thybosville à Quettehou aux XVIe-XVIIe siècles.	
	Quinéville	D'azur au chevron d'argent accompagné de trois croisettes d'or. Attribution douteuse: entrée à supprimer faute d'utilisation réellement officielle. Ce blason est celui de la famille du Mesnildot, seigneurs de Quinéville au XVIIIe siècle.	

== R ==
Image	Name of Commune	French original blazon	English blazon
	Remilly-sur-Lozon	Fascé d'or et de gueules, les fasces chargées de seize tourteaux ou besants de l'un et de l'autre, ordonnés 3, 3, 3, 3, 3 et 1. (source:newgaso.fr)	Barry Or and gules, semy of roundels counterchanged.
	Réville	De gueules à la croix alésée d'argent pommetée de trois pièces d'or à chaque extrémité. Attribution douteuse: entrée à supprimer faute d'utilisation réellement officielle. Ce blason est celui de la famille Fouquet, seigneurs de Réville au XVIIe siècle.	
	Le Rozel	D'azur à la croix haussée d'argent posée sur une terrasse de sinople d'où sort un cep de vigne du même qui ondoie autour du montant de la croix accompagnée de quatre flammes d'argent ordonnées 2 et 2. Attribution douteuse: entrée à supprimer faute d'utilisation réellement officielle. Ce blason est celui de la famille Bignon, seigneurs du Rozel par mariage de Jérôme-Frédéric Bignon avec Marie-Bernardine de Hennot du Rozel, dame du Rozel.	

== S ==
Image	Name of Commune	French original blazon	English blazon
	Saint-Amand	Fuselé d'argent et de gueules. Ce blason est emprunté aux armoiries de la famille Grimaldi (de Goyon-Matignon, éteinte, anciens comtes de Torigni), anciens seigneurs de Saint-Amand.	Lozengy argent and gules. These arms are borrowed from the Grimaldi family (of Goyon-Matignon, extinct, former counts of Torigni), former lords of Saint-Amand.
	Saint-Fromond	D'argent aux trois fleurs de lys de gueules. Ce blason est emprunté aux armoiries de la famille du Hommet (éteinte), anciens seigneurs de Saint-Fromond et de la baronnie du Hommet.	Argent, 3 fleurs de lys gules. These arms are borrowed from the du Hommet family (extinct), former lords of Saint-Fromond and of the barony Hommet.
	Saint-Hilaire-du-Harcouët	De gueules à la tour d'argent surmontée de trois étoiles d'or.	Gules, a tower argent, and in chief 3 mullets Or.
	Saint-James	De gueules à la porte d'argent flanquée de deux tours d'or, celle de senestre plus élevée que l'autre, accompagnée de quatre coquilles aussi d'argent, une en chef et trois en pointe ordonnées 2 et 1	Gules, a gate argent flanked by 2 towers the sinister one taller Or, all masoned sable, in chief 1 escallop and in base 3 escallops argent.
	Saint-Lô (préfecture)	de gueules à la licorne saillante d'argent, au chef cousu d'azur chargé de trois fleurs de lys d'or De gueules à une licorne furieuse d'argent, accornée d'or, au franc-quartier dextre d'azur, chargé d'une étoile rayonnante d'or.	Gules, a unicorn salient argent, on a chief azure, 3 fleurs de lys Or.
	Saint-Lô-d'Ourville	D'azur au cygne d'argent becqué et membré de gueules, au chef d'or chargé de trois merlettes de sable.	Azure, a swan argent beaked and membered gules, on a chief Or, 3 martlets sable.
	Saint-Marcouf	D'azur à deux ancres passées en sautoir celle en barre brochante, les gumènes entrelacées le tout d'argent, au chef bastillé de cinq pièces aussi d'argent chargé d'un sabre d'abordage de gueules en fasce la pointe à dextre.	Azure, 2 anchors in saltire, hawsers interlaced, and on a chief embattled argent a boarding cutlass point to dexter gules.
	Saint-Pair-sur-Mer	d'azur à cinq annelets d'or, ordonnés 3 et 2, soutenus d'une jumelle ondée d'argent.	Azure, 5 annulets Or, 3 and 2, in base 2 barrulets wavy argent.
	Saint-Pierre-Église	Taillé : au premier à la tour de l'église du lieu d'argent maçonnée de sable mouvant du trait de partition, au second de gueules à la croix latine renversée d'or accostée de deux clefs aux anneaux en losange pommetée adossées du même.	Per bend sinister 1: Azure, a church tower argent masoned sable dimidiated; 2: Gules, a Latin cross inverted between 2 keys adorsed Or.
	Saint-Pierre-Langers	D'or à la croix de gueules, au chef d'azur chargé de deux étoiles d'argent. Ce blason est emprunté à la famille L'Empereur, seigneurs de Saint-Pierre-Langers.	Or, a cross gules, on a chief azure 2 mullets argent. These arms are borrowed from the L'Empereur family, lords of Saint-Pierre-Langers.
	Saint-Sauveur-le-Vicomte	de gueules aux deux fasces accompagnées d'un château de trois tours en cœur et de six bars adossés et accolés deux à deux, quatre en chef et deux en pointe, le tout d'or. Ce blason est inspiré des armoiries de la famille de Harcourt (subsistente), anciens seigneurs de la baronnie de Saint-Sauveur, et qui porte : de gueules à deux fasces d'or.	Gules, 2 fesses, in center point a triple towered castle, all between 3 pairs of sea-bass adorsed Or.
	Saint-Senier-sous-Avranches	Taillé : au premier de gueules à la main dextre appaumée d'argent, au second mi-taillé d'azur aux deux fasces d'argent accompagnées de neuf merlettes contournées du même ordonnées 3, 3 et 3.	Per bend sinister 1: Gules, a hand appaumy argent 2: Azure, 2 fesses and 9 martlets countourny argent (dimidiated).
	Sainte-Marie-du-Mont	D'or au gousset d'azur chargé d'une épée d'argent surmontée d'un drakkar du même, la voile surchargée d'un léopard de gueules, ledit gousset accosté de deux fleurs de lys du même.	Azure, in pale a drakkar and sword argent (the sail charged with a leopard gules), between 2 gussets Or each charged with a fleur de lys gules. NB: an English 'gusset' is one of the bits to the side. A French «gousset» is the equivalent long bit in the middle.
	Sainte-Mère-Église	d'azur à une église d'argent, couverte d'or et surmontée de deux étoiles sautant en parachute aussi d'argent, l'église chargée des lettres A et M capitales de sable et posée sur une champagne de gueules chargée d'un léopard aussi d'or Ce blason est inspiré de l'épisode de la libération de cette bourgade le 6 juin 1944 par les troupes alliées (dessin de Robert Louis).	Argent, a church argent roofed Or charged with the capital letters A and M sable, issuant from a base gules charged with a leopard Or; in chief 2 mullets Or hanging from parachutes argent.
	Saussemesnil	Taillé : au premier d'azur au pot à une anse au naturel senestré, en chef, d'une lettre S capitale de gueules °, au second de sinople aux deux peupliers arrachés au naturel rangés en barre, celui du chef plus épais, adextrés, en pointe, d'une lettre R capitale de gueules °, le tout soutenu d'une plaine d'azur °; au bâton en barre de gueules ° brochant sur la partition.	Per bend sinister 1: Azure, a one handled pot proper and a capital letter S gules; 2: vert, 2 poplar trees eradicated proper, and to dexter the capital letter R gules, and a base azure; overall a bend sinister gules.
	Savigny-le-Vieux	D'or à la tige de fougère feuillée de sept pièces de sinople, une lettre S capitale de sable brochant en pointe sur la tige, au chef ondé de gueules chargé de deux léopards affrontés du champ.	
	Sourdeval	D'or fretté de sable au franc-quartier de même. Ce blason est emprunté (se resemble?) aux armoiries de la famille de Verdun (subsistente), anciens seigneurs de la baronnie de Sourdeval.	Or fretty sable, a canton sable. These arms are borrowed from (or recall?) the de Verdun family (surviving), former lords of the barony of Sourdeval.

== T ==
Image	Name of Commune	French original blazon	English blazon
	Le Teilleul	D'azur à trois fers à cheval d'argent, posés 2 et 1.	Azure, 3 horseshoes argent.
	Tessy-sur-Vire	De gueules au pont de trois arches d'argent maçonné de sable posé sur des ondes d'azur mouvant de la pointe.	Gules, a 3-arched bridge argent masoned sable issuant from a base engrailed azure (waves).
	Torigni-sur-Vire	D'azur au château d'argent donjonné de deux tours enflammées du même. Canting arms. Forme "rébus"=Tour+ignis=tours en flamme. Mais Torigni vient du bas Latin:Toriniacum, domaine de Taurin.)	Azure, a 2-towered castle enflamed argent. Canting arms. Form "rébus"=Tour (tower) +ignis (fire) = towers aflame. Actually, the name Torigni comes from low Latin:Toriniacum, domain of Taurin.)
	Tourlaville	D'azur à une tour d'argent, au chevron d'or brochant sur le tout. Canting arms. évocation directe: Tour-la-ville. (Mais Tourlaville vient du scandinave : Torlachvilla, domaine de Torlack.)	Azure, a tower argent, overall a chevron argent.
	Tréauville	Coupé : au premier d'azur aux deux jumelles d'argent surmontées d'un lion léopardé du même armé, lampassé et couronné d'or, le fouet de la queue du même (famille Basan de Flamanville, anciens seigneurs); au second d'argent au chef de gueules, au pal de sable brochant accosté de deux demi-vols adossés aussi de gueules. Ce blason est inspiré de ceux de la famille, en 1, Basan de Flamanville (éteinte), seigneurs de Tréauville en partie (marquisat de Flamanville); et en 2, de la famille Le Pelley (éteinte), seigneurs de la Houssaye, à Tréauville.	Per fess 1: Azure, 2 barulets argent below a lion passant argent armed, langued, crowned and tailed Or; 2: Argent, a chief gules, overall a pale sable, between 2 demi-vols gules.
	La Trinité	D'azur à la fasce d'or chargée d'un tourteau de sable accosté de deux coquilles de gueules, accompagnée, en chef à senestre, d'une fleur de lys aussi d'or et, en pointe, d'un lion d'argent tenant une hallebarde d'or.	Azure, on a fess Or a pellet (sable) between 2 escallops gules, in sinister chief a fleur de lys Or, and in base a lion argent maintaining a halbard Or.

== U ==
Image	Name of Commune	French original blazon	English blazon
	Urville-Nacqueville	De gueules au léopard d'or armé et lampassé du champ, surmonté de deux lettres U et N capitales gothiques aussi d'or.	Gules, a leopard Or, armed and langued gules, in chief 2 gothic capital letters, U and N, Or.

== V ==
Image	Name of Commune	French original blazon	English blazon
	Valognes	D'azyr au lynx courant d'argent, accompagné de deux épis de blé, un à dextre, un à senestre, en pal, d'or, et surmonté de deux autres épis de blé, en sautoir, du même.	Azure, a lynx courant argent between in chief 2 stalks of wheat crossed in saltire and in base 2 stalks palewise Or.
	Villedieu-les-Poêles	Parti d'argent à la croix alésée de gueules et d'or aux dix-huit billettes de sable posées, 4,5,4,3,2, surmonté d'un chef d'azur à la croix alésée d'argent. Ces armoiries sont une création librement interprétée à partir d'un vestige conservé à la Mairie de Villedieu : une clef d'arc en granit armoriée et datée de 1696 provenant sans doute de l'ancienne commanderie, où comme l'indique Édouard Le Héricher, de l'ancien Pont-de-Pierre, que fit réparer le commandeur de Rochechouart en 1696, en même temps que d'autres travaux faits dans « l'île Billeheust ». La composition originale comprend deux écus ovales accolés. Le premier orné d'une croix. Le second de billette et d'un chef possédant une croix. Il s'agit en fait des deux écus accolés de l'ordre de Saint-Jean de Jérusalem (de gueules à la croix d'argent) et de celles de frère de Rochechouart, commandeur de Villedieu à cette époque (de gueules à trois fasces nébulées d’argent, au chef de gueules à la croix d'argent). Ce chef, avec le collier de Malte et la croix de Malte comme ornement était ajouté au blason familial des frères profès. Sur la pierre armoriée, ces fasces nébulées sont nettement reconnaissables.	Per pale 1: Argent, a cross couped gules; and 2: Or, 18 billets sable 4,5,4,3,2, and on a chief azure, a cross couped argent.
	Villiers-Fossard	D'azur au chevron d'or accompagné de trois aigles d'argent, à la bordure aussi d'or. Ce blason est inspiré de celui de la famille Le Jollis de Villiers, anciens seigneurs de Villiers-Fossard.	Azure, a chevron Or between 3 eagles argent, within a bordure Or.
