= Rozel =

Rozel may refer to:

- Le Rozel, Manche, Basse-Normandie, France
- Rozel, Kansas, United States
- Vingtaine de Rozel, Jersey
