= Lieusaint =

Lieusaint is the name of several places in France:

- Lieusaint, Manche, in the Manche département
- Lieusaint, Seine-et-Marne, in the Seine-et-Marne département
