= Lestre =

- Commune
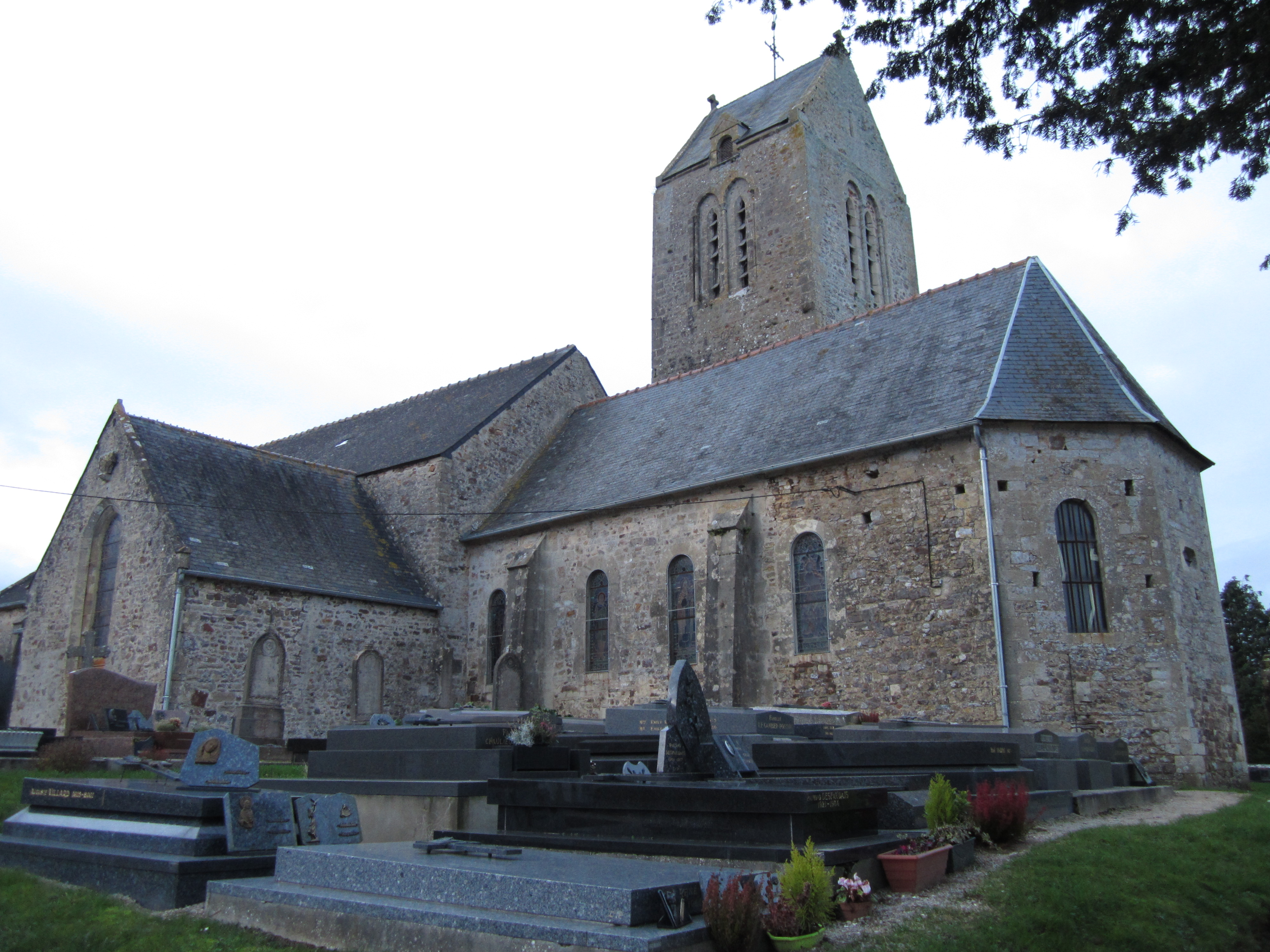
- The church of Saint-Martin
- Location of Lestre
- Location within France Location within Normandy
- Coordinates: 49°31′37″N 1°20′01″W
- Country: France
- Region: Normandy
- Department: Manche
- Arrondissement: Cherbourg
- Canton: Valognes
- Intercommunality: Cotentin

Government
  - Mayor (2020–2026): Sylvie Amiot
- Area^{1}: 7.57 km^{2} (2.92 sq mi)
- Elevation: 30 m (98 ft)
- Highest elevation: 45 m (148 ft)
- Lowest elevation: 1 m (3.3 ft)
- Population (2023): 242
  - Density: 32.0/km^{2} (82.8/sq mi)
- Time zone: UTC+01:00 (CET)
  - Summer (DST): UTC+02:00 (CEST)
- INSEE/Postal code: 50268 /50310
- ^{1} French Land Register data, which excludes lakes, ponds, glaciers > 1 km^{2} (0.386 sq mi or 247 acres) and river estuaries.

Lestre is a commune in the Manche department in Normandy in north-western France.

== See also ==
- Communes of the Manche department
