= Écausseville =

- Commune
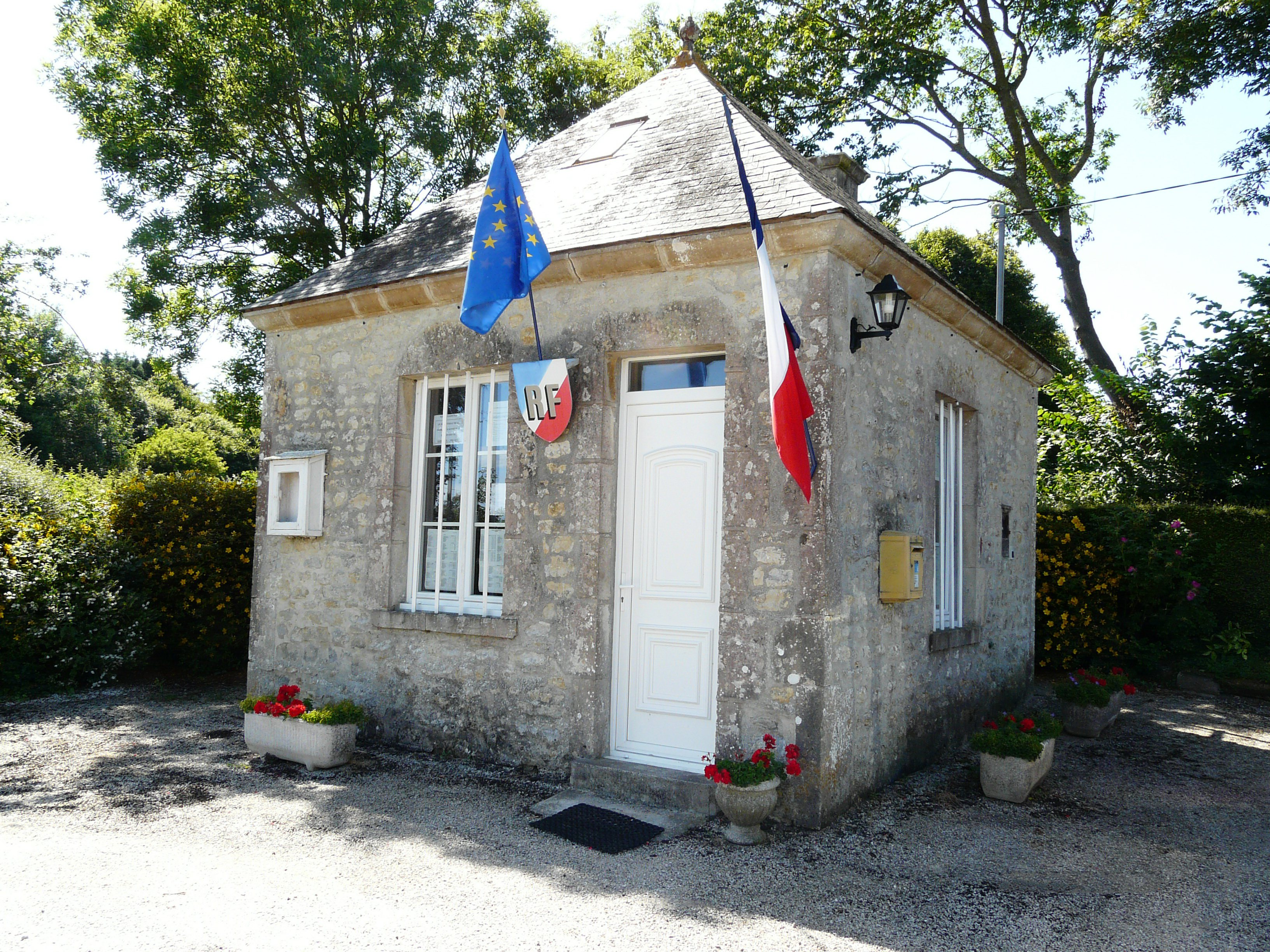
- The town hall
- Location of Écausseville
- Location within France Location within Normandy
- Coordinates: 49°27′47″N 1°22′23″W
- Country: France
- Region: Normandy
- Department: Manche
- Arrondissement: Cherbourg
- Canton: Valognes
- Intercommunality: CA Cotentin

Government
  - Mayor (2020–2026): André Groult
- Area^{1}: 5.27 km^{2} (2.03 sq mi)
- Elevation: 8 m (26 ft)
- Highest elevation: 31 m (102 ft)
- Lowest elevation: 3 m (9.8 ft)
- Population (2023): 112
  - Density: 21.3/km^{2} (55.0/sq mi)
- Time zone: UTC+01:00 (CET)
  - Summer (DST): UTC+02:00 (CEST)
- INSEE/Postal code: 50169 /50310
- ^{1} French Land Register data, which excludes lakes, ponds, glaciers > 1 km^{2} (0.386 sq mi or 247 acres) and river estuaries.

Écausseville (French pronunciation: [ekosvil]) is a commune in the Manche department in Normandy in north-western France.

== See also ==
- Communes of the Manche department
