= Émondeville =

- Commune
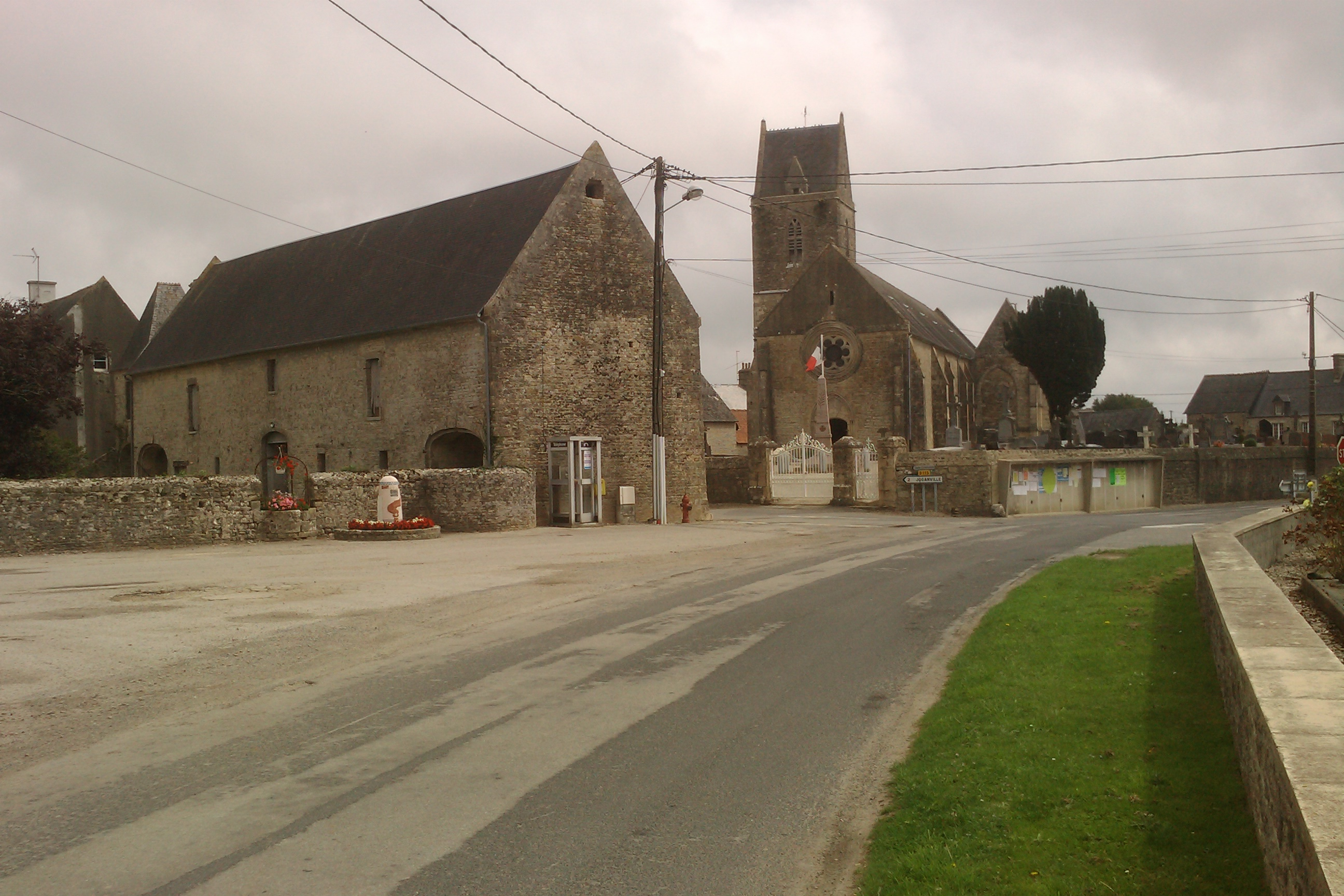
- The church and surroundings in Émondeville

- Coat of arms
- Location of Émondeville
- Location within France Location within Normandy
- Coordinates: 49°27′35″N 1°20′29″W
- Country: France
- Region: Normandy
- Department: Manche
- Arrondissement: Cherbourg
- Canton: Valognes
- Intercommunality: CA Cotentin

Government
  - Mayor (2020–2026): Loïc Provaux
- Area^{1}: 5.33 km^{2} (2.06 sq mi)
- Highest elevation: 37 m (121 ft)
- Lowest elevation: 7 m (23 ft)
- Population (2023): 341
  - Density: 64.0/km^{2} (166/sq mi)
- Demonym: Émondevillais
- Time zone: UTC+01:00 (CET)
  - Summer (DST): UTC+02:00 (CEST)
- INSEE/Postal code: 50172 /50310
- ^{1} French Land Register data, which excludes lakes, ponds, glaciers > 1 km^{2} (0.386 sq mi or 247 acres) and river estuaries.

Émondeville (French pronunciation: [emɔ̃dvil]) is a commune in the Manche department in Normandy in northwestern France.

== See also ==
- Communes of the Manche department
