= Canton of Valognes =

Coordinates: 49.51°N 1.47°W

The canton of Valognes is an administrative division of the Manche department, northwestern France. Its borders were modified at the French canton reorganisation which came into effect in March 2015. Its seat is in Valognes.

It consists of the following communes:

1. Azeville
2. Brix
3. Écausseville
4. Émondeville
5. Éroudeville
6. Flottemanville
7. Fontenay-sur-Mer
8. Fresville
9. Le Ham
10. Hémevez
11. Huberville
12. Joganville
13. Lestre
14. Lieusaint
15. Montaigu-la-Brisette
16. Montebourg
17. Ozeville
18. Quinéville
19. Saint-Cyr-Bocage
20. Saint-Floxel
21. Saint-Germain-de-Tournebut
22. Saint-Joseph
23. Saint-Marcouf
24. Saint-Martin-d'Audouville
25. Saussemesnil
26. Sortosville
27. Tamerville
28. Urville
29. Valognes
30. Vaudreville
31. Yvetot-Bocage
