= Saint-Floxel =

- Commune
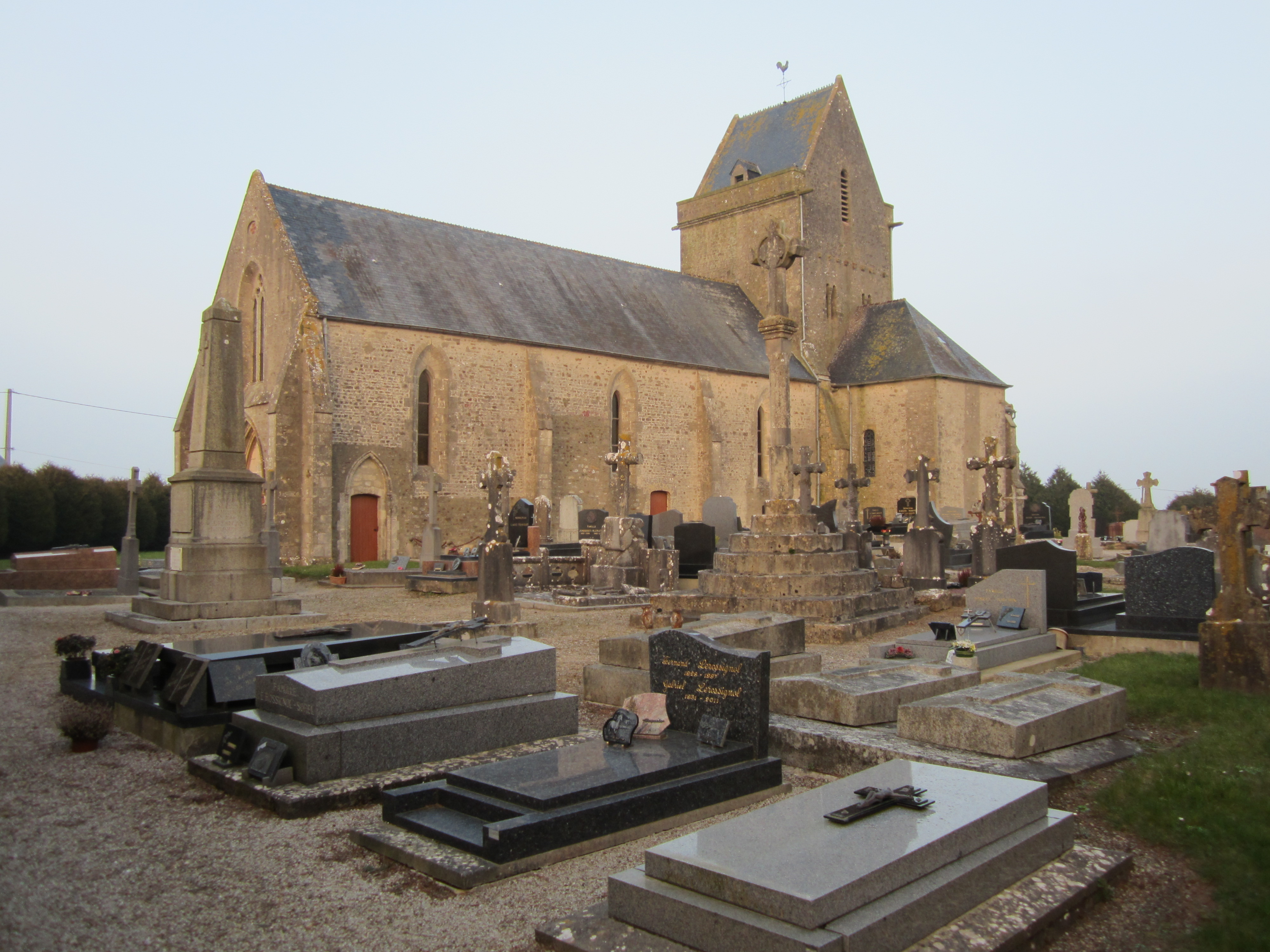
- The church of Saint Floxel
- Location of Saint-Floxel
- Location within France Location within Normandy
- Coordinates: 49°29′34″N 1°20′59″W
- Country: France
- Region: Normandy
- Department: Manche
- Arrondissement: Cherbourg
- Canton: Valognes
- Intercommunality: CA Cotentin

Government
  - Mayor (2020–2026): Joël Guilbert
- Area^{1}: 8.45 km^{2} (3.26 sq mi)
- Elevation: 40 m (130 ft)
- Population (2023): 489
  - Density: 57.9/km^{2} (150/sq mi)
- Time zone: UTC+01:00 (CET)
  - Summer (DST): UTC+02:00 (CEST)
- INSEE/Postal code: 50467 /50310
- ^{1} French Land Register data, which excludes lakes, ponds, glaciers > 1 km^{2} (0.386 sq mi or 247 acres) and river estuaries.

Saint-Floxel (French pronunciation: [sɛ̃ flɔksɛl]) is a commune in the Manche department in Normandy in north-western France.
