= Joganville =

- Commune
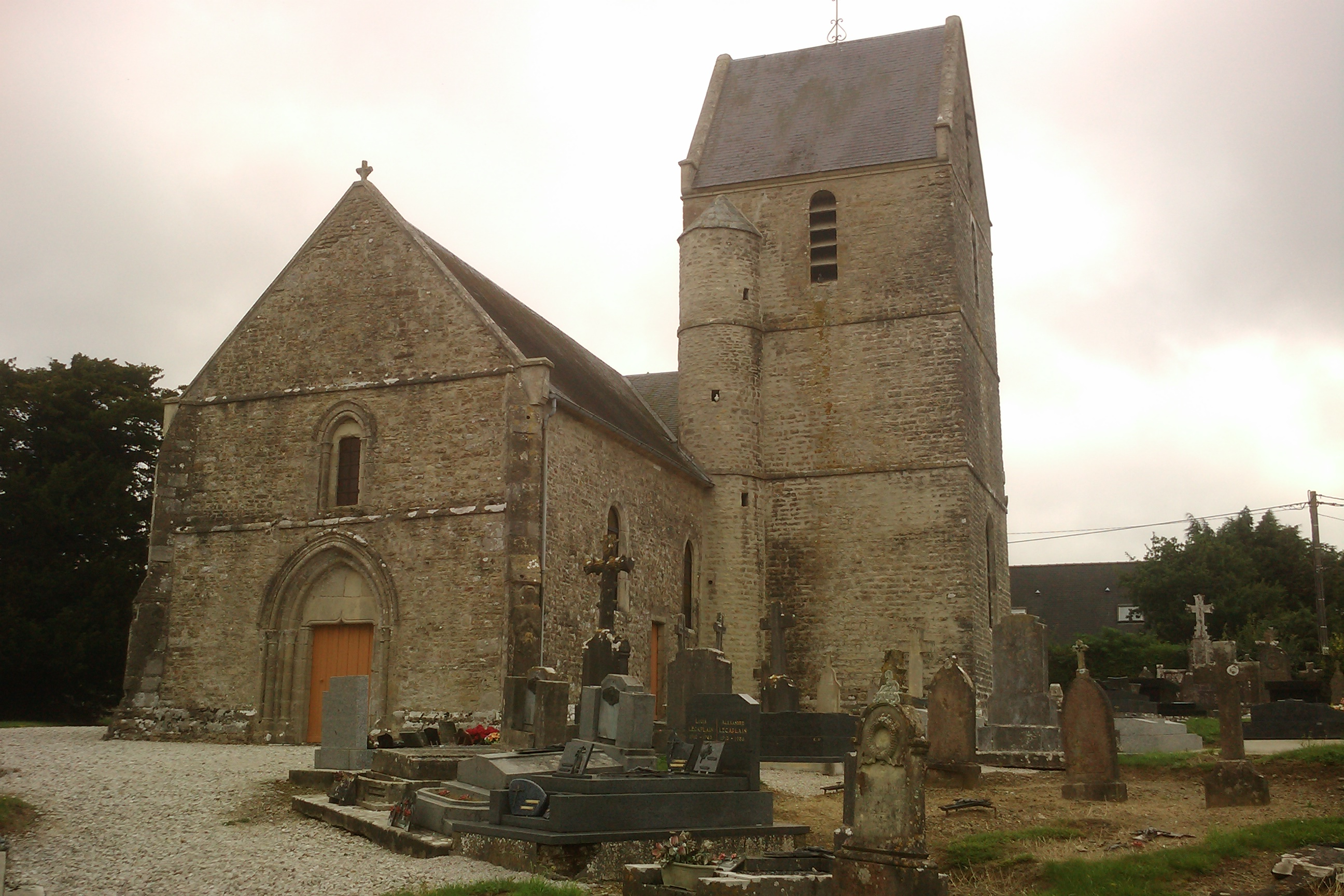
- The church in Joganville
- Location of Joganville
- Location within France Location within Normandy
- Coordinates: 49°28′15″N 1°20′52″W
- Country: France
- Region: Normandy
- Department: Manche
- Arrondissement: Cherbourg
- Canton: Valognes
- Intercommunality: CA Cotentin

Government
  - Mayor (2020–2026): Gilles Schmitt
- Area^{1}: 2.87 km^{2} (1.11 sq mi)
- Elevation: 20 m (66 ft)
- Highest elevation: 34 m (112 ft)
- Lowest elevation: 13 m (43 ft)
- Population (2023): 84
  - Density: 29/km^{2} (76/sq mi)
- Demonym: Joganvillais
- Time zone: UTC+01:00 (CET)
  - Summer (DST): UTC+02:00 (CEST)
- INSEE/Postal code: 50258 /50310
- ^{1} French Land Register data, which excludes lakes, ponds, glaciers > 1 km^{2} (0.386 sq mi or 247 acres) and river estuaries.

Joganville (French pronunciation: [ʒɔɡɑ̃vil]) is a commune in the Manche department in north-western France.

== See also ==
- Communes of the Manche department
