= Sortosville =

- Commune
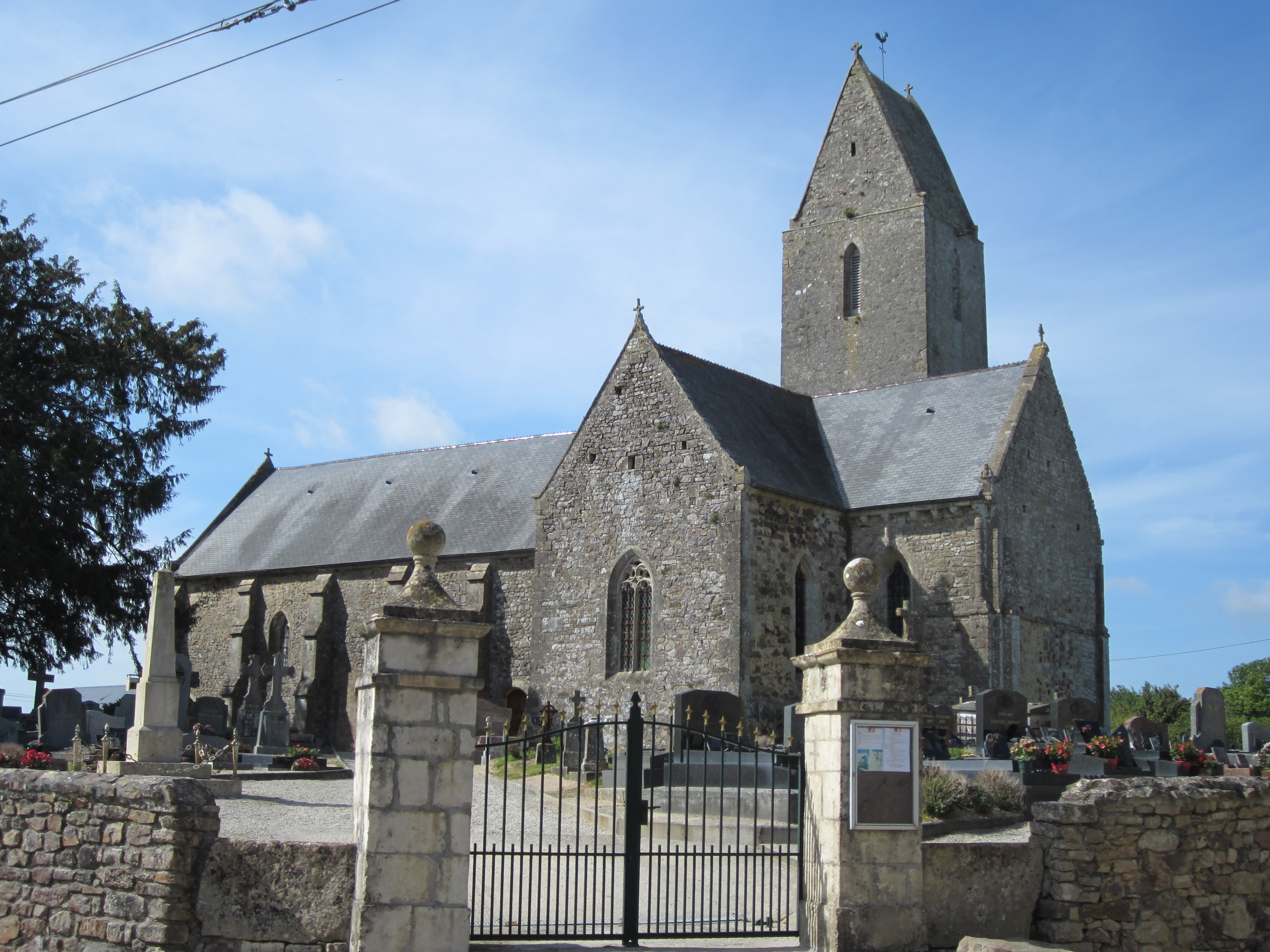
- The church of Notre-Dame
- Location of Sortosville
- Location within France Location within Normandy
- Coordinates: 49°28′49″N 1°25′54″W
- Country: France
- Region: Normandy
- Department: Manche
- Arrondissement: Cherbourg
- Canton: Valognes
- Intercommunality: CA Cotentin

Government
  - Mayor (2020–2026): André Amiot
- Area^{1}: 2.48 km^{2} (0.96 sq mi)
- Elevation: 20 m (66 ft)
- Highest elevation: 53 m (174 ft)
- Lowest elevation: 15 m (49 ft)
- Population (2023): 80
  - Density: 32/km^{2} (84/sq mi)
- Time zone: UTC+01:00 (CET)
  - Summer (DST): UTC+02:00 (CEST)
- INSEE/Postal code: 50578 /50310
- ^{1} French Land Register data, which excludes lakes, ponds, glaciers > 1 km^{2} (0.386 sq mi or 247 acres) and river estuaries.

Sortosville is a commune in the Manche department in Normandy in north-western France.

== See also ==
- Communes of the Manche department
