= Le Ham, Manche =

Le Ham
- Commune
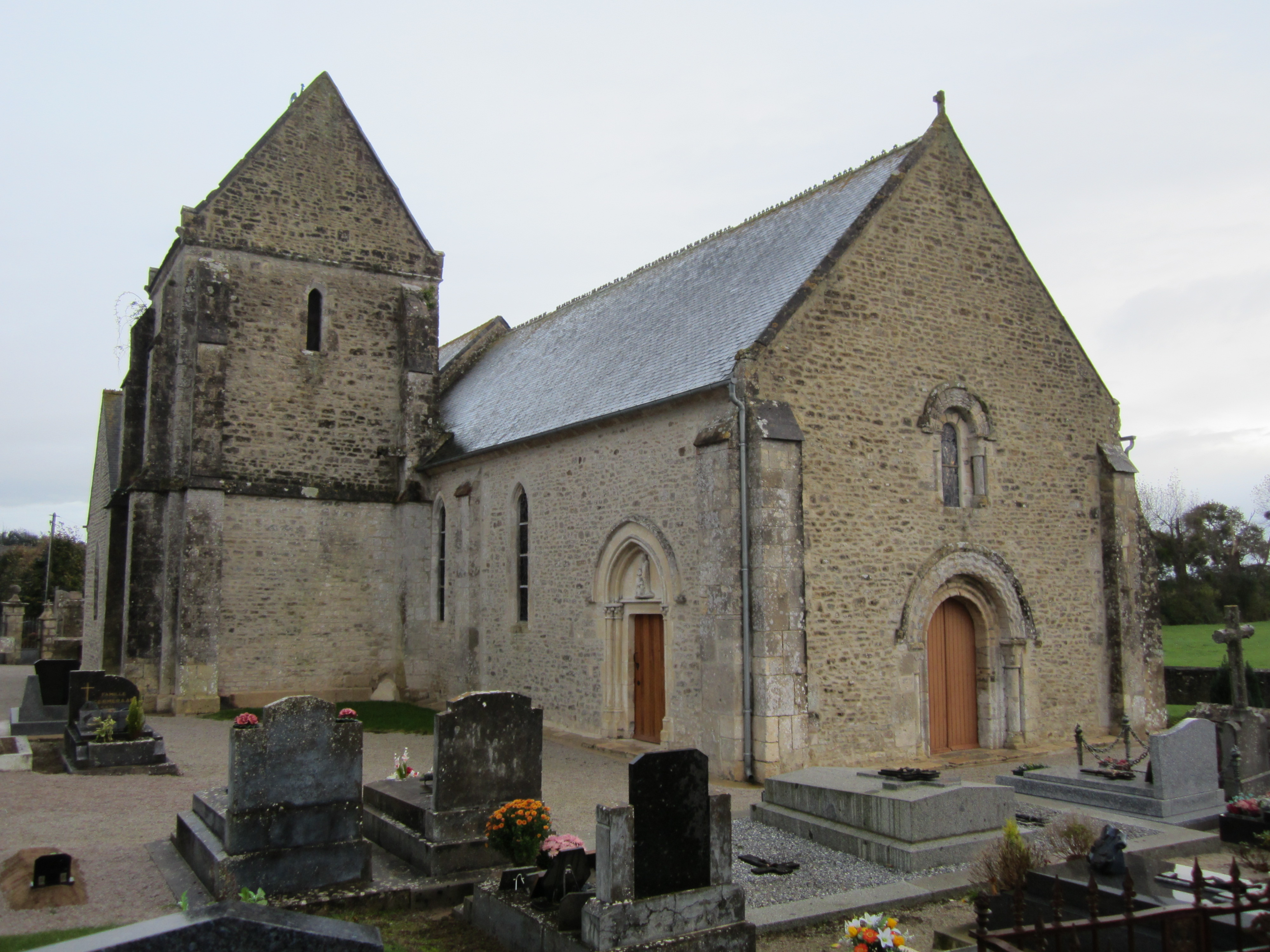
- The church of Saint-Pierre
- Location of Le Ham
- Location within France Location within Normandy
- Coordinates: 49°27′05″N 1°24′58″W
- Country: France
- Region: Normandy
- Department: Manche
- Arrondissement: Cherbourg
- Canton: Valognes
- Intercommunality: CA Cotentin

Government
  - Mayor (2020–2026): Ghislain Dubois
- Area^{1}: 3.86 km^{2} (1.49 sq mi)
- Elevation: 12 m (39 ft)
- Highest elevation: 26 m (85 ft)
- Lowest elevation: 3 m (9.8 ft)
- Population (2023): 309
  - Density: 80.1/km^{2} (207/sq mi)
- Time zone: UTC+01:00 (CET)
  - Summer (DST): UTC+02:00 (CEST)
- INSEE/Postal code: 50227 /50310
- ^{1} French Land Register data, which excludes lakes, ponds, glaciers > 1 km^{2} (0.386 sq mi or 247 acres) and river estuaries.

Le Ham (French pronunciation: [lə am]) is a commune in the Manche department in north-western France.

== See also ==
- Communes of the Manche department
