= Saint-Cyr-Bocage =

- Commune
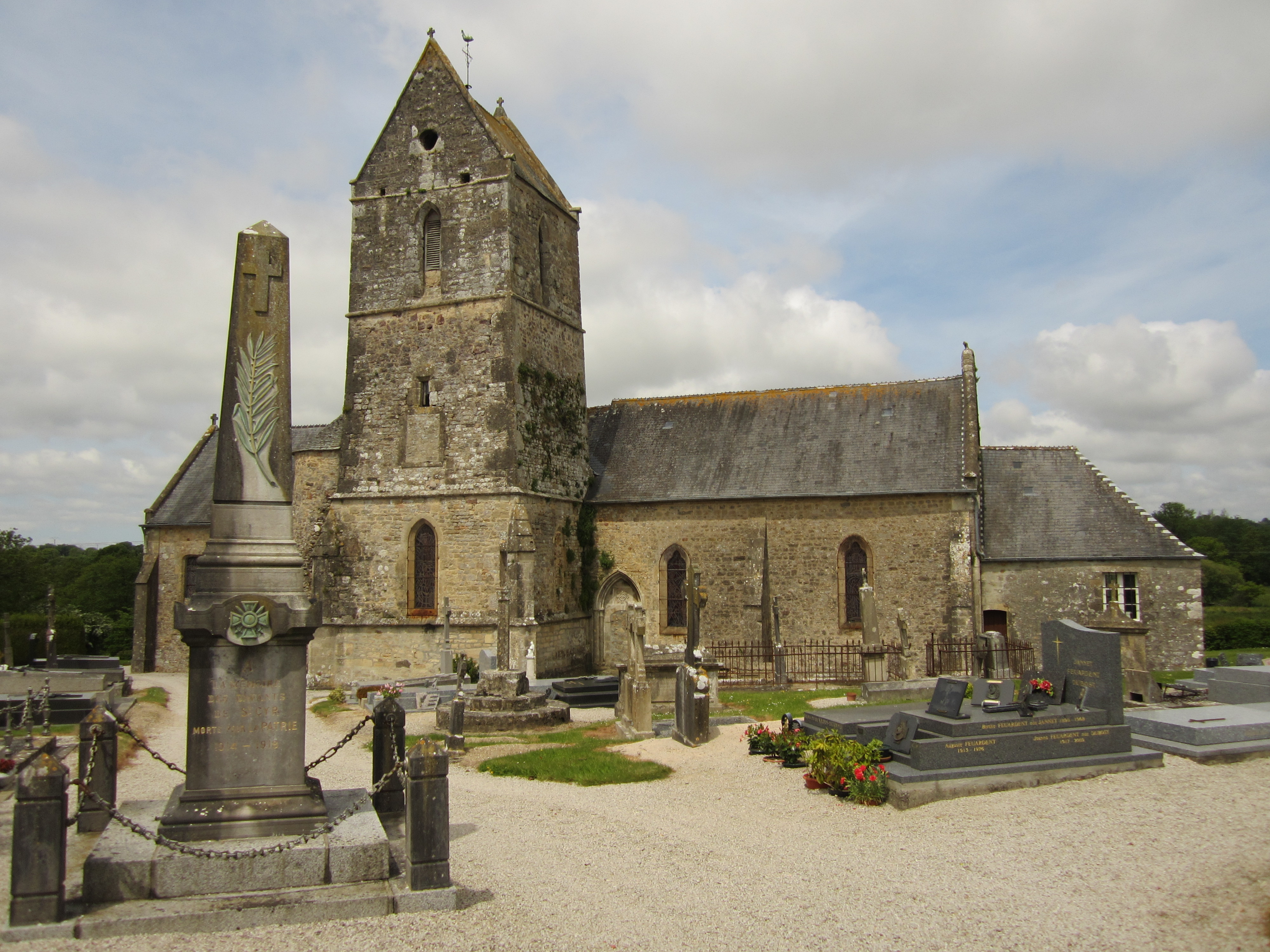
- The church of Saint-Cyr-et-Sainte-Julitte
- Location of Saint-Cyr-Bocage
- Location within France Location within Normandy
- Coordinates: 49°29′20″N 1°25′06″W
- Country: France
- Region: Normandy
- Department: Manche
- Arrondissement: Cherbourg
- Canton: Valognes
- Intercommunality: CA Cotentin

Government
  - Mayor (2020–2026): Christèle Castelein
- Area^{1}: 5.7 km^{2} (2.2 sq mi)
- Elevation: 49 m (161 ft)
- Population (2023): 213
  - Density: 37/km^{2} (97/sq mi)
- Time zone: UTC+01:00 (CET)
  - Summer (DST): UTC+02:00 (CEST)
- INSEE/Postal code: 50461 /50310
- ^{1} French Land Register data, which excludes lakes, ponds, glaciers > 1 km^{2} (0.386 sq mi or 247 acres) and river estuaries.

Saint-Cyr-Bocage (before 2026: Saint-Cyr, French pronunciation: [sɛ̃ siʁ]) is a commune in the Manche department in Normandy in north-western France.

== See also ==
- Communes of the Manche department
