= Saint-Germain-de-Tournebut =

- Commune
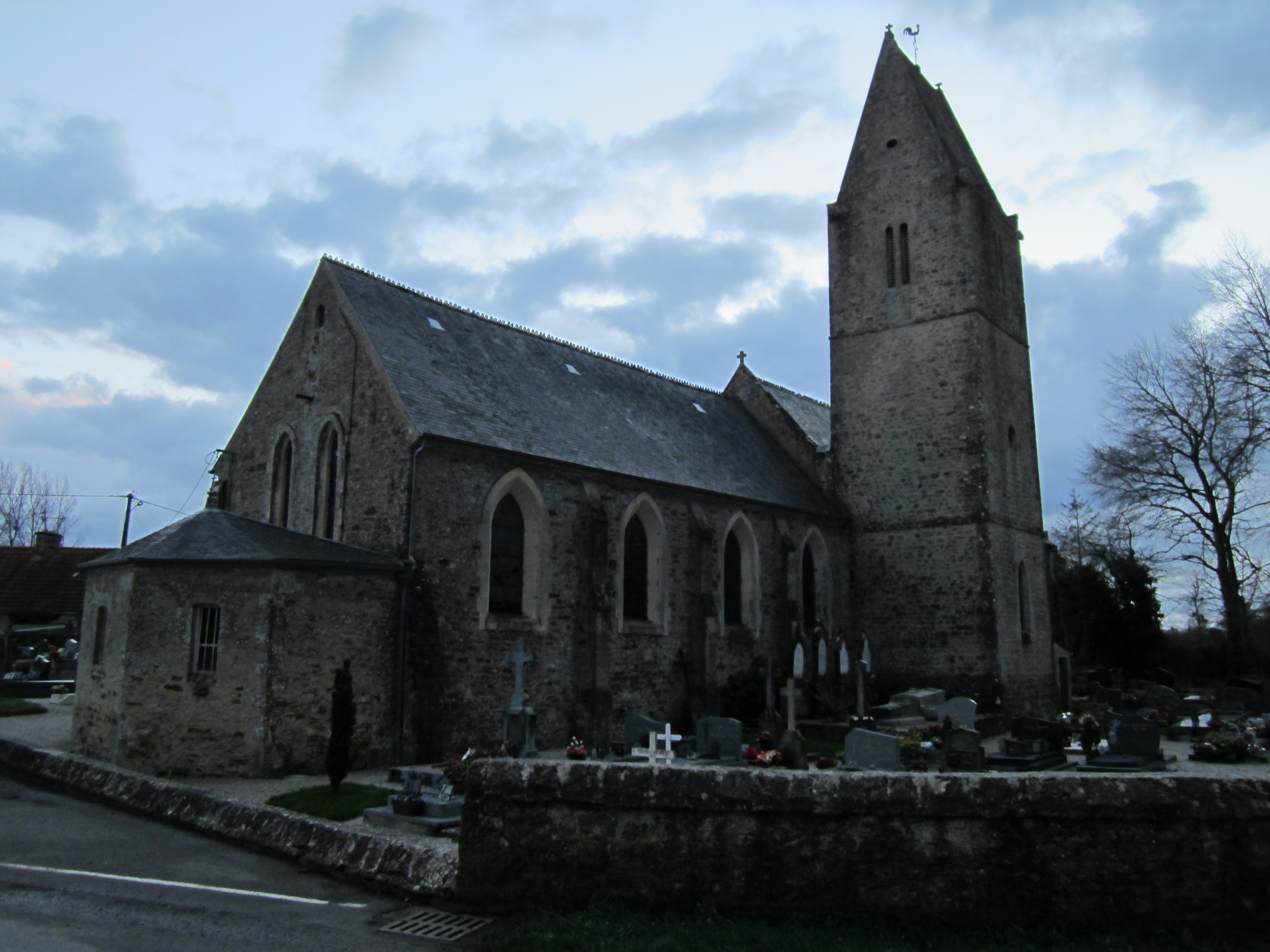
- The church of Saint Germain
- Location of Saint-Germain-de-Tournebut
- Location within France Location within Normandy
- Coordinates: 49°32′00″N 1°23′42″W
- Country: France
- Region: Normandy
- Department: Manche
- Arrondissement: Cherbourg
- Canton: Valognes
- Intercommunality: CA Cotentin

Government
  - Mayor (2020–2026): Hervé Fontaine
- Area^{1}: 13.91 km^{2} (5.37 sq mi)
- Elevation: 60 m (200 ft)
- Population (2023): 418
  - Density: 30.1/km^{2} (77.8/sq mi)
- Time zone: UTC+01:00 (CET)
  - Summer (DST): UTC+02:00 (CEST)
- INSEE/Postal code: 50478 /50700
- ^{1} French Land Register data, which excludes lakes, ponds, glaciers > 1 km^{2} (0.386 sq mi or 247 acres) and river estuaries.

Saint-Germain-de-Tournebut (French pronunciation: [sɛ̃ ʒɛʁmɛ̃ də tuʁnəby]) is a commune in the Manche department of Normandy in north-western France.

== See also ==
- Communes of the Manche department
