= Saint-Joseph, Manche =

Saint-Joseph
- Commune
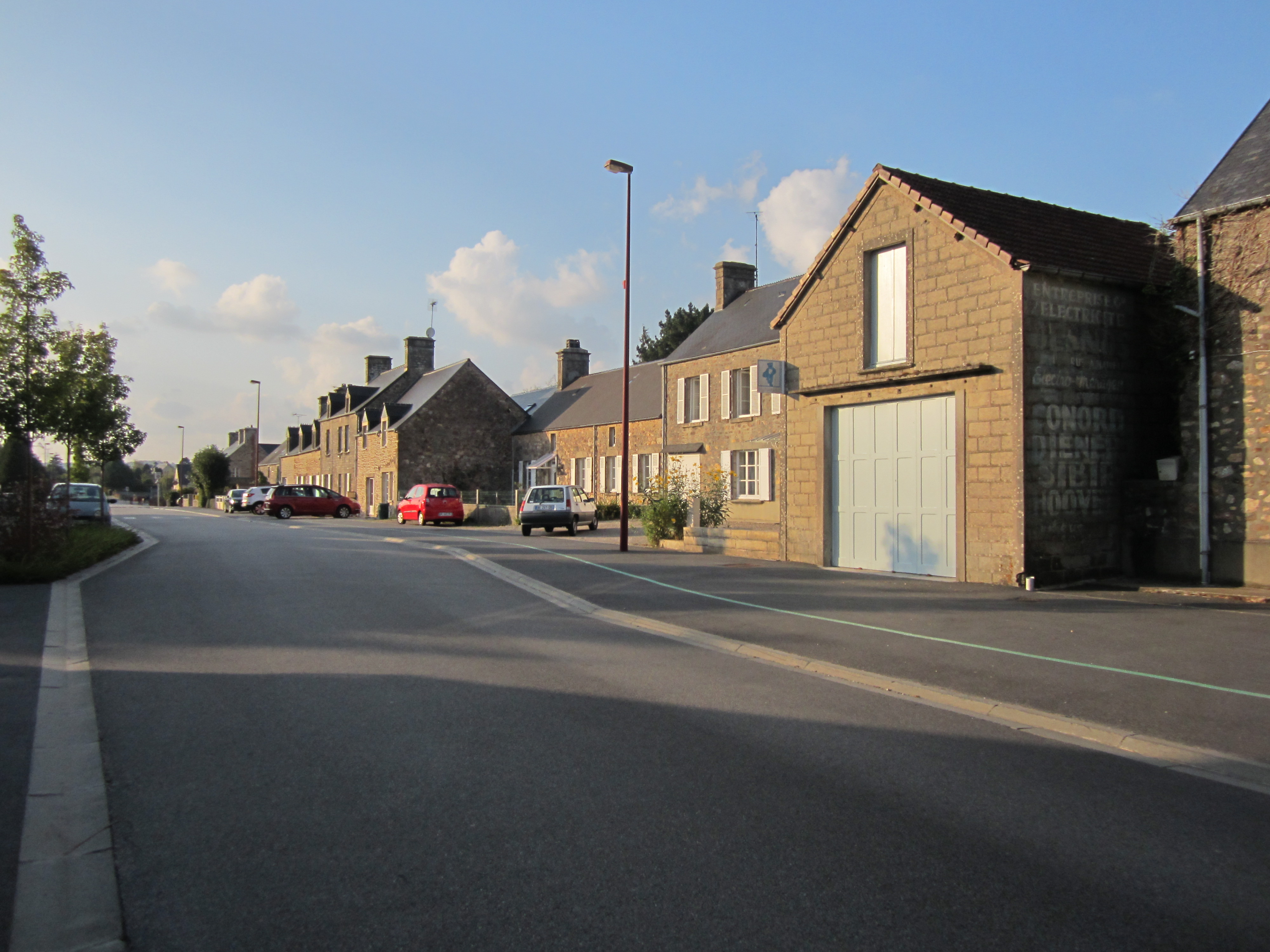
- The main street
- Location of Saint-Joseph
- Location within France Location within Normandy
- Coordinates: 49°32′00″N 1°31′31″W
- Country: France
- Region: Normandy
- Department: Manche
- Arrondissement: Cherbourg
- Canton: Valognes
- Intercommunality: CA Cotentin

Government
  - Mayor (2020–2026): Jean-Marie Mouchel
- Area^{1}: 9.78 km^{2} (3.78 sq mi)
- Elevation: 97 m (318 ft)
- Highest elevation: 122 m (400 ft)
- Lowest elevation: 32 m (105 ft)
- Population (2023): 822
  - Density: 84.0/km^{2} (218/sq mi)
- Time zone: UTC+01:00 (CET)
  - Summer (DST): UTC+02:00 (CEST)
- INSEE/Postal code: 50498 /50700
- ^{1} French Land Register data, which excludes lakes, ponds, glaciers > 1 km^{2} (0.386 sq mi or 247 acres) and river estuaries.

Saint-Joseph (French pronunciation: [sɛ̃ ʒozɛf]) is a commune in the Manche department in Normandy in north-western France.

== See also ==
- Communes of the Manche department
