= Ozeville =

- Commune
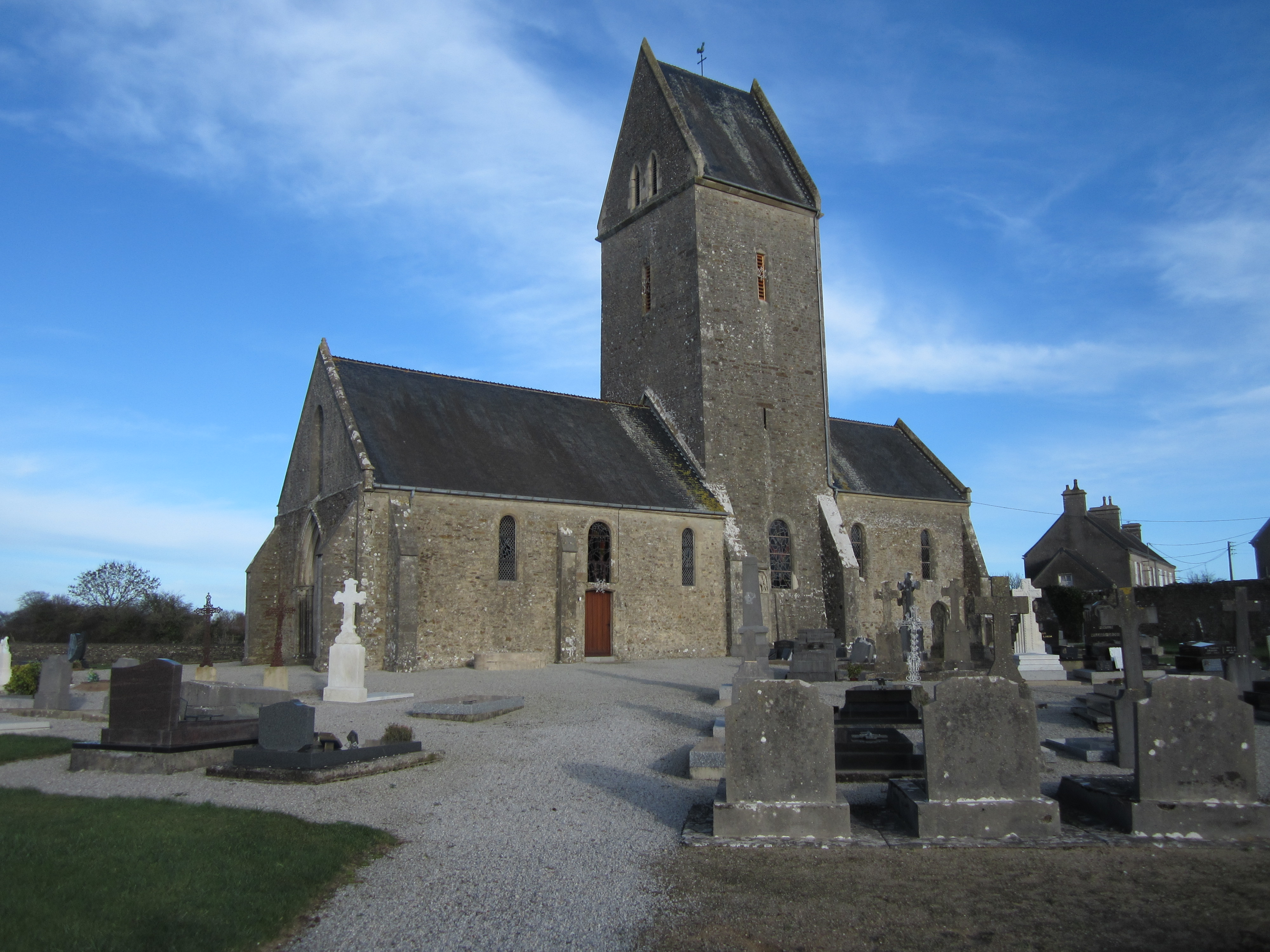
- The church of Saint-Martin
- Location of Ozeville
- Location within France Location within Normandy
- Coordinates: 49°30′10″N 1°20′17″W
- Country: France
- Region: Normandy
- Department: Manche
- Arrondissement: Cherbourg
- Canton: Valognes
- Intercommunality: CA Cotentin

Government
  - Mayor (2020–2026): Jean-Louis Cauvin
- Area^{1}: 4.70 km^{2} (1.81 sq mi)
- Elevation: 35 m (115 ft)
- Highest elevation: 72 m (236 ft)
- Lowest elevation: 20 m (66 ft)
- Population (2023): 159
  - Density: 33.8/km^{2} (87.6/sq mi)
- Demonym: Ozevillais
- Time zone: UTC+01:00 (CET)
  - Summer (DST): UTC+02:00 (CEST)
- INSEE/Postal code: 50390 /50310
- ^{1} French Land Register data, which excludes lakes, ponds, glaciers > 1 km^{2} (0.386 sq mi or 247 acres) and river estuaries.

Ozeville (French pronunciation: [ozvil]) is a commune in the Manche department in Normandy in north-western France.

The town was mentioned in the D-Day diary of Capt Walter Marchand, US Army, Medical Corps. Ozeville was assaulted on 8 June (D-Day+2) and finally taken on 13 June (D-Day+7) by the Allied Forces.

== See also ==
- Communes of the Manche department
