= Huberville =

- Commune
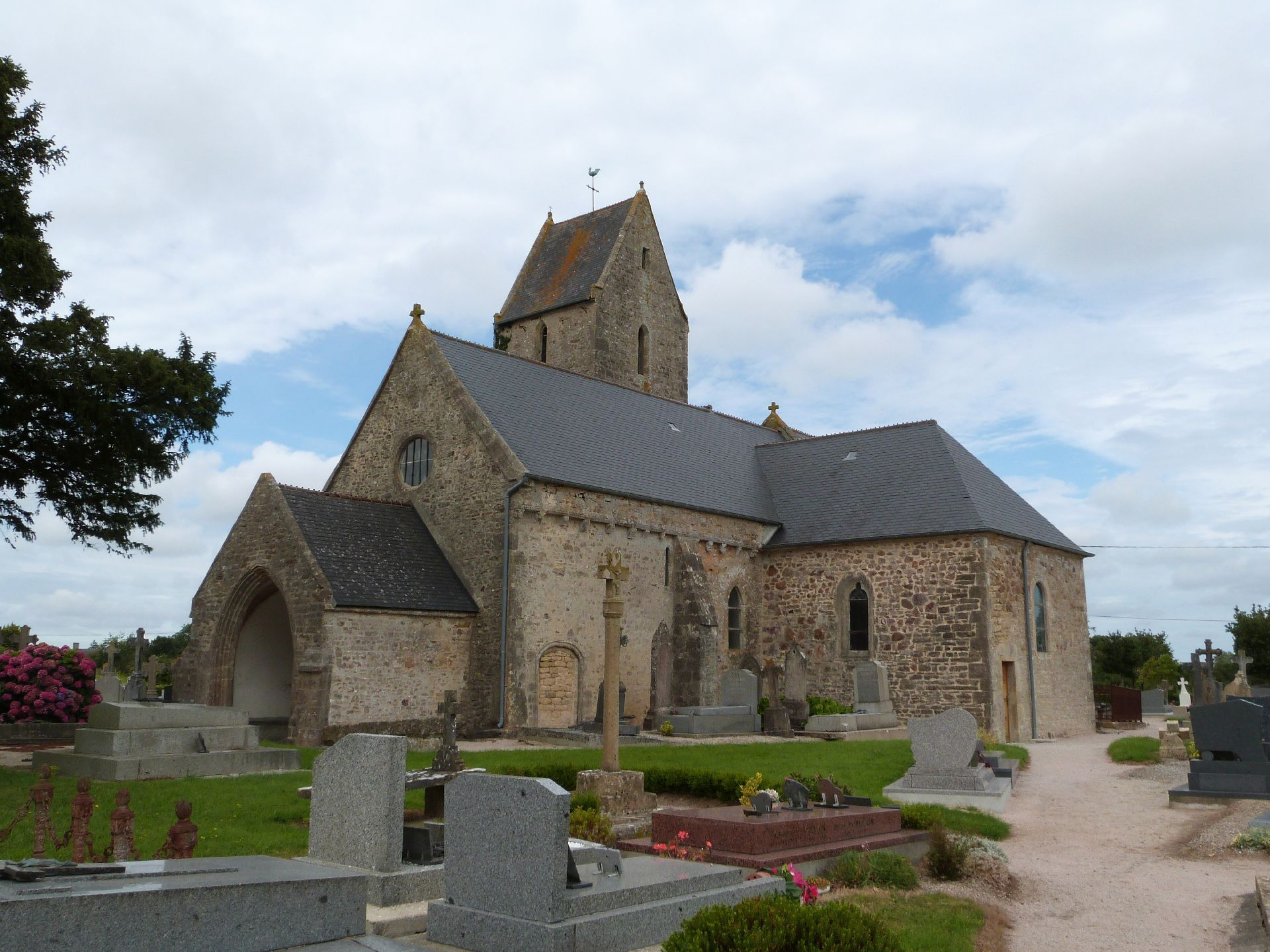
- The church of Saint-Pierre-ès-Liens

- Coat of arms
- Location of Huberville
- Location within France Location within Normandy
- Coordinates: 49°30′39″N 1°26′11″W
- Country: France
- Region: Normandy
- Department: Manche
- Arrondissement: Cherbourg
- Canton: Valognes
- Intercommunality: CA Cotentin

Government
  - Mayor (2020–2026): Jean-Marie Renard
- Area^{1}: 5.76 km^{2} (2.22 sq mi)
- Elevation: 50 m (160 ft)
- Highest elevation: 118 m (387 ft)
- Lowest elevation: 29 m (95 ft)
- Population (2023): 361
  - Density: 62.7/km^{2} (162/sq mi)
- Time zone: UTC+01:00 (CET)
  - Summer (DST): UTC+02:00 (CEST)
- INSEE/Postal code: 50251 /50700
- ^{1} French Land Register data, which excludes lakes, ponds, glaciers > 1 km^{2} (0.386 sq mi or 247 acres) and river estuaries.

Huberville is a commune in the Manche department in north-western France.

== See also ==
- Communes of the Manche department
