= Saussemesnil =

- Commune
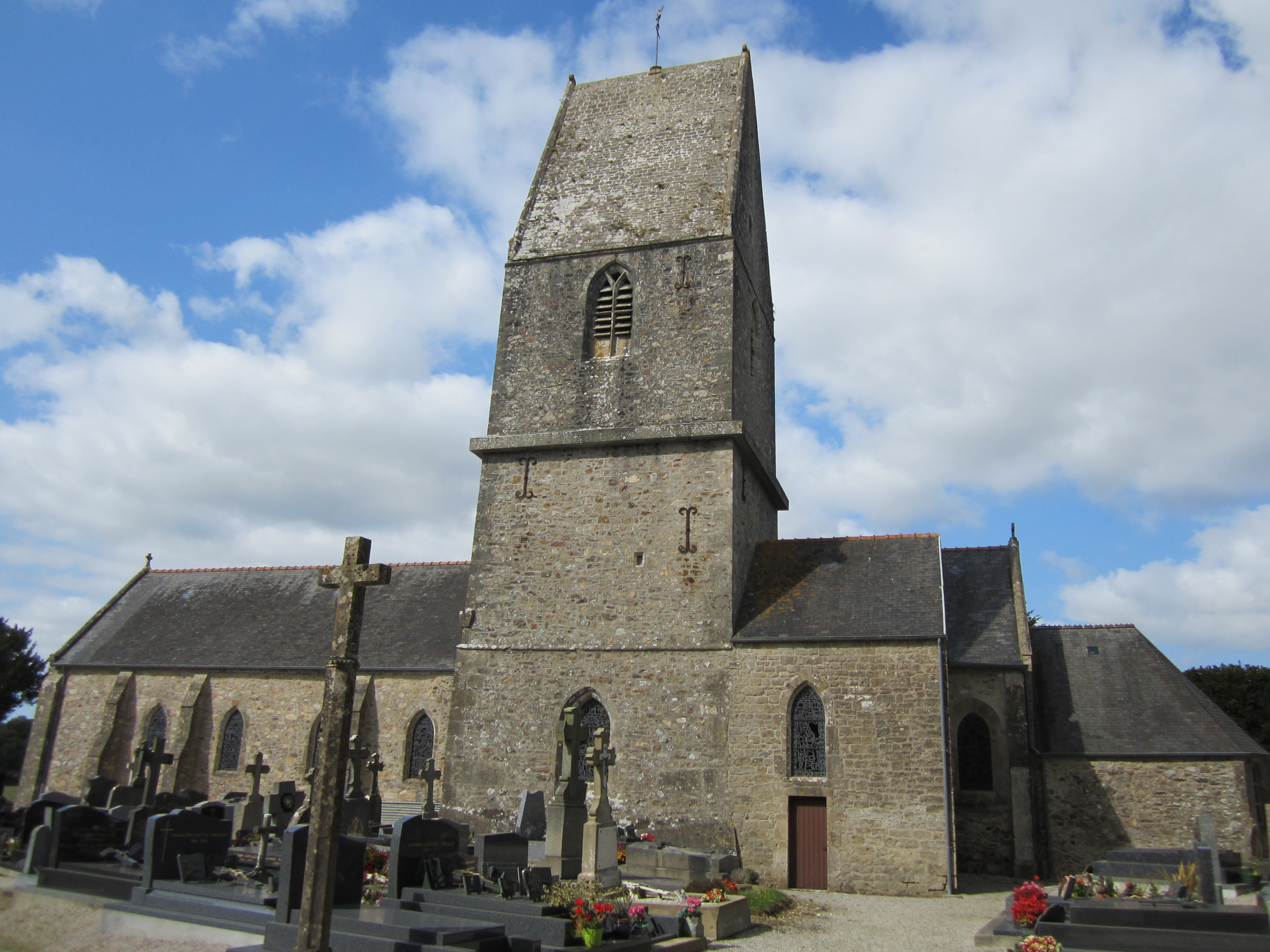
- The church of Saint-Grégoire

- Coat of arms
- Location of Saussemesnil
- Location within France Location within Normandy
- Coordinates: 49°34′15″N 1°28′57″W
- Country: France
- Region: Normandy
- Department: Manche
- Arrondissement: Cherbourg
- Canton: Valognes
- Intercommunality: CA Cotentin

Government
  - Mayor (2020–2026): Jean-Marie Dorey
- Area^{1}: 21.45 km^{2} (8.28 sq mi)
- Highest elevation: 175 m (574 ft)
- Lowest elevation: 60 m (200 ft)
- Population (2023): 927
  - Density: 43.2/km^{2} (112/sq mi)
- Time zone: UTC+01:00 (CET)
  - Summer (DST): UTC+02:00 (CEST)
- INSEE/Postal code: 50567 /50700
- Website: www.sauxemesnil.fr
- ^{1} French Land Register data, which excludes lakes, ponds, glaciers > 1 km^{2} (0.386 sq mi or 247 acres) and river estuaries.

Saussemesnil (French pronunciation: [sosmenil]) or Sauxemesnil or Sauxemesnil-Ruffosses is a commune in the Manche department in Normandy in north-western France.

== Heraldry ==
Arms of Saussemesnil	The arms of Saussemesnil are blazoned : Per bend sinister 1: Azure, a one handled pot proper and a capital letter S gules; 2: vert, 2 poplar trees eradicated proper, and to dexter the capital letter R gules, and a base azure; overall a bend sinister gules.

== See also ==
- Communes of the Manche department
