= La Haye-Pesnel =

- Commune
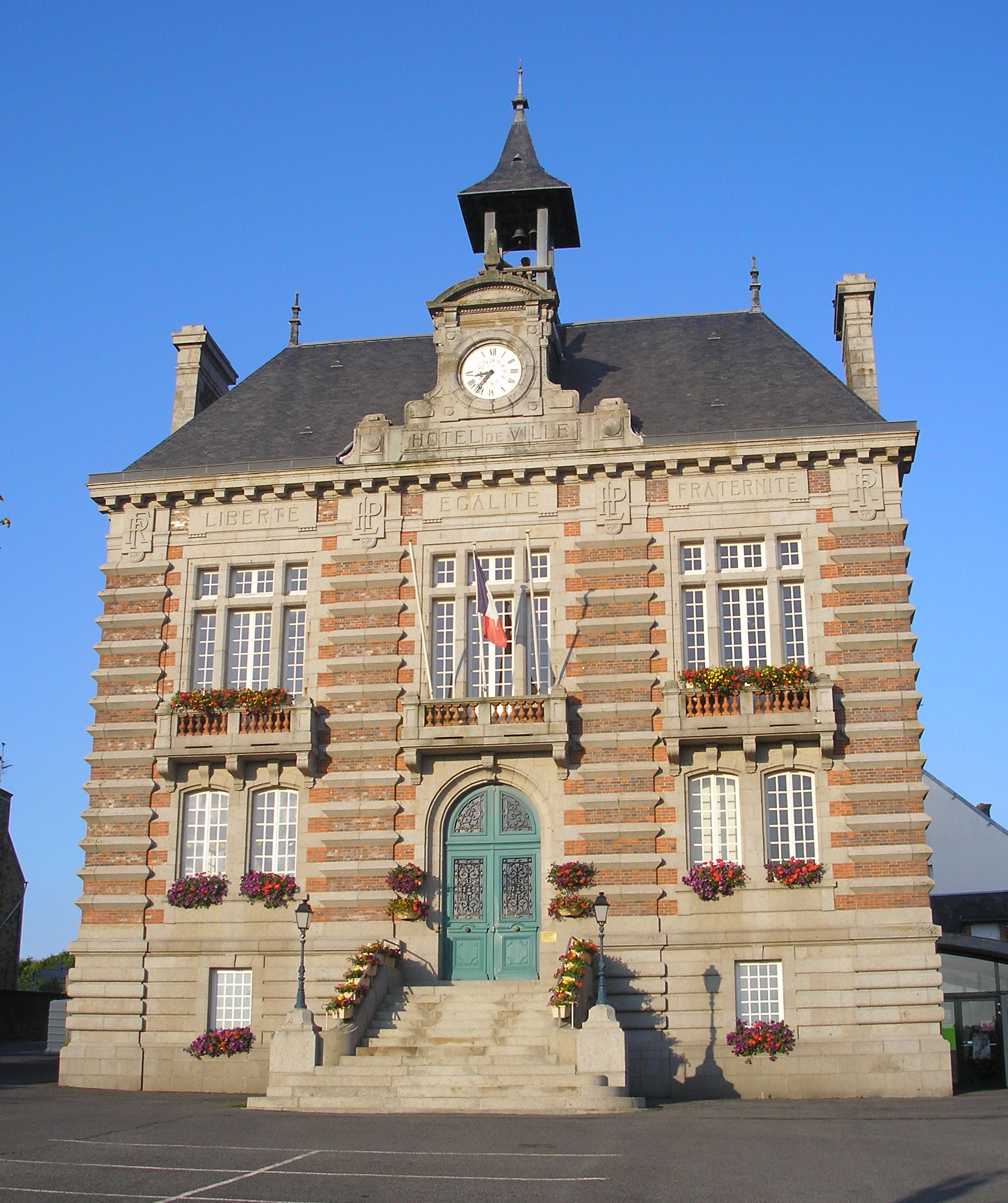
- The town hall in La Haye-Pesnel

- Coat of arms
- Location of La Haye-Pesnel
- Location within France Location within Normandy
- Coordinates: 48°47′47″N 1°23′44″W
- Country: France
- Region: Normandy
- Department: Manche
- Arrondissement: Avranches
- Canton: Bréhal
- Intercommunality: Granville, Terre et Mer

Government
  - Mayor (2020–2026): Alain Navarret
- Area^{1}: 6.29 km^{2} (2.43 sq mi)
- Elevation: 89 m (292 ft)
- Highest elevation: 134 m (440 ft)
- Lowest elevation: 62 m (203 ft)
- Population (2023): 1,302
  - Density: 207/km^{2} (536/sq mi)
- Time zone: UTC+01:00 (CET)
  - Summer (DST): UTC+02:00 (CEST)
- INSEE/Postal code: 50237 /50320
- ^{1} French Land Register data, which excludes lakes, ponds, glaciers > 1 km^{2} (0.386 sq mi or 247 acres) and river estuaries.

La Haye-Pesnel (French pronunciation: [la ɛ pɛnɛl]) is a commune in the Manche department in Normandy in north-western France.

== Heraldry ==
| Arms of La Haye-Pesnel | The arms of La Haye-Pesnel are blazoned : Or, 2 fesses azure, between 9 martlets in orle gules. |

== See also ==
- Communes of the Manche department
