= Saint-Martin-d'Audouville =

- Commune
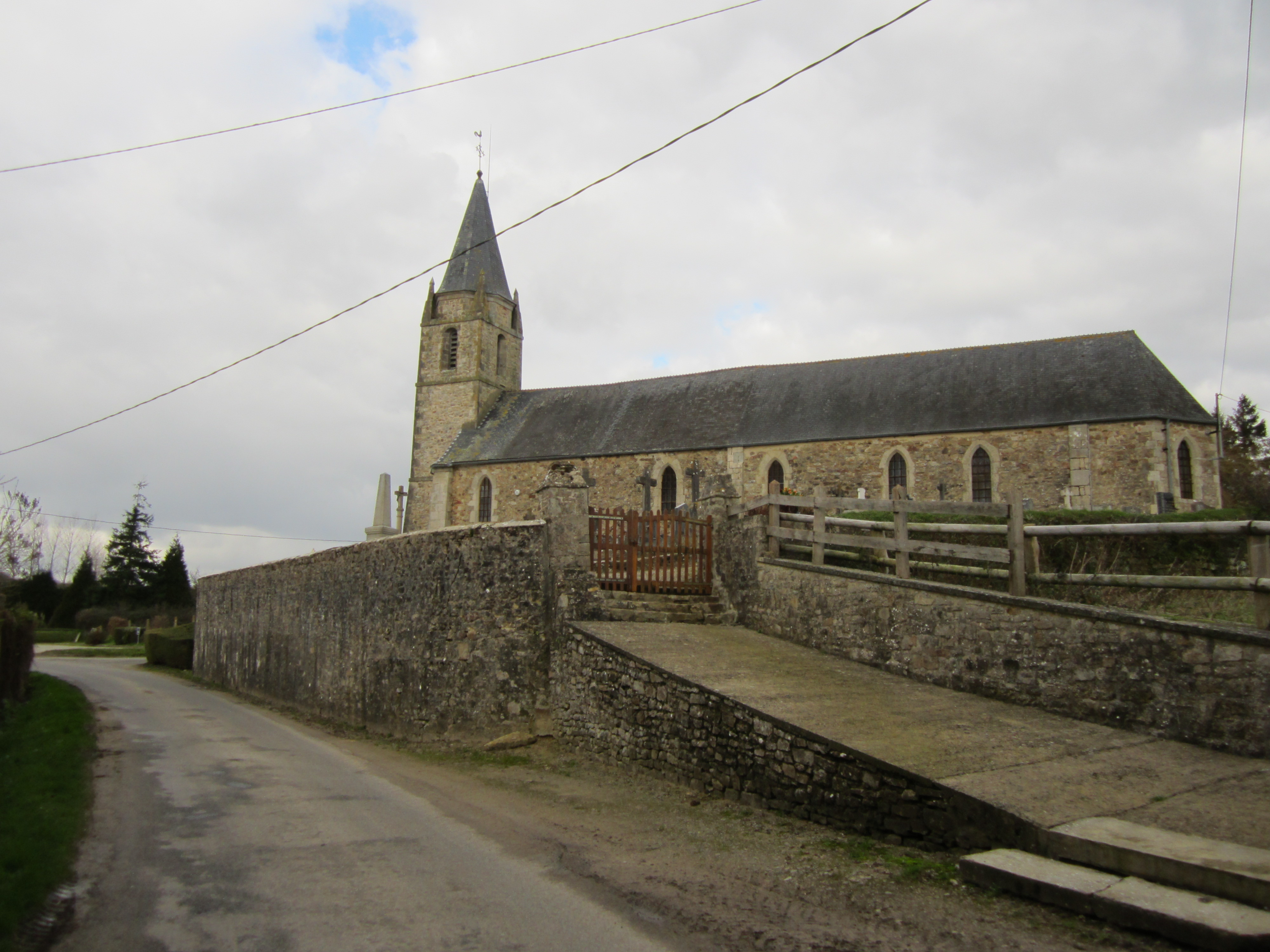
- The church of Notre-Dame

- Coat of arms
- Location of Saint-Martin-d'Audouville
- Location within France Location within Normandy
- Coordinates: 49°31′46″N 1°21′39″W
- Country: France
- Region: Normandy
- Department: Manche
- Arrondissement: Cherbourg
- Canton: Valognes
- Intercommunality: CA Cotentin

Government
  - Mayor (2020–2026): Colette Lequertier
- Area^{1}: 3.64 km^{2} (1.41 sq mi)
- Elevation: 10 m (33 ft)
- Population (2023): 158
  - Density: 43.4/km^{2} (112/sq mi)
- Time zone: UTC+01:00 (CET)
  - Summer (DST): UTC+02:00 (CEST)
- INSEE/Postal code: 50511 /50310
- ^{1} French Land Register data, which excludes lakes, ponds, glaciers > 1 km^{2} (0.386 sq mi or 247 acres) and river estuaries.

Saint-Martin-d'Audouville (French pronunciation: [sɛ̃ maʁtɛ̃ doduvil]) is a commune in the Manche department in Normandy in north-western France.

== See also ==
- Communes of the Manche department
