= Yvetot-Bocage =

- Commune
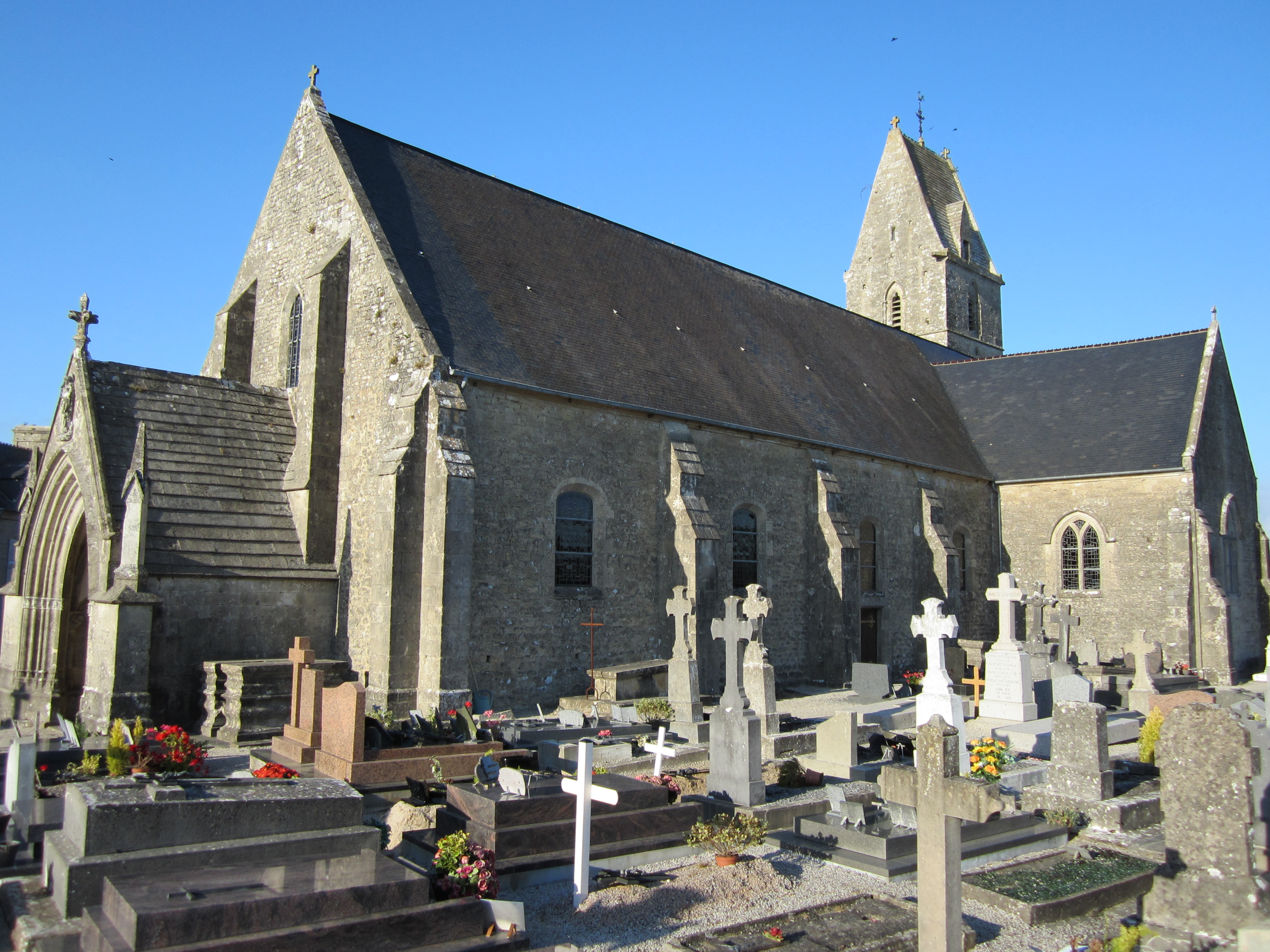
- The church of Saint-Georges
- Location of Yvetot-Bocage
- Location within France Location within Normandy
- Coordinates: 49°29′27″N 1°30′09″W
- Country: France
- Region: Normandy
- Department: Manche
- Arrondissement: Cherbourg
- Canton: Valognes
- Intercommunality: Cotentin

Government
  - Mayor (2020–2026): Alain Croizer
- Area^{1}: 12.46 km^{2} (4.81 sq mi)
- Elevation: 39 m (128 ft)
- Highest elevation: 75 m (246 ft)
- Lowest elevation: 13 m (43 ft)
- Population (2023): 1,212
  - Density: 97.27/km^{2} (251.9/sq mi)
- Time zone: UTC+01:00 (CET)
  - Summer (DST): UTC+02:00 (CEST)
- INSEE/Postal code: 50648 /50700
- ^{1} French Land Register data, which excludes lakes, ponds, glaciers > 1 km^{2} (0.386 sq mi or 247 acres) and river estuaries.

Yvetot-Bocage (French pronunciation: [ivto bɔkaʒ]) is a commune in the Manche department in Normandy in north-western France.

== Population ==
Historical population
Year	Pop.	±% p.a.
1968	770	—
1975	771	+0.02%
1982	795	+0.44%
1990	1,044	+3.46%
1999	1,027	−0.18%
2007	1,042	+0.18%
2012	1,139	+1.80%
2017	1,145	+0.11%
2023	1,212	+0.95%
Source: INSEE

== See also ==
- Communes of the Manche department
