= Quinéville =

- Commune
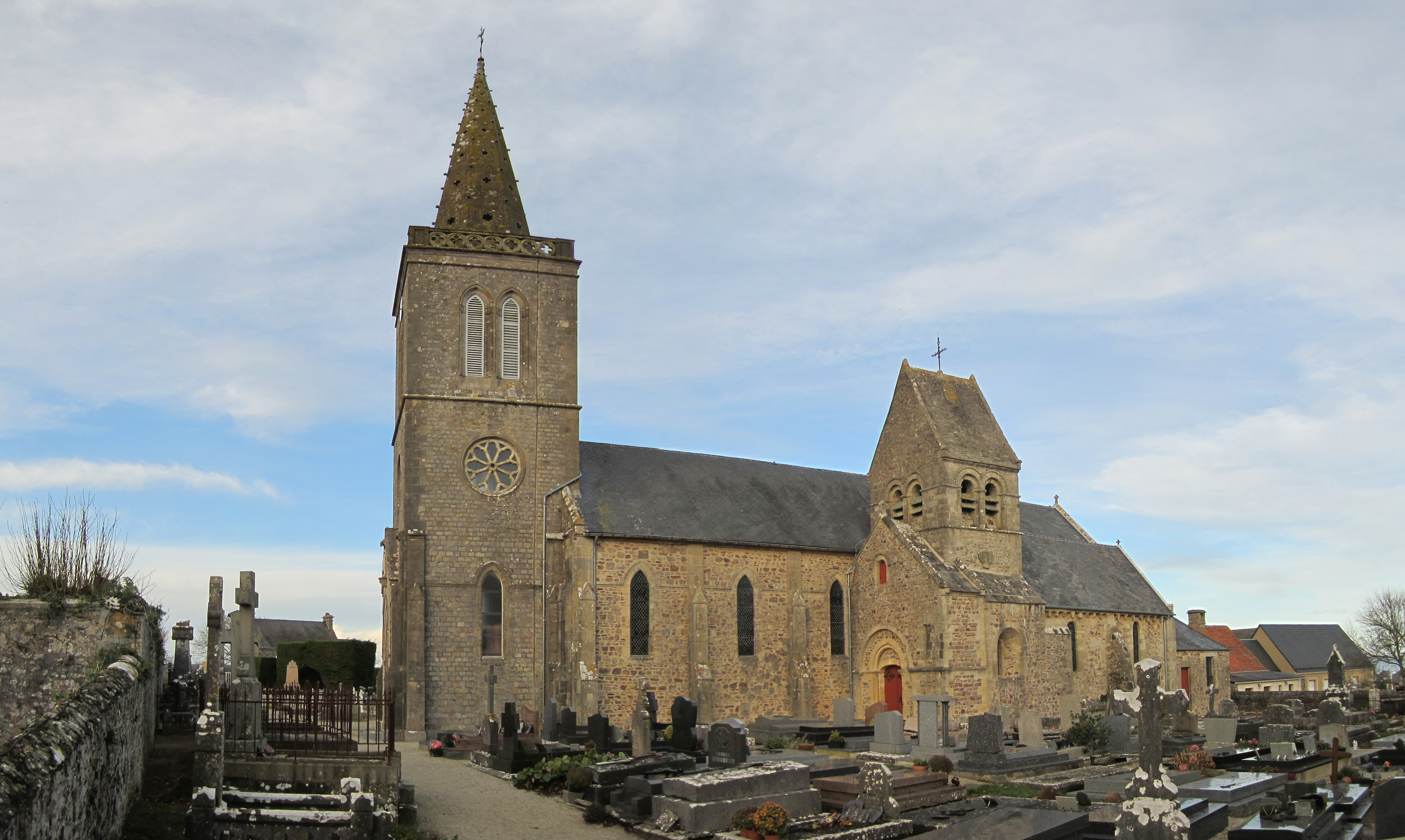
- The church of Notre-Dame and its two bell towers
- Location of Quinéville
- Location within France Location within Normandy
- Coordinates: 49°30′46″N 1°17′46″W
- Country: France
- Region: Normandy
- Department: Manche
- Arrondissement: Cherbourg
- Canton: Valognes
- Intercommunality: CA Cotentin

Government
  - Mayor (2020–2026): René Hardy
- Area^{1}: 4.60 km^{2} (1.78 sq mi)
- Elevation: 30 m (98 ft)
- Highest elevation: 67 m (220 ft)
- Lowest elevation: 1 m (3.3 ft)
- Population (2023): 258
  - Density: 56.1/km^{2} (145/sq mi)
- Time zone: UTC+01:00 (CET)
  - Summer (DST): UTC+02:00 (CEST)
- INSEE/Postal code: 50421 /50310
- ^{1} French Land Register data, which excludes lakes, ponds, glaciers > 1 km^{2} (0.386 sq mi or 247 acres) and river estuaries.

Quinéville is a commune in the Manche department in north-western France.

The Chateau de Quineville is in the village, along with a church, the eglise Notre-Dame.

== See also ==
- Communes of the Manche department
