= Flottemanville =

- Commune
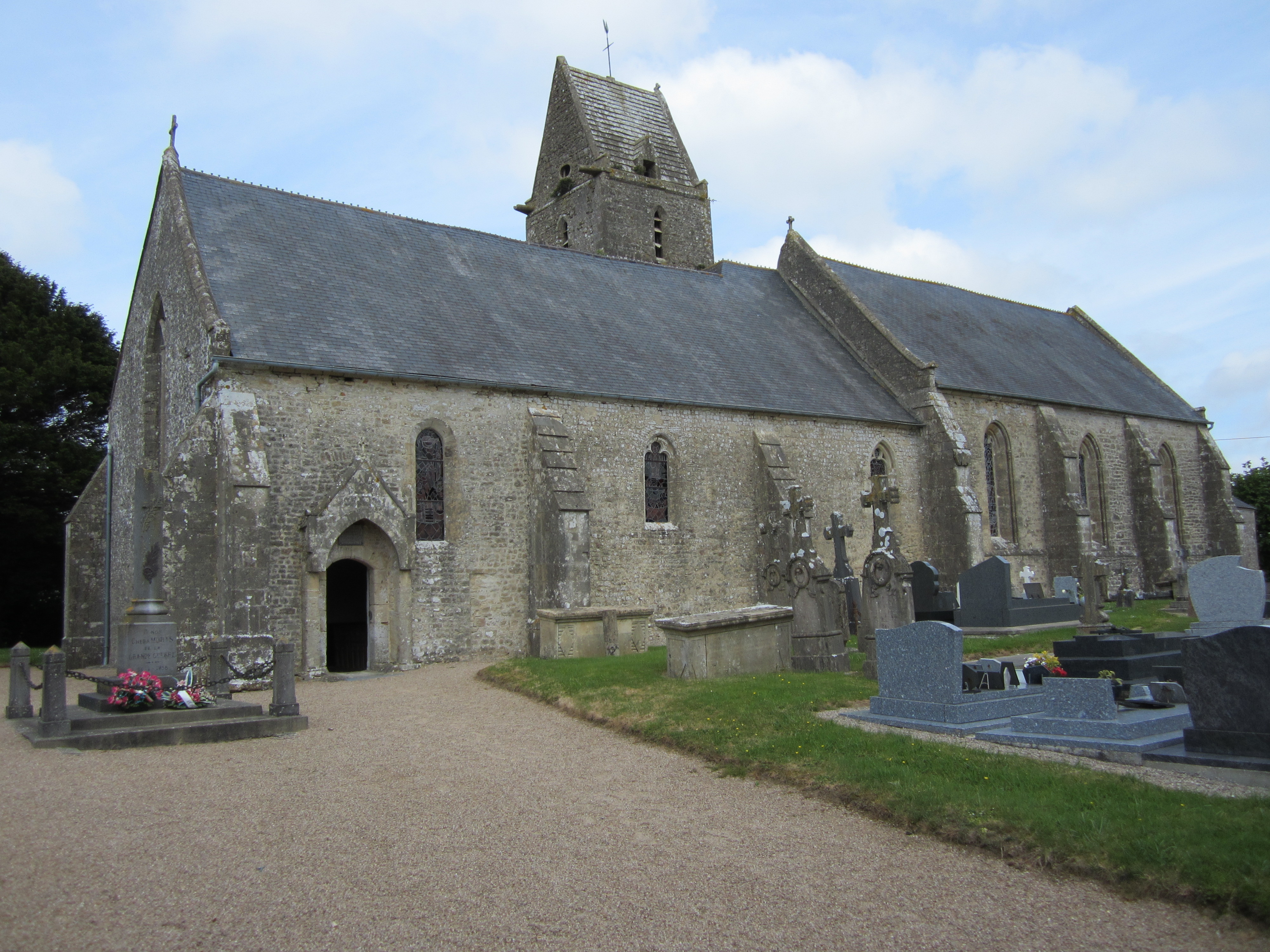
- The church of Saint-Clément
- Location of Flottemanville
- Location within France Location within Normandy
- Coordinates: 49°28′30″N 1°27′14″W
- Country: France
- Region: Normandy
- Department: Manche
- Arrondissement: Cherbourg
- Canton: Valognes
- Intercommunality: CA Cotentin

Government
  - Mayor (2020–2026): Hubert Lemonnier
- Area^{1}: 4.85 km^{2} (1.87 sq mi)
- Elevation: 50 m (160 ft)
- Highest elevation: 43 m (141 ft)
- Lowest elevation: 7 m (23 ft)
- Population (2023): 230
  - Density: 47/km^{2} (120/sq mi)
- Time zone: UTC+01:00 (CET)
  - Summer (DST): UTC+02:00 (CEST)
- INSEE/Postal code: 50186 /50700
- ^{1} French Land Register data, which excludes lakes, ponds, glaciers > 1 km^{2} (0.386 sq mi or 247 acres) and river estuaries.

Flottemanville (French pronunciation: [flɔtmɑ̃vil]) is a commune in the Manche department in north-western France.

== See also ==
- Communes of the Manche department
