= Lieusaint, Manche =

Lieusaint
- Commune
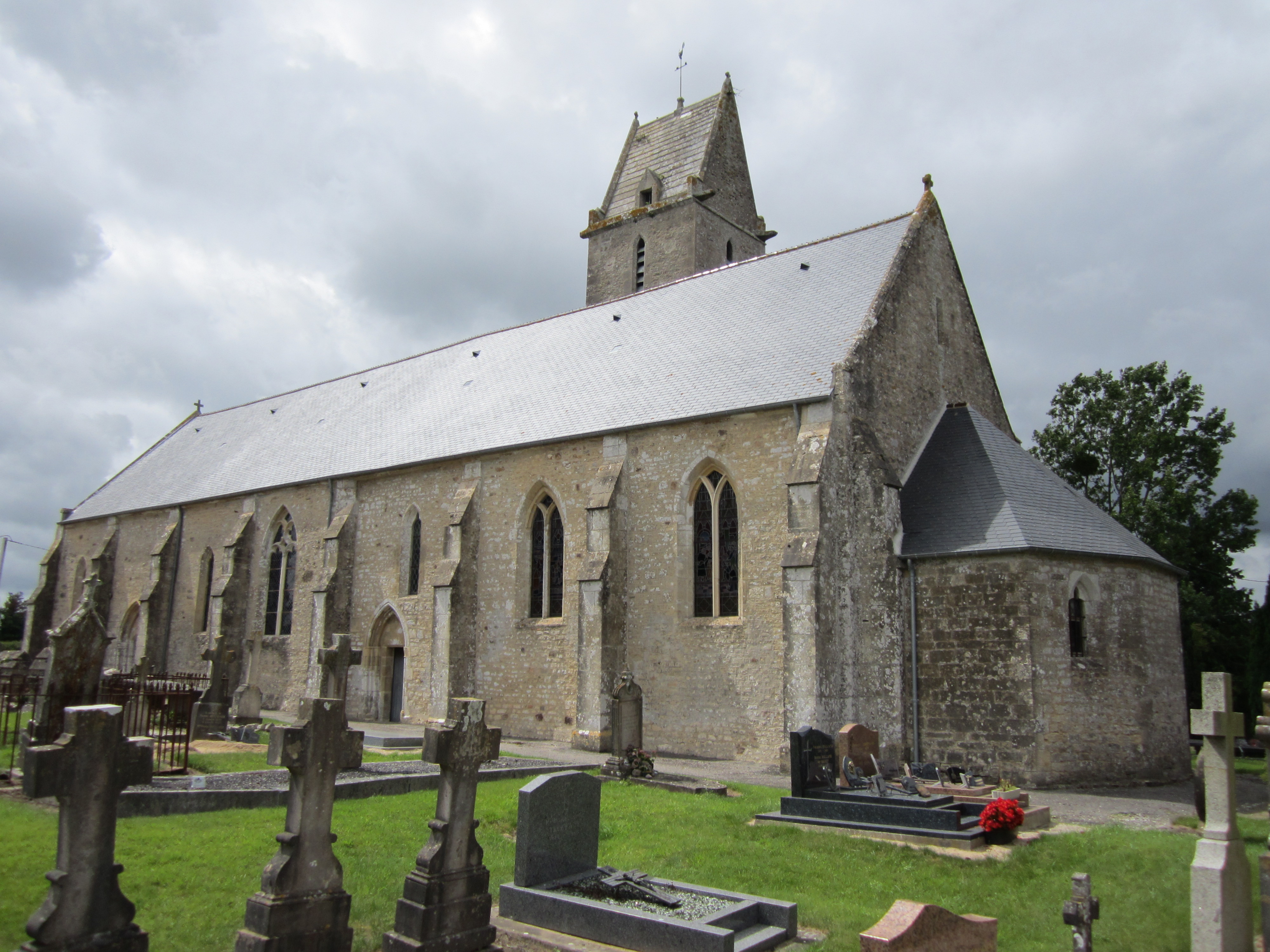
- The church of Saint-Éloi
- Location of Lieusaint
- Location within France Location within Normandy
- Coordinates: 49°28′32″N 1°28′36″W
- Country: France
- Region: Normandy
- Department: Manche
- Arrondissement: Cherbourg
- Canton: Valognes
- Intercommunality: CA Cotentin

Government
  - Mayor (2020–2026): Jean-Paul Lemoigne
- Area^{1}: 5.22 km^{2} (2.02 sq mi)
- Elevation: 20 m (66 ft)
- Highest elevation: 44 m (144 ft)
- Lowest elevation: 9 m (30 ft)
- Population (2023): 408
  - Density: 78.2/km^{2} (202/sq mi)
- Time zone: UTC+01:00 (CET)
  - Summer (DST): UTC+02:00 (CEST)
- INSEE/Postal code: 50270 /50700
- ^{1} French Land Register data, which excludes lakes, ponds, glaciers > 1 km^{2} (0.386 sq mi or 247 acres) and river estuaries.

Lieusaint (French pronunciation: [ljøsɛ̃]) is a commune in the Manche department in Normandy in north-western France.

== See also ==
- Communes of the Manche department
