= Le Rozel =

- Commune
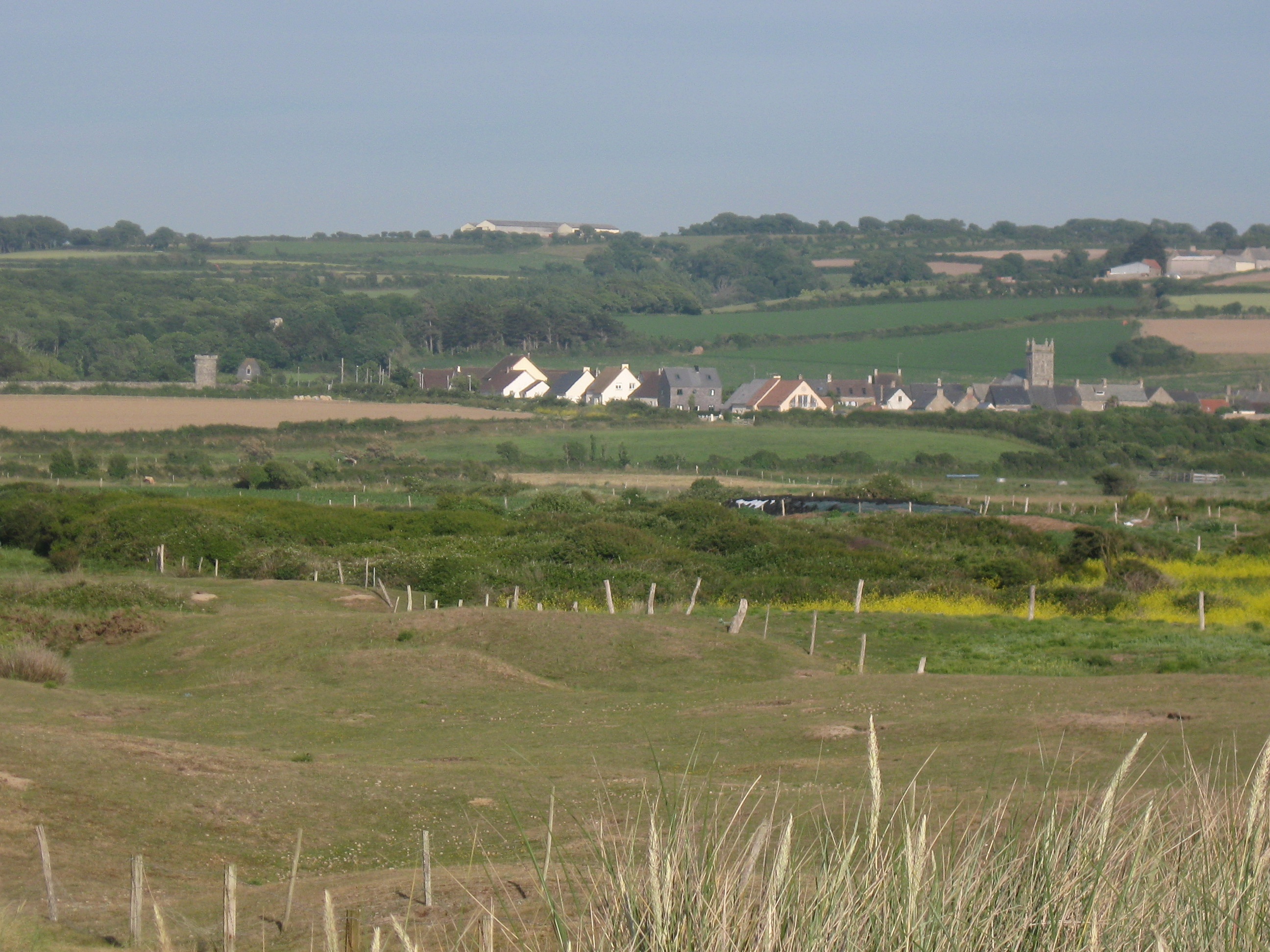
- The village
- Location of Le Rozel
- Location within France Location within Normandy
- Coordinates: 49°29′16″N 1°49′39″W
- Country: France
- Region: Normandy
- Department: Manche
- Arrondissement: Cherbourg
- Canton: Les Pieux
- Intercommunality: CA Cotentin

Government
  - Mayor (2020–2026): Noël Lamotte
- Area^{1}: 5.52 km^{2} (2.13 sq mi)
- Elevation: 20 m (66 ft)
- Highest elevation: 102 m (335 ft)
- Lowest elevation: 0 m (0 ft)
- Population (2023): 258
  - Density: 46.7/km^{2} (121/sq mi)
- Time zone: UTC+01:00 (CET)
  - Summer (DST): UTC+02:00 (CEST)
- INSEE/Postal code: 50442 /50340
- ^{1} French Land Register data, which excludes lakes, ponds, glaciers > 1 km^{2} (0.386 sq mi or 247 acres) and river estuaries.

Le Rozel (French pronunciation: [lə ʁozɛl]) is a commune in the Manche department in Normandy in north-western France.

Its INSEE number is 50442, and its postal code is 50340.

== Prehistory ==
Neanderthals are thought to have been in the area, around 80,000 years ago, with evidence provided by 257 footprints fossilised in sandy mud alongside other archaeological material, excavated between 2012 and 2017. Most of the footprints were small and clearly made by children (10-14 people). The discovery at Le Rozel is the largest of rare fossil footprints of the hominin. Technically, some of the footprints were isolated one after another and 88 of them were complete footprints, having a length range between 11.4 cm (4.5 in) and 28.7 cm (11.3 in).

== See also ==
- Communes of the Manche department
