= Abbey of Saint-Sauveur-le-Vicomte =

Abbey in Manche, France

Coordinates: 49.3822°N 1.5258°W

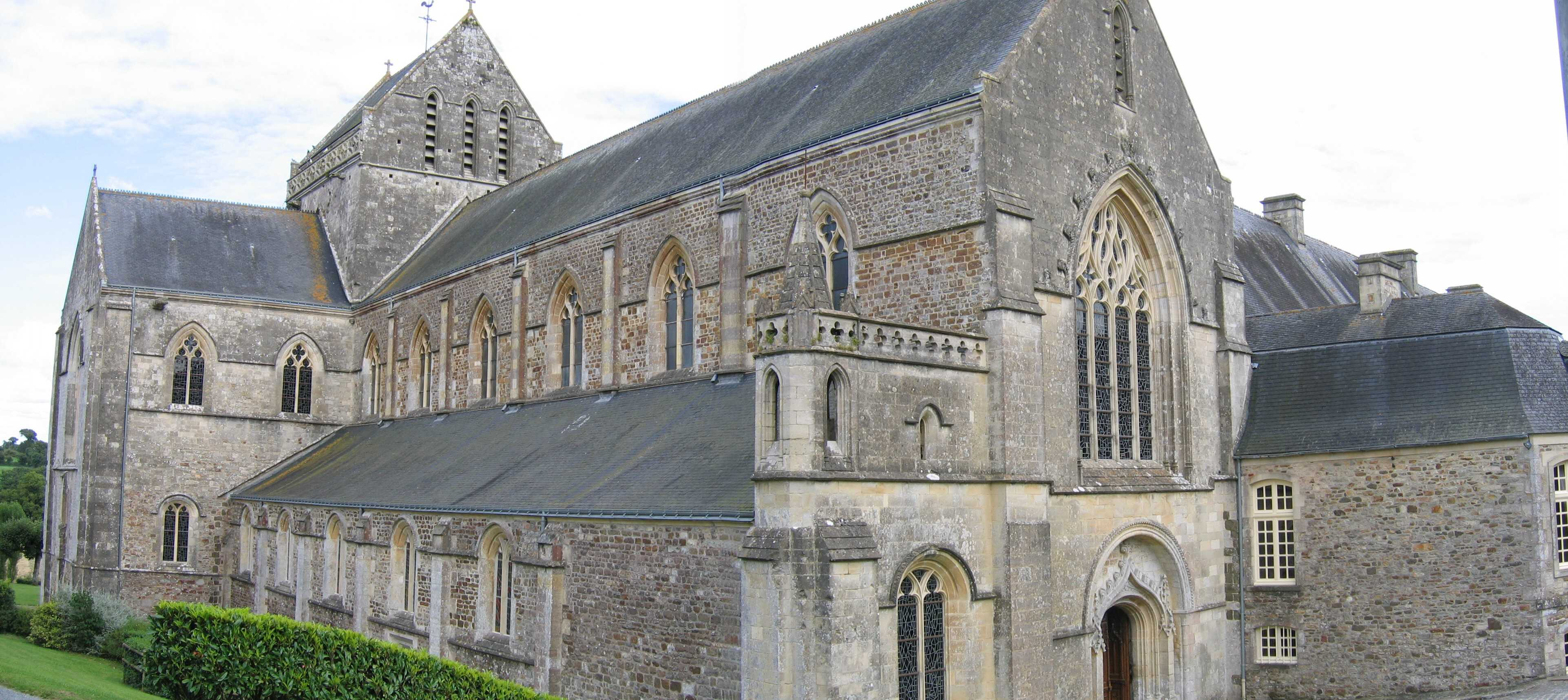
Abbey of Saint-Sauveur

The Abbey of Saint-Sauveur-le-Vicomte (French: Abbaye de Saint-Sauveur-le-Vicomte), located in the commune of Saint-Sauveur-le-Vicomte in the Manche department of France, was a Benedictine monastery founded in the 11th century by Néel de Néhou, Vicomte of Saint-Sauveur. The abbey has longstanding connections with the nearby Channel Islands. After being dissolved in the French Revolution it became in the 1830s the mother house of the Sisters of Christian Schools of Mercy, now the Congregation of Saint Marie-Madeleine Postel.

== Establishment ==
Starting in 1067, the abbey was built by the monks of Jumièges Abbey for the founder Néel de Néhou, Vicomte of Saint-Sauveur, to replace the college of secular clergy who officiated in the chapel of his castle. Around 1180 the first windmill was installéd there. The abbey was consecrated "in the early years of the second half of the twelfth century" by Bishop Algare. However, it was not completed until 1198, at the wedding of Mathilde, the daughter of Raoul Tesson, with Richard, Baron of Harcourt. The construction of the abbey lasted more than thirty years under the three families of Saint-Sauveur, La Roche-Tesson and Harcourt.

== Hundred Years' War ==
During the Hundred Years' War, the then Vicomte, Geoffroy d'Harcourt, was forced to yield his castle at Saint-Sauveur to the English commander John Chandos, who razed the choir of the abbey church, forcing the monks to take refuge in Cherbourg-en-Cotentin and in their possessions in Jersey. They were not able to return until 1422.

Restoration work was undertaken after the battle of Formigny in 1450 and the expulsion of the English, under direction of abbot Jean Caillot. The choir, which had been levelled, had to be rebuilt at this time. However, part of the conventual buildings disappeared, as the introduction of commendatory abbots reduced the funds available for rebuilding.

Jacques Le Febvre du Quesnoy, Bishop of Coutances and abbot of Saint-Sauveur, died at the abbey and was buried in the chancel of the church.

== French Revolution ==
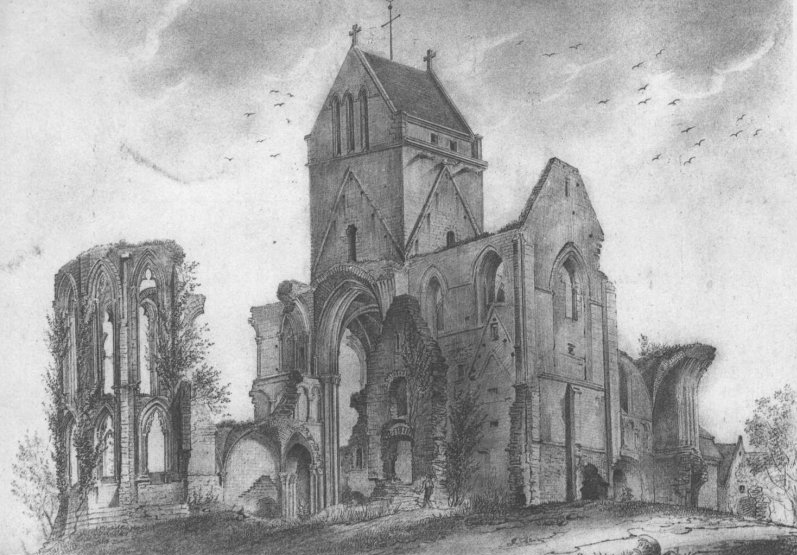
Ruins of the abbey church (19th-century engraving)

During the French Revolution, a decree prohibiting monastic vows was passed on 13 February 1790. The abbey was sold as national property on 4 June 1791. The bailiff Hector Louis Amédée Ango, grandfather of Barbey d'Aurevilly, thought to protect the abbey church by transferring the parish service to it, but his plan was opposed by the constitutional priest Fr. Nigault de Lecange. The church was sold for 8,525 livres on 23 May 1793 and used as a quarry.

== Ruins of the Abbey of Saint Sauveur ==
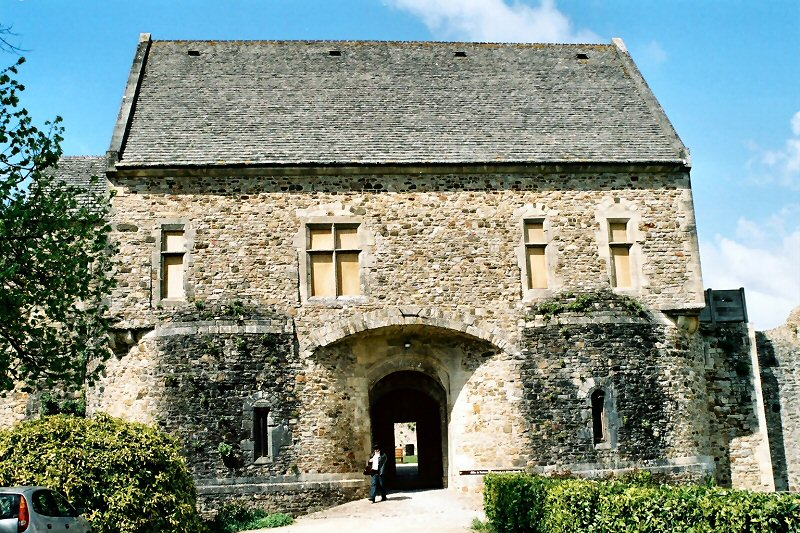
One of the two houses remaining in the abbey in 1832

Gerville notes that in 1825 "the demolition of buildings is advanced." In 1831, demolition continued, as mentioned by the English antiquarian Henry Gally Knight. In 1832 Mother Marie-Madeleine Postel (later canonised) was able to buy the abbey ruins that she wanted to make the parent of the congregation that she had founded in Cherbourg. There then remained only two small low houses to the left of the church and the entrance porch and the lower part of a building that had served as a cellar and storeroom.

The abbey church was included on the first list of Prosper Mérimée in 1840. Two years later, in 1842, the reconstructed bell tower collapsed after a violent storm, and destroyed the transept and the first bays of the choir. Undeterred, Mother Marie-Madeleine Postel, despite her advanced age, undertook to rebuild the entire building by entrusting the work to François Halley, a local architect and sculptor.

To finance the works she sent her niece, Sister Placide Viel (later Blessed Placide), to ask for help from Queen Marie-Amélie, wife of Louis-Philippe I.

The reconstruction was finished in 1855, nine years after the death of its champion. Her relics are preserved in the north transept, in a tomb by François Halley. In the same chapel are the relics of Blessed Placide Viel and also those of Blessed Marthe Le Bouteiller.

== Abbots ==
- Benign, monk of Jumièges, the first abbot of Saint-Sauveur-le-Vicomte.
- Ancelin
- -1147: Ansfroi or Onsfroy Robert disciple Tombelaine, abbot of Saint-Vigor of Bayeux.
- 1147-after 1168: Hugh I, monk of Mont Saint-Michel.
- William I.
- 1173-: Roger I of Salmonville
- Hugh II
- Robert Veules also called Robust ferrules.
- Humphrey II
- 1250-: Peter I, 10th abbot.
- 1266-: William II
- Thomas I.
- -after 1298: John I of Condren
- 1299-1305: Thomas II of Aubigny or Aubigne, prosecutor of the abbey.
- Thomas III
- 1305-1322: Nicolas I of the Garden
- 1322-1362: Peter II Morice
- 1362-1376: Peter III Langlois
- 1376-1390: Thomas IV of Bigard
- 1390-1394: Denis Latch, 20th abbot.
- -to 1422: Michel de la Hougue
- 1429-1439: William III Rev., Member of the Council of Basel in 1435.
- 1440-1444: Etienne Hauquet
- 1444-1451: Louis I Hermon or Hervieu
- 1451-1470: Jean II Clot
- 1470-1471: Jacques I Clot

Abbey in commendam.

- 1472-1473: Reginald or Renaud de Bourbon, Bishop of Laon. After being dismissed, he became archbishop of Narbonne
- 1473-1483 Guy Lauvet or Lauret, Apostolic Prothonotary.
- Hyacinthe Chamillard
- 1483-: William IV of St. Felix, 30th abbot. He attends the General of Normandy in 1485.
- 1486-1505: Rodolphe Raoul or Boniface, monk and bishop of Carpentras.
- -1514: Jacques II Mahieu
- 1514-1517: Jacques Langlois III, elected by the monks.
- 1522-1529: William V Troussey, a monk of the abbey, last regular abbot.
- 1529-1548: Charles I Panyot, abbot.
- 1548-1557: The Gruyer John III, dean of the Chapter of Troyes. He retired from office.
- 1557-1573: Jacques IV Grimouville
- 1573-1576: Jacques IV Hoop
- -1628: Louis II de Nogaret, Archbishop of Toulouse, Cardinal.
- 1628- Charles II of Montchal, 40th abbot. Preceptor of Louis de Nogaret, Archbishop of Toulouse, He removed the manuscripts from the abbey to enrich his own library. He resigned in favor of his nephew.
- Charles III of Ruolz, doctor of the Sorbonne, advisor ordinary chaplain of the King, nephew of Charles de Montchal.
- 1653-1683: John IV of Orange Rocks
- 1684-1740: Simon Cuvier of Bussiere, canon of Prémery. He reconstructed the abbey archives.
- 1740-1743: Louis Auguste III or Louis François de Rohan-Chabot7.
- 1743-1764: Jacques Le Fevre VI Quesnoy, Canon of Coutances, archdeacon of Leonor II of Matignon (Bishop of Coutances) then Bishop of Coutances. Death September 2, 1764, he was buried in the choir of the abbey church. He was later transferred to the parish church of Saint-Sauveur-le-Vicomte.
- Choiseul
- 1766-1790: Aimar-Claude Nicolaï, 47th and last abbot of Saint-Sauveur-le-Vicomte. Canon of Paris, vicar general of Verdun and Reims, Bishop of Béziers.

Congregation of the Sisters of the Christian Schools of Mercy

- 1832 St. Mary Magdalen Postel
- 1846 Blessed Placide Viel
- 1877: Aline La Croix

Modern refounding

- 2002 Cécile Banse
