= Aimée-Adèle Le Bouteiller =

French religious sister (1816-1883)

Blessed Aimée-Adèle Le Bouteiller SMMP

Virgin
- Born: 2 December 1816; Percy, Manche, Kingdom of France
- Died: 18 March 1883 (aged 66); Saint-Sauveur-le-Vicomte, Manche, French Third Republic
- Venerated in: Roman Catholic Church
- Beatified: 4 November 1990, Saint Peter's Square, Vatican City by Pope John Paul II
- Feast: 18 March
- Attributes: Religious habit

Aimée-Adèle Le Bouteiller (2 December 1816 - 18 March 1883) was a French religious sister of the Sisters of Marie-Madeleine Postel. She assumed the religious name Marthe and became noted for her work for the congregation in a range of capacities.

She was close friends with Placide Viel who was her novice mistress; this would bring her into conflict with Viel's elder cousin who was at odds with Viel. Nevertheless, the religious attempted to live a model life based on the tenets of the Gospel.

She was beatified in 1990.

== Life ==
Aimée-Adèle Le Bouteiller was born on 2 December 1816 as the third of four children to Andrea Le Bouteiller (1788-1827) and Maria Francesca Morel who were farmers and linen weavers. Her mother became widowed and had to care for her four children with the death of Andrea on 1 September 1827 to tuberculosis. This prompted Bouteiller to help her mother manage the farm and seek out work and was all the more important when two of her brothers married in 1837.

She attended school as a child and one of her teachers was the Carmelite Maria Farcy.

In 1836 - at the age of 20 - she went to find work as a housemaid in order to provide for her mother. Bouteiller volunteered at her local parish school and travelled with her parish to annual pilgrimages to the Marian shrine of Cheppelle-sur-Vire. On one such pilgrimage in 1841 she visited a dilapidated convent and was resolved to enter it after having explored it.

On 19 March 1841 she joined the order of the Sisters of the Christian Schools in Saint-Sauveur-le-Vicomte and made her solemn profession as a religious on 14 September 1842 in the name of "Marthe". Her novice mistress at the time was Placide Viel. Bouteiller worked in the kitchens and the fields while also tending to the wine cellar. She became skilled at making cider and was known in the convent as "Sister Cider".

The Franco-Prussian War saw her tend to French troops at the convent and received the praise of the soldiers due to her careful attention to the spiritual and material needs of the men. She formed a special bond with Viel which was augmented amid the heated tension between Viel and her elder cousin - Marie - who ran the convent in Placide's absence. This also caused a significant rift between the Marie and Bouteiller. Viel's death in 1877 broke Bouteiller's heart and she could not bring herself to bid a final farewell to her novice mistress and friend.

Bouteiller fell and fractured her leg sometime in the winter of 1875–76. On Palm Sunday - 18 March 1883 - she went to bring bottles into the kitchen after dinner and fell to the ground. She did so again later in the evening and died not long after due to a stroke. She was interred at the convent.

== Beatification ==
The beatification process commenced in France in an informative process that opened in 1933 and concluded in 1934. Theologians declared her writings to be of an orthodox nature in a 28 February 1940 decree. The formal introduction to the cause on 1 February 1948 - under Pope Pius XII accorded the late religious with the title of Servant of God as the first official stage in the process. An apostolic process was also conducted following this. The Congregation of Rites validated the previous processes in Rome on 18 April 1953 while consultants and the Congregation for the Causes of Saints met and approved the cause on 23 November 1982. The C.C.S. themselves voted in favor once again on 27 June 1983 and would pass it to the pope for his approval.

On 24 September 1983 she was proclaimed to be Venerable after Pope John Paul II acknowledged that the late nun had lived a life of heroic virtue.

The miracle required for her to be beatified was investigated in the location that it had originated in and received full C.C.S. validation on 5 December 1987. This in turn allowed a medical board to discuss the healing and the latter voted in the affirmative for the healing as a miracle on 26 April 1989 while consulting theologians did so as well on 30 June 1989. The C.C.S. did so as well on 21 November 1989 and passed it to the pope who approved it on 21 December 1989.

John Paul II presided over the beatification on 4 November 1990.
