= Geoffroy d'Harcourt =

Norman noble

- Viscount of Saint-Sauveur
- Died: November 1356; St. Clement, Bay of Veys
- Buried: Abbey of Saint-Sauveur-le-Vicomte
- Noble family: Harcourt
- Father: John III d'Harcourt
- Mother: Alix of Brabant

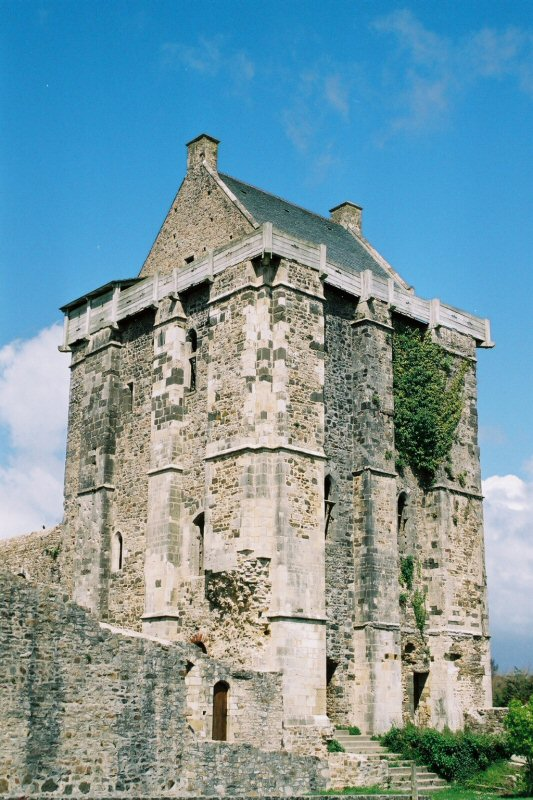
Château de Saint-Sauveur-le-Vicomte

Geoffroy d'Harcourt (died November 1356), called "the Lame", Viscount of Saint-Sauveur, was a 14th-century French nobleman and prominent soldier during the early stages of the Hundred Years' War.

== Biography ==
Geoffroy d'Harcourt was the youngest son of John III d'Harcourt, Viscount of Châtellerault and Saint-Sauveur, and Alix de Brabant, the daughter of Godfrey of Brabant. Harcourt was known as "the lame" due to him having a deformed leg, which made him limp. He was knighted in 1326 and inherited the Viscounty of Saint-Sauveur in 1330. In 1339, along with his older brother John IV of Harcourt, he became one of the 50 main Norman barons who pledged to help the King Philip VI of France in a future invasion of England. This attempt came to an end in 1340 with the annihilation of the French fleet during the Battle of Sluys, at the end of the Flanders campaign to which Geoffroy d'Harcourt participated with 6 knights and 30 squires.

Wanting to marry Jeanne, the daughter of Roger V Bacon and sole heiress of the Bacon of Molay family, Guillaume Bertrand, the son of the Harcourt's family's bitter rival Robert Bertrand, also sought the hand of the heiress. Philip VI gave the hand of the heiress to Guillaume, with Geoffroy aggrieved by this rebuttal and began around 1343, a private war against the Tancarville family. The king then intervened severely against Harcourt by ordering the seizure of his property and beheaded Geoffroy's loyal supporters; Jean Tesson of de la Roche Tesson, Guillaume Bacon of Blay and Richard III de Percy of Soulles, Sienne and Juaye in April 1344. They had been accused of having participated in a plot to place Harcourt at the head of the Duchy of Normandy by a secret alliance with King Edward III of England. Forced into exile, Harcourt retired to his lands in Flanders where he was greeted by his cousin, Duke John III of Brabant.

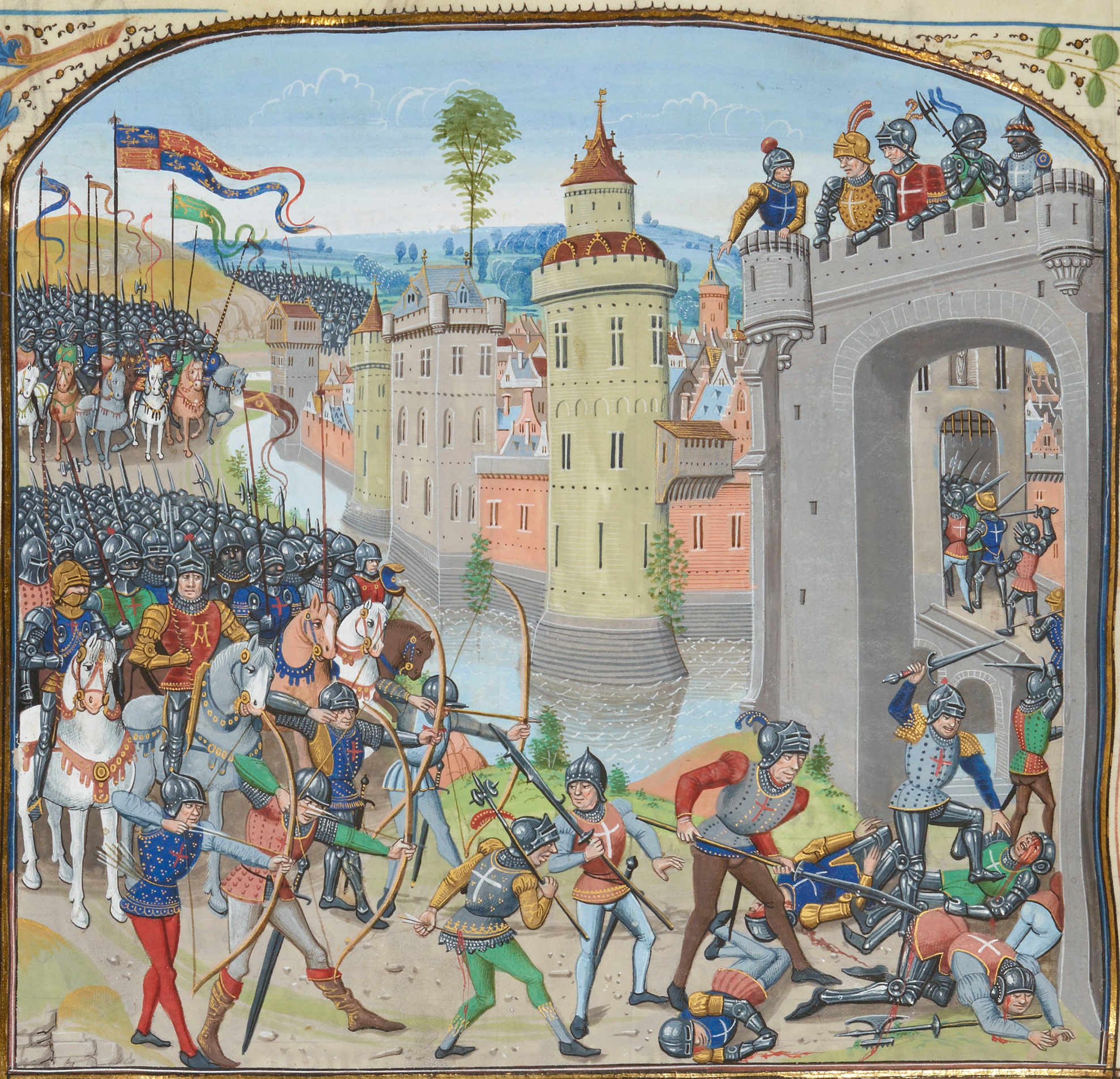
Capture of Caen by Edward III of England and Geoffroy d'Harcourt.

Hoping to regain his Norman strongholds, Harcourt travelled to England where he placed himself in the service of Edward III, whom he paid homage as the King of France. By letters patent given at Westminster, Edward III promised to procure for him in England some lands, in compensation for those which he had left in Brabant, and to put him in possession of his Norman strongholds.

Edward III made him commander, along with Thomas de Beauchamp, 11th Earl of Warwick, of one of the three army groups which landed at Saint-Vaast La Hougue on 12 July 1346.

Harcourt led Edward III's army through Normandy, capturing Saint-Sauveur, the castle of Jeanne Bacon and took part in the capture of Caen. He convinced the Edward III to put an end to the massacre of the population. He was in the English kings guard during the English victory at the Battle of Crécy. His elder brother Count John IV of Harcourt, governor of Rouen, died while fighting on the French side. Recognising the body of his brother killed in the French ranks, after the battle, he was beset with remorse and afterwards began negotiations with Philip VI, to return to the side of the French.

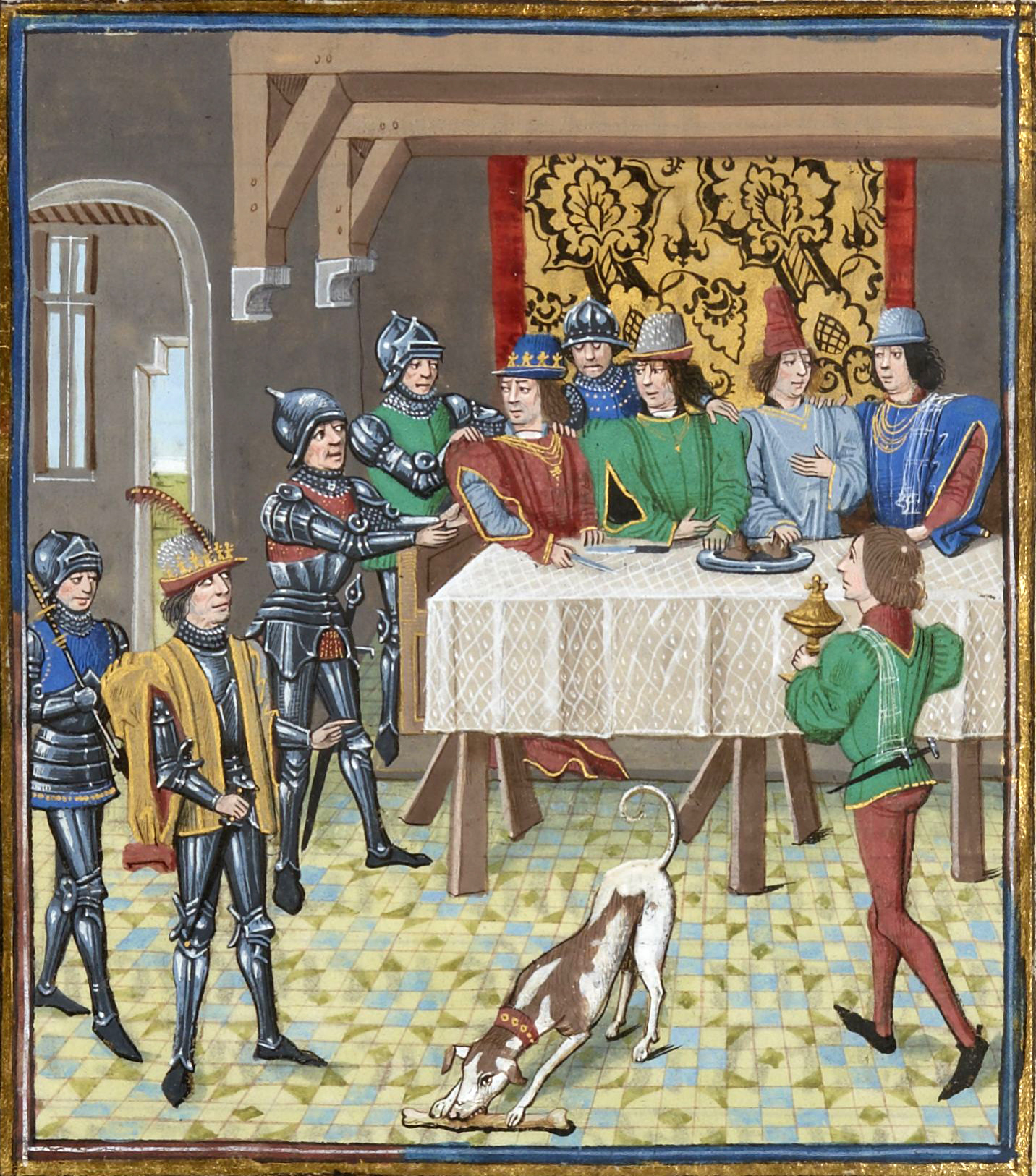
Arrest of the King of Navarre and Count Harcourt at the banquet of Rouen.

Geoffroy obtained a pardon from Philip VI, who probably had no other choice due to being weakened by defeat. From 1347, Harcourt is captain-ruler of Rouen and Caen, with permission to levy taxes and troops. Noting this change of allegiance, Edward III confiscates his property in England. When Charles, Duke of Normandy, summoned his vassals to Rouen, on the Sunday of Epiphany 1355, Harcourt refused to do homage after Charles took offence of Harcourt.

During a banquet at Rouen, King John II of France had Geoffrey's nephew John V, Count of Harcourt arrested and executed without trial. Geoffroy narrowly escaped the ambush set by the king. In order to avenge his nephew, he allied himself again with Edward III of which he made the legatee of his fortress of Saint-Sauveur by a charter published on 18 July 1356. From 1 August, the King of England gave his protection to Harcourt, whom he called his "cousin".

Towards the end of November 1356, Harcourt attempted to ambush a French raiding party at night at the Ford of St. Clement, in the Bay of Veys. However, Harcourt found himself cornered and encircled by eight French men-at-arms and numerous archers. When given the opportunity to surrender, Harcourt contemptuously rejected the offer, shouting "By my mother's soul, the Duke shall not have me alive". Choosing to fight to the death, Harcourt was quickly cut down by the French soldiers.
