= Château de Saint-Sauveur-le-Vicomte =

Castle ruin in Normandy

Coordinates: 49°23′11″N 1°31′41″W

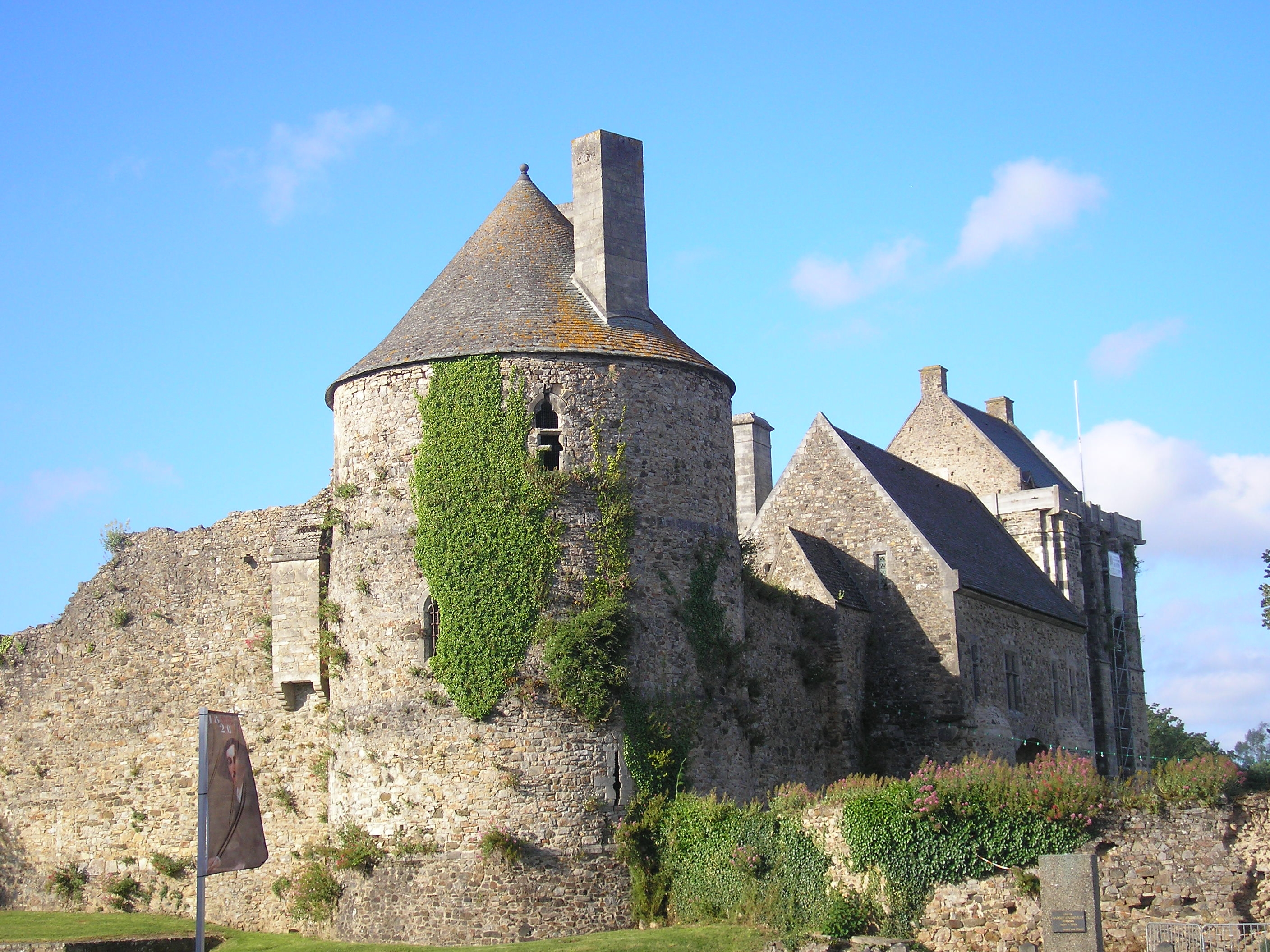

The Château de Saint-Sauveur-le-Vicomte (French pronunciation: [ʃato də sɛ̃ sovœʁ lə vikɔ̃t]) is a castle ruin in the commune of Saint-Sauveur-le-Vicomte, in the northwestern French department of Manche.

The castle, dating from the 11th and 12th centuries, was besieged twice during the Hundred Years' War. The remains consist of a fortified enceinte with towers and a massive keep.

The castle is open to the public. It has been listed since 1840 as a monument historique by the French Ministry of Culture.

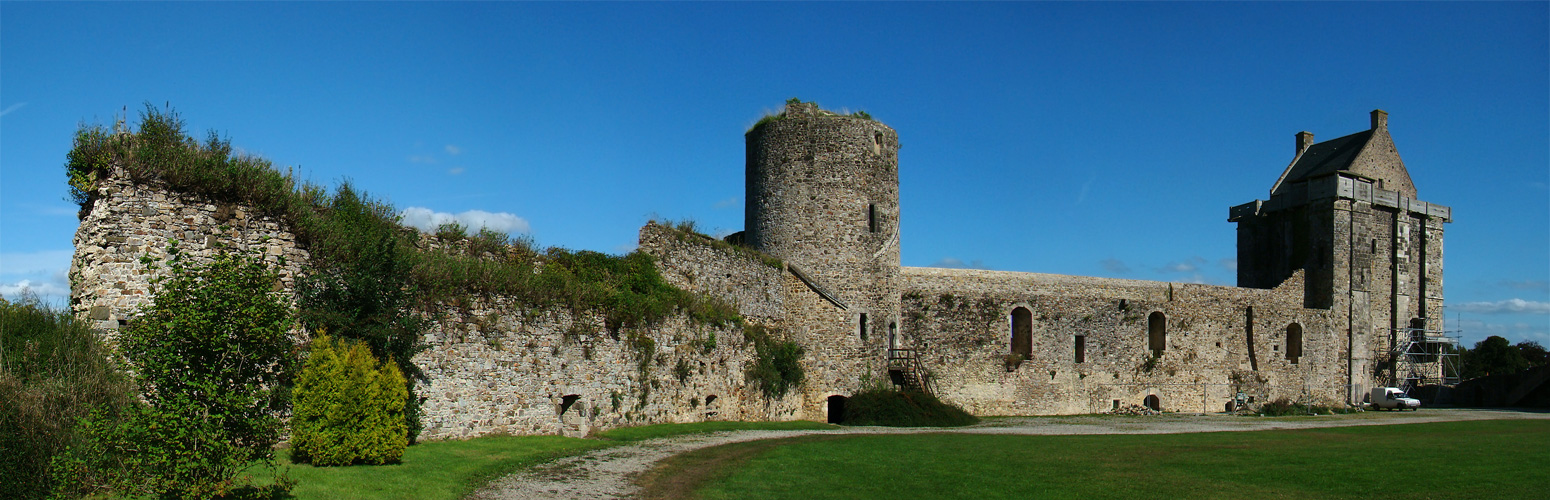

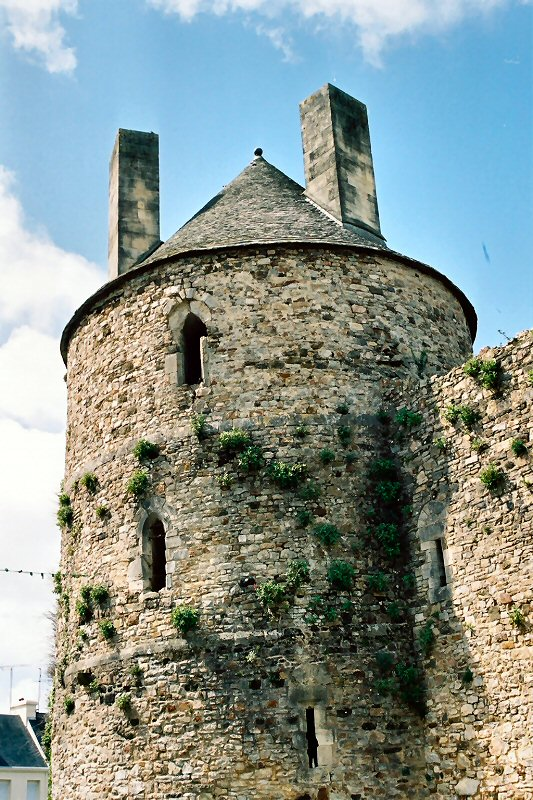
Saint-Sauveur-le Vicomte (château)

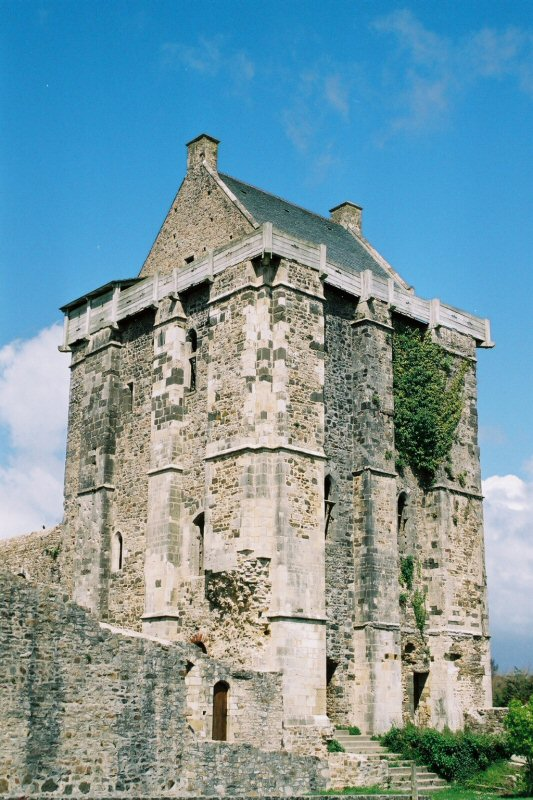
Saint-Sauveur-le Vicomte (château)

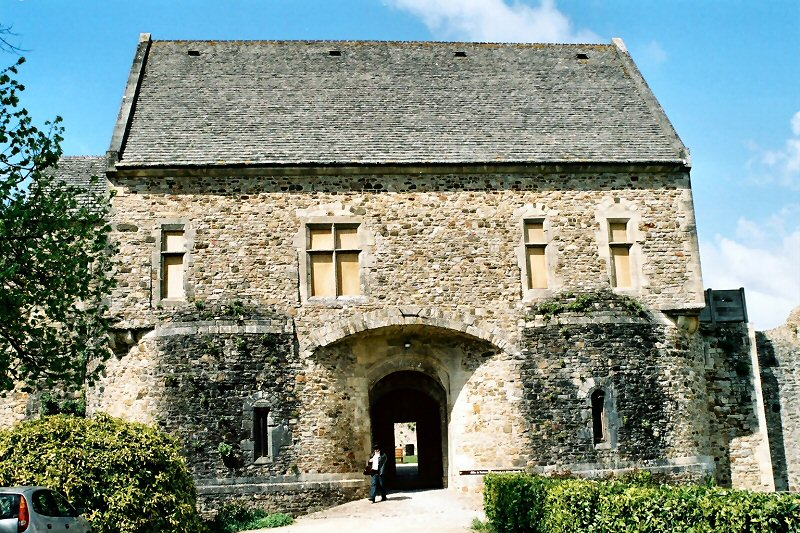
Saint-Sauveur-le Vicomte (château)

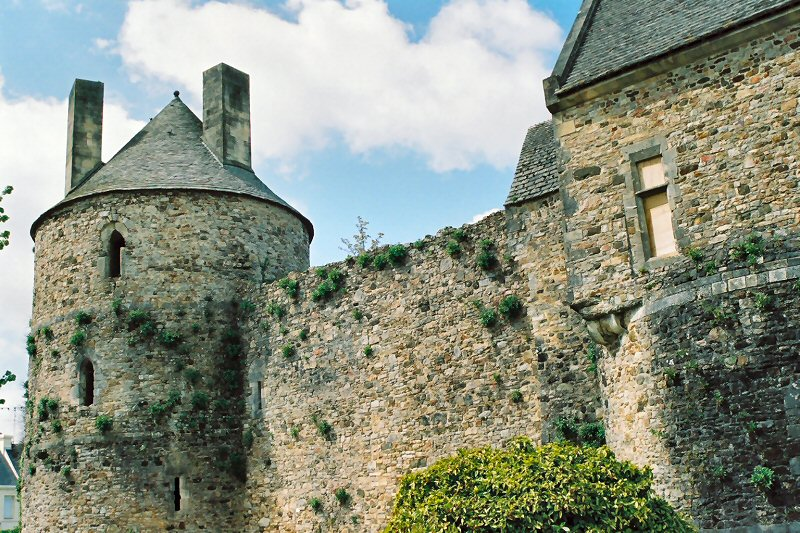
Saint-Sauveur-le Vicomte (château)

== See also ==
- List of castles in France
