= Morsalines =

- Part of Quettehou
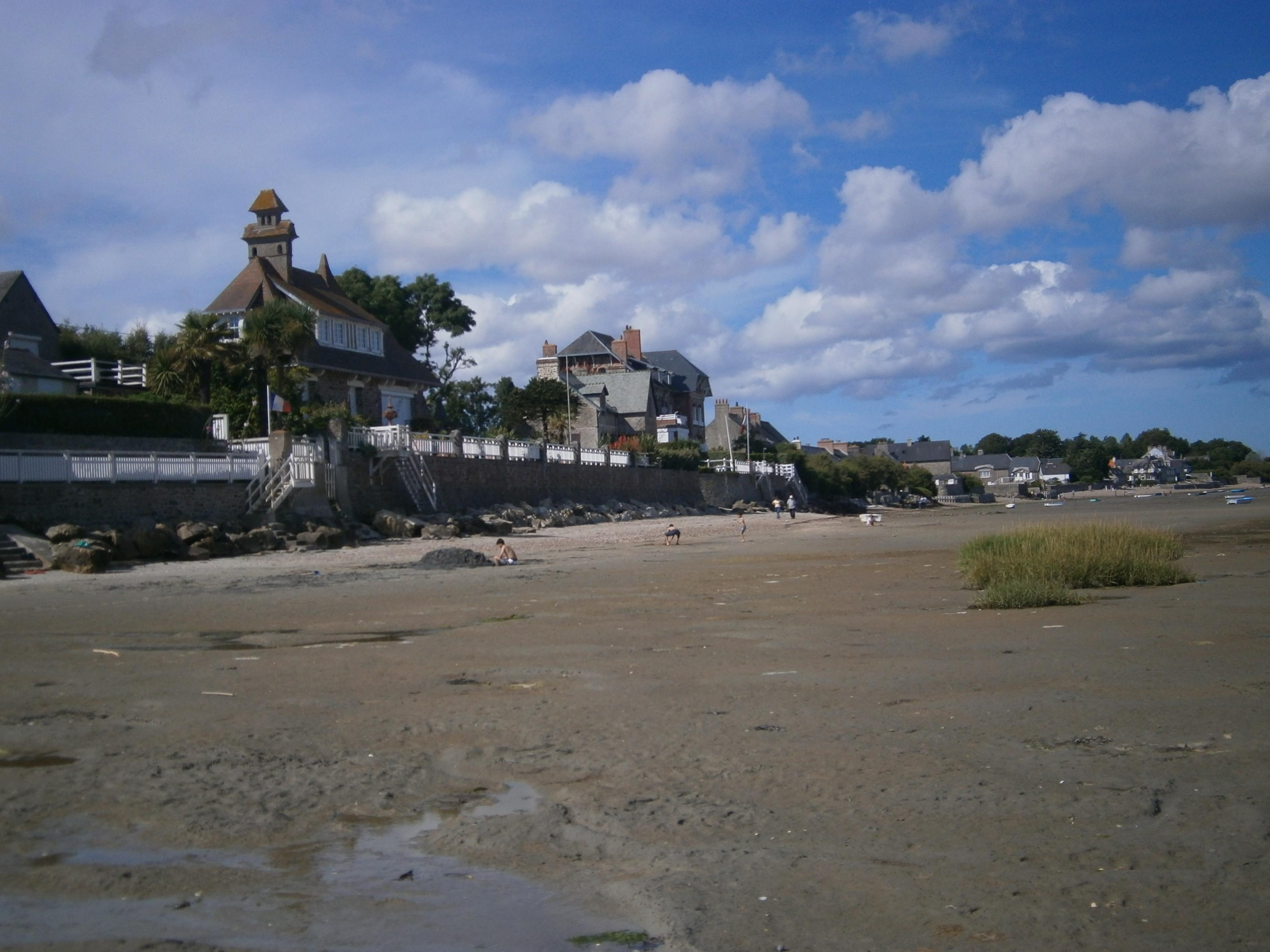
- Seafront
- Location of Morsalines
- Location within France Location within Normandy
- Coordinates: 49°34′25″N 1°18′42″W
- Country: France
- Region: Normandy
- Department: Manche
- Arrondissement: Cherbourg
- Canton: Val-de-Saire
- Commune: Quettehou
- Area^{1}: 3.65 km^{2} (1.41 sq mi)
- Elevation: 10 m (33 ft)
- Highest elevation: 88 m (289 ft)
- Lowest elevation: 3 m (9.8 ft)
- Population (2018): 205
  - Density: 56.2/km^{2} (145/sq mi)
- Demonym: Morsalinais
- Time zone: UTC+01:00 (CET)
  - Summer (DST): UTC+02:00 (CEST)
- Postal code: 50630
- ^{1} French Land Register data, which excludes lakes, ponds, glaciers > 1 km^{2} (0.386 sq mi or 247 acres) and river estuaries.

Morsalines is a former commune in the Manche department in Normandy in north-western France. On 1 January 2019, it was merged into the commune Quettehou.

== See also ==
- Communes of the Manche department
