= Placide Viel =

French Roman Catholic saint

Blessed Placide Viel
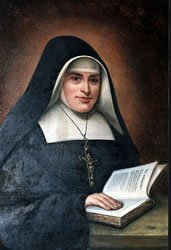
- Painting.

Religious
- Born: 26 September 1815; Quettehou, Normandy, Kingdom of France
- Died: 4 March 1877 (aged 61); Saint-Sauveur-le-Vicomte, Manche, French Third Republic
- Venerated in: Roman Catholic Church
- Beatified: 6 May 1951, Saint Peter's Basilica, Vatican City by Pope Pius XII
- Feast: 4 March
- Attributes: Religious habit

Placide Viel (26 September 1815 — 4 March 1877), born Eulalie-Victoire Jacqueline Viel, was a French Roman Catholic professed religious and mother general who was active in organizing relief during the Franco-Prussian War.

Viel joined the Sisters of the Christian Schools in 1833 with the order's founder and mother general Saint Marie-Madeleine Postel being her aunt and served alongside her in various capacities. Viel made extensive travels setting up branches of the order and made several trips to Paris to collect funds for the order's expansion while later travelling across Europe as her aunt's successor for the order's continued growth.

Her beatification was celebrated in 1951.

== Life ==
Eulalie Victoire Jacqueline Viel was born in France on 26 September 1815 as one of eight children to farmers (she was baptized just moments after her birth with her godparents being Jeanne Viel and Jacques Tournaille). Her aunt was Saint Marie-Madeleine Postel. One sister was Victoire who died in her childhood. Viel was known for being timid but also pleasant and cheerful; she made her First Communion before the mandated age because the parish priest of Quettehou believed she was mature enough. Her parents sent her to learn sewing when she was old enough from the village seamstress Madame Gilles and she taught catechism and the psalms to the local children.

Her heart was set on the religious life and she joined her aunt in her new religious congregation on 1 May 1835 while being given the new religious name "Placide" and served at some stage as the novice mistress after having first worked in the kitchens. Her solemn profession of perpetual vows was made on 21 September 1838. Viel studied at Argentan as she entered the order and worked in school administration while founding new convents at her aunt's request. Her aunt also instructed her to go to Paris to collect funds so the order could continue to grow and function. Viel made three such visits with the first being from January to June 1844. The second was from October 1844 to 1845 and the last visit before her appointment as superior-general was from October 1845 to June 1846 when she had to return to see her ailing aunt. It was on one of those visits that she met with Queen Marie-Amelie. In the late spring of 1845 she toured Rennes and Nantes before moving on to Saint-Brieuc.

On 1 January 1842 she was appointed as assistant-general of the sisters in an appointment that caused great resentment among her sisters since some believed it granted her too much power. After her aunt died in 1846 she became the mother-general of the order at the age of 31 on 5 September (two months after her aunt's death) in what was a unanimous election. But she wanted to be able to continue going to Paris to collect funds rather than be elected though still rising to the position. Viel directed the institute for three decades and received papal approval for the order in 1859 from Pope Pius IX. Her tenure as superior-general saw membership in the order increase from 150 to more than 1,000 as well as seeing an increase in the number of convents. The superior-general was noted for her charm as well as for her humble and retiring disposition. On 14 September 1849 she arrived in Vienna where she met with its archbishop before setting off for Brussels. Viel made successive visits after Brussels to Cologne and Berlin as well as Breslau. Viel met with Count Henri on 19 September at the Frohsdorf castle and later met with Frederick William at Potsdam en route back home.

Viel died at Saint-Sauveur-le-Vicomte on 4 March 1877 after having been organizing relief during the Franco-Prussian War that had broken out around that time.

== Beatification ==
Her cause for canonization was introduced on 22 July 1935 titling her as a Servant of God while confirmation of her heroic virtue allowed for her to be named as Venerable on 9 February 1941. Pope Pius XII beatified her on 6 May 1951.
