= Quettehou =

- Commune
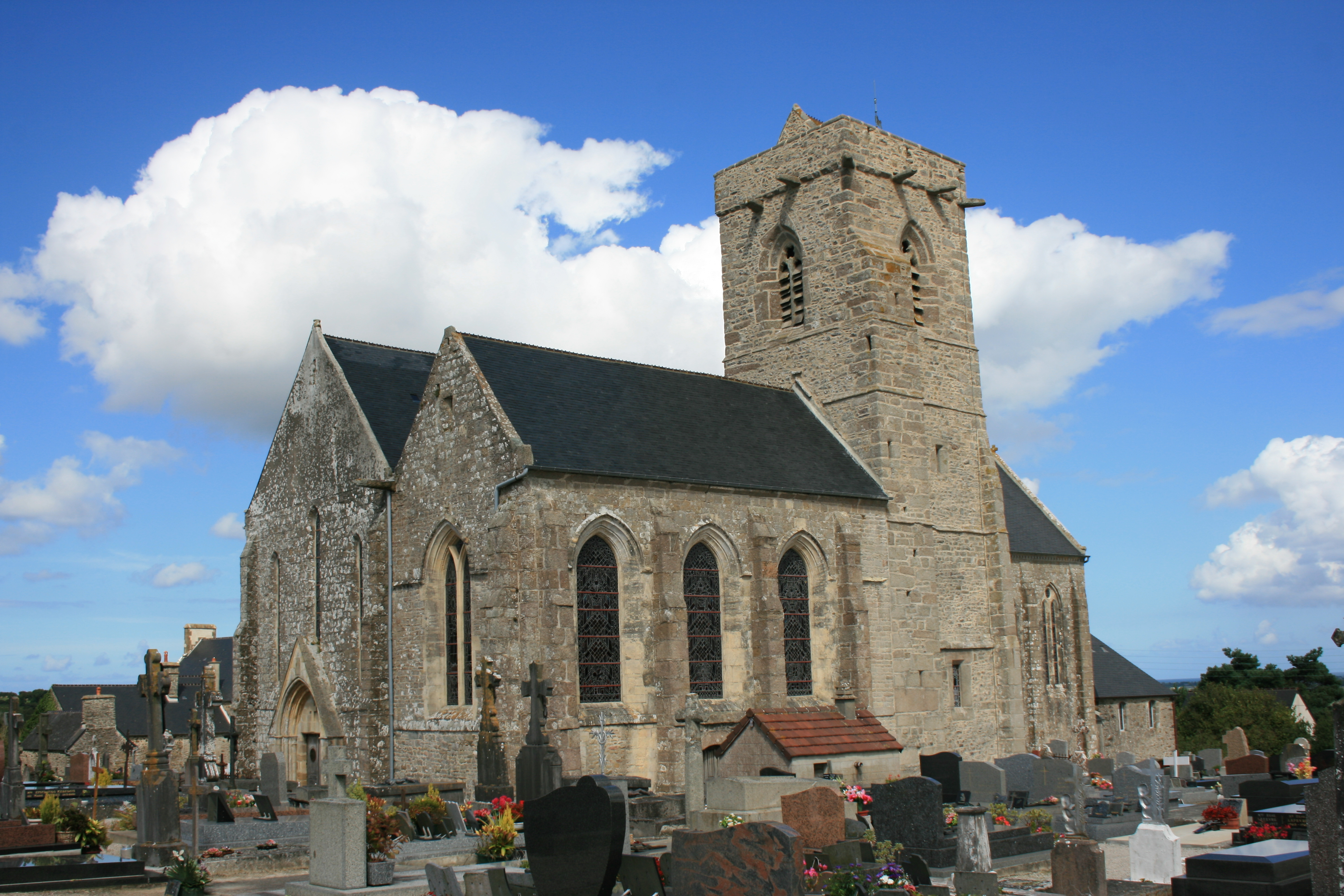
- The church of Saint-Vigor

- Coat of arms
- Location of Quettehou
- Location within France Location within Normandy
- Coordinates: 49°35′36″N 1°18′09″W
- Country: France
- Region: Normandy
- Department: Manche
- Arrondissement: Cherbourg
- Canton: Val-de-Saire
- Intercommunality: CA Cotentin

Government
  - Mayor (2023–2026): André Lefèvre
- Area^{1}: 19.82 km^{2} (7.65 sq mi)
- Elevation: 10 m (33 ft)
- Highest elevation: 104 m (341 ft)
- Lowest elevation: 1 m (3.3 ft)
- Population (2023): 1,811
  - Density: 91.37/km^{2} (236.7/sq mi)
- Time zone: UTC+01:00 (CET)
  - Summer (DST): UTC+02:00 (CEST)
- INSEE/Postal code: 50417 /50630
- ^{1} French Land Register data, which excludes lakes, ponds, glaciers > 1 km^{2} (0.386 sq mi or 247 acres) and river estuaries.

Quettehou ([ketu] or [kɛtu]) is a commune in the Manche department in north-western France. On 1 January 2019, the former commune Morsalines was merged into Quettehou.

== Geography ==
The town of Quettehou is located at the North-East tip of the peninsula of Cotentin in an area called Val de Saire, the vale of the river Saire.

== History ==
The creation of Quettehou dates back to the Viking invasions when Ketil, chief of a Viking tribe, decided to settle at the top of the hill dominating the bay of Morsalines. With time, Ketil's hill (Ketil holm) became known as Quettehou.

The Black Prince was knighted in the local church by his father, King Edward III of England, on 12 July 1346, prior to the Battle of Crécy.

== See also ==
- Communes of the Manche department
