= Marie-Madeleine Postel =

French Catholic religious foundress and saint

Saint Marie-Madeleine Postel
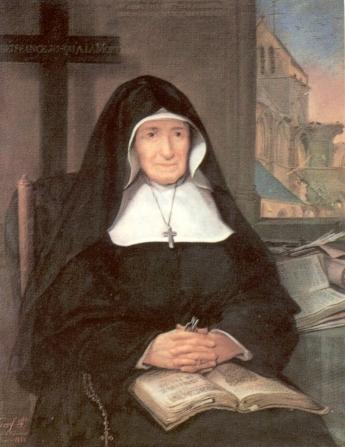
- Portrait, ca. 1840

Religious
- Born: 28 November 1756; Barfleur, Normandy, Kingdom of France
- Died: 16 July 1846 (aged 89); Saint-Sauveur-le-Vicomte, Manche, French Kingdom
- Venerated in: Catholic Church
- Beatified: 17 May 1908, Saint Peter's Basilica, Kingdom of Italy by Pope Pius X
- Canonized: 24 May 1925, Saint Peter's Basilica, Kingdom of Italy by Pope Pius XI
- Feast: 16 July
- Attributes: Religious habit; Crucifix
- Patronage: Sisters of Christian Schools

Marie-Madeleine Postel (28 November 1756 – 16 July 1846), born Julie Françoise-Catherine Postel, was a French Catholic professed religious and the founder of the Sisters of Christian Schools. Postel was also a member from the Third Order of Saint Francis and had served as a schoolteacher after the French Revolution where she oversaw the education of around 300 children. The Revolution saw her use her then-disbanded school to house fugitive priests despite the great risk that posed to her own life.

Postel's beatification was celebrated in 1908 and Pope Pius XI later canonized her in mid-1925.

== Life ==
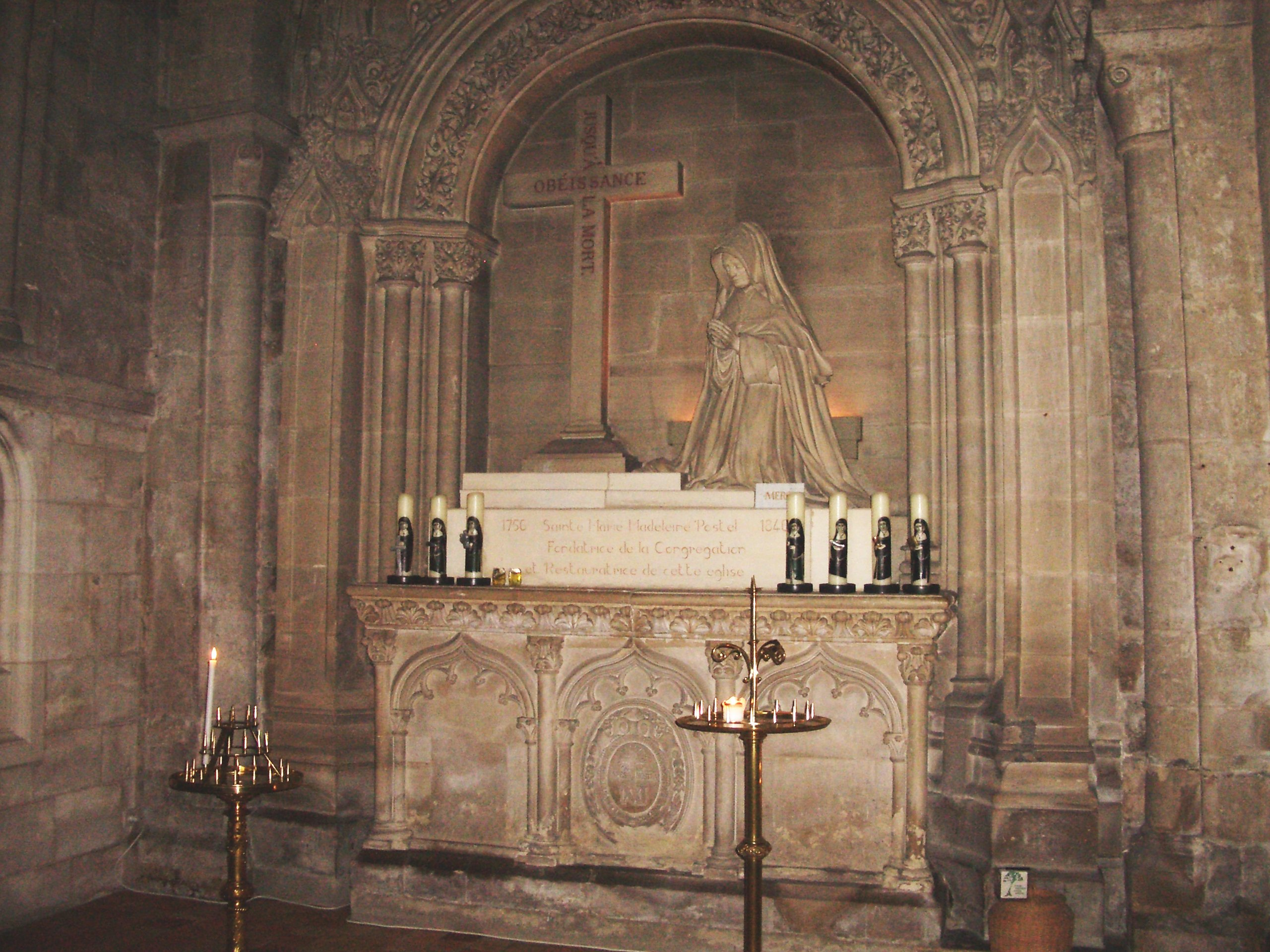
Postel's tomb in St-Sauveur-le-Vicomte

Julie Françoise-Catherine Postel was born on 28 November 1756 in Barfleur, Normandy, to the fisherman Jean Postel and Thérèse Levallois. Postel was the aunt to Placide Viel.

The Benedictine nuns oversaw her education in Valognes after her initial schooling and it was during that time that she discerned a call to serve God in the religious life; she took a private vow to remain chaste as a step forward in this dream. Postel founded a school for girls in Barfleur in 1774 that became a center for underground religious activities during the French Revolution for those who were unwilling to support the new regime. This school had been shut down at the Revolution's beginning. Authorization was granted to her to keep the Blessed Sacrament in her house as the conflict continued and she carried it on her person at times to provide the Viaticum to those who were ill and at the verge of death. The Jacobins often suspected her but never made allegations and left her alone.

The end of the Revolution saw Postel take up teaching and catechizing in Cherbourg where she taught around 300 children. Postel made her religious profession into the Third Order of Saint Francis in 1798 (while assuming her religious name) and founded the Sisters of the Christian Schools in Cherburg on 8 September 1807 which was met with little success until 1832 when she acquired a derelict convent in St-Sauveur-le-Vicomte to use as her headquarters which then prompted growth within the order. The Bishop of Coutances Claude-Louis Rousseau issued diocesan approval for her order and it went on to receive the papal decree of praise from Pope Pius IX on 29 April 1859; it received full papal approval much later in 1901. The order based itself on the Rule of the Franciscan Third Order though this later changed in 1837 to be based upon that of the De La Salle Brothers which also prompted a name change for the congregation.

Postel died in 1846; her order continues its work in places such as Romania and Mozambique and in 2005 had 442 religious in 69 different locations worldwide.

== Canonization ==
The cause for Postel's canonization began under Pope Leo XIII on 27 July 1897 at which stage Postel became titled as a Servant of God; Leo XIII later confirmed that Postel had lived a life of heroic virtue and named her as Venerable on 31 May 1903. Pope Pius X later signified on 22 January 1908 his approval to two investigated healings as miracles attributed to her and so beatified her on 17 May 1908. Pope Pius XI confirmed two additional miracles and canonized Postel on 24 May 1925.
