= Saint-Sauveur-le-Vicomte =

- Commune
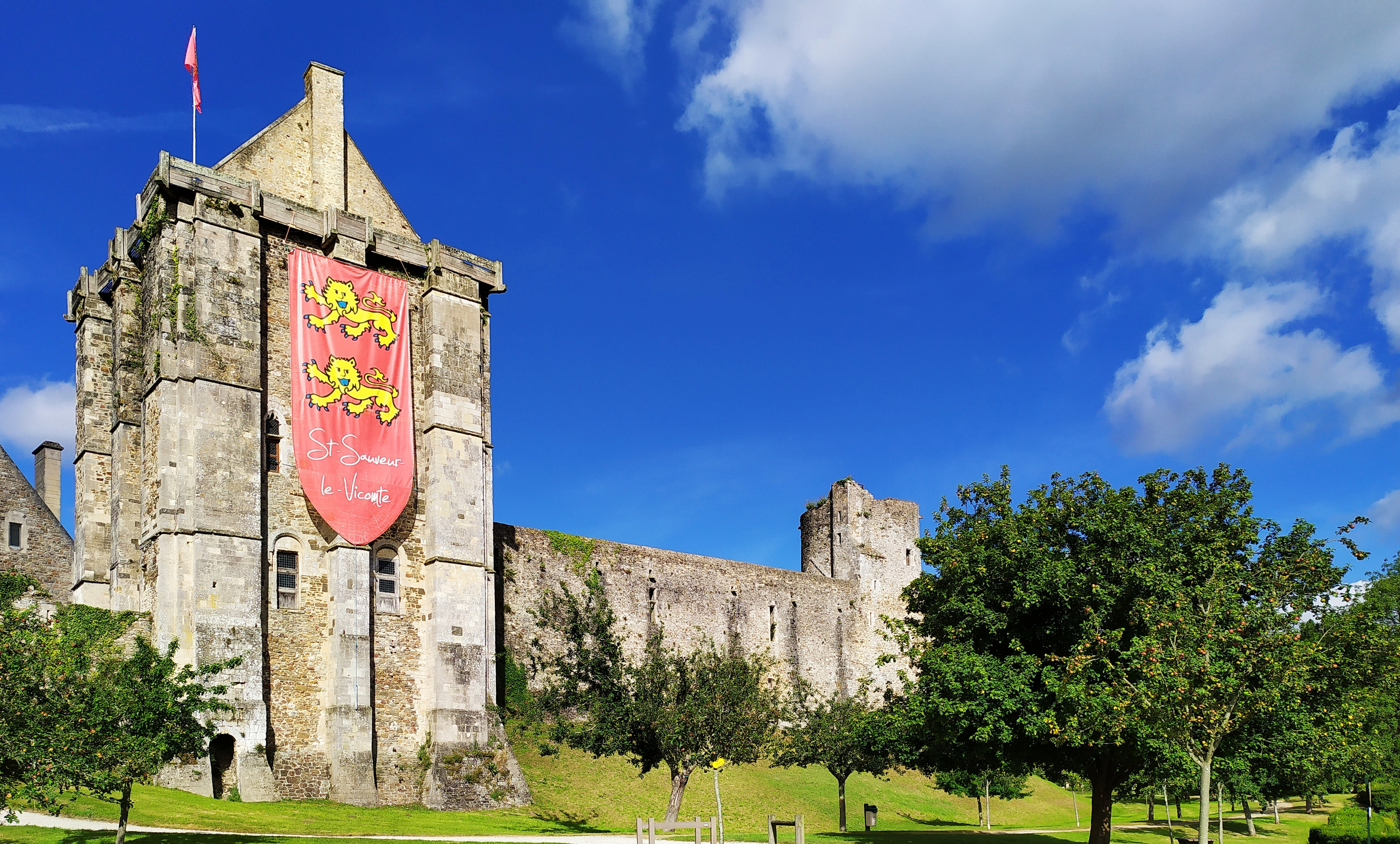
- The chateau in Saint-Sauveur-le-Vicomte

- Flag Coat of arms
- Location of Saint-Sauveur-le-Vicomte
- Location within France Location within Normandy
- Coordinates: 49°23′14″N 1°31′51″W
- Country: France
- Region: Normandy
- Department: Manche
- Arrondissement: Cherbourg
- Canton: Bricquebec-en-Cotentin
- Intercommunality: CA Cotentin

Government
  - Mayor (2020–2026): Eric Briens
- Area^{1}: 34.27 km^{2} (13.23 sq mi)
- Elevation: 30 m (98 ft)
- Population (2023): 2,114
  - Density: 61.69/km^{2} (159.8/sq mi)
- Time zone: UTC+01:00 (CET)
  - Summer (DST): UTC+02:00 (CEST)
- INSEE/Postal code: 50551 /50390
- ^{1} French Land Register data, which excludes lakes, ponds, glaciers > 1 km^{2} (0.386 sq mi or 247 acres) and river estuaries.

Saint-Sauveur-le-Vicomte (French pronunciation: [sɛ̃ sovœʁ lə vikɔ̃t]) is a commune in the Manche department in Normandy in north-western France. It is situated in the Cotentin Peninsula near Valognes. Its population was 2,099 in 2018.

== History ==
The Château de Saint-Sauveur-le-Vicomte, an ancient castle with massive 14th century towers, and a 12-15th century abbey still mark a vivid history during the Middle Ages.

The city walls were breached by cannon during a siege in 1374. This is believed to have been among the first successful uses of guns against city walls in history.

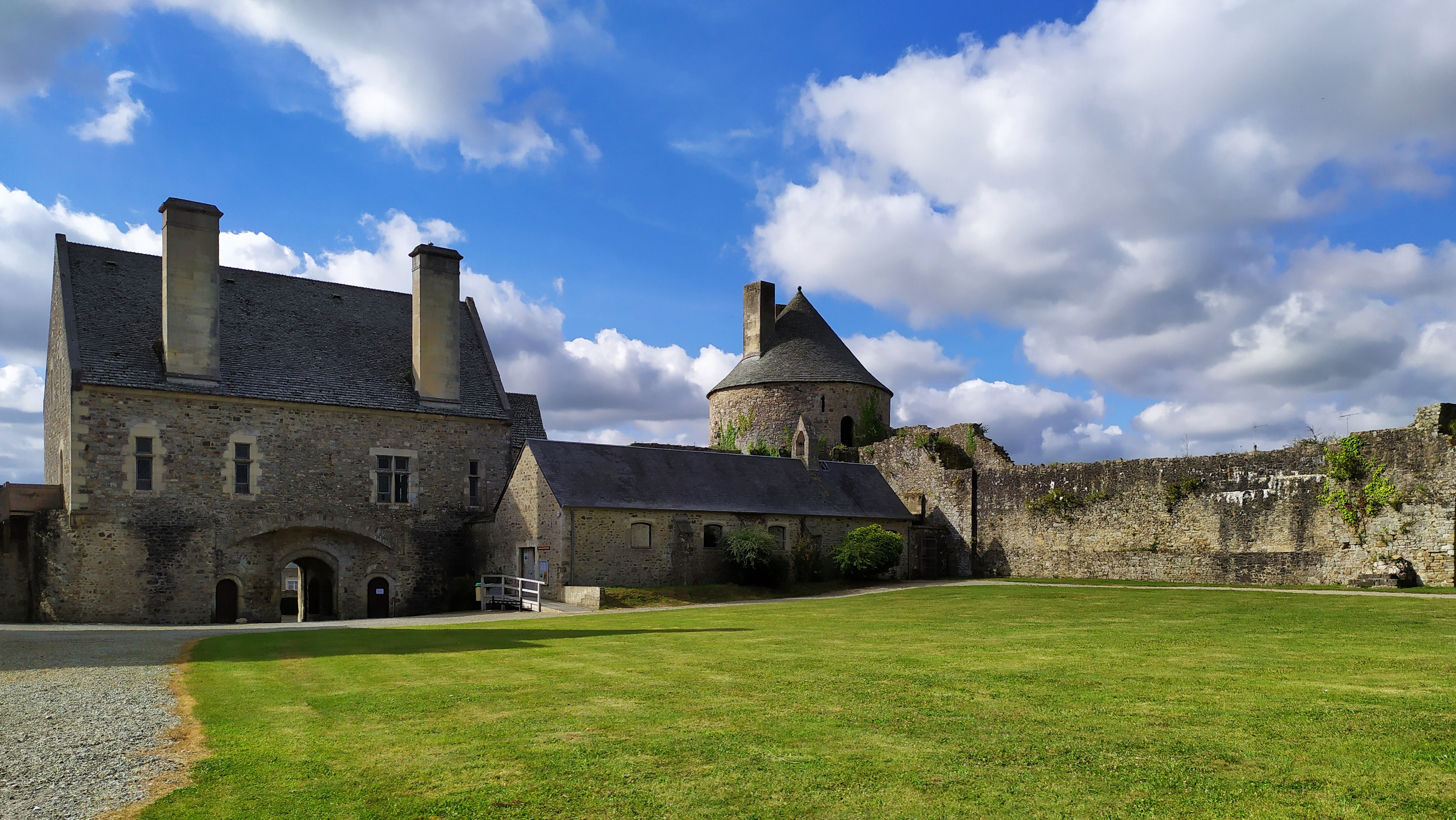
The fortress

== Population ==
Historical population
Year	Pop.	±% p.a.
1968	2,135	—
1975	2,168	+0.22%
1982	2,214	+0.30%
1990	2,257	+0.24%
1999	2,204	−0.26%
2007	2,063	−0.82%
2012	2,157	+0.90%
2017	2,132	−0.23%
2023	2,114	−0.14%
Source: INSEE

== Heraldry ==
Arms of Saint-Sauveur-le-Vicomte	The arms of Saint-Sauveur-le-Vicomte are blazoned : Gules, 2 fesses, in center point a triple towered castle, all between 3 pairs of sea-bass adorsed Or.

== Notable people ==
The English knight Sir John Chandos (died 1369) held the title Viscount of Saint-Sauveur-le Vicomte in the Cotentin.

Sir Alan Buxhull KG succeeded Sir John Chandos as Captain of the Castle during the 100 Years War.

The Blessed Catherine of St. Augustine, O.S.A., was born here in 1632. She was sent by her Order as a missionary nurse to New France, serving at the Hôtel-Dieu de Québec, where she died in 1668. She was beatified by Pope John Paul II in 1989.

The novelist Jules Amédée Barbey d'Aurevilly was born there on 2 November 1808. A museum is now dedicated to him.

Sister Marie-Madeleine Postel acquired the derelict Benedictine monastery at St-Sauveur-le-Vicomte in 1830 which became the headquarters of the Sisters of the Christian Schools of Mercy; in 1846 she died in the town.

Medieval knight Geoffroy d'Harcourt who fought for both the French, and the English, during the 100 years war.

== See also ==
- Communes of the Manche department
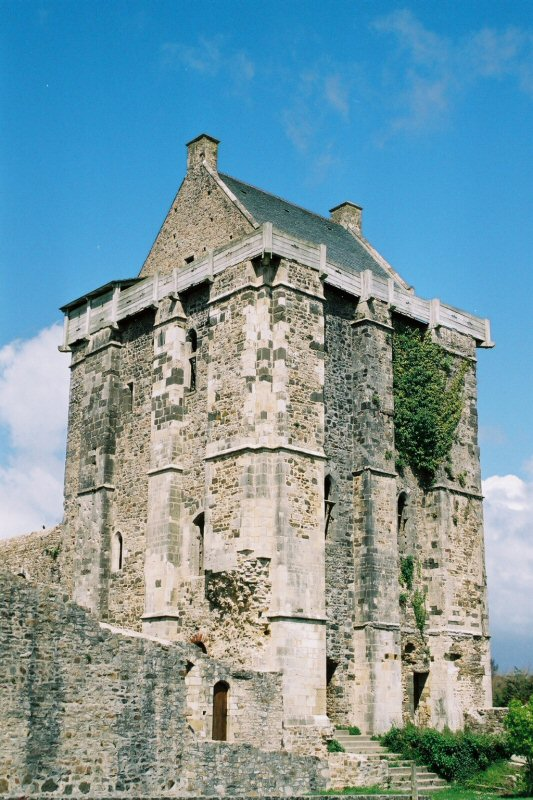
Saint-Sauveur-le Vicomte (fortress)

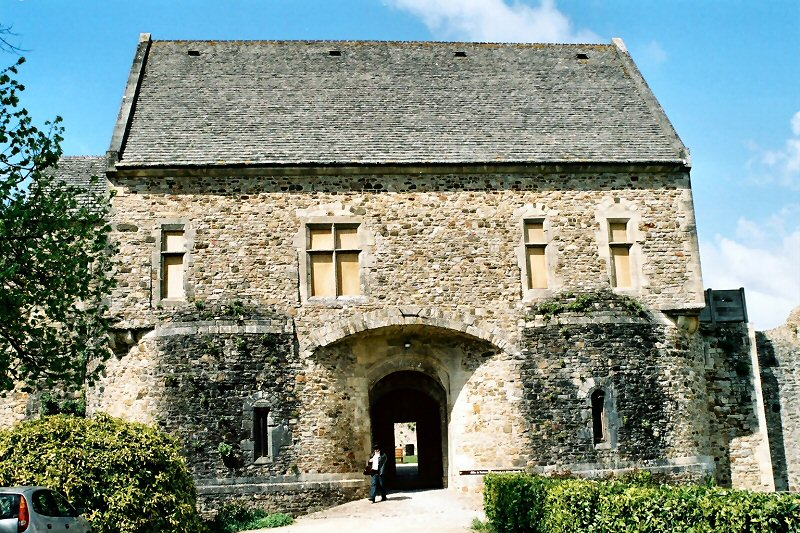
Saint-Sauveur-le Vicomte (abbey)

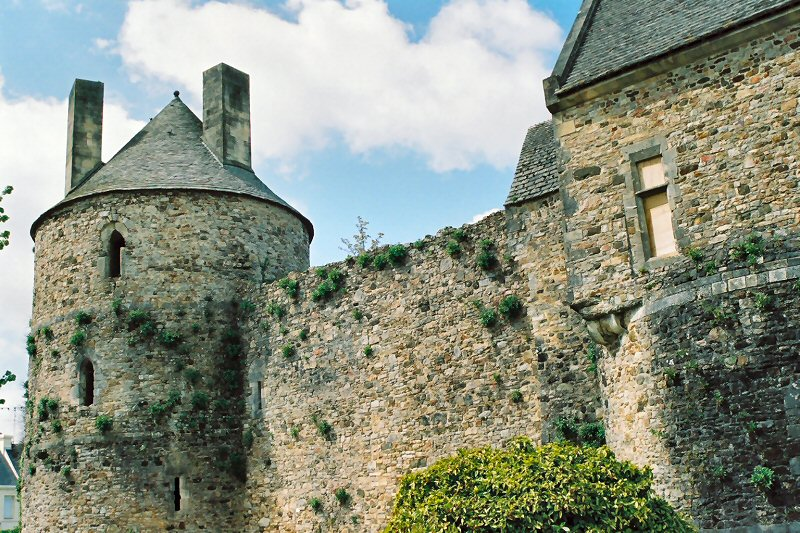
Saint-Sauveur-le Vicomte (stronghold)

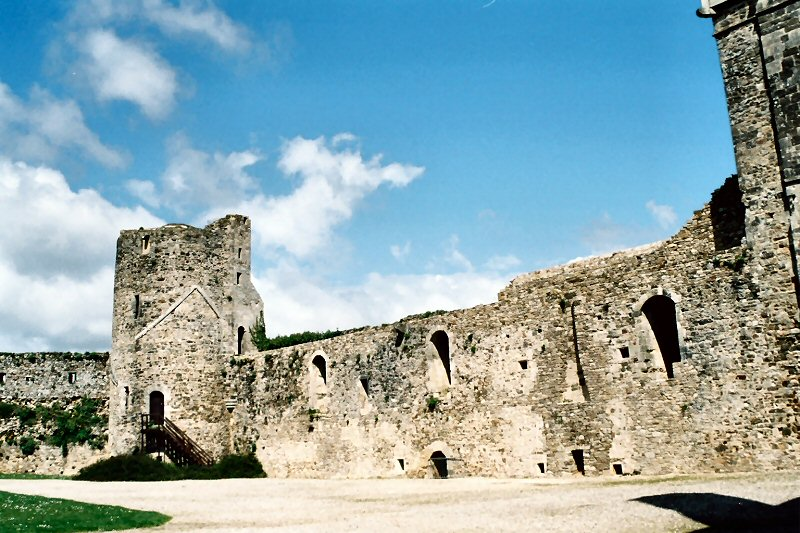
Saint-Sauveur-le Vicomte (stronghold)

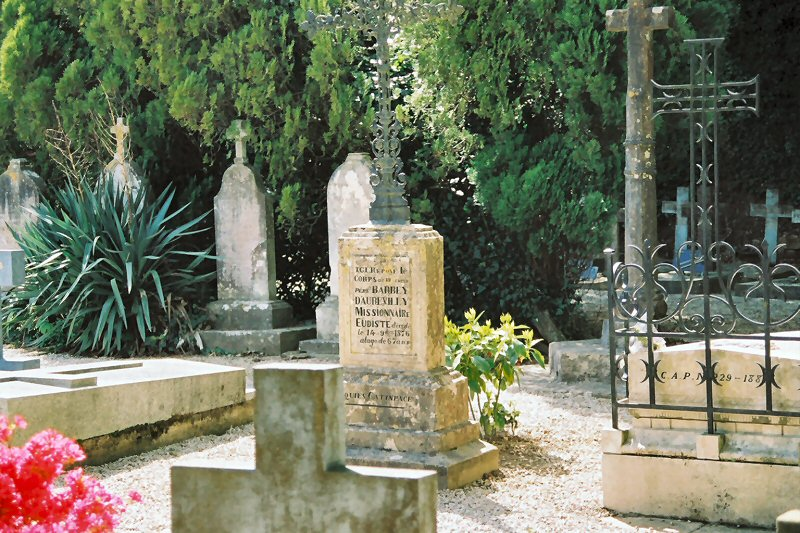
Saint-Sauveur-le Vicomte (cemetery)

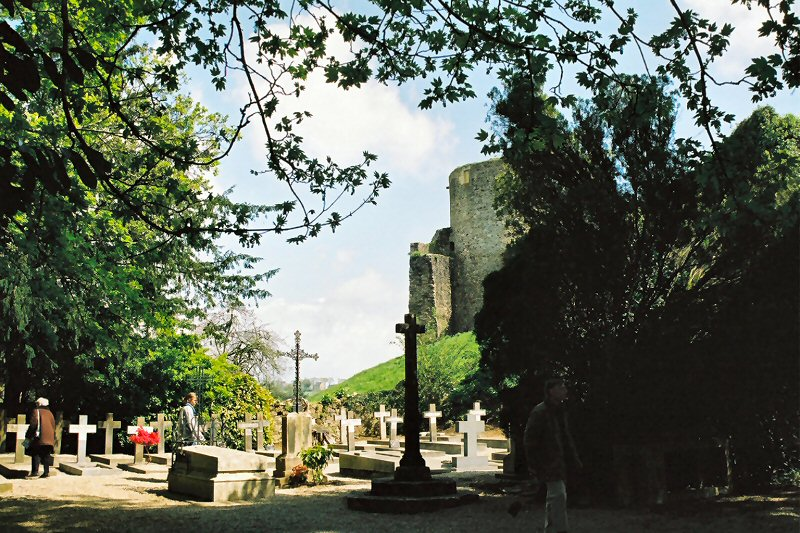
Saint-Sauveur-le Vicomte (cemetery)
