= Havill =

Family name

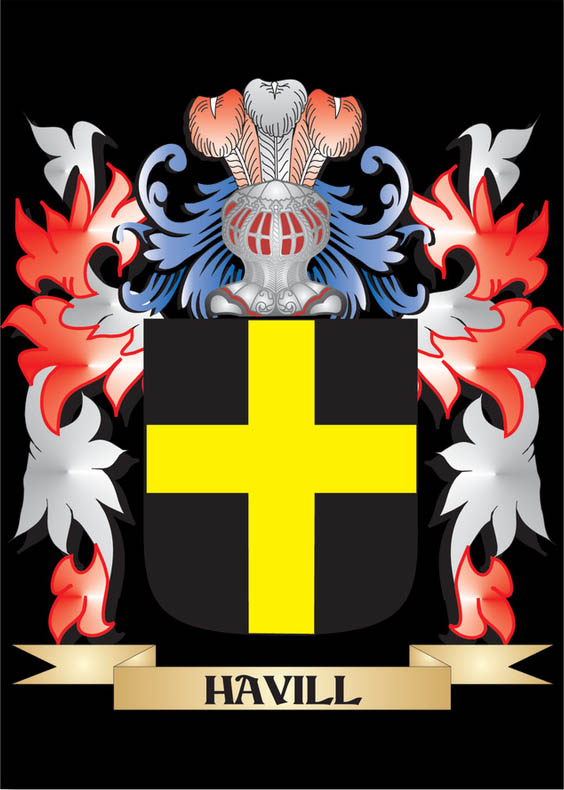
- Havill Coat of Arms
- Language: English, Norman

Other names
- Variant forms: de Hauteville, Hauville, Haville, Havell, Hovell, Hovel
- Derived: Hauteville

Havill is a habitational surname of Anglo-Norman origin. The family descends from Cotentin settlers of the Hauteville family, who arrived with the Norman Conquest and were rewarded with large land grants. Historically, the name has been most prevalent in the South West of England.

== History and etymology ==
The name originates from several Norman communes, including Héauville in the Manche department, Hauville in the Eure department, and Hauteville-la-Guichard in the Manche department, which lend their name from Hialtt, a 10th-century Norseman who founded the estate of Hialtus villa, giving rise in corrupted form to the family toponymic Hauteville. The name represents the Scandinavian Hjalti or Hialti, but may instead have resulted from confusion with the Helt[us] found in Heltvilla, modern Héauville. Alternatively, the eponymous Hiallt may be legendary: Hauteville (Altavilla) means simply "high estate".

Of the Hauteville family, the first well-known member is Tancred of Hauteville, a minor baron of Normandy. According to Goffredo Malaterra's chronicle, Aubrey or Alverardus, the fourth son by Tancred's second wife, remained behind in Normandy. About the time of the Domesday Book in 1086, a certain Alverardus or Aluericus Hautville is mentioned as having previously held lands in Compton Martin, Somerset, England. His kinsman Ralf de Hauville is mentioned in the Domesday Book as a tenant-in-chief in Burbage and Wolfhall in Wiltshire. Alverardus most probably founded the Somerset Hautevilles, and Ralf the Wiltshire/Berkshire Hauvilles. The name is found in every conceivable form in early registers, with Havill, Hautville, Hauvile, Hauvill, Hauville, Hauvyle, Havele, Havell, Havile, and Haville being the commonest.

== Distribution ==
Today, the surname is found most frequently in the United Kingdom and United States, with the highest density found in New Zealand. Within the United Kingdom, it is found predominantly in the West Country and Devon.

== Notable people ==
- Adrian Havill (born 1940), American author and journalist
- Andrew Havill (born 1965), English actor
- Clinton H. Havill (1892–1953), American naval officer and aerospace engineer
- Frederick Havill (1815–1884), English artist and portrait painter
- Joan Havill, New Zealand pianist and professor
- Juanita Havill (born 1949), American author
- Nathan Havill (born 1972), American entomologist and evolutionary biologist
- Philip Havill (born 1937), New Zealand first-class cricketer
- Reginald Havill Norman (1893–1973), Australian Army brigadier and ship-owner
- Steven F. Havill, American author

=== By marriage ===
- Sir Alfred Dyer (1865–1947), British newspaper editor, politician, and company director
- Anthony Herschel Hill (1939–2016), English composer, musician, and professor of music
