= Bag Limit =

2001 novel by Steven F. Havill

- First edition
- Author: Steven F. Havill
- Language: English
- Series: Bill Gastner #9
- Genre: Crime novel
- Publisher: St. Martin's Press
- Publication date: 17 November 2001
- Publication place: United States
- Media type: Print (hardback)
- Pages: 336 pp
- ISBN: 0-312-25183-1
- OCLC: 47237670
- Dewey Decimal: 813/.54 21
- LC Class: PS3558.A785 B34 2001
- Preceded by: Dead Weight
- Followed by: Scavengers

Bag Limit is a mystery novel written by Steven F. Havill, published in 2001. It was the last of nine crime novels featuring Bill Gastner, the reluctant sheriff of Posados County, who had previously appeared in Dead Weight (2000).

== Synopsis ==
The book features Sheriff Bill Gastner, who hopes his final days in office will be uneventful. Instead a local 17-year-old named Matt Baca drives drunkenly into his cruiser. Baca stumbles drunkenly into the night as Gastner confronts him. Baca is arrested while passed out at his home. After kicking open Gastner's temporary cruiser's window, he is transferred to a local Border Patrol unit. The transfer turns fatal when Baca pushes himself away, into a delivery truck's path. The plot thickens as the dead teen's father is found dead in his kitchen the next morning. This brings Gastner a confusing set of clues that lead him to why Baca kept fighting his arrest, where he obtained his fake I.D., and who was involved in the struggle with Baca's father leading to his death.

== Reception ==
A review of Bag Limit in Publishers Weekly said, "Unfortunately, crime fans with even the slightest taste for action are going to be fidgeting after the first hundred sluggish pages."
