= James Sherlock =

- Occupations: Conductor, Pianist
- Website: www.jamessherlock.me

James Sherlock (born Rudgwick, West Sussex) is a musician of British and Irish ancestry.

Sherlock studied with Kevin Smith, continuing at Chetham's School of Music in Manchester and Eton College. He read music at Trinity College, Cambridge, where he was organ scholar. He continued music studies at the Guildhall School of Music & Drama with Joan Havill and conducting at the Sibelius Academy with Sakari Oramo and Jorma Panula.

Beginning his career as a pianist and specialist with early keyboards, since 2018 Sherlock has conducted many orchestras across Northern Europe and was for several years a permanent guest conductor with the English Chamber Orchestra. He has accompanied numerous international vocal artists. His Carnegie Hall debut was in January 2014.

In November 2016, Sherlock was the victim of a street attack in London. The injuries from the assault required reconstructive facial surgery.

== Discography ==
- Fauré: Requiem, with the London Symphony Orchestra, (Gramophone Editor's choice)
- What Sweeter Music: Music for Christmas, with English Chamber Orchestra and Tenebrae choir
- 'The Call of Wisdom': music of Will Todd, with English Chamber Orchestra and Tenebrae choir
- Poulenc: Figure humaine with Tenebrae choir
- A Walk with Ivor Gurney, with Aurora Orchestra and Dame Sarah Connolly
- Winterreise, with Angelika Kirchschlager
- Rachmaninov Symphonic Dances for two pianos (with Graeme Mitchison)
- Complete Mixed-voice works of Benjamin Britten, with the NYCGB
