= Frederick Havill =

English artist and portrait painter

- Born: c. 1815; Exeter, England
- Died: April 1884 (aged 68–69); Kensington and Chelsea, London, England
- Burial place: Kensington and Chelsea, London, England
- Occupations: Artist; portrait painter
- Years active: 1849–1884
- Era: 19th century Romanticism
- Notable work: Portrait of David Livingstone; Portrait of John Glanville Hawker
- Spouse: Catherine Elizabeth Humphreys (m. 1865; died 1884)
- Family: Havill family

Frederick Havill (c. 1815 – April 1884) was an English artist during the 19th century. Havill contributed to multiple mediums, but is best remembered for his role in portraiture and for being a founding member of the modern English school of watercolour.

== Career ==
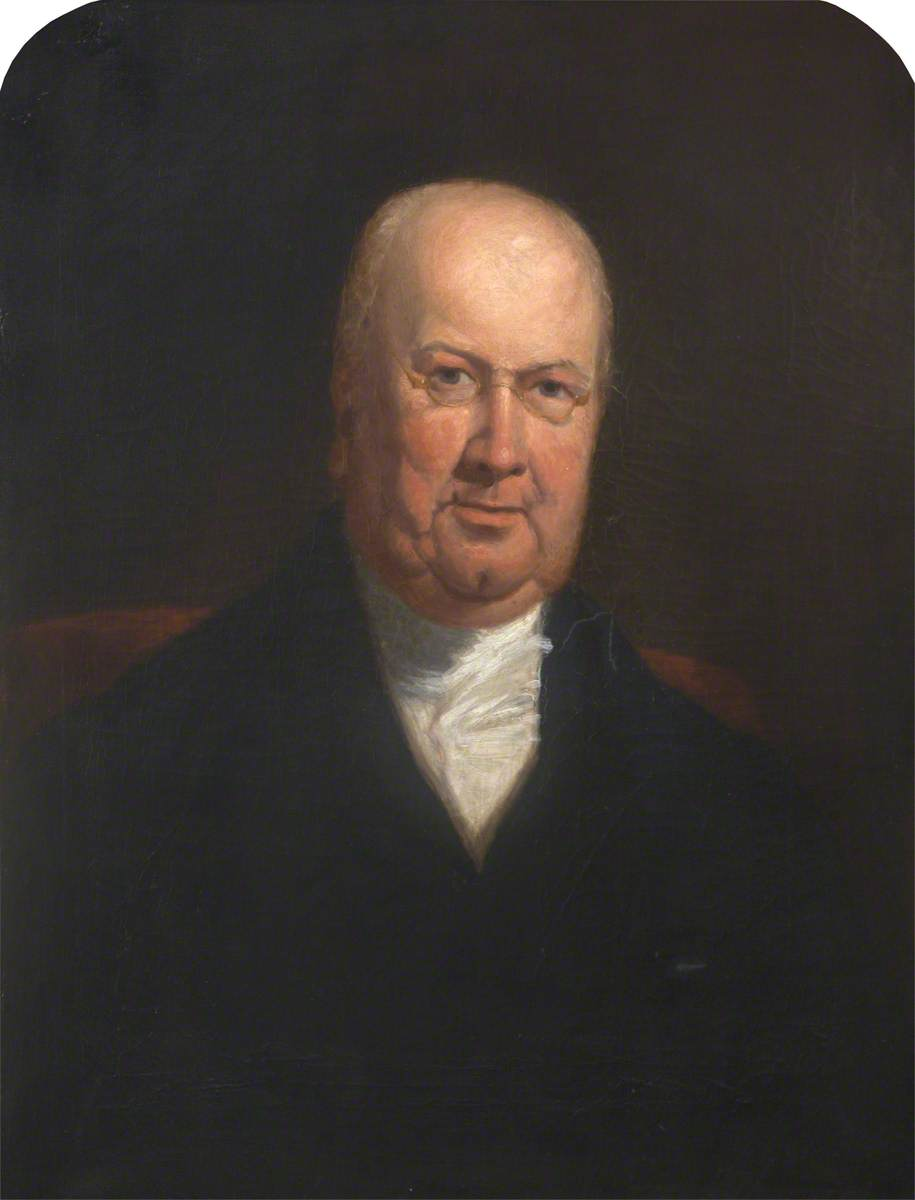
Frederick Havill's Portrait of John Glanville Hawker

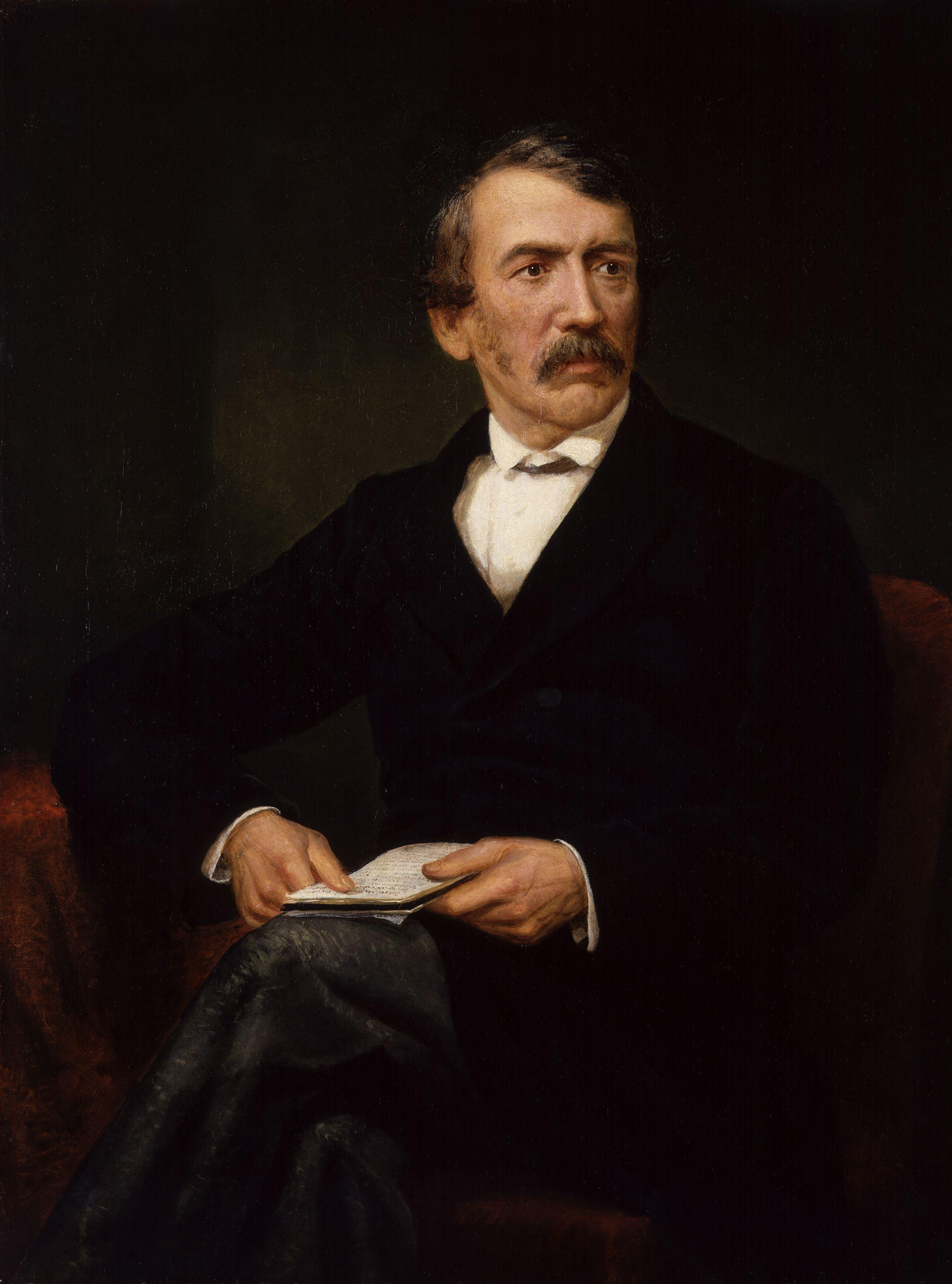
Frederick Havill's posthumous Portrait of David Livingstone

During the 1840s, Havill began his most active period leading to his showing at the Royal Academy of Arts in 1849 and continuing through to 1874, where he exhibited chiefly.

Following the death of his first wife and subsequent remarriage in 1865, Havill moved to London from Cheltenham, establishing his household in Chelsea until his death in 1884.

Within the art world of the 19th century, Havill is recognised as a "founder of the water colour school", as described by Huntley Carter in The New Age. His most prestigious work is housed in the National Portrait Gallery, including his posthumous portrait of the Scottish physician and pioneer missionary David Livingstone, an oil on canvas donated by John Lillie in 1896. Some is also held in the John and Mable Ringling Museum of Art.

Havill's work has been offered at auction many times, with prices ranging from $500 to $2,375 depending on the size and medium of the artwork. The Astrologer sold for $2,375 at Bonhams in San Francisco in 2013.

== Personal life ==
Havill married twice. With his first wife, Elizabeth, he had his only child Lucy Elizabeth in 1842, though she died in 1858. Elizabeth, too, died and Havill married Catherine Elizabeth Humphreys in 1865 in Kensington, London.

== List of selected works ==
- Portrait of John Glanville Hawker (1845)
- Portrait of Captain George Schreiber (1854)
- The Astrologer (1854)
- Portrait of David Livingstone (c.1873)
- The Decision of Edward I, King of England
