= Greg Scott (violinist) =

British violinist

- Scott with his violin
- Born: Manchester
- Education: Chetham's School of Music, Royal Northern College of Music
- Occupation: Violinist
- Website: www.futurestart.co.uk/greg-scott

Greg Scott is a Manchester-based violinist and a protégé of Pete Waterman. His first album, Duel, reached number one in the UK Classical Artist Albums Chart.

== Education ==
Scott graduated from Chetham's School of Music and then from Royal Northern College of Music.

== Career ==
Scott started his music career performing as a violinist at the BBC Philharmonic Orchestra. He came to wider attention after meeting the record producer Pete Waterman, who spotted him busking in Manchester with fellow student Craig Owen and signed the pair to Decca as the duo Duel. Scott went on to perform at London's Royal Albert Hall.

Scott was a member of The National Youth Orchestra of Great Britain and has performed as a soloist with Bryan Ferry and KD lang.

Women’s magazine Company ranked Scott among the 50 most eligible bachelors in Britain.

His performances and recordings have been covered by publications including The Irish Times and the South China Morning Post.
