= English Chamber Orchestra =

British symphony orchestra

- Orchestra
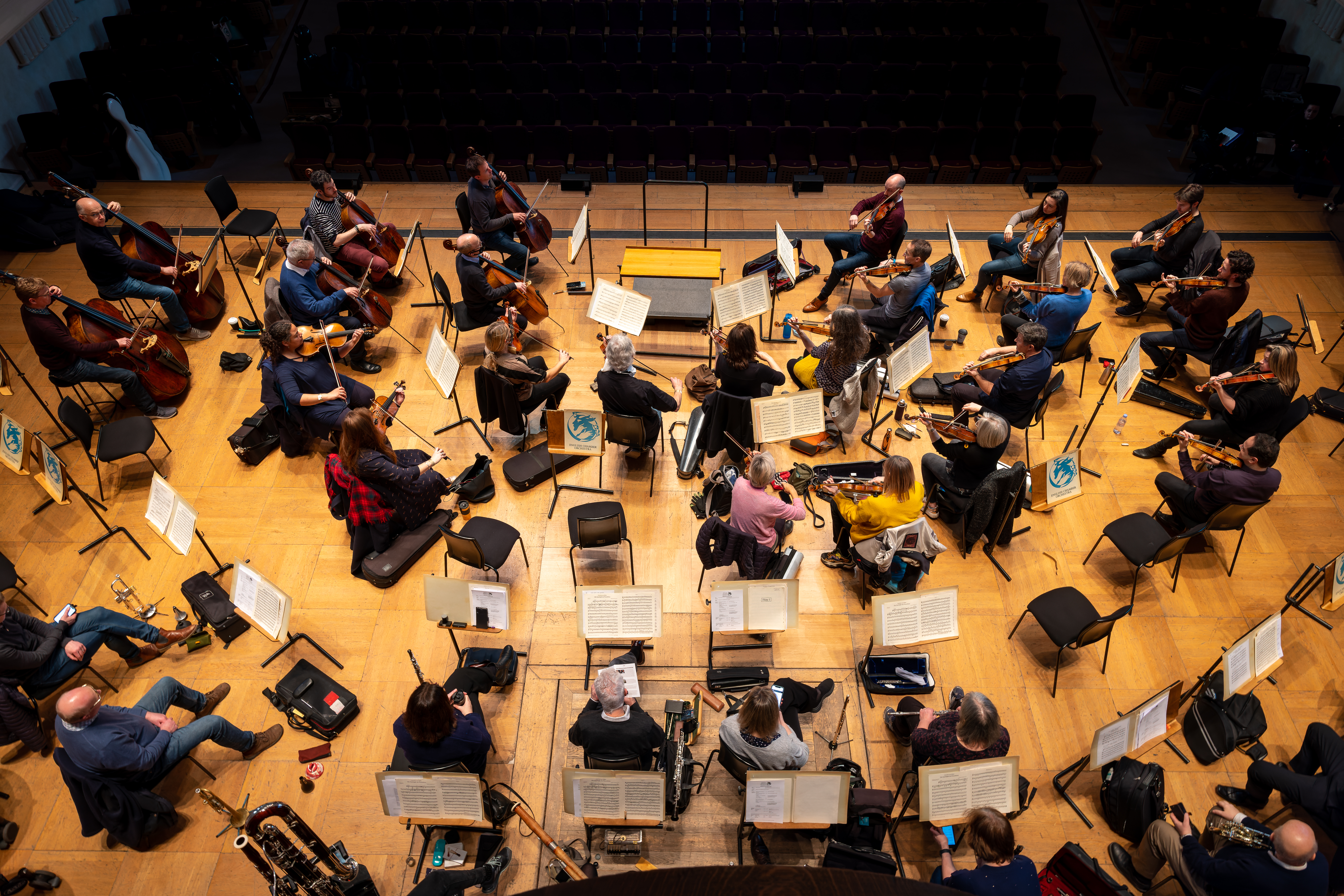
- Founded: 1948
- Concert hall: Cadogan Hall, Wigmore Hall
- Music director: Stephanie Gonley
- Website: www.englishchamberorchestra.co.uk

The English Chamber Orchestra (ECO) is a British chamber orchestra based in London. The full orchestra regularly plays concerts at Cadogan Hall, and their ensemble performs at Wigmore Hall.

== History ==
The English Chamber Orchestra has its origins in the Goldsbrough Orchestra, founded in 1948 by Lawrence Leonard and Arnold Goldsbrough. The name was considered to prevent success outside of the UK and in 1960 it was changed to the English Chamber Orchestra, when Quintin Ballardie (a principal violinist with the original orchestra) invited Dr. Ursula Jones-Strebi to found and co-manage the new orchestra, where they also expanded its repertoire beyond the Baroque period for the first time. Its repertoire remained limited by the group's size, which has stayed fairly consistently at around the size of an orchestra of Mozart's time.

Shortly afterwards, it became closely associated with the Aldeburgh Festival, playing in the premieres of Benjamin Britten's A Midsummer Night's Dream (1960), Owen Wingrave (1970), Curlew River and several other of his works. The occasions on which Britten conducted the orchestra included the opening concerts of the Queen Elizabeth Hall and Snape Maltings in 1967. He also made a number of records with the group.

The BBC1 classical music television series Masterworks Bach began on 28 December 1966 from Southwark Cathedral with the Academy of St Martin in the Fields. The second programme in this series was on Wednesday 11 January 1967 at 22.55, in a series of five programmes, with this programme featuring the orchestra, with William Bennett (flautist), Peter Graeme (oboe), and David Mason (trumpeter) at Guildford Cathedral; it was produced by Antony Craxton (1918-99), the son of composer Harold Craxton and brother of oboist Janet Craxton; this programme was watched by Paul McCartney, who liked the piccolo trumpet section, and on 17 January 1967 this was recorded for Penny Lane.

The orchestra did not at this time have a principal conductor but worked closely with a succession of guest conductors including Raymond Leppard, Colin Davis and Daniel Barenboim. In 1985, Jeffrey Tate was appointed the ensemble's first principal conductor. In 2000, Ralf Gothóni was appointed second principal conductor.

In June 2009, the English Chamber Orchestra named Paul Watkins its new music director, effective with the 2009–2010 season, for an initial contract of three years. The orchestra has also worked regularly with guest conductors Paul Goodwin, Lawrence Power and James Sherlock. In 2023, the orchestra appointed Roberto Forés Veses as Principal Guest Conductor. Having led the orchestra for over 30 years, Stephanie Gonley was recognised as Leader and Principal of the English Chamber Orchestra in 2023.

King Charles III has been patron of the orchestra since 1977.
