= Gareth Owen (pianist) =

British classical pianist

Gareth Owen is a British classical pianist. He was the head of piano at Eton College and is a professor of piano at several other musical institutions in England.

== Education and career ==
Born in Dyffryn Ardudwy in North Wales, Owen studied at Chetham's School of Music with Polish musician Alicja Fiderkiewicz, and at the Guildhall School of Music and Drama with concert pianist Joan Havill. At the Guildhall School, Owen won the Leszeck Dessnet Chopin Prize for his outstanding performance, and the Premier Prix at his graduation in 2000. He later attended the Verbier Academy in Switzerland.

Owen has performed both as a chamber musician and soloist, most notably at London's Wigmore Hall and the Mozart Hall in Zaragoza. He has since taken up several senior professorships at schools in England, including at Eton College, where he heads the piano department, and also at Charterhouse School in Godalming, St John's School in Leatherhead, and the Guildhall School of Music and Drama in London.
