= Chetham's School of Music =

Private school in Manchester, England

Coordinates: 53°29′10″N 2°14′36″W

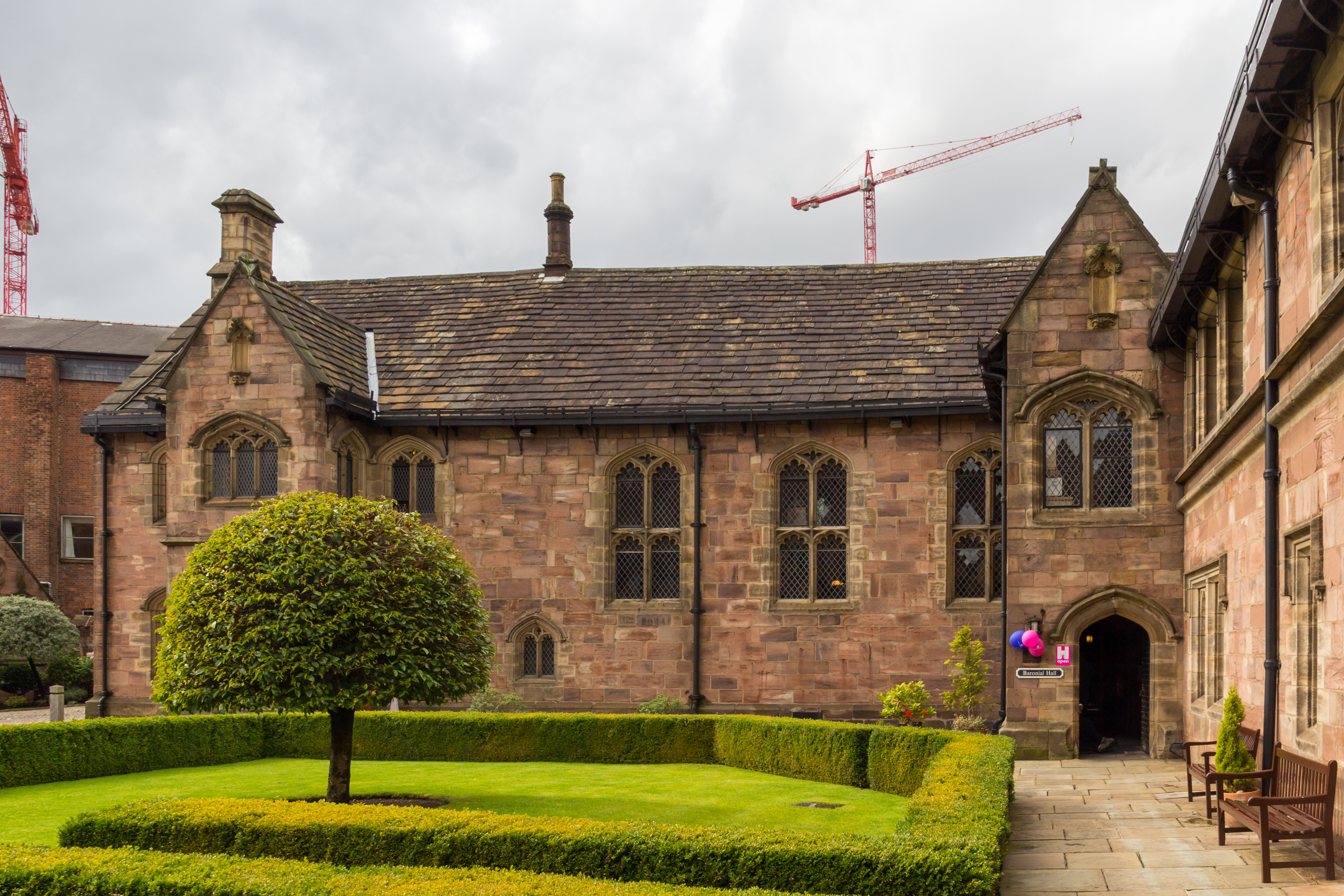
- Main courtyard

Location
- Long Millgate; Manchester, Greater Manchester, M3 1SB; England

Information
- Type: Private school
- Established: 1969
- Local authority: Manchester
- Specialist: Music
- Department for Education URN: 105588 Tables
- Chair of Governors: Malcolm Edge
- Head: Tom Redmond and Nicola Smith
- Gender: Mixed
- Age: 8 to 18
- Enrolment: 290
- Houses: Victoria House (Ages 8-13), Millgate Residence (Boys aged 13-18) and New College House (Girls aged 13-18)
- Website: http://chethamsschoolofmusic.com

Chetham's School of Music (/ˈtʃɛtəmz/) is a private co-educational boarding and day music school in Manchester, England. Chetham's educates pupils between the ages of 8 and 18, all of whom enter via musical auditions.

The music school was established in 1969 from Chetham's Hospital School, founded as a charity school by Humphrey Chetham in 1653. After becoming a boys' grammar school in 1952, the school turned to music as its speciality, at the same time becoming a private school and accepting its first female students. There are approximately 300 students on roll, including a large sixth form making up around half of the school. Approximately two-thirds of students board on site, with others travelling in as day students from around Greater Manchester. The oldest parts of the school date to the 1420s, when the building was constructed as a residence for priests of the church which is now Manchester Cathedral. These parts are listed buildings housing Chetham's Library.

Academic and music teaching moved into a new, building in 2012; this replaced the Victorian Palatine building and allowed easier access for concert visitors. A 482-seat concert hall, Stoller Hall, opened within the New School Building in 2017.

== History ==
=== Beginnings ===
The school is built on the site of Manchester Castle, a fortified manor house owned by the Grelleys after the Norman Conquest, at the confluence of the River Irwell and the River Irk. Medieval Manchester grew around the manor house and the parish church, which eventually became Manchester Cathedral.

In the early 14th century, the de la Warre family acquired the land through marriage. Thomas de la Warre refounded the church as a collegiate church in 1421. De la Warre gave the site of his manor house for the construction of a college, where eight priests, four clerks and six lay choristers lived in the care of a warden. It is likely that building began between 1424 and 1429, and the main hall and cloister rooms finished by 1458. It remains the most complete building of its kind in the country, and at the time of its construction, was the second largest building in Manchester, surpassed only by the church.

The college was dissolved during the English Reformation in 1547, and purchased by Edward Stanley, 3rd Earl of Derby. It was re-founded by Queen Mary, before Elizabeth I refounded it as 'Christ's College' in 1578. This arrangement lasted until the foundation of Manchester Cathedral in 1847. The college buildings remained the property of the Stanleys, and wardens (including the Elizabethan astronomer and mathematician John Dee) lived on the premises with their families and servants. During the English Civil War, the college was used as a gunpowder factory and a prison and was left damaged by powder, disused and overrun by pigs. Lord James Stanley, a Cavalier, was executed in 1651, and Parliament confiscated his property, including the college.

=== Humphrey Chetham ===
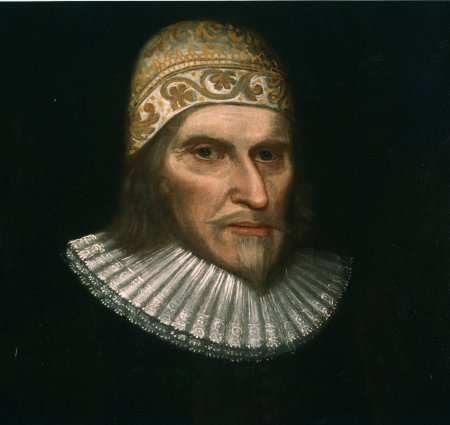
Humphrey Chetham, by an unknown artist, painted after his death

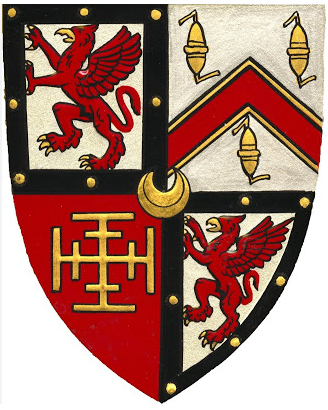
Chetham's coat of arms, formerly used as the school's emblem

Humphrey Chetham was an unmarried and childless financier, philanthropist and cloth merchant from Manchester. In the 1640s he provided money for the maintenance and education of fourteen poor boys from Manchester, six from Salford, and two from Droylsden. In March 1649 he wrote to the Earl of Derby about his intention to establish a school. He attempted unsuccessfully to acquire the buildings, which were "spoyld and ruin'd and become like a dunghill", to provide a hospital, school and library. In his will, Chetham left over £8,000 from his estate (which was worth about £14,000 in total) to establish a hospital school for 40 poor local boys, between the ages of six and ten and from "honest" families, who should be taught and cared for until they were 14. His executors obtained the lease of the college in 1654 to house both the school and library.

=== Charity school ===
After repairs to the college were completed in mid-1656, the first admissions were made. The first headmaster, Richard Dutton, was appointed in 1655, and in 1665 the institution became an incorporated charity. The number of pupils grew, with admissions rising to 100 by the 1870s. Boys were admitted based on the parish they lived in, and on need, health and background of the family. Illegitimate boys were not admitted, and all boys had to be able to read to a certain standard that meant they were not hard to teach. In 1878, a new schoolroom designed by architect Alfred Waterhouse (who designed Manchester Town Hall) was built in a Tudor style. The number of boys admitted was reduced to 75 in 1908 to save money, though three years later admissions increased again to 99. In 1916, no boys were admitted due to lack of funding caused by World War I, and in 1918 the number was limited to 70. Successful public appeals resulted in the numbers rising to 97 in 1929. In 1926 a scheme was set up which allowed boys to apply for scholarships to join a grammar school, which meant that while they lived at Chetham's, they were educated elsewhere during the day. Further, they would stay at grammar school until at least the age of 16 and sometimes 18.

=== World War II and aftermath: 1939 to 1952 ===
During World War II, the boys were evacuated to the seaside town of Cleveleys, Lancashire, where they shared accommodation with a primary school. Chetham's was damaged by an explosion in December 1940, when most of the windows were shattered and the roof set alight. The boys relocated to Chapel-en-le-Frith, Derbyshire, in 1943, although thirteen boys attending grammar school moved to Buxton College. By 1944 the governors believed that it would not be appropriate for the school to return to Manchester, and it was proposed the site become a religious education centre. However, after years of discussion, it was decided to return the school to Manchester. The Education Act 1944, which stipulated that schools should be classified as primary or secondary, complicated matters, since Chetham's went across the middle. It was decided in 1950 that Chetham's should become a grammar school, and this change took place two years later. In 1950, Chetham's amalgamated with Nicholls' Hospital School, a similar school based in Ardwick which had been established in 1863. While it could take up to 100 boys, by the end of the war there were only 22 and it was considered beneficial for the schools to merge.

=== Later history: since 1952 ===
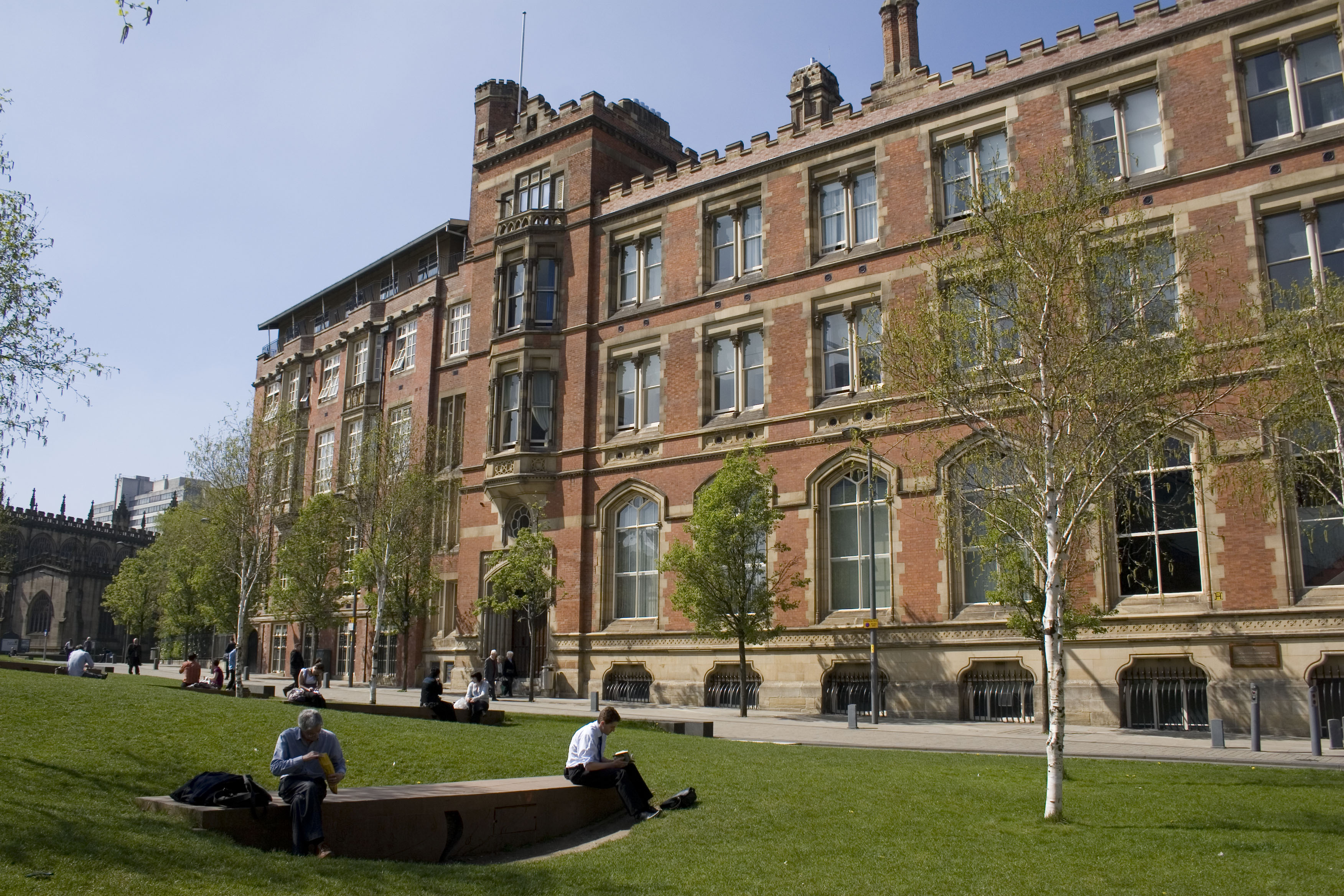
Millgate building, parallel to Long Millgate, is the former Manchester Grammar School, and became part of Chetham's in 1978. It currently accommodates two boarding houses, a dining room, school gym, and academic classrooms. It is a Grade II listed building.

After the change in organisation, Chetham's could no longer afford to provide education based on scholarships and other allowances, and began charging fees. In 1952, the school buildings were considered insufficient so a new block was built, it is currently known as the Nicholls Building and opened in 1955. By 1960 the numbers of boys admitted had increased significantly, particularly among day pupils; 230 non-boarding students attended that year, alongside 64 boarders.

Before becoming a specialist school, Chetham's had a good reputation for music, and on this basis the decision was made to become a co-educational music school in 1969. The former Palatine Hotel, which housed offices and shops, was converted into extra teaching space and practice rooms. In 1969, 50 students were admitted based on musical potential and by 1972 this had risen to 150, more than half of the entire school. In 1977 the school changed to its present name. In 1978 the Long Millgate building, the original home of Manchester Grammar School, was purchased to provide additional space to the campus. Also included with the building was The Whiteley Hall, a 200-seat central performance space which became the primary venue of Chetham's concerts until 2017.

New College House, a boarding house for girls at Chetham's, was opened by Queen Elizabeth II in 1994. The boarding capacity at the school was further increased following an extension to the Nicholls Building in 2004. In 2012, a new school building adjacent to the existing site, purpose-designed for music teaching, was opened by the Earl of Wessex (Patron of the school). This included The Carole Nash Hall, a 100-seat recital hall, and space for a 400-seat concert hall, which would later open in 2017 as The Stoller Hall. The Long Millgate building continues to be used as a boarding house for students, as well as a dining space, a school gym and currently houses the school's art department. The Palatine Building was demolished in 2016 to reveal the previously hidden medieval buildings and allow easier access to the library.

In June 2021, a fire broke out within the Long Millgate building, beginning at approximately 2.20am within The Whiteley Hall. The adjacent student boarding houses, Millgate House and Victoria House, were reported to have been successfully evacuated with no harm caused to either the students or staff. Fire crews reportedly arrived immediately on the scene and contained the blaze, however the incident caused substantial damage to The Whiteley Hall itself, including the main stage and a pipe organ originally installed in 2002. The school gym on the lower levels also suffered water damage.

=== Historical abuse allegations and convictions (2013 onwards) ===
In February 2013, Michael Brewer, Director of Music from the late 1970s to the early 1990s, and his ex-wife, were convicted of indecently assaulting a pupil, Frances Andrade, between 1978 and 1982. Andrade committed suicide after giving evidence at their trial. Prosecutors claimed Brewer was forced to resign in the 1990s after an inappropriate relationship with a 16-year-old girl. The school's statement said the current staff were "shocked ... to the core" by the revelations of "the most appalling acts which took place during his time at the school ..." In March 2013, Brewer was found guilty of indecent assault and sentenced to six years imprisonment.

It was reported that allegations of assault were made against another teacher in the 1980s. On 12 February, Malcolm Layfield, Head of Strings at the Royal Northern College of Music resigned from the RNCM Board after claims of his previous sexual misconduct were brought up during the Brewer hearing. Before his appointment at RNCM, Layfield had admitted to having relationships with six Chetham's pupils aged between 16 and 18 whilst he taught there. Two RNCM teachers, including the Head of Keyboard Studies, Martin Roscoe, resigned in protest at his appointment in 2002. In October 2013 Layfield was arrested on suspicion of raping and indecently assaulting an 18-year-old woman between 1988 and 1999, but was found not guilty at a trial in 2015.

On 14 February 2013, Wen Zhou Li, a violin teacher at the Royal Northern College of Music and former teacher at Chetham's, was arrested on charges of rape that allegedly occurred whilst he taught at the school. The case was dropped in 2016 before coming to trial, and Wen Zhou Li was told that he left court "without a stain on his character". Allegations of sexual abuse were also made against the pianist Ryszard Bakst, who died in 1999, and former violin teacher Christopher Ling. Ling, who had moved to Los Angeles in the 1990s, shot himself at his home when US marshals arrived in September 2015 with a provisional arrest warrant.

On 8 May 2013, the Greater Manchester Police reported that over 30 women had reported incidents of abuse relating to the school. The investigation into allegations of abuse made against individuals said by police to "have or have had connections with either Chetham's and/or Royal Northern College of Music and/or have taught music privately", was known as Operation Kiso. Thirty-nine individuals were named and 10 of these proactively investigated; the school stated that it was assisting the police with their inquiries, and had instigated an action plan to review their safeguarding processes and procedures. In 2013, two independent reports found that school "failed to follow its own guidelines to keep children safe. They also discovered that no formal, minuted meetings had taken place at the school to discuss the recent allegations and consider changes to its child protection policy."

Between September and October 2019, Chetham’s School of Music gave evidence to the Independent Inquiry into Child Sexual Abuse, after applying as a core participant along with four other residential music schools. In a statement from Chetham's, Alun Jones, the principal in 2019 commented, “I welcome this Inquiry. Victims and survivors of child sexual abuse need to know that they are being listened to and that changes happen as a result of what they say. As Principal of Chetham’s I have a duty of care to our current and future students to make sure we also do everything possible to learn from victims and survivors’ experiences.”

In March 2022, the Independent Inquiry into Child Sexual Abuse delivered its preliminary findings, which included damning statements about the conduct of senior staff at Chetham's School of Music, criticising a cultural reluctance to report serious safeguarding concerns, also seen across other participating schools within the inquiry. One such statement from the report read, "On occasion, when allegations of child sexual abuse arose, headteachers moved to protect the reputation of the school rather than the welfare of victims and other children at the school.". It concluded that the power and influence of its eminent music teachers at the time further compromised its pupils.

In October 2022, the Independent Inquiry into Child Sexual Abuse made 20 recommendations within its final report. In a statement, Chetham's School of Music said, "To the victims and survivors of abuse including their families and loved ones, we are truly sorry [...] [This] report confirms above all else that there is no room for complacency. As the report says ‘child sexual abuse is not a problem consigned to the past'. These mistakes must never be repeated, here or elsewhere. We therefore welcome all 20 recommendations in the report. [...] “None of this work can undo past failures, and our apologies will never be enough, but we will do everything in our power to ensure that young people across the UK today are safe and protected.”

== Academics and pastoral care ==
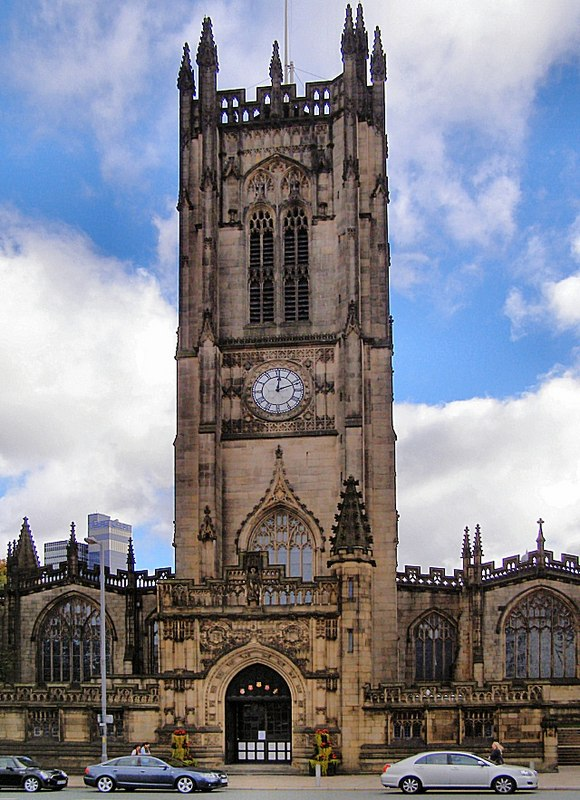
Manchester Cathedral has been associated with Chetham's since its beginning, when it was a church and the school was built as accommodation for its priests, choristers and clerks.

=== Admissions ===
Students are admitted to the school on musical ability and talent. Funding for up to 100% of study and boarding fees is available to most students through the UK Government's Music and Dance Scheme.

=== Curriculum ===
As a specialist music school, Chetham's requires all students to study a curriculum that concentrates on music and other subjects in accordance with the National Curriculum. Students taking GCSEs and A-levels study music. All students study at least two instruments and choir practice is compulsory.

Ensembles form an important part of the musical curriculum, with all students taking part in at least one. The ensembles include Chetham's Symphony Orchestra, which has performed on BBC Radio 3. The award-winning Big Band played an integral part in the creation of a Jazz Studies programme, and has won many prizes, including The Daily Telegraph Young Jazz Competition, and the junior section of the BBC Radio 2 Big Band of the Year Competition three times. The Chamber Choir has performed on Songs of Praise and the BBC Proms and the Symphonic Wind Band and Orchestra have won prizes at the Boosey and Hawkes National Concert Festival.

=== School life ===
Chetham's admits boarding and day students to one of three houses: Victoria House, a mixed-gender house for students aged 8–13; Millgate House, for boys aged 13–18; and New College House aged 13–18. In senior houses, boarding students usually share rooms for four people, and in the sixth form students either have single rooms or share with one other person. Students have a personal tutor to discuss their progress, and boarding students have a house parent who communicates with parents at home.

== Campus ==
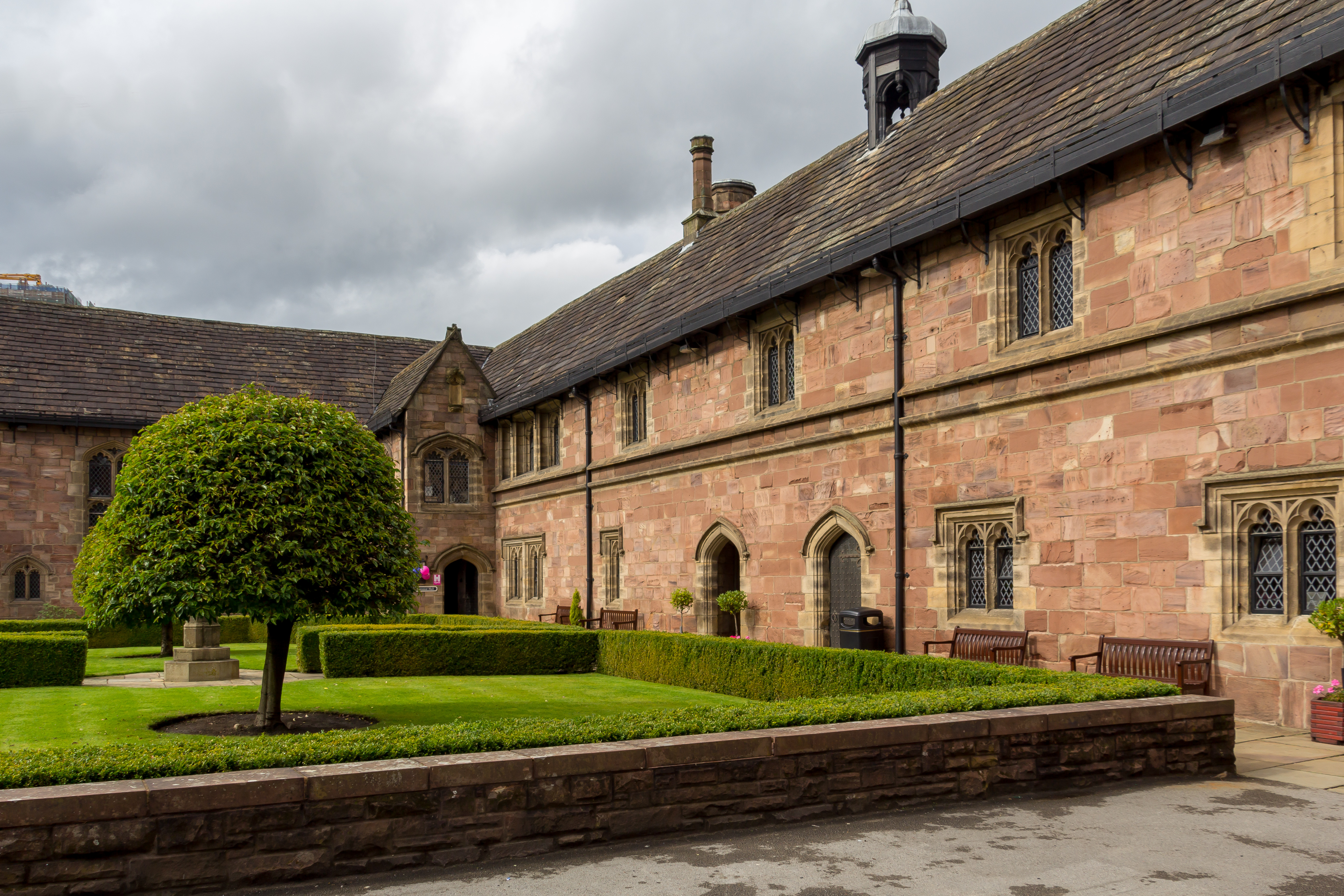
College House, the original 15th-century college. This building contains the library, hall, Audit Room, kitchen and offices.

Chetham's is situated in Manchester City Centre, close to Manchester Victoria railway station, The National Football Museum and Manchester Cathedral. There are several buildings on the site, many of which are listed. They surround a large open space, the north part is a car park and courtyard, and the south part is a playground.

=== College House ===
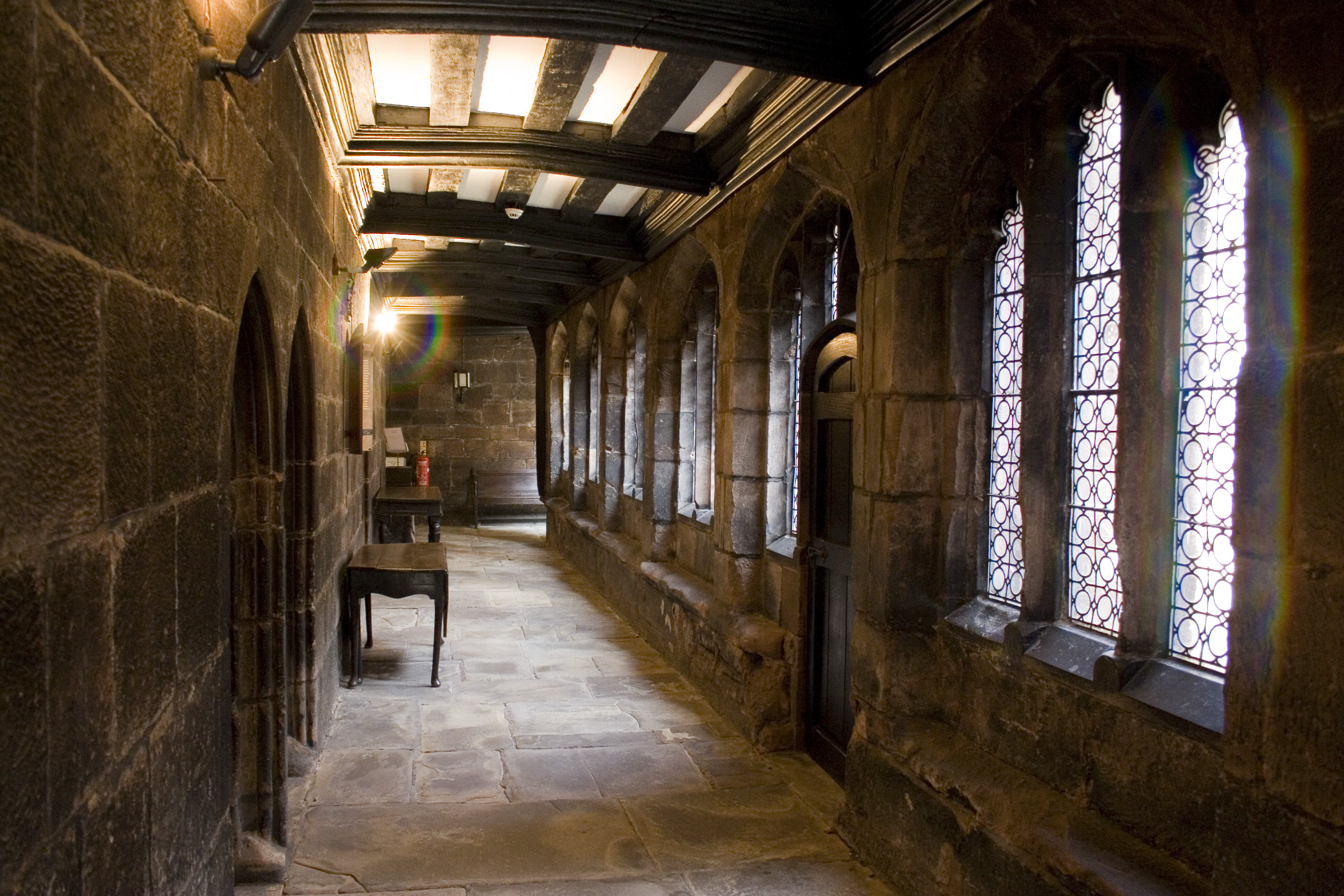
A walkway in the cloister range

College House, the original 15th-century college, is a Grade I listed building built of sandstone in the shape of a lowercase 'b' with a slate roof. It is accessed by the original gatehouse; which was constructed on a plinth and contains the original timbers. The upper storey is accessed by an external staircase. Baronial Hall, once the Great Hall, contains many of its original features, such as its timber roof, dais and canopy. There is a large fireplace dating from the 19th century, and three windows likely to date from the 16th century. The Audit Room, originally the day room for the Warden and later a common room, contains a panelled ceiling with decorations suggesting it was installed by the Stanley family. The upper room, originally the warden's chamber, is now the library Reading Room, and contains a large bay window within an elaborate Tudor arch, as well as original 17th-century doors. The west part of the building surrounding the cloister courtyard contained accommodation known as sets, for people who lived in college. There were two rooms in each set on two floors, the lower floor being used as a study. Historian Clare Hartwell, describes the cobbled courtyard which has a restored well as "one of the most atmospheric spaces in the building". It is surrounded by many windows, which were probably originally unglazed. There are many unusual features of daily life still preserved in the building, including medieval cat flaps. Inside there are several corridors and passages containing open beams and original stonework. To the east is the kitchen and associated rooms, and further east are rooms used for administration offices, most of which have been substantially altered.

=== New School Building and Stoller Hall ===
Constructed in 2012 opposite Manchester Victoria Station and connected by a bespoke link bridge to the original site at Chetham's, the New School Building contains most academic teaching rooms and all music teaching rooms across seven floors, as well as two performance spaces. The Carole Nash Hall is used regularly for recitals and masterclasses, including free Lunchtime Concerts which are open to the public three times each week during the school term. Its primary concert space, The Stoller Hall, was opened by Prince Edward, Earl of Wessex in 2017 and houses larger scale performances for audiences of up to 482. It was named after its chief benefactor Sir Norman Stoller, founder of The Stoller Charitable Trust.

=== Other buildings ===
The Millgate Building, the former site of Manchester Grammar School, is a Grade II listed building designed by Alfred Waterhouse in the 1870s. Attached to it is the Nicholls Building, which was originally built in 1955. Combined, they are known as The Long Millgate Buildings, which contain The Whiteley Hall, school gym, school kitchen and dining room, art department, and two student boarding houses. Following the opening of the New School Building in 2012, many of the old classrooms inside were repurposed and refurbished as student accommodation. A top-down extension of the Nicholls Building was completed in 2004, allowing for the construction of these additional boarding facilities. Originally purposed as sixth form accommodation, the Nicholls Building now only contains Victoria House for junior boarders.

The Waterhouse Building (formerly known as The Vallins Arts Centre) is another building on the site designed by Alfred Waterhouse in 1878. Waterhouse is Grade II listed and styled as a medieval chapel, it contains both upper and lower floor spaces often used as overflow classrooms, exam spaces and large rehearsal rooms. Waterhouse was responsible for much of the alterations made to College House in the 19th century, and so the building was renamed in recognition of this. It formerly housed the school's drama department until the late 2010's, when the department was relocated to the lower levels of College House. It has been speculated that this building could eventually be repurposed as a future visitors centre for the adjacent Chetham's Library.

New College House is the third boarding house and was opened by HM Queen Elizabeth II in 1994. Located adjacent to what is now the National Football Museum and Cathedral Gardens, it was originally purpose-built as the Girls' House. It now houses both middle and sixth form students, complete with its own sixth form common room.

A small section of the former Palatine Building (demolished in 2016) also remains at the disused South Gate entrance adjacent to Manchester Cathedral and The Glade of Light Memorial. This section remains due to Grade I restrictions in relation to the medieval outer walls at Chetham's.

== Notable alumni ==
Chetham's, as a music school, has produced many notable alumni. Many of its students become professional musicians, as well as conductors, teachers and actors. This is a partial list of alumni:

- Max Beesley – actor
- Olivia Chaney – folk singer
- Jiafeng Chen – violinist
- Gareth Owen – classical pianist
- Gary Cooper – harpsichordist, fortepianist, and conductor
- Thangam Debbonaire – Labour MP
- Peter Donohoe – pianist
- Richard Egarr – conductor and harpsichord performer, music director of the Academy of Ancient Music
- Daniel Harding – conductor
- David Hill – choral director
- Stephen Hough – pianist
- Guy Johnston – cellist
- Paul Lewis – pianist
- Mike Lindup – rock musician (Level 42)
- Grant Llewellyn – conductor
- Leon McCawley – pianist
- Kevin Mallon conductor and violinist
- Murray McLachlan – pianist
- Anna Markland – pianist
- Wayne Marshall – pianist, organist and conductor
- Doug Naylor – writer of Red Dwarf
- Jennifer Pike – violinist
- Robert Plane – clarinettist
- Emily Roberts - lead guitar Last Dinner Party
- Matthew Schellhorn – pianist
- Greg Scott – violinist
- Dominic Seldis – double bassist
- Sam Shepherd aka Floating Points – electronic musician
- Gwilym Simcock – jazz pianist, composer
- Nicholas Simpson, composer
- Albert Cano Smit – pianist
- Iyad Sughayer – pianist
- David Thornton – euphonium player
- Adam Walker – flautist
- Andrew Wilde – pianist
- Roger Wright – former director BBC Proms, Chief Executive of Aldeburgh Music

== See also ==
- Grade I listed buildings in Greater Manchester
- Listed buildings in Manchester-M3
