= Philip Havill =

New Zealand cricketer

Personal information
- Full name: Philip John Havill
- Born: 8 April 1937 (age 89); Papatoetoe, New Zealand
- Relatives: Joan Havill (cousin)
- Source: Cricinfo, 1 November 2020

Philip John Havill (born 8 April 1937) is a New Zealand cricketer. He played in two first-class matches for Northern Districts in 1969/70.

A right-arm medium-pace bowler and left-handed lower-order batsman, Havill also played Hawke Cup cricket for Franklin. He was the first Franklin player to represent Northern Districts.

== See also ==
- List of Northern Districts representative cricketers
