= Héauville =

- Commune
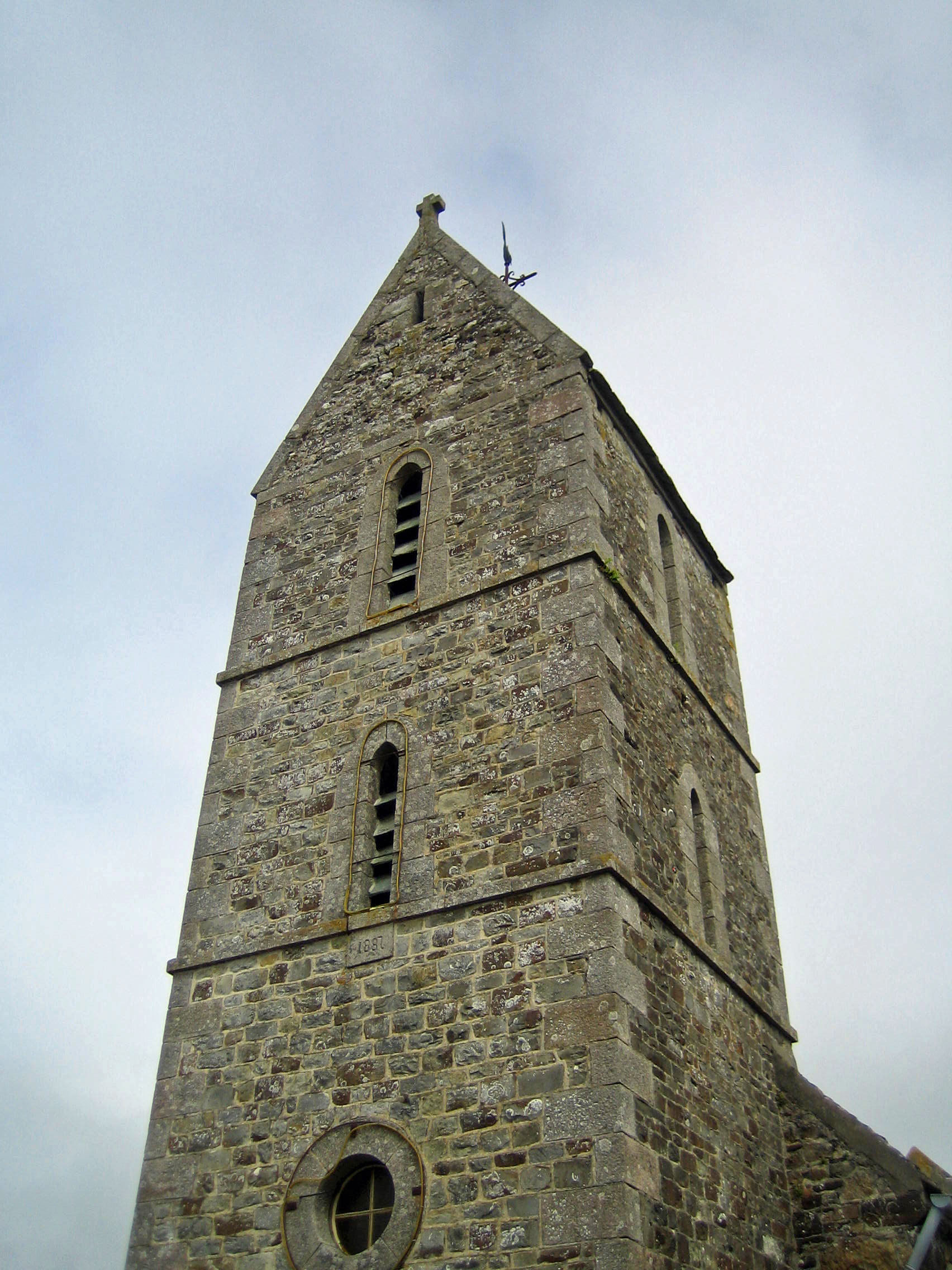
- The church of Saint-Germain
- Location of Héauville
- Location within France Location within Normandy
- Coordinates: 49°34′55″N 1°47′56″W
- Country: France
- Region: Normandy
- Department: Manche
- Arrondissement: Cherbourg
- Canton: Les Pieux
- Intercommunality: CA Cotentin

Government
  - Mayor (2020–2026): Benoît Fidelin
- Area^{1}: 10.83 km^{2} (4.18 sq mi)
- Elevation: 86 m (282 ft)
- Highest elevation: 142 m (466 ft)
- Lowest elevation: 4 m (13 ft)
- Population (2023): 456
  - Density: 42.1/km^{2} (109/sq mi)
- Time zone: UTC+01:00 (CET)
  - Summer (DST): UTC+02:00 (CEST)
- INSEE/Postal code: 50238 /50340
- ^{1} French Land Register data, which excludes lakes, ponds, glaciers > 1 km^{2} (0.386 sq mi or 247 acres) and river estuaries.

Héauville (French pronunciation: [eovil]) is a commune in the Manche department in Normandy in north-western France.

== See also ==
- Communes of the Manche department
