= Anthony Herschel Hill =

English composer

- Born: Anthony Nelson Herschel Hill; 1939; Shrewsbury, England
- Died: 22 July 2016 (aged 76–77); City of London, London, England
- Education: Royal College of Music
- Occupations: Composer; pianist; organist; professor of music
- Spouse: Joan Havill (m. 1964; died 2016)

Anthony Nelson Herschel Hill (1939 – 22 July 2016) was an English musician, composer, and professor of music. During his lifetime, Herschel Hill composed some 24 symphonies and 14 concertos.

== Early life and education ==
Anthony Nelson Herschel Hill was born in 1939 in Shrewsbury, England, to the eminent psychiatrist Sir Denis Hill. He is a descendant of the astronomer and composer Sir William Herschel.

Herschel Hill studied at the Royal College of Music as a pianist, organist, and composer, for which he won several of the major prizes. While there, he studied with the musician composers Herbert Howells, Richard Latham, and Cyril Smith. After further study in Paris with French musician Nadia Boulanger and tutoring with Hungarian musician Louis Kentner, he began his career as a musician and teacher.

== Career ==
Herschel Hill has composed for piano, organ, and choir. He has played concertos with the London Philharmonic Orchestra and the Philharmonia. He has also performed a number of solo recitals across the United Kingdom, France, Singapore, and New Zealand. As a composer, several of his pieces have appeared on the Associated Board of the Royal Schools of Music (ABRSM) exam lists and on BBC Radio 3.

In 1982, Herschel Hill published two albums with the classical sheet music publisher Stainer & Bell: Four pieces for cello and piano and Two pieces for viola and piano. He wrote an additional album for them – O ye that love the Lord : trebles and organ – in 1986. That same year, he wrote two albums for the publisher Fraser-Enoch: Soliloquy for piano and Contrasts for piano.

He was a teacher of music at Bishop's Stortford College in Hertfordshire. By 1986, he was director of music at St Simon Zelotes Church in London, a position he held for more than a quarter of a century.

Herschel Hill has written a number of liturgical works. He wrote Ave Verum Corpus in 1990 for Prebendary John Pearce and the choir of St Simon Zelotes Church.

== Personal life ==
In 1964, Herschel Hill married Joan Havill, a New Zealand pianist, with whom he had studied at the Royal College of Music, in Kensington, London.

== Death ==
Herschel Hill died on 22 July 2016 in the City of London. His funeral was held on 10 August at St Marylebone Crematorium in East Finchley, London. Following his death, Radio Times wrote that his "true worth" was "yet to be fully appreciated."

== Discography ==
Year	Album	Publisher	Notes	Ref(s)
1980	Man shall be free	Banks Music		
1981	Toccata eroica	Robertson Publications		
1982	Four pieces for cello and piano	Stainer & Bell		
1982	Two pieces for viola and piano	Stainer & Bell		
1985	Toccata			
1986	O ye that love the Lord : trebles and organ	Stainer & Bell		
1986	Soliloquy for piano	Fraser-Enoch		
1986	Contrasts for piano	Fraser-Enoch		
1990	Ave Verum Corpus	Stainer & Bell		
1992	Litany			
2010	Piano: Beethoven, Schumann, A.Herschel Hill, P.Martin, Rachmaninoff	Caroline Clipsham		
2017	Piano Duo	Somm Recordings		
2023	Man Shall Be Free	G&L Musical	Posthumous	
