= Joan Havill =

New Zealand Pianist

Professor Joan Havill LRAM ARCM
- Born: Wellington, New Zealand
- Education: Royal College of Music
- Title: Senior Professor of Piano at the Guildhall School of Music and Drama
- Spouse: Anthony Herschel Hill (m. 1964; died 2016)
- Relatives: Philip Havill (cousin)

Joan Rosalie Havill is a concert pianist and piano tutor, currently serving as Senior Professor of Piano at the Guildhall School of Music and Drama in London. Having played with many leading orchestras and tutored dozens of award-winning students, Havill has gained worldwide recognition.

== Early life ==
Joan Havill was born in Wellington, New Zealand. She is a cousin of the New Zealand first-class cricketer Philip Havill. She began her musical studies giving concerts and broadcasts from early childhood. She moved to the United Kingdom to attend London's Royal College of Music, where she studied with the celebrated English pianist, Cyril Smith, and won several of the College's most prestigious prizes. During the 1960s, British Arts Council Scholarships sponsored studies firstly with Nadia Boulanger in Paris, and later in London with the Hungarian pianists Ilona Kabos and Louis Kentner. Havill made her Wigmore Hall debut in 1966, after which she began her concert career touring regularly throughout the United Kingdom, Ireland and Australasia.

== Career ==
Havill played concertos with many leading orchestras including the City of Birmingham Symphony Orchestra, BBC Symphony Orchestra and toured with the Ulster Orchestra and the New Zealand Symphony Orchestra offering a wide ranging concerto repertoire. She also gave many Wigmore Hall recitals, recorded for Vox and broadcast for BBC Radio 3, NZBC and BBC Television.

Since 1980, Havill has been a professor at the Guildhall School of Music & Drama in London, and in recent years has gained worldwide recognition as a teacher. Her students have featured amongst the major prize winners of many leading international piano competitions, including the Chopin Competition (Warsaw), Van Cliburn, Leeds, Scottish International, Royal Overseas League, Maria Canals, Montreal, Gina Bacchauer, Hamamatsu, Honens, Maria Callas, Marguerite Long, William Kapell and the Busoni. They include Paul Lewis, Sa Chen, Tom Poster, Lucy Parham, Gareth Owen, Mihai Ritivoiu, Misako Osada, Andrew Brownell, Cordelia Williams, James Sherlock and Serhiy Salov. In 1986 Joan Havill was made a Fellow of the Guildhall School of Music & Drama, and in 1996 she was given the title of Senior Professor of the Piano Department. She gives masterclasses regularly in England and abroad and is a well-known adjudicator.

== Personal life ==
In 1964, Havill married Anthony Herschel Hill, a distinguished composer, in Kensington, London.
