= Steven F. Havill =

American novelist (1945–2026)

- Born: Steven Frederick Havill; June 22, 1945; Penn Yan, New York, U.S.
- Died: August 27, 2026 (aged 81); Datil, New Mexico, U.S.
- Education: University of New Mexico (BA, MA)
- Occupation: Author
- Spouse: Kathleen
- Writing career
- Genres: Mystery fiction; western

Steven Frederick Havill (June 22, 1945 – August 27, 2026) was an American author of mysteries and westerns.

Havill lived in Datil, New Mexico, with his wife Kathleen, a writer and artist. A high school teacher of biology and English by day, Havill earned both his B.A. and M.A. from the University of New Mexico. He wrote two series of police procedurals set in the fictional Posadas County, New Mexico; along with other works.

Havill died on August 27, 2026, at the age of 81.

== Novels of the American West ==
- The Killer (1981)
- The Worst Enemy (1984)
- LeadFire (1985)
- TimberBlood (1989)

== The Bill Gastner mystery series ==
Set in the fictional Posadas County, New Mexico, this series features septuagenarian Bill Gastner as Undersheriff, then Sheriff, of Posadas County.

- Easy Errors (2017) Although this was written in 2017 it happens at the very beginning of the Bill Gastner series so it is the prequel to the prequel.
- One Perfect Shot (2012) Although this book was written in 2012, it is a prequel to the series. Bill Gastner is Undersheriff.
- Heartshot (1991)
- Bitter Recoil (1992)
- Twice Buried (1994)
- Before She Dies (1996)
- Privileged to Kill (1997)
- Prolonged Exposure (1998)
- Out of Season (1999)
- Dead Weight (2000)
- Bag Limit (2001)

== The Posadas County mystery series ==
This series focuses on Undersheriff Estella Reyes-Guzman, after Bill Gastner's retirement.

- Red, Green, or Murder (2009) Although this book was written in 2009, it happens before the first book in this series so it is the prequel to The Posadas County mystery series
- Scavengers (2002)
- A Discount for Death (2003)
- Convenient Disposal (2004)
- Statute of Limitations (2006)
- Final Payment (2007)
- The Fourth Time is Murder (2008)
- Double Prey (2011)
- Nightzone (2013)
- Blood Sweep (2015)
- Come Dark (2016)
- Lies Come Easy (2018)
- Less Than A Moment (2020)
- No Accident (March 2022)
- Perfect Opportunity (2024)
- If It Isn't One Thing (2025)
- Reverse (2026)

== Dr. Thomas Parks novels ==
- Race for the dying (2009)
- Comes a time for burning (2011)

== Anthology contributions ==
- "Red or Green?" in Deadly Morsels (2003)
