= Montigny =

Montigny is the name, or part of the name, of several places:

Belgium

- Montigny-le-Tilleul, a Walloon municipality located in the Belgian province of Hainaut

Several communes in northern France

- Montigny, Calvados, in the Calvados département
- Montigny, Cher, in the Cher département
- Montigny, Loiret, in the Loiret département
- Montigny, Manche, in the Manche département
- Montigny, Meurthe-et-Moselle, in the Meurthe-et-Moselle département
- Montigny, Sarthe, in the Sarthe département
- Montigny, Seine-Maritime, in the Seine-Maritime département
- Montigny-aux-Amognes, in the Nièvre département
- Montigny-devant-Sassey, in the Meuse département
- Montigny-en-Arrouaise, in the Aisne département
- Montigny-en-Cambrésis, in the Nord département
- Montigny-en-Gohelle, in the Pas-de-Calais département
- Montigny-en-Morvan, in the Nièvre département
- Montigny-en-Ostrevent, in the Nord département
- Montigny-l'Allier, in the Aisne département
- Montigny-la-Resle, in the Yonne département
- Montigny-le-Bretonneux, in the Yvelines département
- Montigny-le-Chartif, in the Eure-et-Loir département
- Montigny-le-Franc, in the Aisne département
- Montigny-le-Gannelon, in the Eure-et-Loir département
- Montigny-le-Guesdier, in the Seine-et-Marne département
- Montigny-Lencoup, in the Seine-et-Marne département
- Montigny-Lengrain, in the Aisne département
- Montigny-lès-Arsures, in the Jura département
- Montigny-lès-Cherlieu, in the Haute-Saône département
- Montigny-lès-Condé, in the Aisne département
- Montigny-lès-Cormeilles, in the Val-d'Oise département
- Montigny-les-Jongleurs, in the Somme département
- Montigny-lès-Metz, in the Moselle département
- Montigny-les-Monts, in the Aube département
- Montigny-lès-Vaucouleurs, in the Meuse département
- Montigny-lès-Vesoul, in the Haute-Saône département
- Montigny-Montfort, in the Côte-d'Or département
- Montigny-Mornay-Villeneuve-sur-Vingeanne, in the Côte-d'Or département
- Montigny-Saint-Barthélemy, in the Côte-d'Or département
- Montigny-sous-Marle, in the Aisne département
- Montigny-sur-Armançon, in the Côte-d'Or département
- Montigny-sur-Aube, in the Côte-d'Or département
- Montigny-sur-Avre, in the Eure-et-Loir département
- Montigny-sur-Canne, in the Nièvre département
- Montigny-sur-Chiers, in the Meurthe-et-Moselle département
- Montigny-sur-Crécy, in the Aisne département
- Montigny-sur-l'Ain, in the Jura département
- Montigny-sur-l'Hallue, in the Somme département
- Montigny-sur-Loing, in the Seine-et-Marne département
- Montigny-sur-Meuse, in the Ardennes département
- Montigny-sur-Vence, in the Ardennes département
- Montigny-sur-Vesle, in the Marne département
