= Gérard Toulouse =

French physicist (1939–2023)

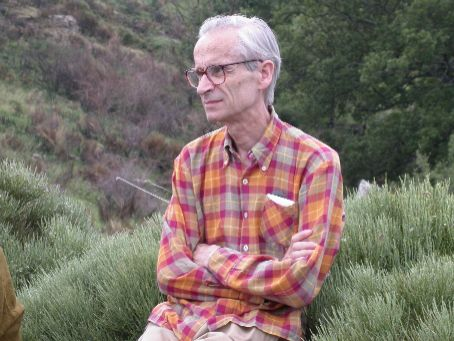
- Born: September 4, 1939; Vattetot-sur-Mer, France
- Died: August 7, 2023 (aged 83); Paris, France
- Awards: Prix Paul Langevin (1976); Holweck Prize (1983)
- Scientific career
- Fields: Physics
- Institutions: École Normale Supérieure

Gérard Marie Robert Toulouse (4 September 1939 – 7 August 2023) was a French theoretical physicist.

== Life and career ==
Gérard Marie Robert Toulouse was born in Vattetot-sur-Mer, Seine-Maritime on 4 September 1939.

Toulouse was co-founder and Secretary-General of the La Ferthé Foundation, hosted by the Fondation de France. The La Ferthé Foundation is a member of the French Centre for Foundations (since its creation in 2003), and is active in the cultural, scientific, economic and social fields by providing support to encourage study and creation. Among other actions, the foundation awards a prize 'Knowledge and Courage', the first winners of which were Florence Hartmann and Philippe Videlier (1998), and the most recent winners Sarah Oppenheim (2012), Nicole Otto (2013) and Lila Lamrani (2015).

Toulouse died on 7 August 2023, at the age of 83.

== Books for the general public ==
- Regards sur l'éthique des sciences, Hachette-Littératures, 1998.
- Les scientifiques et les droits de l'Homme, avec Lydie Koch-Miramond, Éditions de la Maison des sciences de l'homme, 2003.
- Quelle éthique pour les sciences ?, avec Guillemette de Véricourt, Collection 'Les Essentiels Milan', Éditions Milan, 2005.
- Sciences et Éthique. Chroniques (2003-2011), éditions Rue d'Ulm, 2016 [recueil de chroniques du journal La Croix]
