= Brisby =

Brisby is a surname. Notable people with the surname include:

- Liliana Brisby (1923–1998), Bulgarian-born British broadcaster, writer, editor, and concert pianist
- Vincent Brisby (born 1971), American football player
- Emanual Brisby (born 1988), Mailman

== Fictional characters ==
- Mrs. Brisby (originally Mrs. Frisby in Robert C. O'Brien's 1971 children's novel Mrs. Frisby and the Rats of NIMH), the main protagonist in 1982 animated film adaptation The Secret of NIMH

== See also ==
- Risby (disambiguation)
