= Marcilly =

Marcilly may refer to:

== Places in France ==
- Marcilly, Manche, in the Manche département
- Marcilly, Seine-et-Marne, in the Seine-et-Marne département
- Marcilly-d'Azergues, in the Rhône département
- Marcilly-en-Bassigny, in the Haute-Marne département
- Marcilly-en-Beauce, in the Loir-et-Cher département
- Marcilly-en-Gault, in the Loir-et-Cher département
- Marcilly-en-Villette, in the Loiret département
- Marcilly-et-Dracy, in the Côte-d'Or département
- Marcilly-la-Campagne, in the Eure département
- Marcilly-la-Gueurce, in the Saône-et-Loire département
- Marcilly-le-Châtel, in the Loire département
- Marcilly-le-Hayer, in the Aube département
- Marcilly-lès-Buxy, in the Saône-et-Loire département
- Marcilly-Ogny, in the Côte-d'Or département
- Marcilly-sur-Eure, in the Eure département
- Marcilly-sur-Maulne, in the Indre-et-Loire département
- Marcilly-sur-Seine, in the Marne département
- Marcilly-sur-Tille, in the Côte-d'Or département
- Marcilly-sur-Vienne, in the Indre-et-Loire département
