= Amfreville =

Amfreville may refer to the following places in Normandy, France:

- Amfreville, Calvados, in the Calvados département
- Amfreville, Manche, in the Manche département
- Amfreville-la-Campagne, in the Eure département
- Amfreville-la-Mi-Voie, in the Seine-Maritime département
- Amfreville-les-Champs, Eure, in the Eure département
- Amfreville-les-Champs, Seine-Maritime, in the Seine-Maritime département
- Amfreville-sous-les-Monts, in the Eure département
- Amfreville-sur-Iton, in the Eure département
