= Touffreville =

Touffreville may refer to the following communes in France, in the region Normandy:

- Touffreville, Eure, in the Eure département
- Touffreville-la-Cable, in the Seine-Maritime département
- Touffreville-la-Corbeline, in the Seine-Maritime département
- Touffreville-sur-Eu, in the Seine-Maritime département

== See also ==
- Touffréville, in the Calvados département
