= Amfreville-les-Champs =

Amfreville-les-Champs is the name of two communes in Normandy, France:

- Amfreville-les-Champs, Eure, in the Eure département
- Amfreville-les-Champs, Seine-Maritime, in the Seine-Maritime département
