= Sotteville =

Sotteville may refer to one of several municipalities in the Normandy region of France:

- Sotteville, Manche
- Sotteville-lès-Rouen
- Sotteville-sous-le-Val
- Sotteville-sur-Mer
