= Canapville =

Canapville is the name of several communes in Normandy, France:

- Canapville, Calvados
- Canapville, Orne
