= Fresville =

- Commune
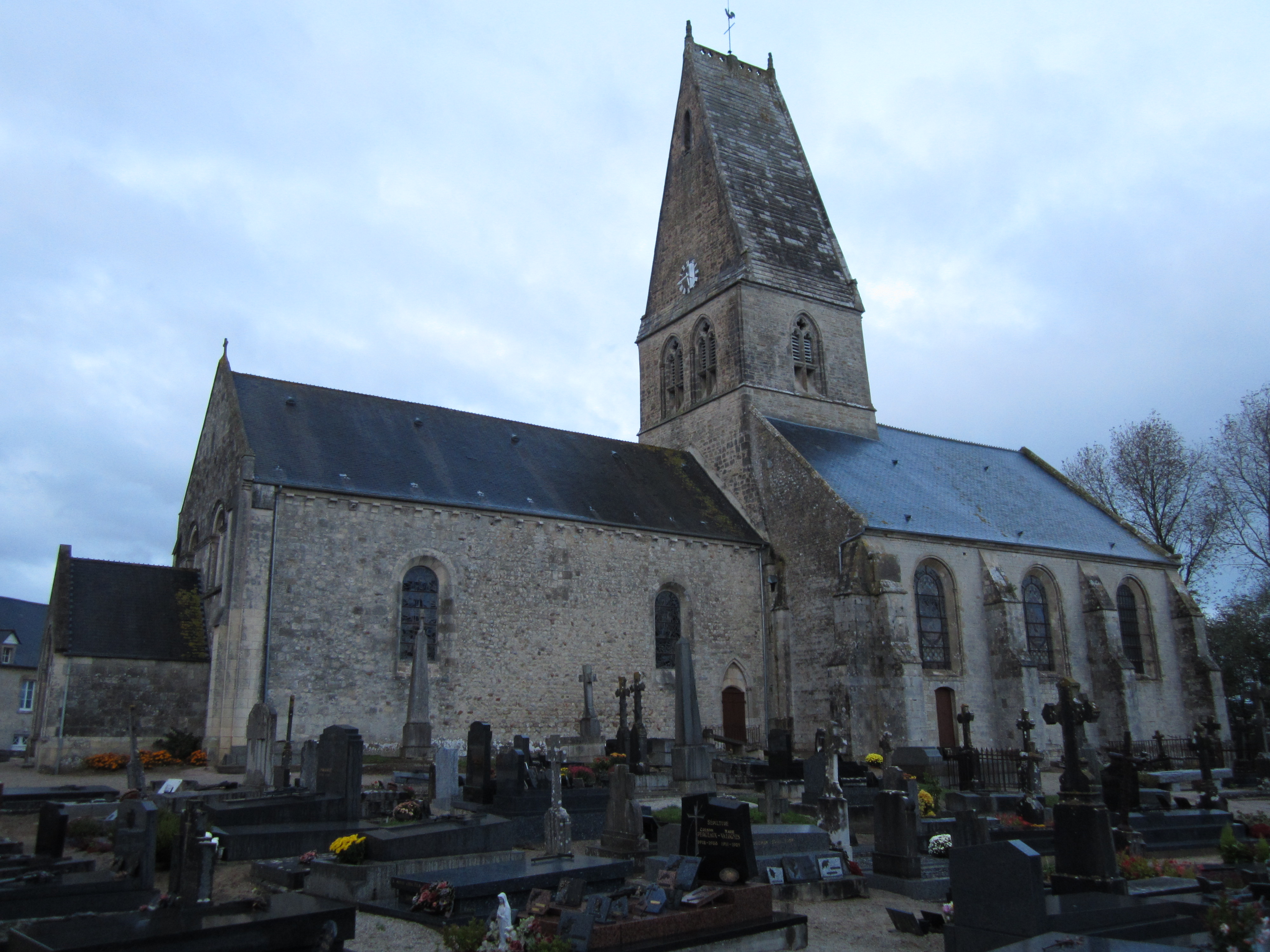
- The church of Saint-Martin
- Location of Fresville
- Location within France Location within Normandy
- Coordinates: 49°26′25″N 1°21′17″W
- Country: France
- Region: Normandy
- Department: Manche
- Arrondissement: Cherbourg
- Canton: Valognes
- Intercommunality: CA Cotentin

Government
  - Mayor (2020–2026): Jocelyne Levavasseur
- Area^{1}: 13.94 km^{2} (5.38 sq mi)
- Elevation: 23 m (75 ft)
- Highest elevation: 36 m (118 ft)
- Lowest elevation: 1 m (3.3 ft)
- Population (2023): 373
  - Density: 26.8/km^{2} (69.3/sq mi)
- Time zone: UTC+01:00 (CET)
  - Summer (DST): UTC+02:00 (CEST)
- INSEE/Postal code: 50194 /50310
- ^{1} French Land Register data, which excludes lakes, ponds, glaciers > 1 km^{2} (0.386 sq mi or 247 acres) and river estuaries.

Fresville (French pronunciation: [fʁɛvil]) is a commune in the Manche department in north-western France.

== See also ==
- Communes of the Manche department
