= Crasville =

Crasville may refer to the four communes in the region of Normandy in France:

- Crasville, Eure
- Crasville, Manche
- Crasville-la-Mallet, in the Seine-Maritime département
- Crasville-la-Rocquefort, in the Seine-Maritime département
