= Gonneville-la-Mallet =

- Commune
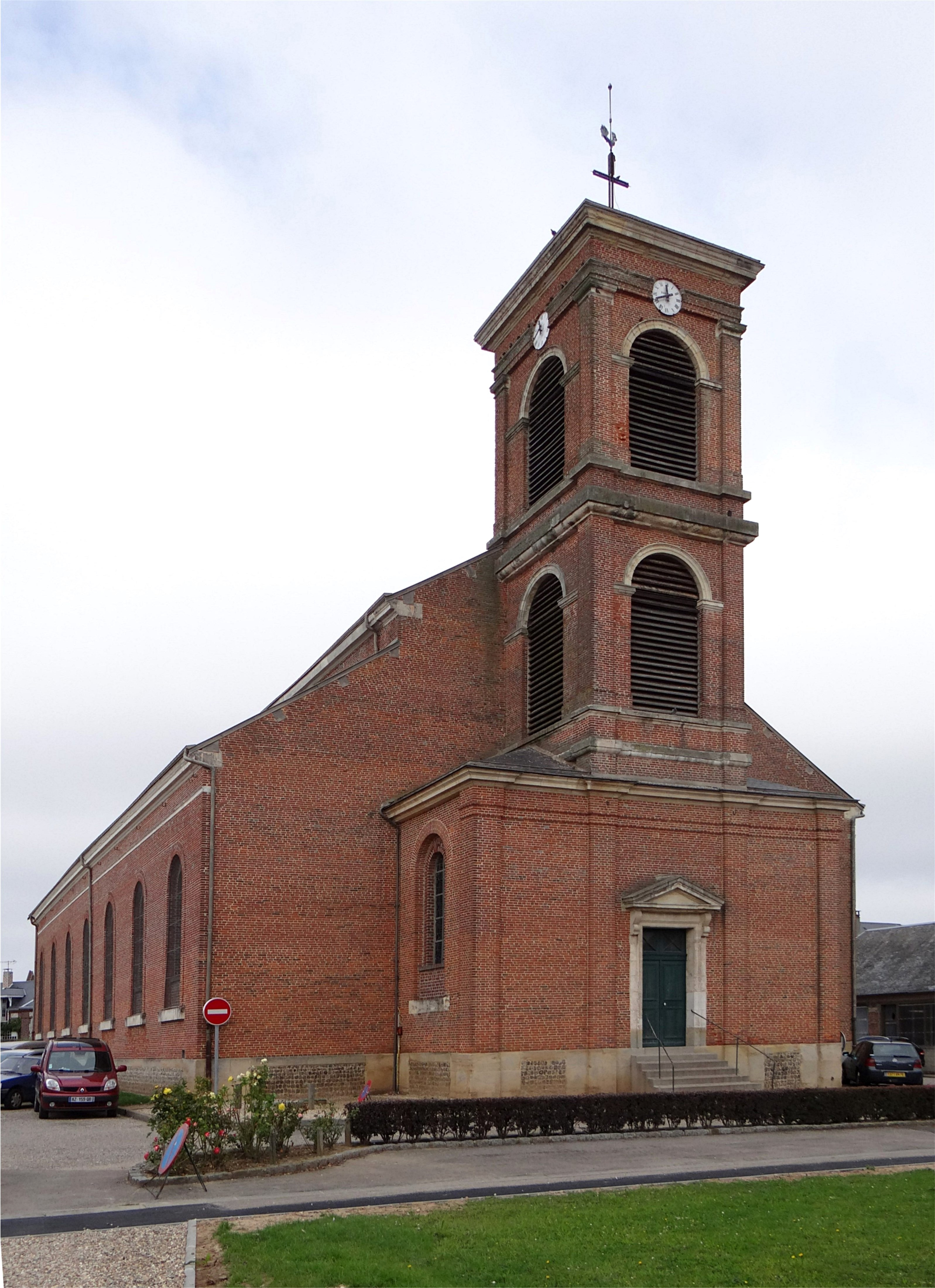
- The church in Gonneville-la-Mallet

- Coat of arms
- Location of Gonneville-la-Mallet
- Location within France Location within Normandy
- Coordinates: 49°38′25″N 0°13′23″E
- Country: France
- Region: Normandy
- Department: Seine-Maritime
- Arrondissement: Le Havre
- Canton: Octeville-sur-Mer
- Intercommunality: Le Havre Seine Métropole

Government
  - Mayor (2026–32): Hervé Lepileur
- Area^{1}: 7.32 km^{2} (2.83 sq mi)
- Elevation: 126 m (413 ft)
- Highest elevation: 137 m (449 ft)
- Lowest elevation: 65 m (213 ft)
- Population (2023): 1,338
  - Density: 183/km^{2} (473/sq mi)
- Time zone: UTC+01:00 (CET)
  - Summer (DST): UTC+02:00 (CEST)
- INSEE/Postal code: 76307 /76280
- ^{1} French Land Register data, which excludes lakes, ponds, glaciers > 1 km^{2} (0.386 sq mi or 247 acres) and river estuaries.

Gonneville-la-Mallet (French pronunciation: [ɡɔnvil la malɛ]) is a commune in the Seine-Maritime department in the Normandy region in northern France.

== Geography ==
A farming village situated in the Pays de Caux, some 11 miles (18 km) north of Le Havre, at the junction of the D129 and D32 roads.

== Population ==
Historical population
Year	Pop.	±% p.a.
1968	809	—
1975	868	+1.01%
1982	1,037	+2.57%
1990	1,166	+1.48%
1999	1,139	−0.26%
2007	1,246	+1.13%
2012	1,330	+1.31%
2017	1,334	+0.06%
2023	1,338	+0.05%
Source: INSEE

== Places of interest ==
- The church of St. Pierre, dating from the nineteenth century.

== See also ==
- Communes of the Seine-Maritime department
