= Trouville =

Trouville is the name or part of the name of several communes of Normandy, France:

- Trouville-sur-Mer, in the Calvados department, arguably the most famous of these communes, and commonly referred to as Trouville
- Trouville-Alliquerville, in the Seine-Maritime department
- Trouville-la-Haule, in the Eure department

== Other uses ==
- Plaza Trouville, a town square in the Pocitos neighbourhood of Montevideo, Uruguay
- Club Trouville, a sports club based in Montevideo
