= Montigny-sur-Armançon =

- Commune
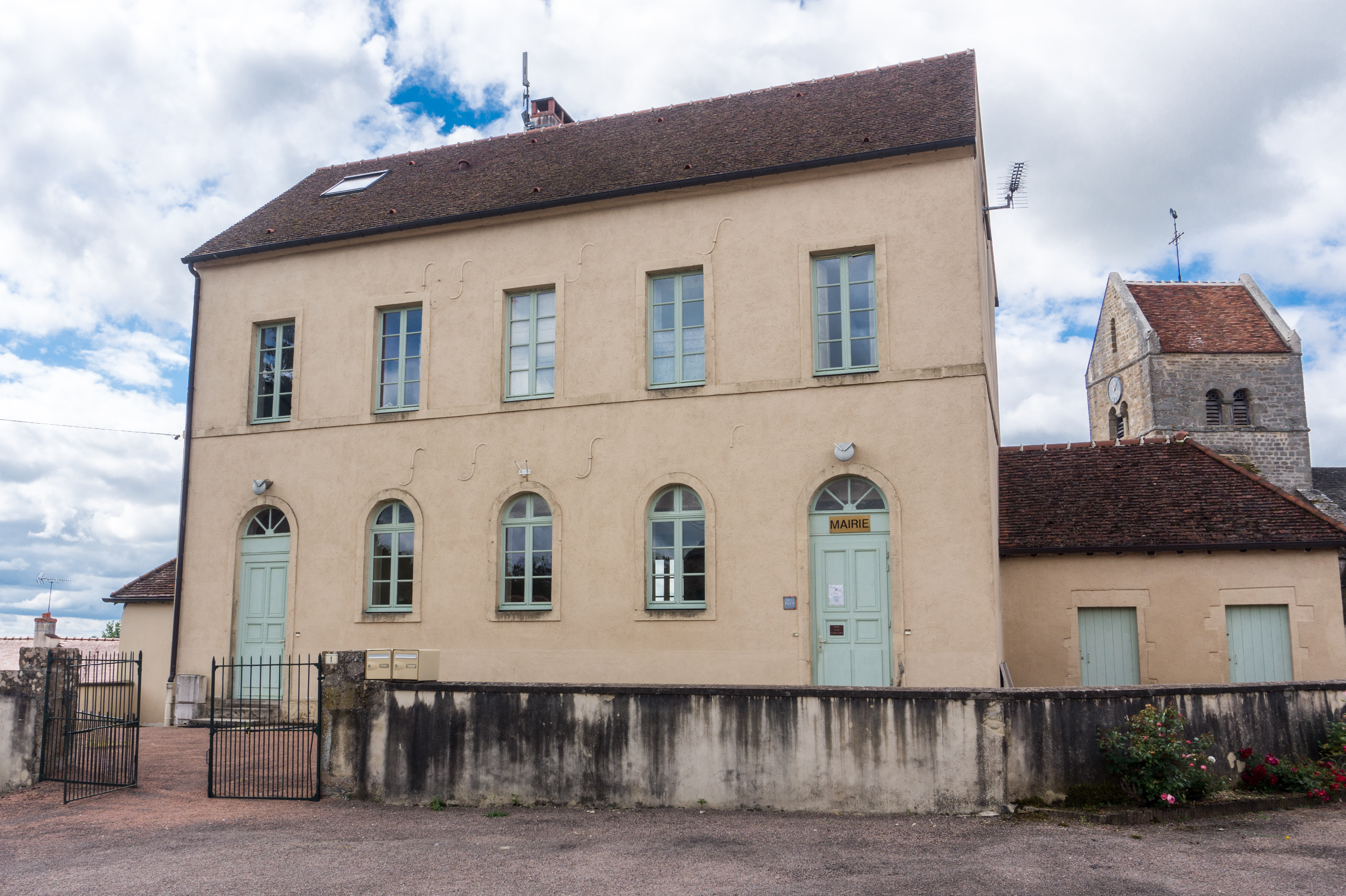
- Montigny-sur-Armançon Town hall
- Location of Montigny-sur-Armançon
- Location within France Location within Bourgogne-Franche-Comté
- Coordinates: 47°26′03″N 4°22′30″E
- Country: France
- Region: Bourgogne-Franche-Comté
- Department: Côte-d'Or
- Arrondissement: Montbard
- Canton: Semur-en-Auxois

Government
  - Mayor (2020–2026): Christian Carayon
- Area^{1}: 8.12 km^{2} (3.14 sq mi)
- Highest elevation: 356 m (1,168 ft)
- Lowest elevation: 290 m (950 ft)
- Population (2023): 158
  - Density: 19.5/km^{2} (50.4/sq mi)
- Demonym: Montignarmançonnais
- Time zone: UTC+01:00 (CET)
  - Summer (DST): UTC+02:00 (CEST)
- INSEE/Postal code: 21431 /21140
- ^{1} French Land Register data, which excludes lakes, ponds, glaciers > 1 km^{2} (0.386 sq mi or 247 acres) and river estuaries.

Montigny-sur-Armançon (French pronunciation: [mɔ̃tiɲi syʁ aʁmɑ̃sɔ̃], literally Montigny on Armançon) is a commune in the Côte-d'Or department in eastern France.

== Population ==
Historical population
Year	Pop.	±% p.a.
1968	109	—
1975	79	−4.49%
1982	84	+0.88%
1990	101	+2.33%
1999	100	−0.11%
2007	133	+3.63%
2012	146	+1.88%
2017	152	+0.81%
2023	158	+0.65%
Source: INSEE

== See also ==
- Communes of the Côte-d'Or department
