= Le Ham =

Le Ham may refer to the following places in France:

- Le Ham, Manche, a commune in the Manche department
- Le Ham, Mayenne, a commune in the Mayenne department
