= Brainville =

Brainville may refer to:

- a song by The Flaming Lips from the 1995 album Clouds Taste Metallic
- Brainville (band), an English avant-garde supergroup

== Communes in France ==
- Brainville, Manche
- Brainville, Meurthe-et-Moselle
- Brainville-sur-Meuse, in the Haute-Marne département

== See also ==
- Branville, Calvados, Normandy, France
