= Tourville =

Tourville is a placename and derived surname of French origin which may refer to:

== People ==
- Anne Hilarion de Tourville (1642–1701), French naval commander
- Camille Tourville (1927–1985), Canadian professional wrestler
- Charles Bertin Gaston Chapuis de Tourville (1740–1809), French general
- Glen Tourville, American soccer player and coach
- Henri de Tourville (1842–1905), French priest and sociologist
- Rodolphe Tourville (1867–1927), Canadian politician

== Places ==
=== Australia ===
- Cape Tourville, Tasmania
  - Cape Tourville Lighthouse
- Tourville and Murat Bays Important Bird Area, South Australia

=== Canada ===
- Tourville, Quebec

=== France ===
- Tourville-sur-Arques
- Tourville-en-Auge
- Tourville-la-Campagne
- Tourville-la-Chapelle
- Tourville-les-Ifs
- Tourville-sur-Odon
- Tourville-sur-Pont-Audemer
- Tourville-la-Rivière
- Tourville-sur-Sienne

== Ships ==
- French ship Tourville, several ships, including
  - French cruiser Tourville (1926)
  - French frigate Tourville (D 610)
  - French ship Tourville (1788)
- Tourville-class frigate
- French submarine Tourville
