= Marcilly-sur-Tille =

- Commune
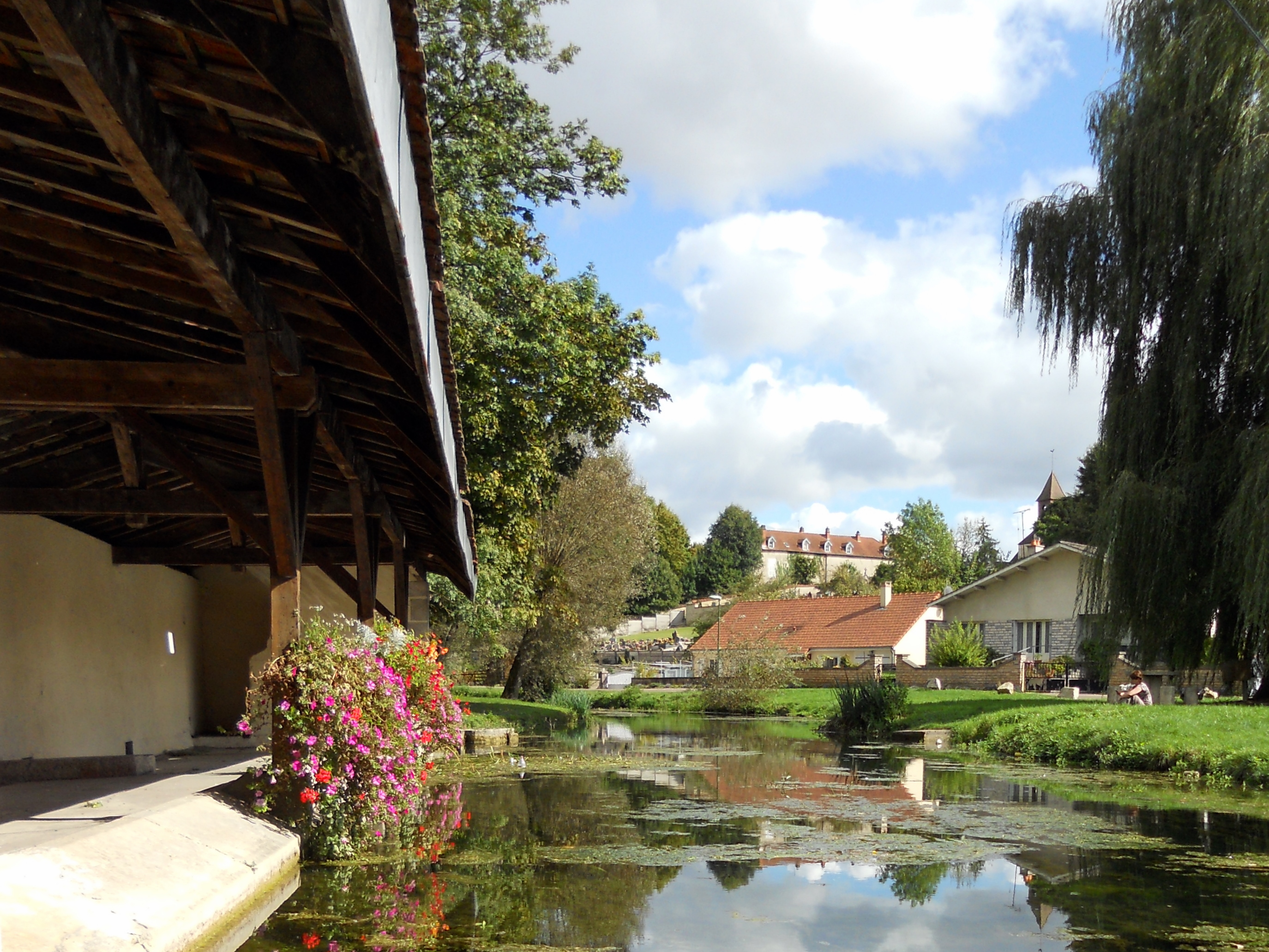
- The washhouse and surroundings in Marcilly-sur-Tille
- Location of Marcilly-sur-Tille
- Location within France Location within Bourgogne-Franche-Comté
- Coordinates: 47°31′12″N 5°07′57″E
- Country: France
- Region: Bourgogne-Franche-Comté
- Department: Côte-d'Or
- Arrondissement: Dijon
- Canton: Is-sur-Tille

Government
  - Mayor (2020–2026): Daniel Lavèvre
- Area^{1}: 7.27 km^{2} (2.81 sq mi)
- Elevation: 213 m (699 ft)
- Highest elevation: 333 m (1,093 ft)
- Lowest elevation: 267 m (876 ft)
- Population (2023): 1,744
  - Density: 240/km^{2} (621/sq mi)
- Time zone: UTC+01:00 (CET)
  - Summer (DST): UTC+02:00 (CEST)
- INSEE/Postal code: 21383 /21120
- Website: https://www.marcillysurtille.fr/
- ^{1} French Land Register data, which excludes lakes, ponds, glaciers > 1 km^{2} (0.386 sq mi or 247 acres) and river estuaries.

Marcilly-sur-Tille (French pronunciation: [maʁsiji syʁ tij], literally Marcilly on Tille) is a commune in the Côte-d'Or department in eastern France.

== Etymology ==
According to Auguste Mochot, publishing a book on Marcilly-sur-Tille in 1882, the origin of the name would come from "Mar" = isolated mountain and "arci" = entrenched place, which makes "Marci" = entrenched place near of an isolated mountain. The final "illy" to be regarded as a detail of locution specific to the idiom of the region.

== Town planning ==
=== Typology ===
Marcilly-sur-Tille is an urban municipality, because it is a part of dense municipalities or intermediate density, within the meaning of the municipal density grid of INSEE. It belongs to the urban unit of Is-sur-Tille, an intra-departmental agglomeration regrouping 2 communes and 6,068 inhabitants in 2017, of which it is a commune of the suburbs.

In addition, the municipality is part of the attraction area of Dijon, of which it is a municipality in the crown. This area, which includes 333 municipalities, is categorized in areas of 200,000 to less than 700,000 inhabitants.

=== Land use ===
The zoning of the municipality, as reflected in the database European occupation biophysical soil Corine Land Cover (CLC), is marked by the importance of the agricultural land (76.7% in 2018), a proportion roughly equivalent to that of 1990 (75.5%). The detailed breakdown in 2018 is as follows:

- arable land (65.9%)
- heterogeneous agricultural areas (10.8%)
- urbanized areas (10.6%)
- industrial or commercial areas and communication networks (6%)
- forests (3.4%)
- inland waters (3.2%)

The IGN also provides an online tool to compare the evolution over time of land use in the municipality (or in territories at different scales). Several eras are accessible as aerial maps or photos: the Cassini map (18th century), the map of Staff (1820-1866) and the current period (1950 to present).

== History ==
By its isolated position, the location of Mont de Marcilly naturally attracted prehistoric men. Indeed, it allowed the control of the valley of the Tille. This observation post also served as a refuge in case of danger. Weapons (blades of sickles and knives), clearly specialized tools (like saw) were found there and are exhibited at the Archaeological Museum of Dijon.

In the 16th century, the town was called Marcilly and, in Patois, Marcillei. Its inhabitants are the Marcillians. It depended on the diocese of Langres and was part of Champagne at that time. It was not until 1790 that it was attached to the Côte d'Or. Apart from a lawsuit for grazing in 1566, the Marcillians generally have good relations with the Issois (residents of Is-sur-Tille). They would even have united, as Huguenots (or Reformed) to burn the hunt which contained the relics of Saint-Florent in Til-Châtel. But with the revocation of the Edict of Nantes, 78 inhabitants, or 3/4 of the population abjured and returned to the bosom of the Catholic Church.

There have been many lords in Marcilly since around 1,250: Lords of Til-Châtel, of Gemini, then of Is in part, according to the different marriages, partitions, inheritances of the time. Around 1876, there were mostly wine growers and cultivators. The village consisted of only two streets that met at an acute angle in front of the church: rue de la Route (now called Grande Rue) and rue du Potet.

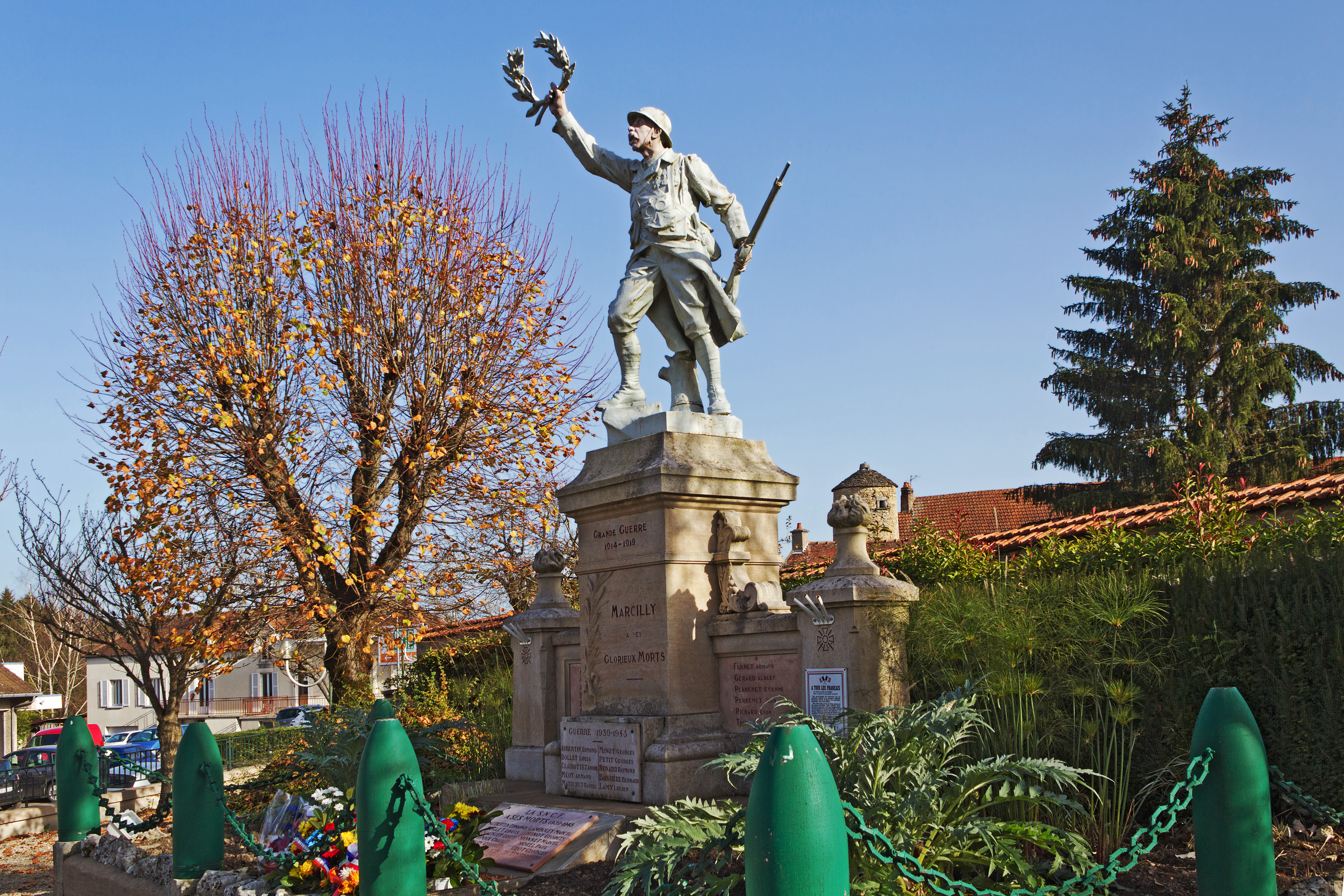
A World War I memorial in Marcilly-sur-Tille

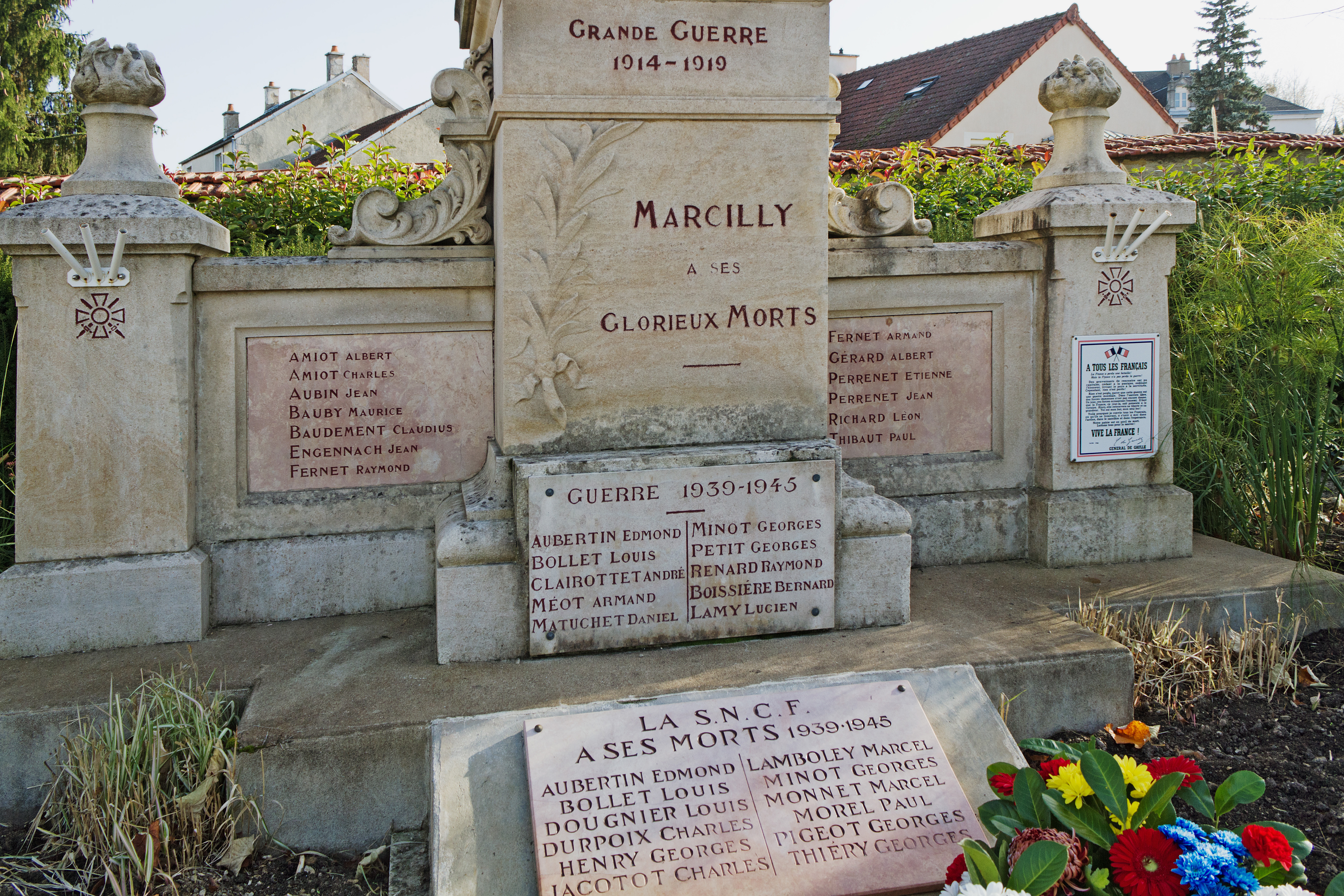
Detail of the plaques below the statue

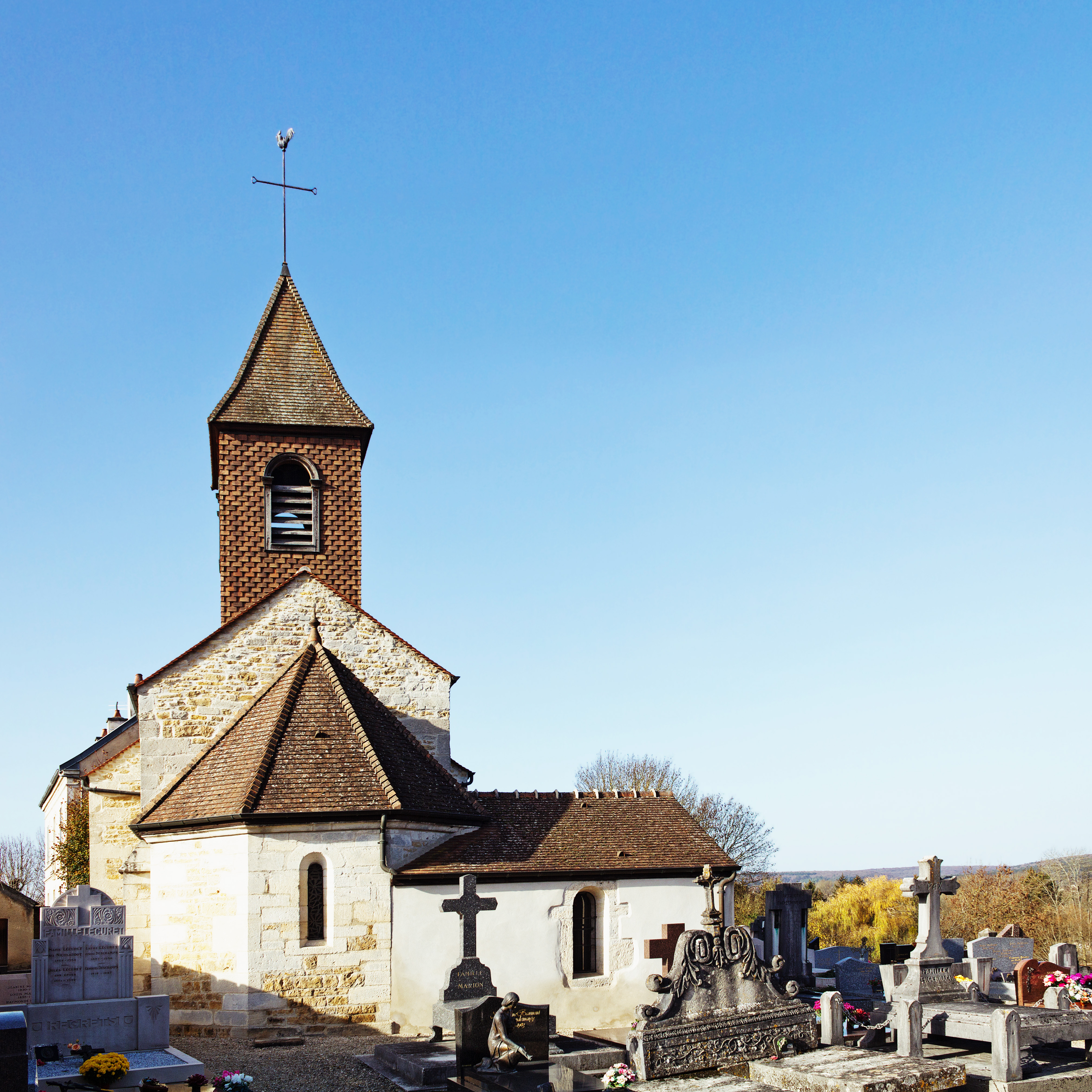
Saint-Maurice Church

== Population ==
Historical population
Year	Pop.	±% p.a.
1968	733	—
1975	1,209	+7.41%
1982	1,350	+1.59%
1990	1,403	+0.48%
1999	1,432	+0.23%
2007	1,493	+0.52%
2012	1,663	+2.18%
2017	1,666	+0.04%
2023	1,744	+0.77%
Source: INSEE

== See also ==
- Communes of the Côte-d'Or department
