= Oudalle =

- Commune
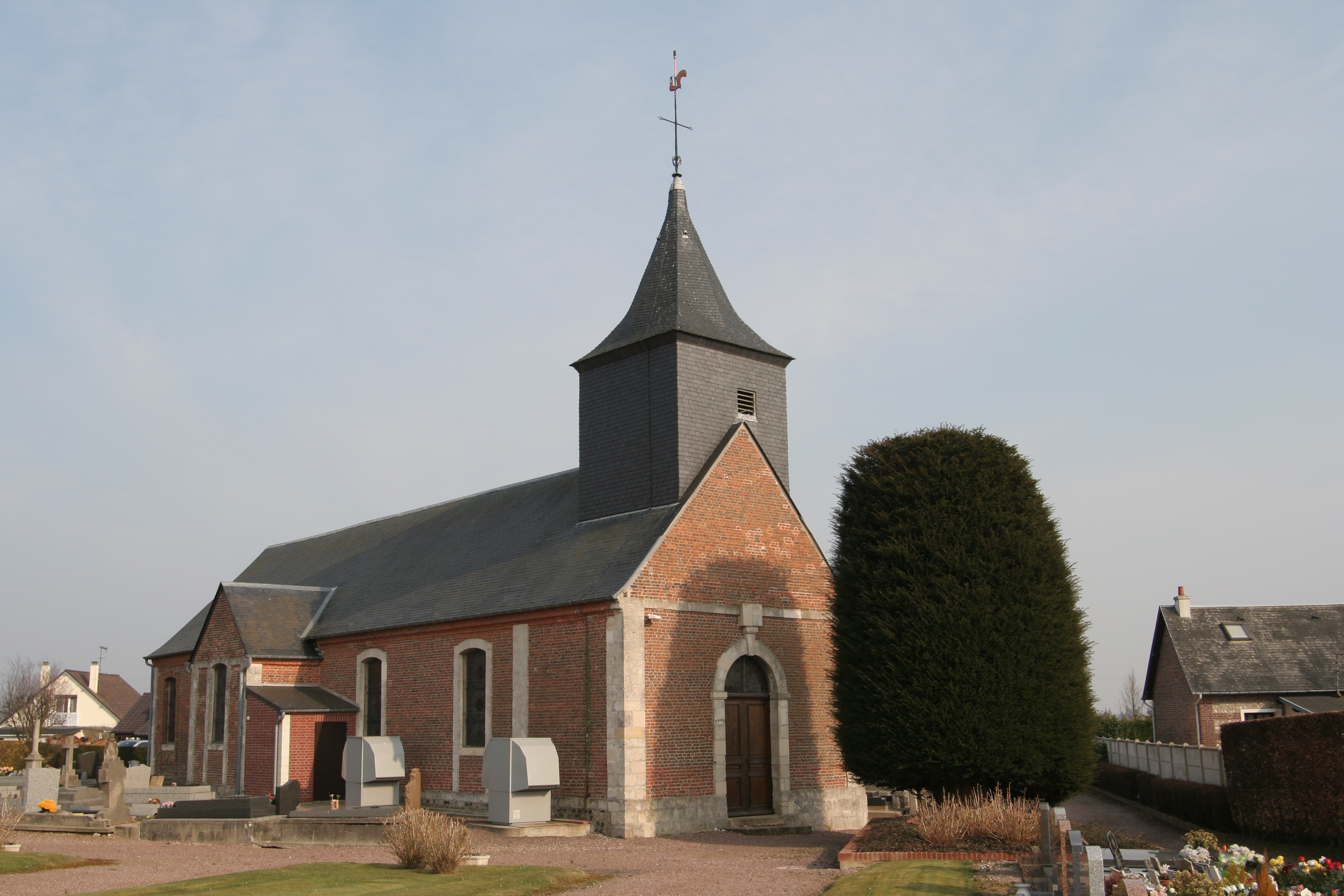
- The church in Oudalle

- Coat of arms
- Location of Oudalle
- Location within France Location within Normandy
- Coordinates: 49°30′23″N 0°17′57″E
- Country: France
- Region: Normandy
- Department: Seine-Maritime
- Arrondissement: Le Havre
- Canton: Saint-Romain-de-Colbosc
- Intercommunality: Le Havre Seine Métropole

Government
  - Mayor (2020–2026): Jean-Michel Argentin
- Area^{1}: 9.65 km^{2} (3.73 sq mi)
- Elevation: 90 m (300 ft)
- Highest elevation: 109 m (358 ft)
- Lowest elevation: 0 m (0 ft)
- Population (2023): 520
  - Density: 54/km^{2} (140/sq mi)
- Time zone: UTC+01:00 (CET)
  - Summer (DST): UTC+02:00 (CEST)
- INSEE/Postal code: 76489 /76430
- ^{1} French Land Register data, which excludes lakes, ponds, glaciers > 1 km^{2} (0.386 sq mi or 247 acres) and river estuaries.

Oudalle (French pronunciation: [udal]) is a commune in the Seine-Maritime department in the Normandy region in northern France.

== Geography ==
A village with light industry in its southern sector and farming in the northern part, in the Pays de Caux, situated some 8 miles (13 km) east of Le Havre, at the junction of the A131 autoroute with junction 5 of the A29 autoroute as it crosses the canal de Tancarville, the canal du Havre and the river Seine.

== Heraldry ==
| Arms of Oudalle | The arms of Oudalle are blazoned : Argent, a chevron inverted vert in chief a wolf head erased sable, and on a chief azure, a drakkar Or. |

== Population ==
Historical population
| Year | Pop. | ±% p.a. |
|---|---|---|
| 1968 | 151 | — |
| 1975 | 183 | +2.78% |
| 1982 | 252 | +4.68% |
| 1990 | 330 | +3.43% |
| 1999 | 368 | +1.22% |
| 2007 | 357 | −0.38% |
| 2012 | 404 | +2.50% |
| 2017 | 440 | +1.72% |
| 2023 | 520 | +2.82% |
Source: INSEE

== Places of interest ==
- The church of St.Pierre, dating from the eighteenth century.

== See also ==
- Communes of the Seine-Maritime department
