= Heuqueville =

Heuqueville may refer to the following places in France:

- Heuqueville, Eure, a commune in the Eure department
- Heuqueville, Seine-Maritime, a commune in the Seine-Maritime department
