= Cuverville =

Cuverville is the name or part of the name of several communes in Normandy, France:

- Cuverville, Calvados, in the Calvados département
- Cuverville, Eure, in the Eure département
- Cuverville, Seine-Maritime, in the Seine-Maritime département, associated with André Gide
- Cuverville-sur-Yères, in the Seine-Maritime département

== See also ==
- Louis-Hyacinte de Cavelier de Cuverville, French Navy officer
- Jules de Cuverville, French Navy officer
- Cuverville Island, Antarctic island named in honour of Jules de Cuverville
