= Cléville =

Cléville is the name of several communes in France:

- Cléville, Calvados, in the Calvados département
- Cléville, Seine-Maritime, in the Seine-Maritime département
