= Salhus =

Salhus may refer to:

== Places ==
- Salhus, Vestland, a village in Bergen municipality, Vestland county, Norway
- Salhus Church, a church in Bergen municipality, Vestland county, Norway
- Salhus, Nordland, a village in Brønnøy municipality, Nordland county, Norway
- Salhus, Rogaland, a village in Karmøy municipality, Rogaland county, Norway

== Other ==
- IL Norna-Salhus, a sports club based in Bergen municipality, Vestland county, Norway
