= Bolleville =

Bolleville is the name of two communes in Normandy, France:

- Bolleville, Manche, in the Manche département
- Bolleville, Seine-Maritime, in the Seine-Maritime département
