= Yébleron =

- Commune
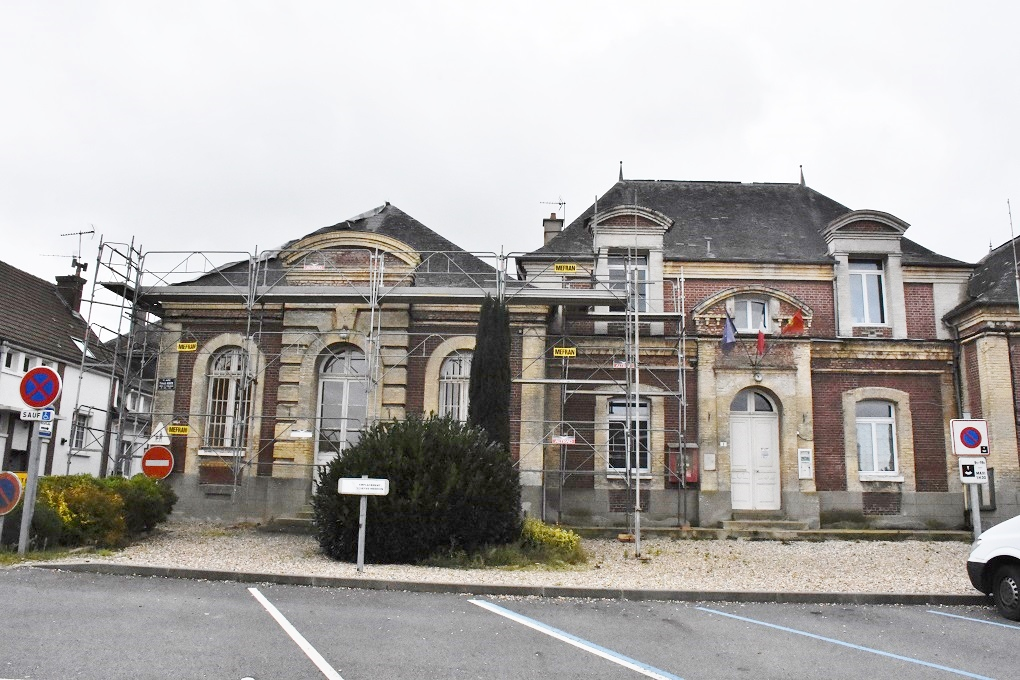
- The town hall in Yébleron
- Location of Yébleron
- Location within France Location within Normandy
- Coordinates: 49°38′01″N 0°32′16″E
- Country: France
- Region: Normandy
- Department: Seine-Maritime
- Arrondissement: Le Havre
- Canton: Saint-Valery-en-Caux
- Intercommunality: Caux Seine Agglo

Government
  - Mayor (2026–32): Nathalie Lemesle
- Area^{1}: 10.39 km^{2} (4.01 sq mi)
- Elevation: 140 m (460 ft)
- Highest elevation: 150 m (490 ft)
- Lowest elevation: 122 m (400 ft)
- Population (2023): 1,278
  - Density: 123.0/km^{2} (318.6/sq mi)
- Time zone: UTC+01:00 (CET)
  - Summer (DST): UTC+02:00 (CEST)
- INSEE/Postal code: 76751 /76640
- ^{1} French Land Register data, which excludes lakes, ponds, glaciers > 1 km^{2} (0.386 sq mi or 247 acres) and river estuaries.

Yébleron (French pronunciation: [jɛbləʁɔ̃]) is a commune in the Seine-Maritime department in the Normandy region in northern France.

== Geography ==
A farming village in the Pays de Caux, situated some 18 miles (29 km) northeast of Le Havre, at the junction of the D18, D104 and D149 roads. The A29 autoroute forms part of the commune's southern border.

== Population ==
Historical population
Year	Pop.	±% p.a.
1968	1,002	—
1975	980	−0.32%
1982	1,148	+2.29%
1990	1,268	+1.25%
1999	1,343	+0.64%
2007	1,370	+0.25%
2012	1,375	+0.07%
2017	1,284	−1.36%
2023	1,278	−0.08%
Source: INSEE

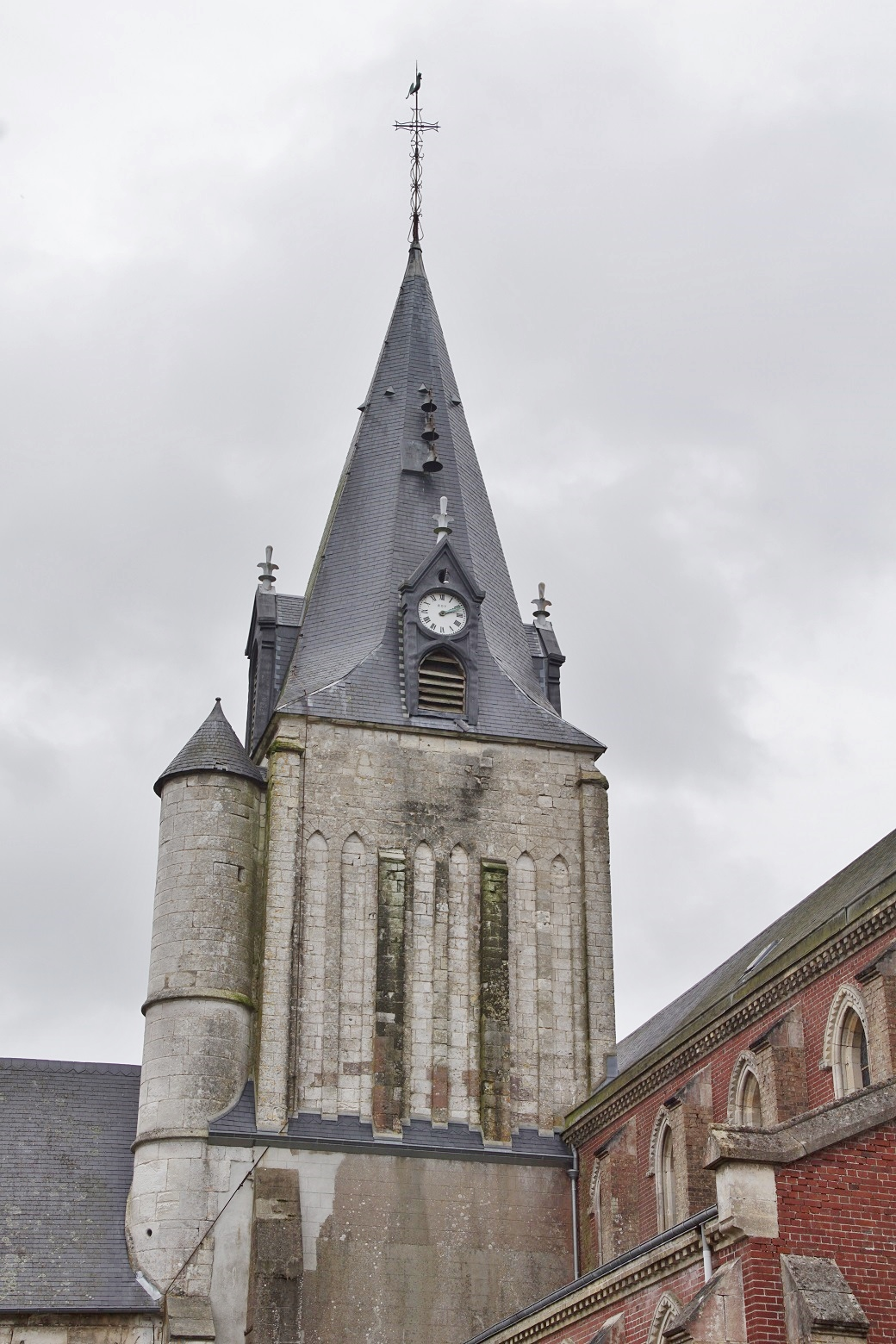
Church of St. Leger

== Places of interest ==
- The church of St. Leger, dating from the thirteenth century.
- A seventeenth-century stone cross.
- A medieval enclosure.

== See also ==
- Communes of the Seine-Maritime department
