= Vattetot-sous-Beaumont =

- Commune
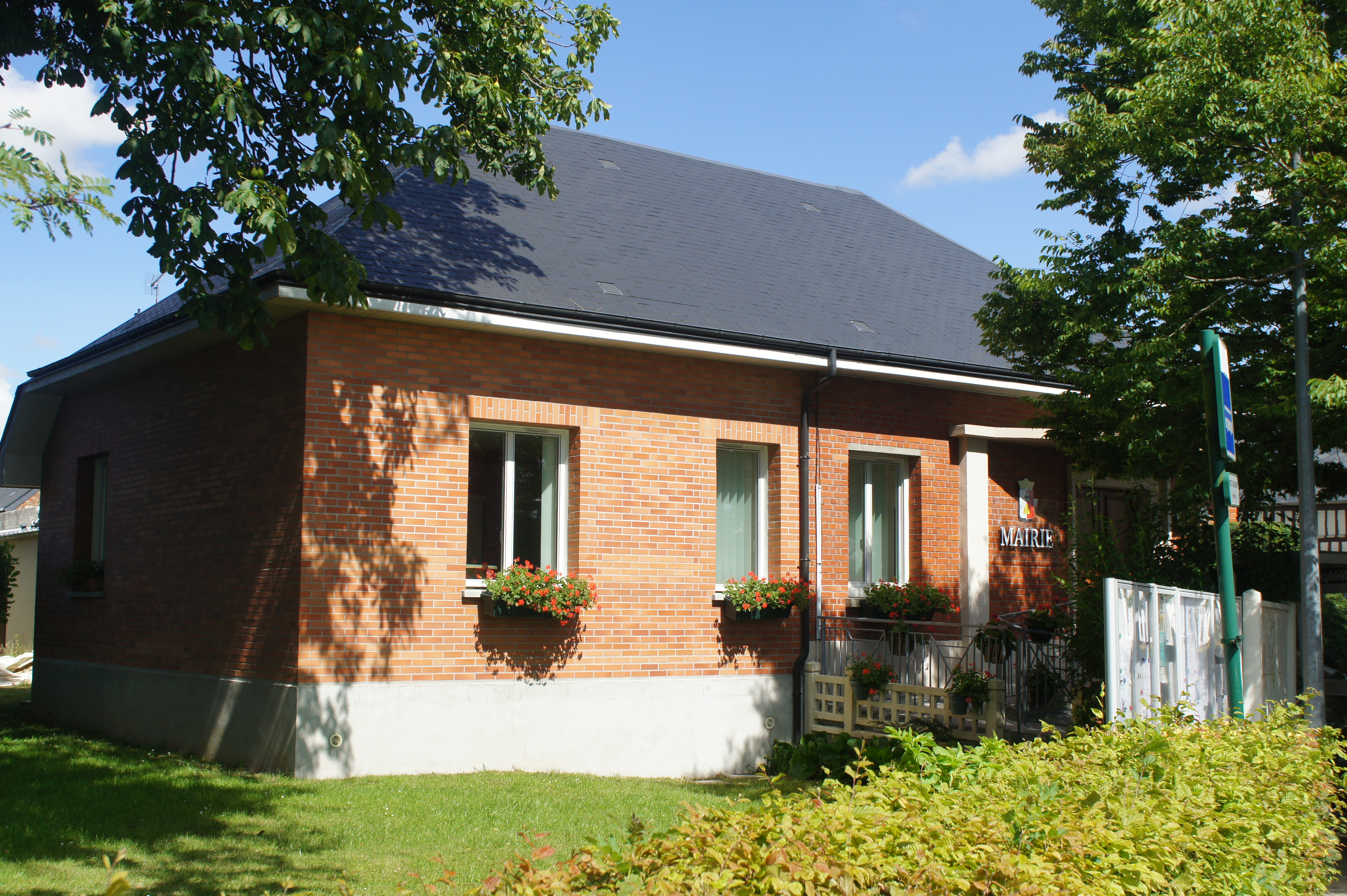
- The town hall in Vattetot-sous-Beaumont

- Coat of arms
- Location of Vattetot-sous-Beaumont
- Location within France Location within Normandy
- Coordinates: 49°37′34″N 0°26′50″E
- Country: France
- Region: Normandy
- Department: Seine-Maritime
- Arrondissement: Le Havre
- Canton: Saint-Romain-de-Colbosc
- Intercommunality: CC Campagne de Caux

Government
  - Mayor (2026–32): Hervé Niepceron
- Area^{1}: 6.94 km^{2} (2.68 sq mi)
- Elevation: 140 m (460 ft)
- Highest elevation: 147 m (482 ft)
- Lowest elevation: 93 m (305 ft)
- Population (2023): 586
  - Density: 84.4/km^{2} (219/sq mi)
- Time zone: UTC+01:00 (CET)
  - Summer (DST): UTC+02:00 (CEST)
- INSEE/Postal code: 76725 /76110
- ^{1} French Land Register data, which excludes lakes, ponds, glaciers > 1 km^{2} (0.386 sq mi or 247 acres) and river estuaries.

Vattetot-sous-Beaumont is a commune in the Seine-Maritime department in the Normandy region in northern France.

== Geography ==
A farming village in the Pays de Caux, situated some 20 miles (32 km) northeast of Le Havre, on the D52 road.

== Heraldry ==
Arms of Vattetot-sous-Beaumont	The arms of the commune of Vattetot-sous-Beaumont are blazoned : Per pale ermine and gules, a 3-peaked mount (NOT issuant from base), and in chief on an inescutcheon argent, a cross vert.

== Population ==
Historical population
Year	Pop.	±% p.a.
1968	345	—
1975	279	−2.99%
1982	361	+3.75%
1990	484	+3.73%
1999	490	+0.14%
2007	533	+1.06%
2012	577	+1.60%
2017	576	−0.03%
2023	586	+0.29%
Source: INSEE

== Places of interest ==
- The church of Notre-Dame, dating from the thirteenth century.
- The thirteenth-century Bailleul manorhouse.

== See also ==
- Communes of the Seine-Maritime department
