= Épretot =

- Commune
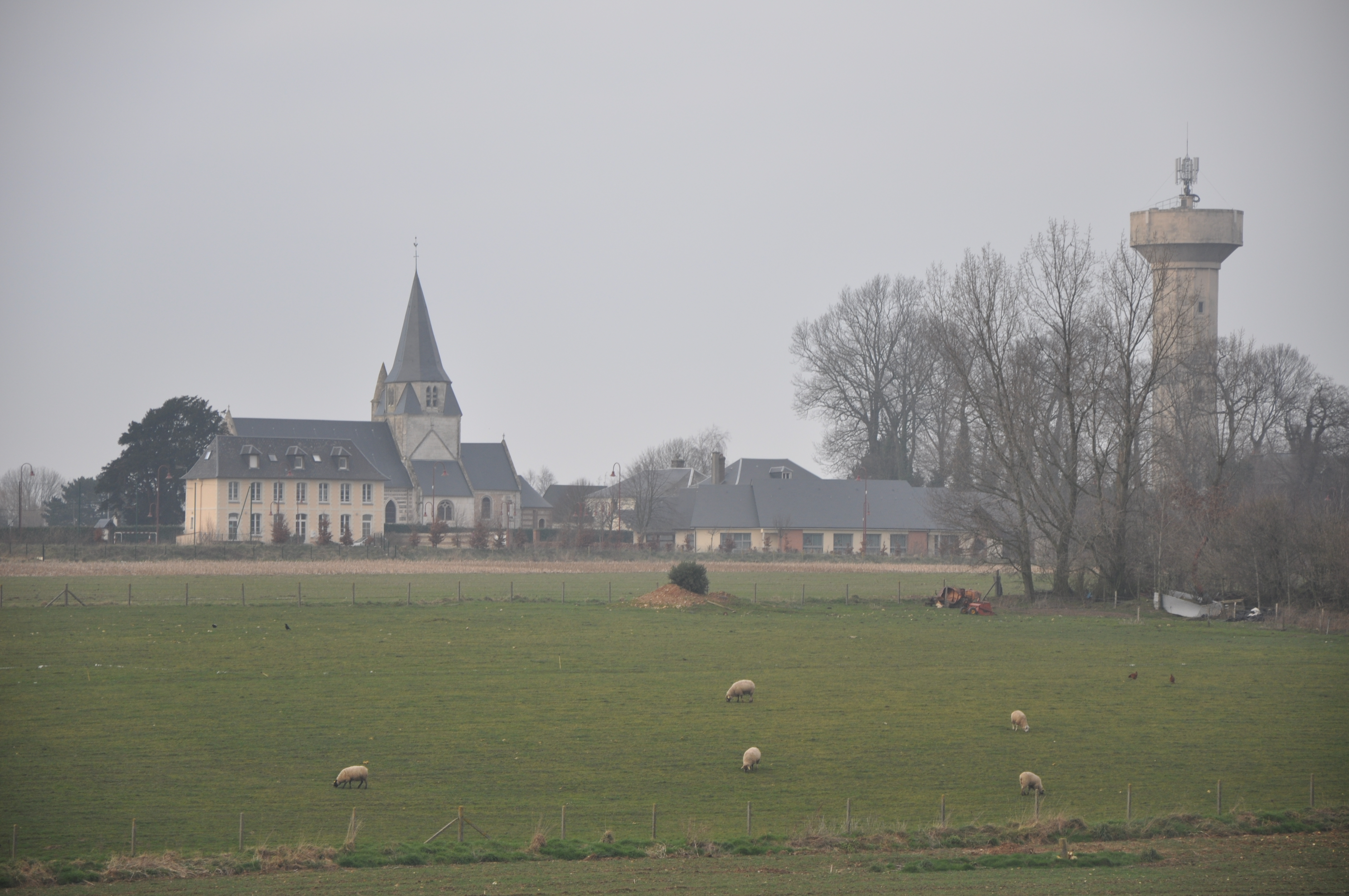
- Around the church

- Coat of arms
- Location of Épretot
- Location within France Location within Normandy
- Coordinates: 49°32′27″N 0°18′56″E
- Country: France
- Region: Normandy
- Department: Seine-Maritime
- Arrondissement: Le Havre
- Canton: Saint-Romain-de-Colbosc
- Intercommunality: Le Havre Seine Métropole

Government
  - Mayor (2020–2026): André Chalard
- Area^{1}: 6.84 km^{2} (2.64 sq mi)
- Elevation: 115 m (377 ft)
- Highest elevation: 121 m (397 ft)
- Lowest elevation: 63 m (207 ft)
- Population (2023): 782
  - Density: 114/km^{2} (296/sq mi)
- Time zone: UTC+01:00 (CET)
  - Summer (DST): UTC+02:00 (CEST)
- INSEE/Postal code: 76239 /76430
- ^{1} French Land Register data, which excludes lakes, ponds, glaciers > 1 km^{2} (0.386 sq mi or 247 acres) and river estuaries.

Épretot (French pronunciation: [epʁəto]) is a commune in the Seine-Maritime department in the Normandy region in northern France.

== Geography ==
A farming village in the Pays de Caux, situated some 12 miles (19 km) northeast of Le Havre, at the junction of the D31 and C3 roads. Junction 6 of the A29 autoroute with the D31 road is within the commune's boundary.

== Heraldry ==
Arms of Épretot	The arms of Épretot are blazoned : Quarterly argent and gules, a tree vert and boot sable, overall on a bend sinister a bell gules tongued azure between 2 angennes (roses) azure. (Note: this angenne is very rose-like, not the highly stylized cinqfoil.)

== Population ==
Historical population
Year	Pop.	±% p.a.
1968	293	—
1975	342	+2.23%
1982	361	+0.78%
1990	503	+4.23%
1999	644	+2.78%
2007	732	+1.61%
2012	721	−0.30%
2017	735	+0.39%
2023	782	+1.04%
Source: INSEE

== Places of interest ==
- The church of St. Pierre, dating from the twelfth century.

== See also ==
- Communes of the Seine-Maritime department
