= Angoville =

Angoville may refer to:

- Angoville, Calvados, a commune in the Calvados département
- Angoville-au-Plain, a commune in the Manche département
- Angoville-en-Saire, a commune until 1973 when it became a part of Cosqueville
- Angoville-sur-Ay, a commune in the Manche département
