= Montigny-les-Jongleurs =

- Commune
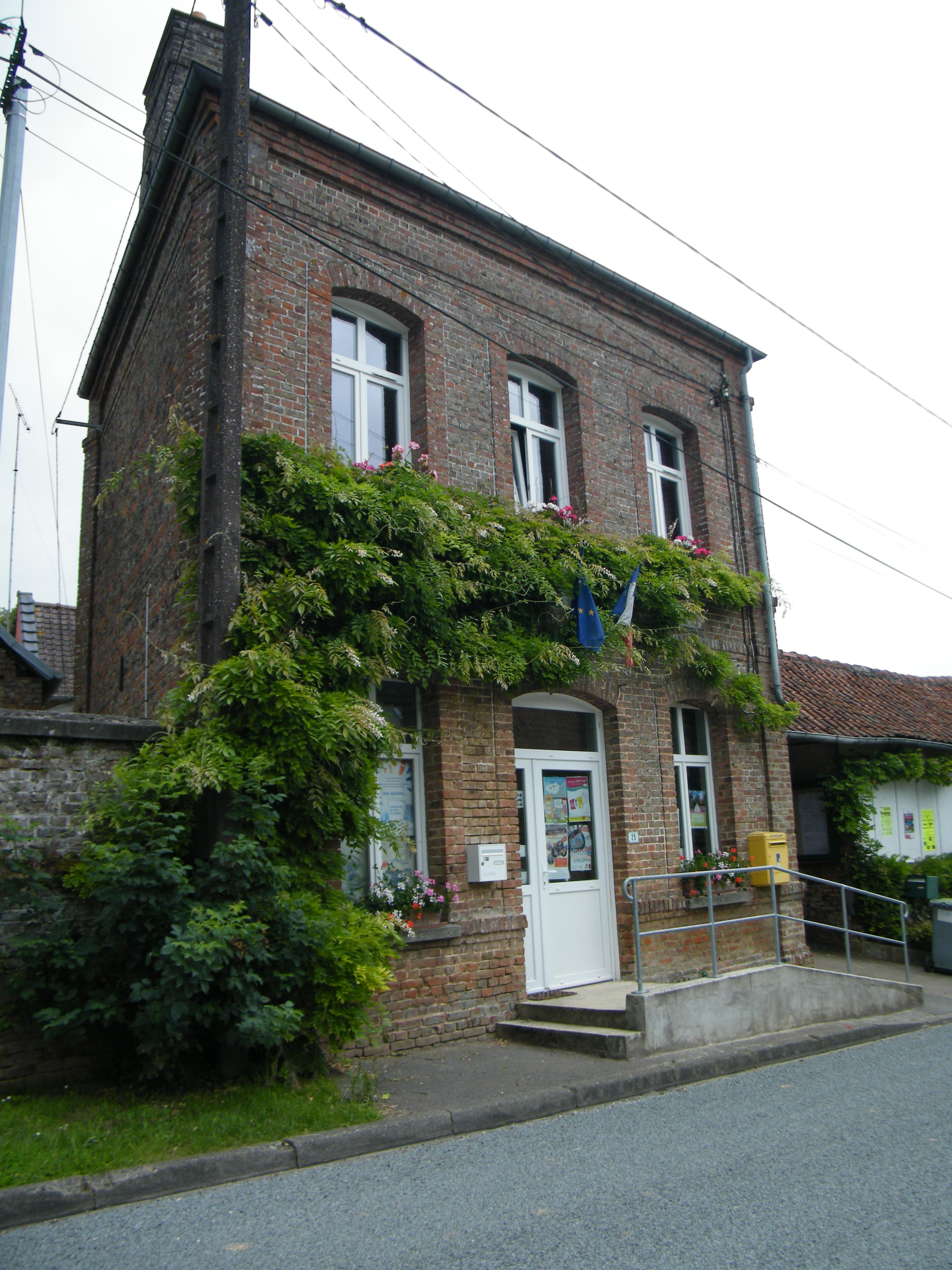
- The town hall in Montigny-les-Jongleurs
- Location of Montigny-les-Jongleurs
- Location within France Location within Hauts-de-France
- Coordinates: 50°10′53″N 2°08′04″E
- Country: France
- Region: Hauts-de-France
- Department: Somme
- Arrondissement: Amiens
- Canton: Doullens
- Intercommunality: CC Territoire Nord Picardie

Government
  - Mayor (2020–2026): Rachèle Delgove
- Area^{1}: 5 km^{2} (1.9 sq mi)
- Highest elevation: 142 m (466 ft)
- Lowest elevation: 70 m (230 ft)
- Population (2023): 102
  - Density: 20/km^{2} (53/sq mi)
- Time zone: UTC+01:00 (CET)
  - Summer (DST): UTC+02:00 (CEST)
- INSEE/Postal code: 80563 /80370
- ^{1} French Land Register data, which excludes lakes, ponds, glaciers > 1 km^{2} (0.386 sq mi or 247 acres) and river estuaries.

Montigny-les-Jongleurs (French pronunciation: [mɔ̃tiɲi le ʒɔ̃ɡlœʁ]) is a commune in the Somme department in Hauts-de-France in northern France.

== Geography ==
The commune is situated on the D230 road, 24 kilometres (15 mi) northeast of Abbeville.

== Population ==
Historical population
Year	Pop.	±% p.a.
1968	113	—
1975	114	+0.13%
1982	94	−2.72%
1990	88	−0.82%
1999	82	−0.78%
2007	75	−1.11%
2012	91	+3.94%
2017	95	+0.86%
2023	102	+1.19%
Source: INSEE

== See also ==
- Communes of the Somme department
