= Hébécourt =

Hébécourt is the name of the following communes in France:

- Hébécourt, Eure, in the Eure department
- Hébécourt, Somme, in the Somme department
