= Mondeville =

Mondeville is the name of two communes in France:

- Mondeville, Calvados, in the Calvados department;
- Mondeville, Essonne, in the Essonne department.
