= Théville =

- Commune
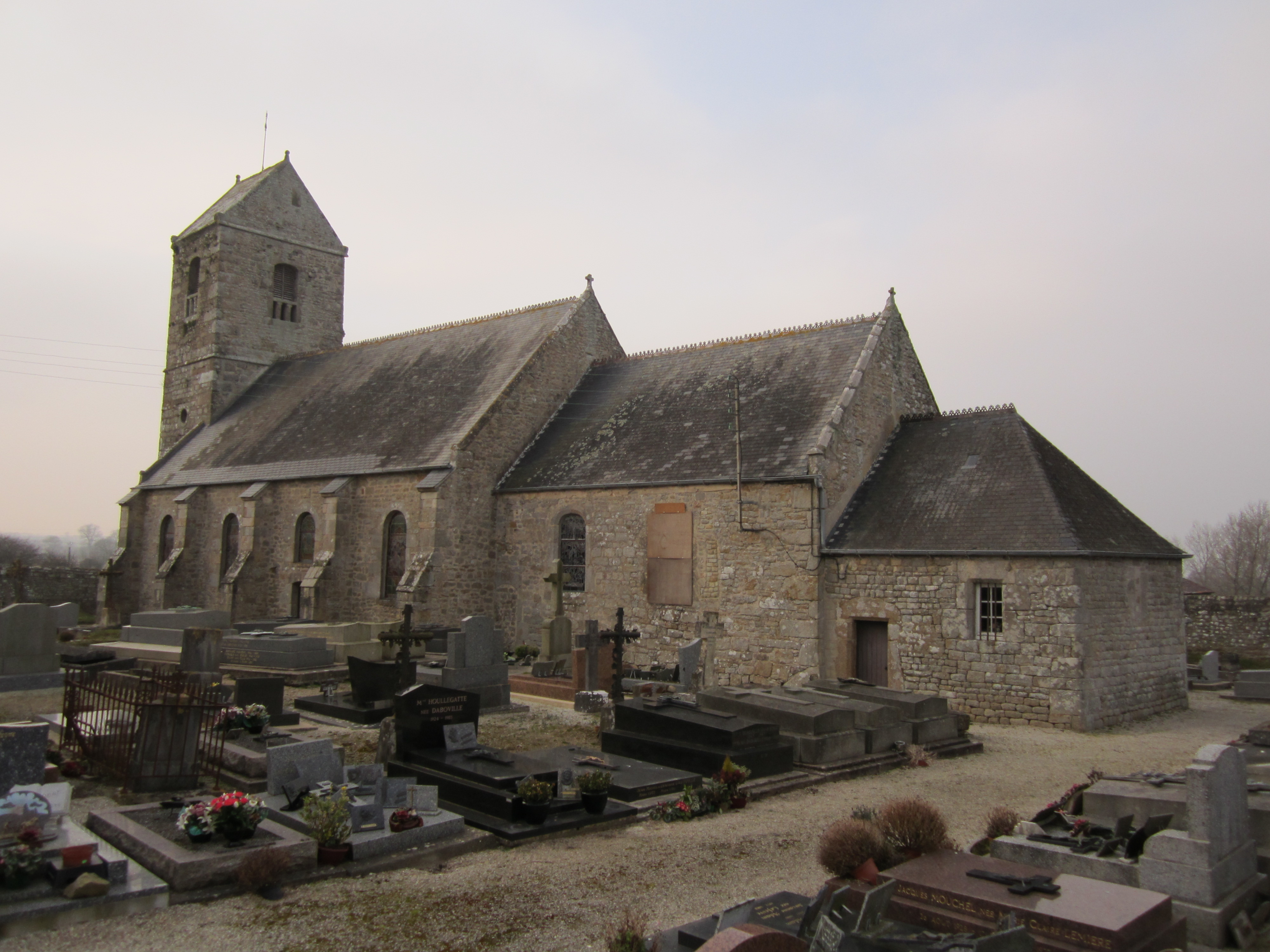
- The church of Notre-Dame
- Location of Théville
- Location within France Location within Normandy
- Coordinates: 49°39′11″N 1°25′16″W
- Country: France
- Region: Normandy
- Department: Manche
- Arrondissement: Cherbourg
- Canton: Val-de-Saire
- Intercommunality: CA Cotentin

Government
  - Mayor (2020–2026): Valérie Houllegatte
- Area^{1}: 7.77 km^{2} (3.00 sq mi)
- Elevation: 100 m (330 ft)
- Highest elevation: 136 m (446 ft)
- Lowest elevation: 59 m (194 ft)
- Population (2023): 310
  - Density: 40/km^{2} (100/sq mi)
- Time zone: UTC+01:00 (CET)
  - Summer (DST): UTC+02:00 (CEST)
- INSEE/Postal code: 50596 /50330
- ^{1} French Land Register data, which excludes lakes, ponds, glaciers > 1 km^{2} (0.386 sq mi or 247 acres) and river estuaries.

Théville (French pronunciation: [tevil]) is a commune in the Manche department in Normandy in north-western France. The inhabitants are called Thévillais.

== See also ==
- Communes of the Manche department
