= Épreville =

- Commune
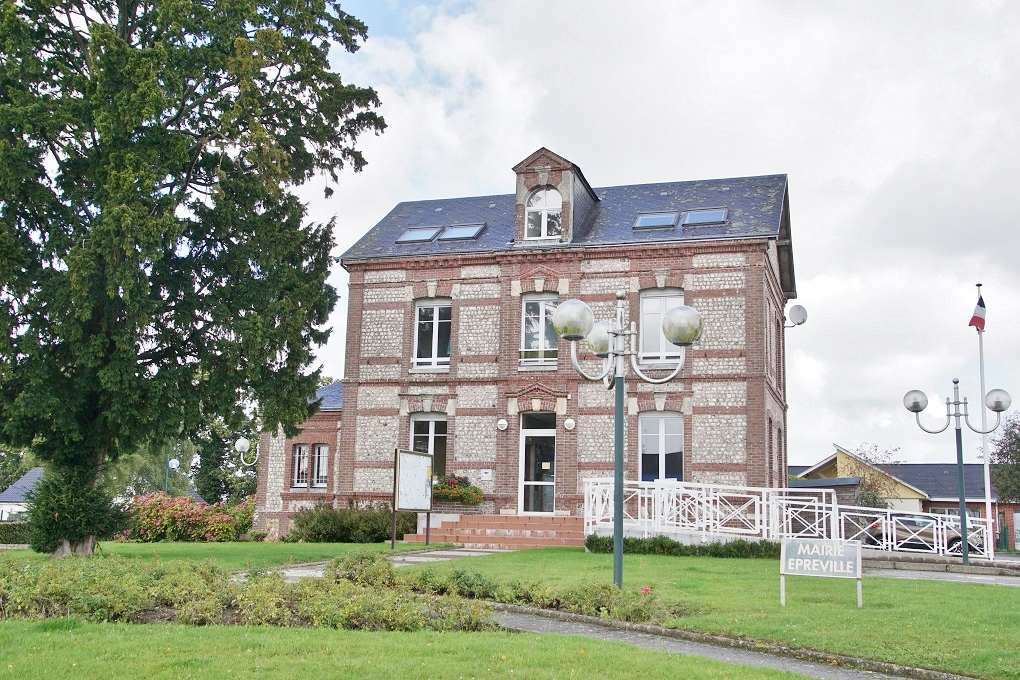
- The town hall in Épreville
- Location of Épreville
- Location within France Location within Normandy
- Coordinates: 49°42′28″N 0°22′03″E
- Country: France
- Region: Normandy
- Department: Seine-Maritime
- Arrondissement: Le Havre
- Canton: Fécamp
- Intercommunality: CA Fécamp Caux Littoral

Government
  - Mayor (2026–32): Pascal Donnet
- Area^{1}: 6.44 km^{2} (2.49 sq mi)
- Elevation: 90 m (300 ft)
- Highest elevation: 122 m (400 ft)
- Lowest elevation: 77 m (253 ft)
- Population (2023): 1,084
  - Density: 168/km^{2} (436/sq mi)
- Time zone: UTC+01:00 (CET)
  - Summer (DST): UTC+02:00 (CEST)
- INSEE/Postal code: 76240 /76400
- ^{1} French Land Register data, which excludes lakes, ponds, glaciers > 1 km^{2} (0.386 sq mi or 247 acres) and river estuaries.

Épreville (French pronunciation: [epʁəvil]) is a commune in the Seine-Maritime department in the Normandy region in northern France.

== Geography ==
A light industrial and farming village in the Pays de Caux, situated some 18 miles (29 km) northeast of Le Havre, at the junction of the D11 and D925 roads.

== Population ==
Historical population
Year	Pop.	±% p.a.
1968	564	—
1975	632	+1.64%
1982	632	+0.00%
1990	645	+0.25%
1999	762	+1.87%
2007	955	+2.86%
2012	1,049	+1.90%
2017	1,022	−0.52%
2023	1,084	+0.99%
Source: INSEE

== Places of interest ==
- The church of St. Denis, dating from the seventeenth century.
- A medieval dovecote.

== See also ==
- Communes of the Seine-Maritime department
