= Vitot =

- Commune
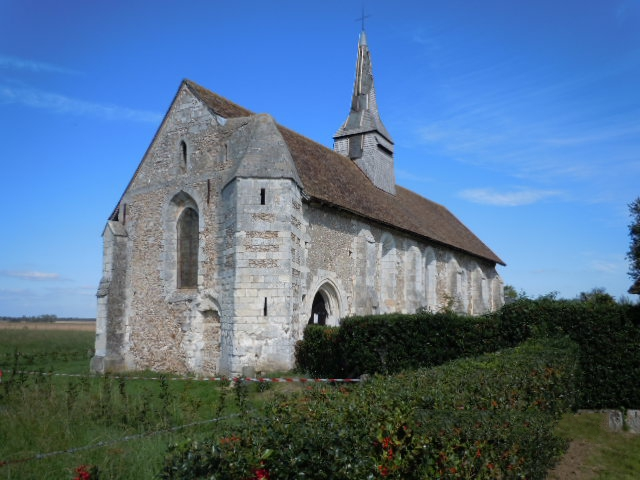
- The church in Vitot
- Location of Vitot
- Location within France Location within Normandy
- Coordinates: 49°09′50″N 0°54′07″E
- Country: France
- Region: Normandy
- Department: Eure
- Arrondissement: Bernay
- Canton: Le Neubourg

Government
  - Mayor (2020–2026): Joël Lelarge
- Area^{1}: 4.69 km^{2} (1.81 sq mi)
- Elevation: 145 m (476 ft)
- Highest elevation: 154 m (505 ft)
- Lowest elevation: 125 m (410 ft)
- Population (2023): 557
  - Density: 119/km^{2} (308/sq mi)
- Time zone: UTC+01:00 (CET)
  - Summer (DST): UTC+02:00 (CEST)
- INSEE/Postal code: 27698 /27110
- ^{1} French Land Register data, which excludes lakes, ponds, glaciers > 1 km^{2} (0.386 sq mi or 247 acres) and river estuaries.

Vitot (French pronunciation: [vito]) is a commune in the Eure department in Normandy in northern France.

== Population ==
Historical population
Year	Pop.	±% p.a.
1968	241	—
1975	282	+2.27%
1982	430	+6.21%
1990	436	+0.17%
1999	446	+0.25%
2007	479	+0.90%
2012	529	+2.01%
2017	559	+1.11%
2023	557	−0.06%
Source: INSEE

== See also ==
- Communes of the Eure department
