= Fatouville-Grestain =

- Commune
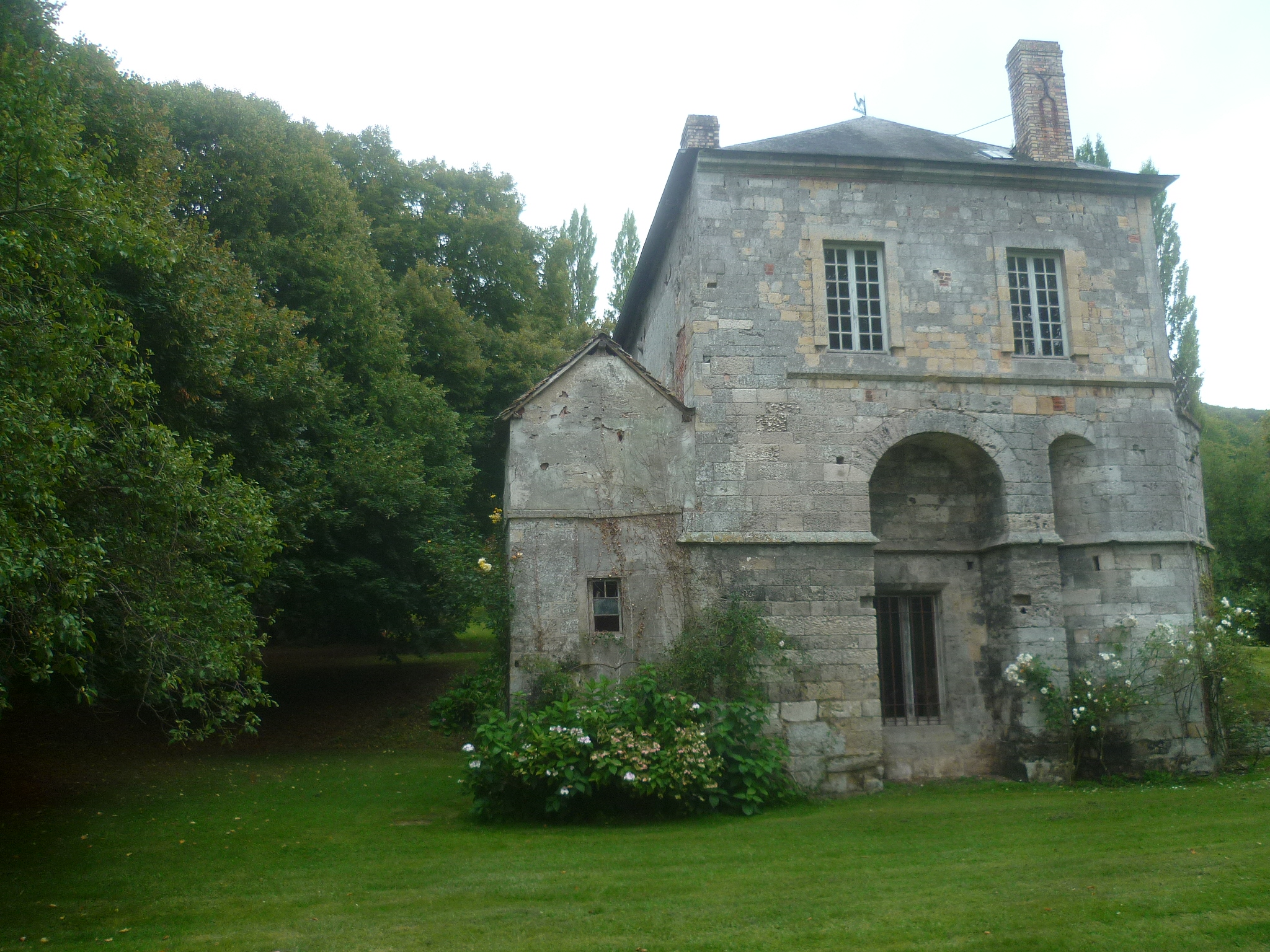
- Grestain Abbey
- Location of Fatouville-Grestain
- Location within France Location within Normandy
- Coordinates: 49°24′28″N 0°19′45″E
- Country: France
- Region: Normandy
- Department: Eure
- Arrondissement: Bernay
- Canton: Beuzeville

Government
  - Mayor (2020–2026): Brigitte Pourdieu
- Area^{1}: 10.26 km^{2} (3.96 sq mi)
- Elevation: 100 m (330 ft)
- Highest elevation: 112 m (367 ft)
- Lowest elevation: 0 m (0 ft)
- Population (2023): 701
  - Density: 68.3/km^{2} (177/sq mi)
- Time zone: UTC+01:00 (CET)
  - Summer (DST): UTC+02:00 (CEST)
- INSEE/Postal code: 27233 /27210
- ^{1} French Land Register data, which excludes lakes, ponds, glaciers > 1 km^{2} (0.386 sq mi or 247 acres) and river estuaries.

Fatouville-Grestain is a commune in the Eure department in the Normandy region in northern France.

== Population ==
Historical population
Year	Pop.	±% p.a.
1968	361	—
1975	406	+1.69%
1982	494	+2.84%
1990	507	+0.33%
1999	536	+0.62%
2007	689	+3.19%
2012	753	+1.79%
2017	746	−0.19%
2023	701	−1.03%
Source: INSEE

== See also ==
- Communes of the Eure department
- Article on the medieval entrance towers to La Pommeraye at Grestain, with images
