= Amfreville-les-Champs, Eure =

Amfreville-les-Champs
- Commune
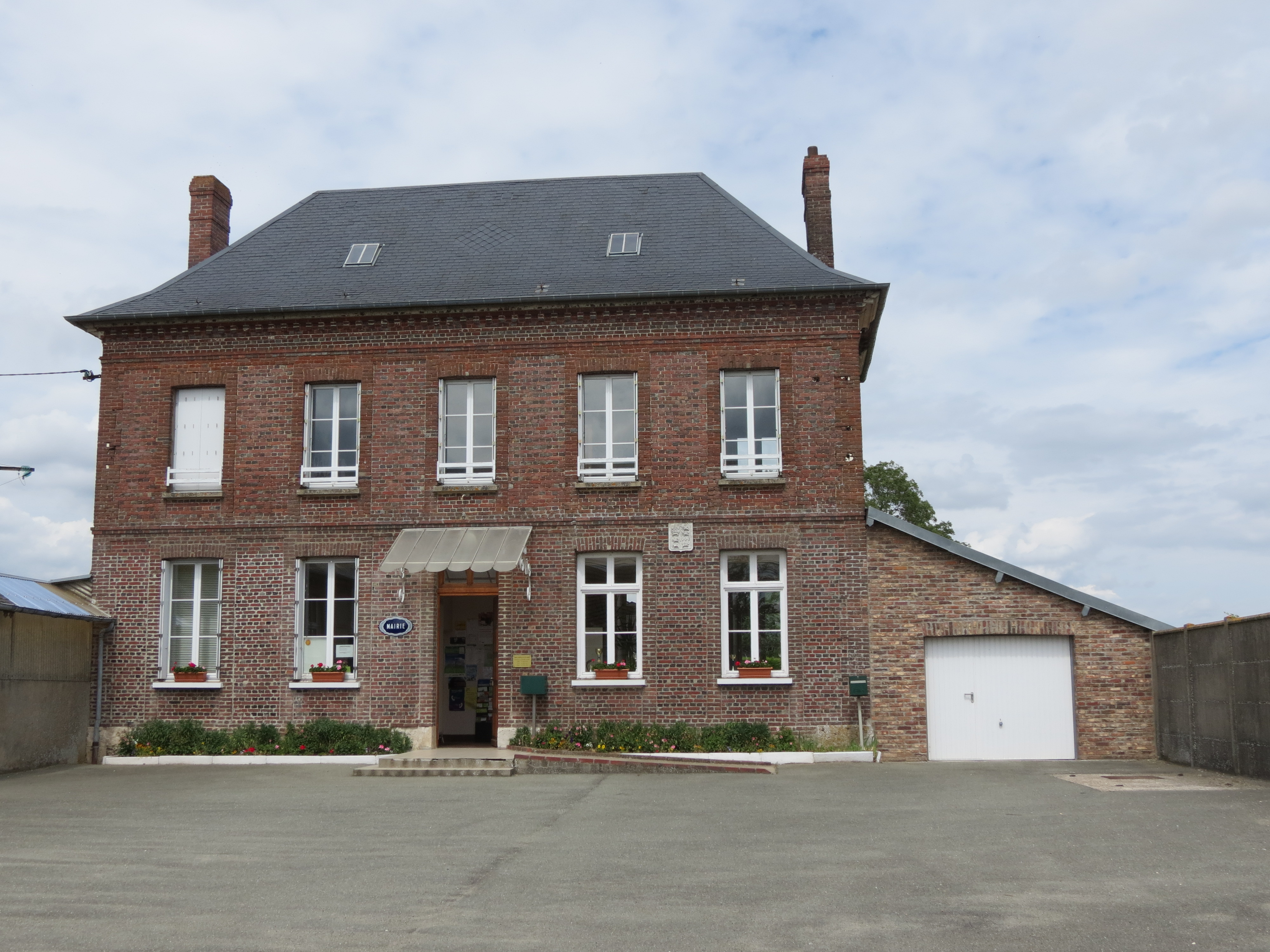
- The town hall in Amfreville-les-Champs

- Coat of arms
- Location of Amfreville-les-Champs
- Location within France Location within Normandy
- Coordinates: 49°18′40″N 1°19′15″E
- Country: France
- Region: Normandy
- Department: Eure
- Arrondissement: Les Andelys
- Canton: Romilly-sur-Andelle
- Intercommunality: Lyons Andelle

Government
  - Mayor (2020–2026): Joël Cordier
- Area^{1}: 6.56 km^{2} (2.53 sq mi)
- Elevation: 136 m (446 ft)
- Highest elevation: 154 m (505 ft)
- Lowest elevation: 70 m (230 ft)
- Population (2023): 449
  - Density: 68.4/km^{2} (177/sq mi)
- Time zone: UTC+01:00 (CET)
  - Summer (DST): UTC+02:00 (CEST)
- INSEE/Postal code: 27012 /27380
- ^{1} French Land Register data, which excludes lakes, ponds, glaciers > 1 km^{2} (0.386 sq mi or 247 acres) and river estuaries.

Amfreville-les-Champs (French pronunciation: [ɑ̃fʁəvil le ʃɑ̃]) is a commune in the Eure department in Normandy in northern France.

== Population ==
Historical population
Year	Pop.	±% p.a.
1968	183	—
1975	221	+2.73%
1982	269	+2.85%
1990	286	+0.77%
1999	342	+2.01%
2007	409	+2.26%
2012	460	+2.38%
2017	453	−0.31%
2023	449	−0.15%
Source: INSEE

== See also ==
- Communes of the Eure department
