= Touffreville-la-Corbeline =

- Commune
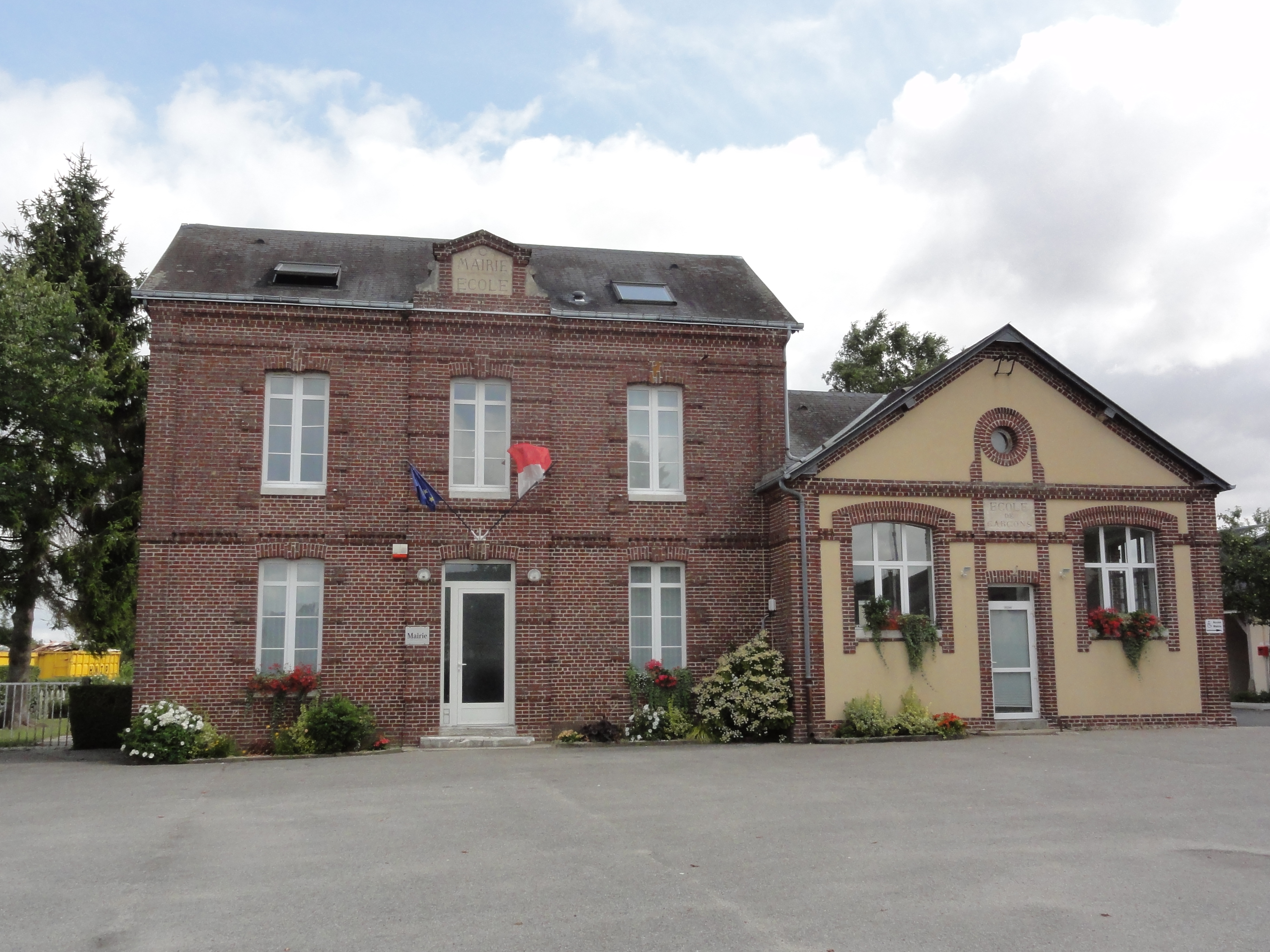
- Touffreville-la-Corbeline Town hall

- Coat of arms
- Location of Touffreville-la-Corbeline
- Location within France Location within Normandy
- Coordinates: 49°34′54″N 0°45′51″E
- Country: France
- Region: Normandy
- Department: Seine-Maritime
- Arrondissement: Rouen
- Canton: Yvetot

Government
  - Mayor (2026–32): Gilles Cottey
- Area^{1}: 12.59 km^{2} (4.86 sq mi)
- Elevation: 145 m (476 ft)
- Highest elevation: 142 m (466 ft)
- Lowest elevation: 29 m (95 ft)
- Population (2023): 842
  - Density: 66.9/km^{2} (173/sq mi)
- Time zone: UTC+01:00 (CET)
  - Summer (DST): UTC+02:00 (CEST)
- INSEE/Postal code: 76702 /76190
- ^{1} French Land Register data, which excludes lakes, ponds, glaciers > 1 km^{2} (0.386 sq mi or 247 acres) and river estuaries.

Touffreville-la-Corbeline (French pronunciation: [tufʁəvil la kɔʁbəlin]) is a commune in the Seine-Maritime department in the Normandy region in northern France.

== Geography ==
A farming village situated in the Pays de Caux, some 22 miles (35 km) northwest of Rouen at the junction of the D104, D37 and the D131 roads.

== Heraldry ==
Arms of Touffreville-la-Corbeline	The arms of Touffreville-la-Corbeline are blazoned : Azure, 2 weavers shuttles in saltire argent between a bezant, 2 oak leaves and a garb [of wheat] Or.

== Population ==
Historical population
Year	Pop.	±% p.a.
1968	586	—
1975	614	+0.67%
1982	664	+1.12%
1990	789	+2.18%
1999	804	+0.21%
2007	777	−0.43%
2012	795	+0.46%
2017	826	+0.77%
2023	842	+0.32%
Source: INSEE

== Places of interest ==
- The church of St. Martin, dating from the twelfth century.
- Remains of a feudal castle at Bois-de-la-Salle.
- Two chateaux, at Verbosc and Bourg-Naudin.
- A chapel at Verbosc.

== See also ==
- Communes of the Seine-Maritime department
