= Sotteville-sous-le-Val =

- Commune
- Location of Sotteville-sous-le-Val
- Location within France Location within Normandy
- Coordinates: 49°19′16″N 1°07′30″E
- Country: France
- Region: Normandy
- Department: Seine-Maritime
- Arrondissement: Rouen
- Canton: Caudebec-lès-Elbeuf
- Intercommunality: Métropole Rouen Normandie

Government
  - Mayor (2026–32): Sandrine Bruny
- Area^{1}: 5.27 km^{2} (2.03 sq mi)
- Elevation: 25 m (82 ft)
- Highest elevation: 84 m (276 ft)
- Lowest elevation: 4 m (13 ft)
- Population (2023): 812
  - Density: 154/km^{2} (399/sq mi)
- Time zone: UTC+01:00 (CET)
  - Summer (DST): UTC+02:00 (CEST)
- INSEE/Postal code: 76682 /76410
- ^{1} French Land Register data, which excludes lakes, ponds, glaciers > 1 km^{2} (0.386 sq mi or 247 acres) and river estuaries.

Sotteville-sous-le-Val (French pronunciation: [sɔtvil su lə val]) is a commune in the Seine-Maritime department in the Normandy region in northern France.

== Geography ==
A farming village situated in a meander of the river Seine, some 10 miles (16 km) south of Rouen at the junction of the D91, D92 and the D292 roads. The A13 autoroute runs through the commune's territory.

== Population ==
Historical population
Year	Pop.	±% p.a.
1968	297	—
1975	316	+0.89%
1982	470	+5.84%
1990	524	+1.37%
1999	577	+1.08%
2007	726	+2.91%
2012	773	+1.26%
2017	791	+0.46%
2023	812	+0.44%
Source: INSEE

== Places of interest ==
- The church of St. Baudèle, dating from the eleventh century.
- The seventeenth-century chateau of Val-Freneuse, with its chapel and park.
- A seventeenth-century manorhouse.
- A twelfth-century stone cross.

== See also ==
- Communes of the Seine-Maritime department
