= Risby =

Risby may refer to:

== Places ==
- Risby, East Riding of Yorkshire, England
- Risby, Lincolnshire, England
- Risby, Suffolk, England

== People ==
- Andrew Risby
- Marie Risby
- Baron Risby
- Richard Risby

== See also ==
- High Risby, North Lincolnshire, England
- Low Risby, North Lincolnshire, England
