= Vattetot-sur-Mer =

- Commune
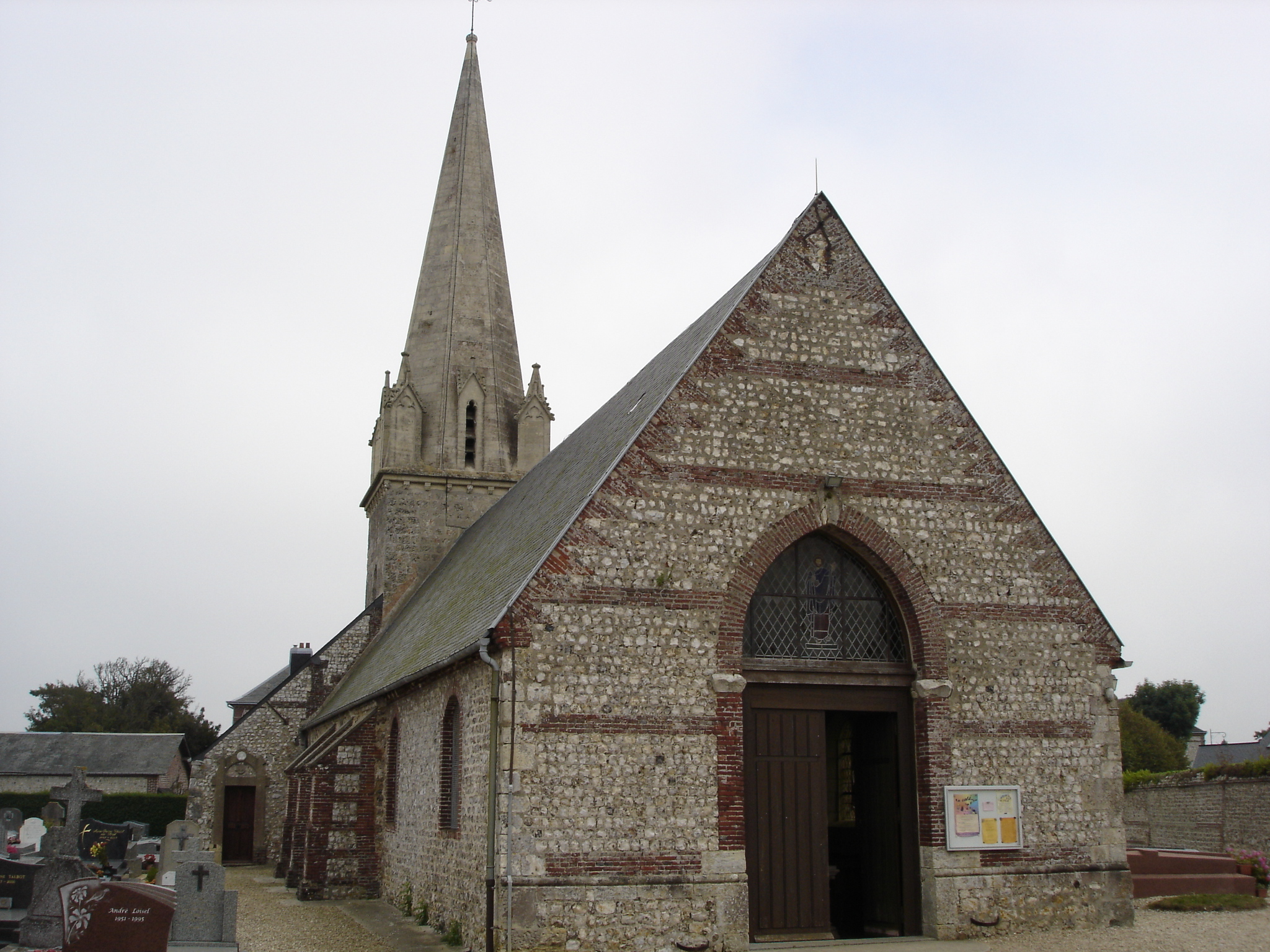
- The church in Vattetot-sur-Mer
- Location of Vattetot-sur-Mer
- Location within France Location within Normandy
- Coordinates: 49°43′40″N 0°16′53″E
- Country: France
- Region: Normandy
- Department: Seine-Maritime
- Arrondissement: Le Havre
- Canton: Fécamp
- Intercommunality: CA Fécamp Caux Littoral

Government
  - Mayor (2026–32): Stéphanie Cayeux
- Area^{1}: 5.14 km^{2} (1.98 sq mi)
- Elevation: 90 m (300 ft)
- Highest elevation: 109 m (358 ft)
- Lowest elevation: 0 m (0 ft)
- Population (2023): 328
  - Density: 63.8/km^{2} (165/sq mi)
- Time zone: UTC+01:00 (CET)
  - Summer (DST): UTC+02:00 (CEST)
- INSEE/Postal code: 76726 /76111
- ^{1} French Land Register data, which excludes lakes, ponds, glaciers > 1 km^{2} (0.386 sq mi or 247 acres) and river estuaries.

Vattetot-sur-Mer is a commune in the Seine-Maritime department in the Normandy region in northern France.

== Geography ==
A small farming village and tourist spot on the coast of the Pays de Caux, situated some 22 miles (35 km) northeast of Le Havre, at the junction of the D11 and D211 roads. Imposing limestone cliffs look out onto the English Channel.

== Population ==
Historical population
Year	Pop.	±% p.a.
1968	254	—
1975	234	−1.16%
1982	239	+0.30%
1990	258	+0.96%
1999	253	−0.22%
2007	308	+2.49%
2012	326	+1.14%
2017	319	−0.43%
2023	328	+0.46%
Source: INSEE

== Places of interest ==
- The church of St. Pierre, dating from the twelfth century.

== See also ==
- Communes of the Seine-Maritime department
