= Battle of La Haye-du-Puits =

Battle during Operation Overlord

- Part of the Normandy Campaign, World War II
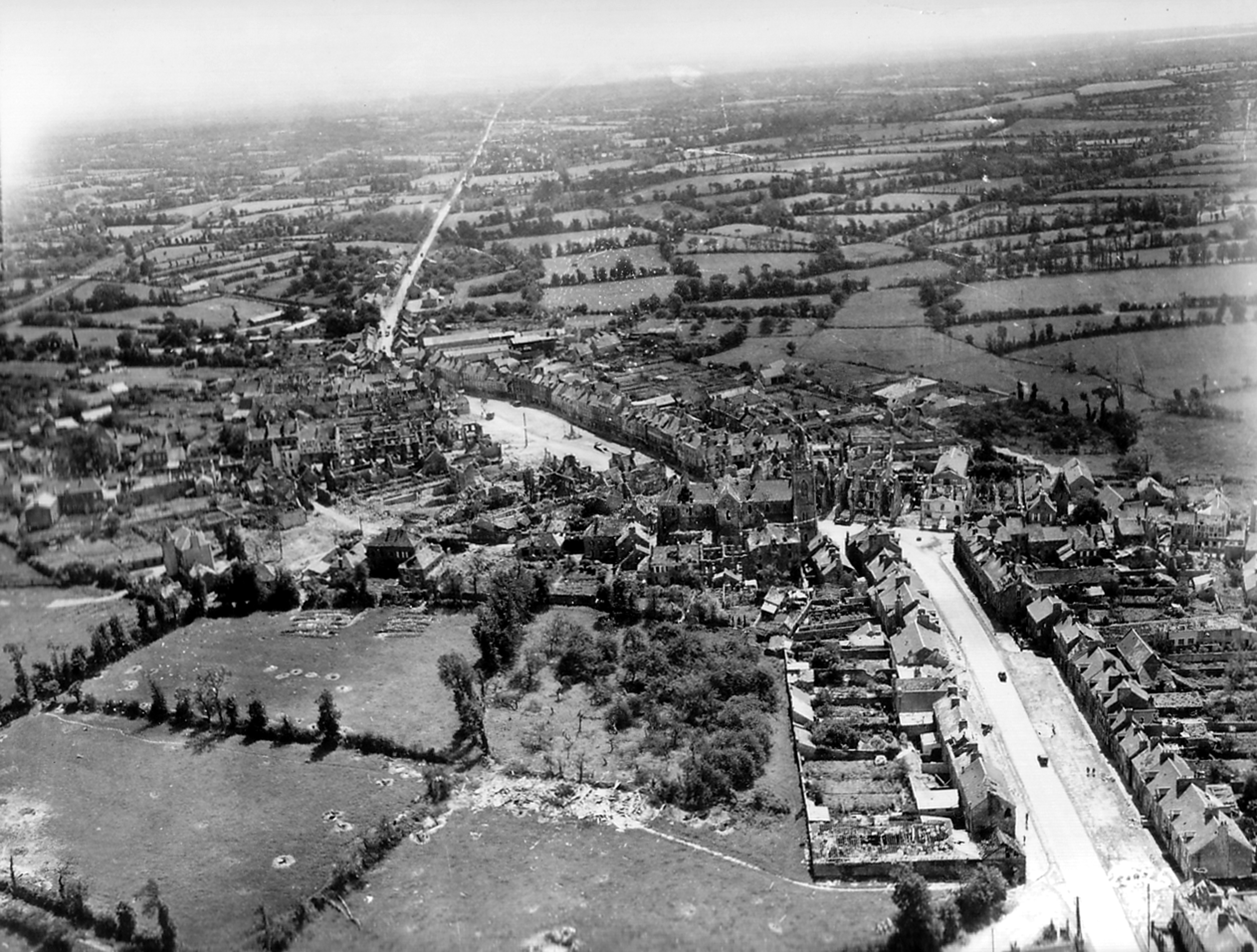
- La Haye-du-Puits, 1944
| Date | 3–14 July 1944 |
| Location | Normandy, France 49°16′21″N 1°34′10″W |
| Result | US victory |

Belligerents
| United States | Germany |

Commanders and leaders
| (United States) Troy H. Middleton | (Nazi Germany) Dietrich von Choltitz |

Units involved
| VIII Corps | LXXXIV Corps |

The Battle of La Haye-du-Puits was fought between the armies of the United States and Germany as part of the Normandy Campaign of World War II. Following the Allied invasion of Normandy on D-Day, 6 June 1944, US First Army under the command of Lieutenant General Omar Bradley began an advance to the south, aiming to break through the German defenses and secure a line from Coutances to Saint-Lô. This would help the rest of the First Army cross the swamps and bocage, and put the American front on firm and dry ground more suitable for the employment of mechanized forces. Although the battle was costly for the Americans, it was also costly for the Germans; by wearing down their forces, it paved the way for Operation Cobra on 25 July, which broke through the German defenses.

The most striking geographical feature of the area was the bocage, earthen embankments topped with small trees and tangled underbrush and vines, separated by sunken lanes. The hedgerows provided cover, camouflage and concealment to the German defenders, which reduced the effectiveness of American artillery. Small detachments defended each field. The terrain favoured the defense, and the German LXXXIV Corps under the command of Generalleutnant Dietrich von Choltitz effectively utilized the bocage with defensive tactics. The German Seventh Army commander, SS-Obergruppenführer Paul Hausser, echeloned his forces in a defense in depth, manning the forward area lightly with prepared fallback defensive positions, and hoarded the bulk of his troops, tanks and assault guns for counter-attacks.

Between 5 and 14 July, the American troops of the VIII Corps under the command of Major General Troy H. Middleton's pushed southward through forest, swamps and bocage to capture the high ground around La Haye-du-Puits. The advance was bitterly contested. The 82nd Airborne Division achieved some success, taking the key positions of Hill 131 and La Poterie ridge. The 79th Infantry Division captured Hill 121 and make progress towards Montgardon ridge. The 90th Infantry Division fought through heavy German resistance to capture Mont Castre ridge and advance towards Périers. The 8th Infantry Division captured the ridge overlooking the Ay River. The Americans reached their objective, the Sèves River, on 14 July.

== Background ==
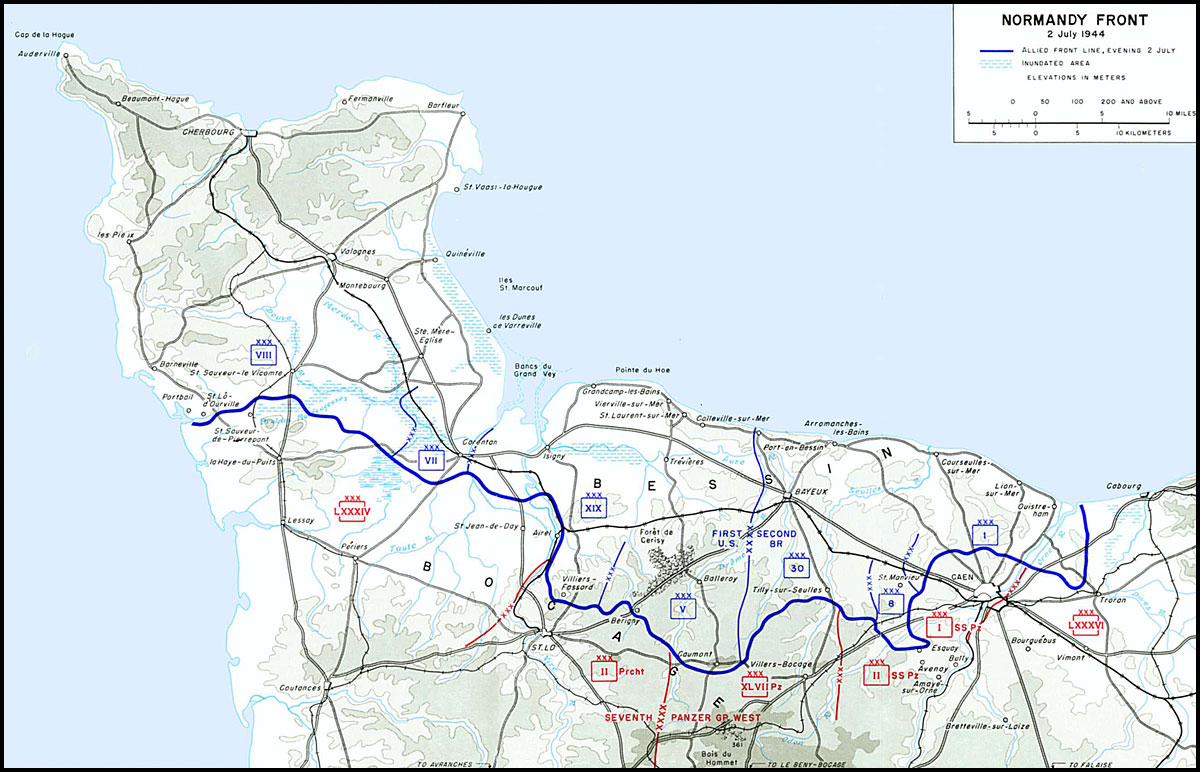
Cotentin Peninsula, 2 July 1944

Following the successful Allied invasion of Normandy on D-Day, 6 June 1944, progress was slow. The original plan for the campaign envisioned the British Second Army under the command of Lieutenant-General Miles Dempsey in the east securing Caen and the area to the south of it to acquire airfields and protect the left flank. Meanwhile, the First US Army under the command of Lieutenant General Omar Bradley in the west was to capture the deep water port of Cherbourg by D plus 15 (15 days after D-Day), and advance south to the Loire valley by D plus 20. The American forces would then turn west to clear Brittany and capture the ports there, before heading east to the Seine, which was expected would be reached by D plus 90. This would conclude the first phase of Operation Overlord.

Before D-Day, the German commanders had disagreed on the correct way to handle the anticipated Allied invasion, with Generalfeldmarschall Erwin Rommel, the commander of Army Group B favoring a forward defence, while his superior, Generalfeldmarschall Gerd von Rundstedt, the commander of Oberbefehlshaber West (OB West), favored a mobile one. In the end, neither was fully adopted. Afterwards they agreed on containing the Allied advance while massing their forces for a counter-attack, but the British Operation Epsom attack near Caen on 25 June forced them to deploy their reserves in that sector. On 29 June, a new strategy was adopted: containing the Allied forces in Normandy where the terrain favored the defense, and the Allied ability to maneuver their mobile forces was restricted.

Successive Anglo-Canadian offensives failed to take Caen, but they kept the best of the German forces in Normandy, including most of the armor, in this area. With no ports in Allied hands, all reinforcements and supplies arrived over the beaches or via two "Mulberry" artificial harbors. On 19 June, a storm descended on the English Channel that lasted for three days, destroyed the American Mulberry, and caused significant delays to the Allied build-up. In the west, Bradley halted attacks to the south before the town of Saint-Lô, in order to concentrate on the capture of Cherbourg. Cherbourg fell on 26 June, and organized German resistance in the northern Cotentin Peninsula ended on 1 July.

The First US Army's next task after the capture of Cherbourg was to head south towards the Loire. The US VIII Corps, under the command of Major General Troy H. Middleton was ordered to make a quick 20-mile (32 km) advance to Coutances. This would help the rest of the First Army cross the swamps and bocage, and put the entire American front on firm and dry ground more suitable for the employment of mechanized forces. The ground in front of the VIII Corps formed a 7-mile (11 km) sector between the Prairies Marécageuses de Gorges and the tidal flats of the Ay River. American activity in this sector had been restricted due to ammunition shortages, with priority being given to the capture of Cherbourg.

The Supreme Allied Commander, General Dwight D. Eisenhower, wanted Bradley to commence the operation as soon as possible in order to prevent the Germans from consolidating their position. Not all the American forces were in position, with many still in the north or yet to arrive from the UK, so Bradley elected to commit them piecemeal rather than wait. The advance would begin on his western flank; since the forces there had further to advance than those around Saint-Lô, all might reach the objective at the same time.

== Opposing forces ==
=== United States ===
For the attack, Middleton had three divisions, all of which had participated in the June fighting in Normandy. The 79th Infantry Division, under the command of Major General Ira T. Wyche, would advance west of La Haye-du-Puits in a southerly direction, seizing Montgardon ridge and Hill 121. Meanwhile, the 90th Infantry Division would advance to the east of La Haye-du-Puits in a southwesterly direction and capture Mont Castre. The two attacks would converge to the south of Mont Castre. The choice of the 90th Infantry Division was problematic: it had performed poorly in the early fighting, and its commander, Brigadier General Jay W. MacKelvie, had been relieved and replaced by Brigadier General Eugene M. Landrum.

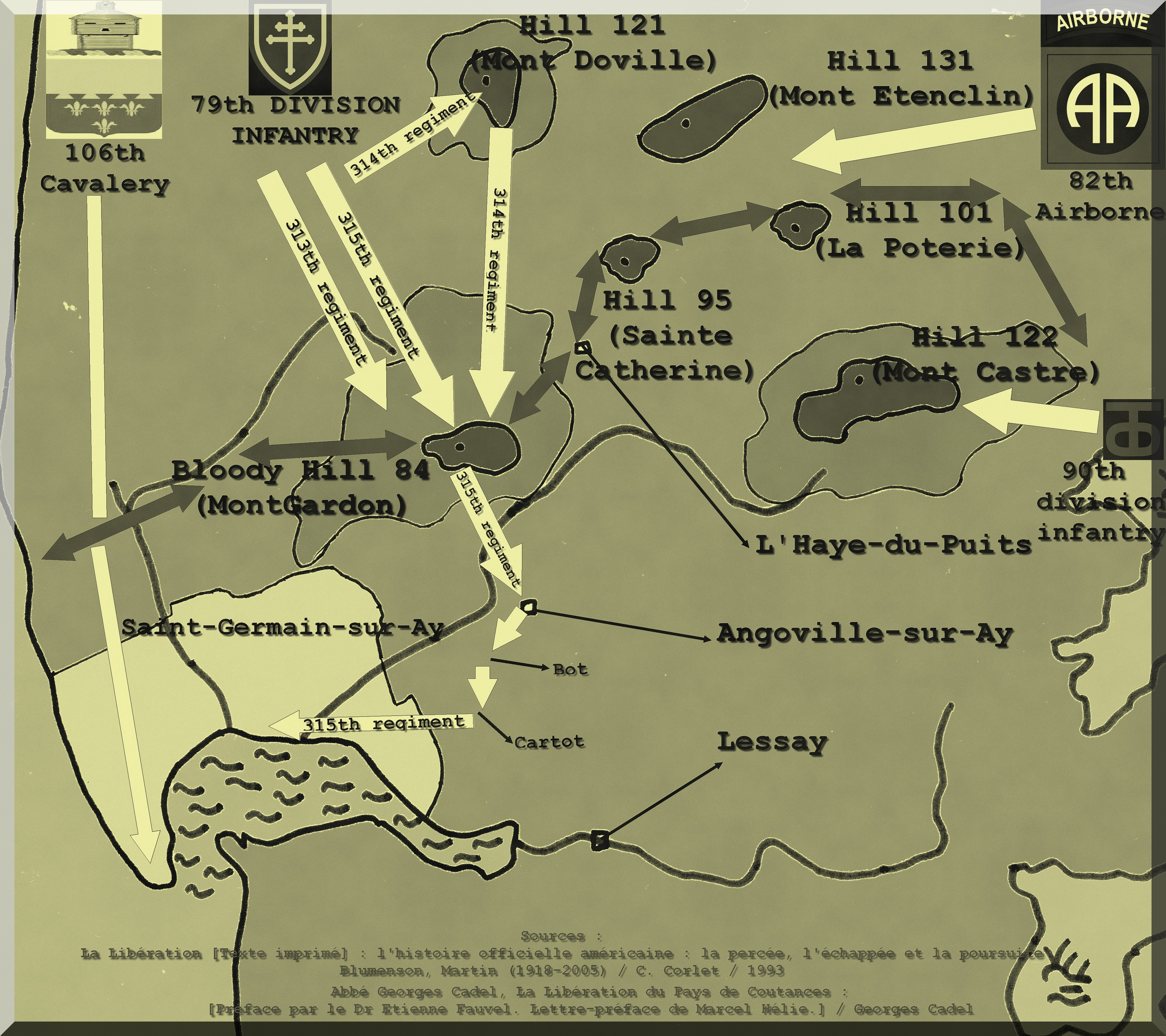
Battle of La Haye-du-Puits

Major General Matthew B. Ridgway's 82nd Airborne Division, was the most experienced of the three, having seen action in Sicily and Italy, and American airborne troops had higher physical and mental standards than regular infantry. Nonetheless, it was given the least demanding assignment because it was scheduled to soon return to the UK to participate in upcoming airborne operations. It was due to be replaced by the 8th Infantry Division, but that formation did not arrive in Normandy until 3 July, and it had not yet been in combat. The 82nd Airborne Division's mission was to seize the high ground to the north, consisting of Hill 131 and the three hills of the Poterie ridge. As the other two divisions advanced, it would be pinched out of the line.

To support the attack, Middleton had nine battalions of medium and heavy artillery, including two battalions of 240 mm howitzers, and the temporary assistance of four battalions of the neighboring VII Corps Artillery. Air support was also available. First Army had been rationing artillery ammunition, but stocks were considered adequate for the attack, and restrictions were temporarily lifted, with the caveat that excessive expenditure would result in their reimposition. It was expected that the battle would not last for more than two days.

The VIII Corps military intelligence staff was confident that the attack would be successful. The German forces were known to be understrength and short of ammunition and equipment. A counter-attack or staunch defense was not considered likely. German morale was rated as poor to fair; while German patrol activity had increased in the VIII Corps sector, the patrols had not been aggressive. In the days leading up to the attack, it was noted that German artillery had become more active, and small arms, automatic weapons and mortar fire had increased, indicating a higher level of alertness. The hitherto sporadic use of German ammunition had been interpreted as a conservation measure, and the increased activity was taken as a sign that the Germans were preparing to withdraw.

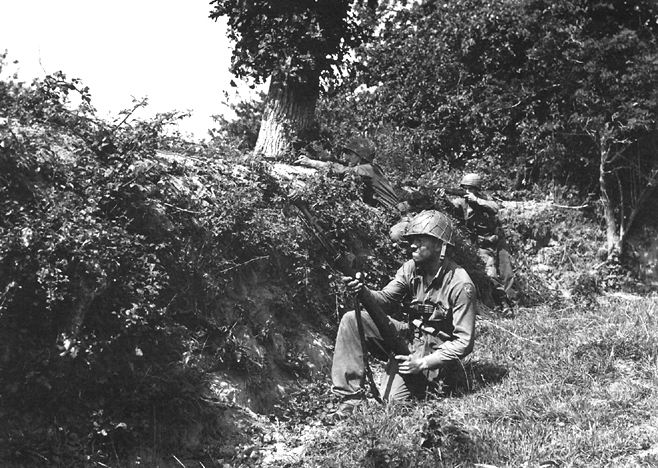
American soldiers near a hedgerow in Normandy

The basic weapon of the American infantryman was the M1 Garand, a semi-automatic rifle. Each American infantry squad had twelve men, of whom ten were equipped with Garands. One had the older, bolt-action M1903 Springfield, which was used as a sniper rifle, and one carried an M1918 Browning automatic rifle (BAR). Three squads formed a platoon, and three platoons, a small headquarters and a weapons platoon made up a rifle company with a strength of 6 officers and 187 enlisted men. The weapons platoon was equipped with two M1919 Browning machine guns, a Browning .50 caliber machine gun, three 60 mm mortars and three 2.36 in rocket launchers, commonly known as bazookas.

Three rifle companies and a heavy weapons company formed a battalion, and three battalions, an anti-tank company, a cannon company and a service company formed an infantry regiment. The infantry division had three regiments, which were supported by four field artillery battalions, three of which were equipped with twelve 105 mm howitzers and one with 155 mm howitzers. The Germans considered the American artillery to be extremely effective, but its true power lay not in its caliber or their number, but in effective communications and fire control.

The American infantry division did not possess an organic tank battalion. Instead, there was a pool of separate tank battalions that could be attached to infantry divisions, individually or in groups. This was based on doctrine that the main role of armor was for exploitation, and that they were best used massed together. The separate tank battalions had the same organization as those of the armored divisions, with three medium tank companies equipped with 17 M-4 Sherman tanks, and a light tank company equipped with M5 Stuart tanks. Nonetheless, they were considered inferior in training to their armored division counterparts, and had a lower priority for replacement officers, crewmen and spare parts.

Tank-infantry coordination was hampered by the practice of switching separate battalions between divisions. Between 12 June and 16 July 1944, the 746th Tank Battalion, for example, was attached to the 9th, 83rd and 90th Infantry Divisions. Many infantry officers had no training in working with tanks because doctrine was for them to operate separately, with either armor or infantry leading depending on the situation. The Shermans were outclassed by the heavier German Tiger I. Panzer IV and Panther tanks, which had more powerful guns and thicker armor. The main advantages of the Shermans were numbers, mechanical reliability, and rapidity of fire.

=== Germany ===
The German Seventh Army commander, SS-Obergruppenführer Paul Hausser echeloned his forces in a defense in depth, manning the forward area lightly with prepared fallback defensive positions, and hoarding the bulk of his troops, tanks and assault guns for counter-attacks. Across the base of the Cotentin Peninsula was the Prairies Marécageuses de Gorges, a swamp that stretched from Carentan to La Haye-du-Puits in the west. This formed a natural obstacle that the Germans exploited as the anchor of their main defensive position, which they called the Mahlmann Line, after Paul Mahlmann, the commander of the German 353rd Infantry Division. It ran over Mont Castre (also known as Hill 122 after its height in meters). On the southern slope of Monte Castre was the densely-wooded Foret de Mont Castre. The line then ran along the high ground around La Haye-du-Puits, and ultimately to the coast on the western side of the Contentin Peninsula. From Mont Castre, the Germans had a commanding view of the target-rich American lodgement area.

The quality of the German units, after nearly five years of war, varied considerably. Generalleutnant Hans Speidel, the chief of staff of Generalfeldmarschall Erwin Rommel's Army Group B, facing the Allied forces in Normandy, considered most German soldiers in the West to be overage, ill-equipped and led by inadequate officers and NCOs. Some were Osttruppen units composed of non-German volunteers from the Soviet Union. These were not regarded as particularly reliable.

The Mahlmann line was defended by the German LXXXIV Corps under the command of Generalleutnant Dietrich von Choltitz. The position was held in great depth. Holding front line was Group Koenig under the command of Generalleutnant Eugen Koenig, the acting commander of the German 91st Infantry Division, a battlegroup consisting of elements of the 91st, 243rd and 265th Infantry Divisions and some Osttruppen. It included the division artillery of the 243d Infantry Division, two cannon companies, five antitank companies, a tank destroyer battalion, Nebelwerfer rocket launchers and some old French light tanks. Mont Castre was defended by the 77th Infantry Division and a battlegroup of the 353rd Infantry Division, which was in the process of being redeployed to the eastern part of the LXXXIV Corps' line.

Although not part of the LXXXIV Corps, the Seventh Army had the 2nd SS Panzer Division in reserve. The 15th Parachute Regiment of 5th Parachute Division was also in the area, under the control of the German high command (Oberkommando der Wehrmacht, OKW), and could be called on in an emergency.

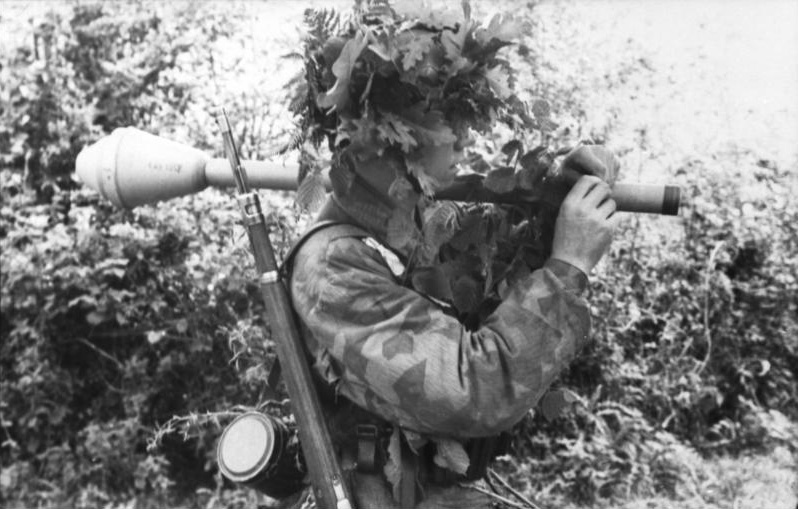
A German paratrooper in Normandy with a panzerfaust anti-tank weapon

A German infantry company consisted of two officers and 140 men. In the fighting in the bocage country the rate of fire at first contact counted for much, and a German company had three times as much firepower as the larger US ones. The standard German rifle was the bolt-action Karabiner 98k, with a slower rate of fire than the US semi-automatic M1 Garand, but German companies were generously equipped with light machine guns; though designed to be crew-served, they could in practice be operated by a single man, for example using a fifty-round belt, which the MG42 could discharge in three seconds. The German MP 40 submachine gun, known to the Americans as the "burp gun" from the sound it made, had a higher cyclic rate of fire than its American counterparts. The small-arms ammunition allocated to a German rifle company for immediate use was 56,000 rounds, compared to 21,000 to an American infantry company.

The German divisional artillery's 10.5 cm leFH 18 howitzer was similar to its American counterparts, although the batteries were less well equipped with communications. The shortcomings of German field artillery were attributable to shortages of ammunition and equipment, and to high casualties among artillery officers, rather than any deficiencies in organization or doctrine.

== Terrain ==
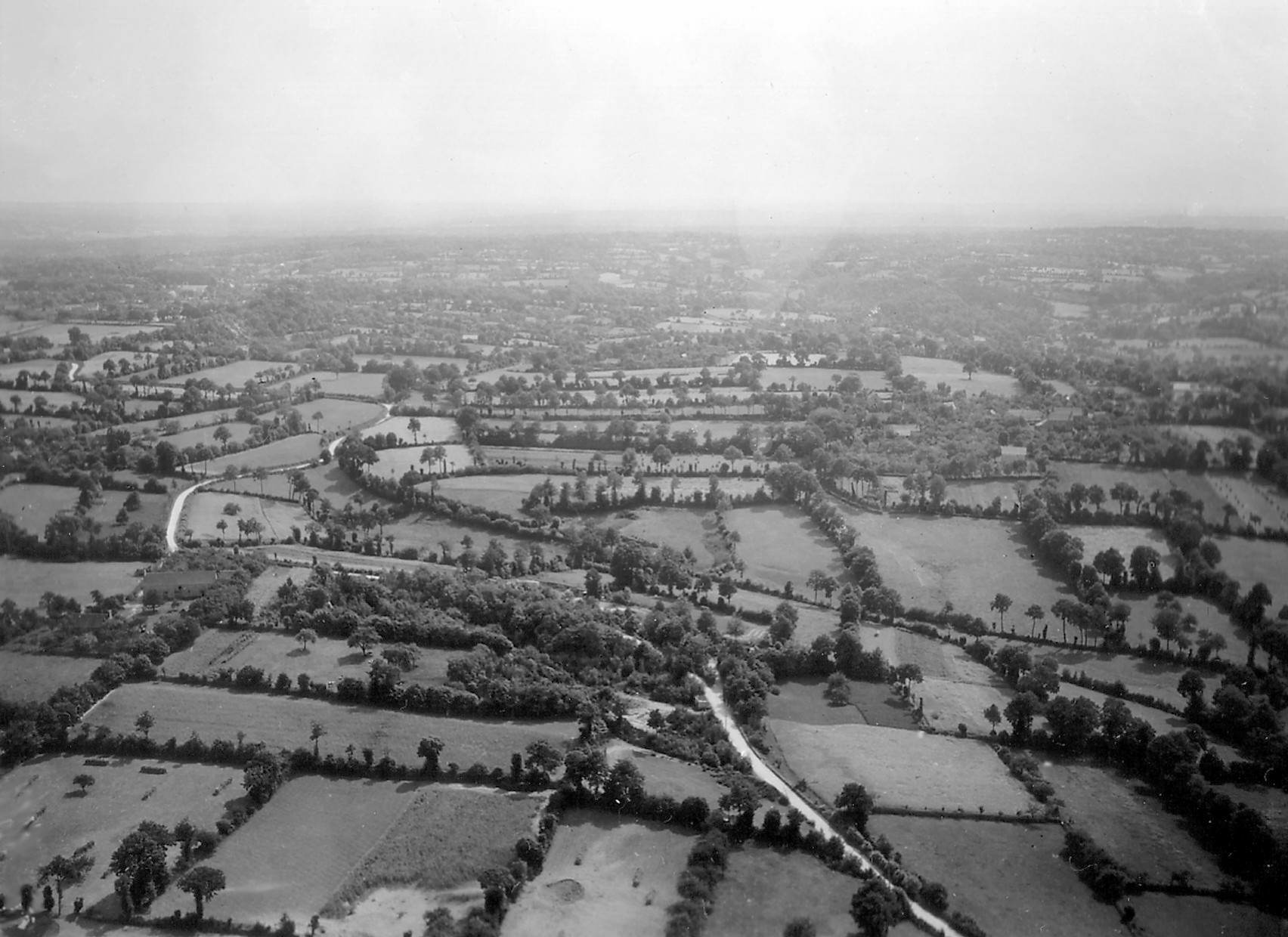
Bocage country

The battlefield was dominated by the high ground around La Haye-du-Puits, from which the German forces had good observation over the area. The low ground was soft and swampy, making movement on foot difficult and restricting most vehicle traffic to the asphalt roads, especially after heavy rains, and the summer of 1944 was the wettest since 1900. Rain and the associated low cloud ceilings often grounded fighter-bombers and observation aircraft, hampering artillery and close air support. Because 21 June is the longest day in the northern hemisphere, daylight hours were long and nights corresponding short.

The most striking geographical feature of the area was the bocage, which started about 10 miles (16 km) inland from Omaha Beach and Utah Beach where the Americans had landed on D-Day. Norman farmers had enclosed their fields with hedgerows to restrict the movement of livestock and prevent soil erosion caused by the ocean winds. These were earthen embankments from 1 to 4 feet (0.3 to 1.2 m) thick and from 3 to 15 feet (0.9 to 4.6 m) high, topped with small trees and tangled underbrush and vines. The fields were usually small, about 200 by 400 yards (180 by 370 m) in size, and irregular in shape. Each had an entrance to permit access for farming equipment and the movement of livestock. Together they formed a patchwork with no discernible pattern. The allies counted 4,000 separate fields in one eight-square-mile aerial photograph. On average in the Cotentin, a linear kilometre would cross 14 hedgerows.

The hedgerows provided cover, camouflage and concealment to the German defenders, which reduced the effectiveness of American artillery. Small detachments defended each field. Heavy machine guns were emplaced at the corners where they were dug in to the embankments, while light machine guns and machine pistols provided grazing fire parallel to the American advance. Snipers were also a key part of the defense. Field telephones connected the defensive positions and enabled the Germans to coordinate their defense and call in fire support. If the Americans went to ground in an open field, they would be attacked with pre-registered artillery and mortar fire. The latter caused around three-quarters of American casualties in the Normandy campaign. The entrances to the fields were covered by machine guns and anti-tank guns, and the hedgerows were sown with land mines and tripwire-activated booby traps. Slit trenches were dug in to the embankments to provide protection from American artillery and mortar fire. To counter American armor, the German defenders had the hand-held panzerfaust anti-tank weapon, which was deadly at close range, and they could also call on their tanks, self-propelled guns and 88 mm anti-aircraft guns. Narrow sunken lanes provided secure communications and good locations for heavy weapons.

== Battle ==
=== 3–7 July ===
==== 82nd Airborne Division ====
Rain began falling in the early morning of 3 July, and it was raining heavily by the time the artillery began its 15-minute preparatory bombardment at 05:15. The planned air support was cancelled, and even the low-flying artillery observation aircraft were grounded. The sounds of tank motors had alerted the Germans that an attack was imminent, and artillery fire was called down on likely assembly areas, but some degree of surprise was still achieved because the LXXXIV Corps staff thought that the inability of American aircraft to operate in the weather conditions would prompt a postponement of the attack.

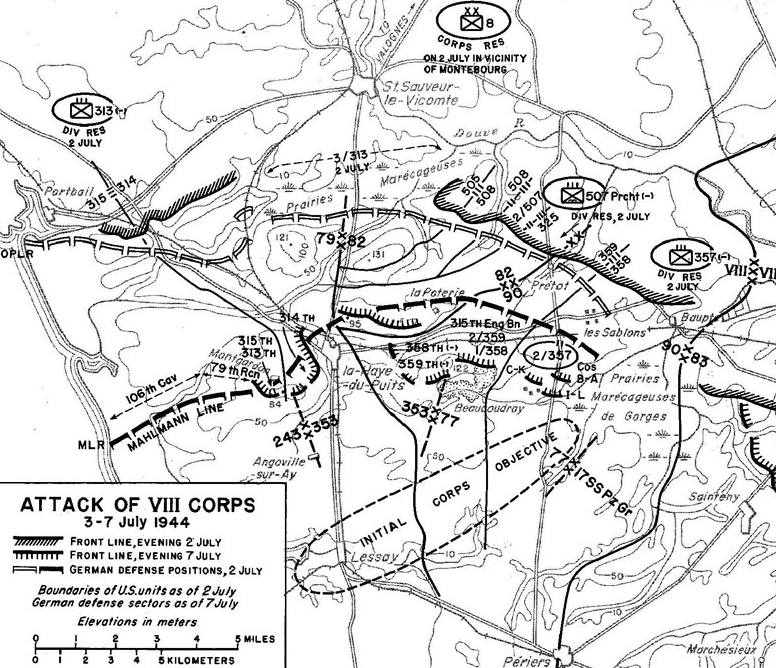
Attack of VIII Corps 3–7 July 1944

The 82nd Airborne Division commenced its attack even before their artillery had opened fire. A reinforced company of the 505th Parachute Infantry, aided by a French guide, slipped past the edge of the swamp and reached Hill 131 (Mont Étenclin), which was held by Osttruppen. Taken by surprise, they evacuated the position. The main body of the 505th Parachute Infantry reached the northern and eastern slopes of Hill 131 by mid-morning, and the slopes were captured for the loss of 4 paratroopers dead, 25 wounded and 5 missing; 146 prisoners were taken. The 508th Parachute Infantry had similar success securing the southern slopes of Hill 131.

The 325th Glider Infantry, advancing towards La Poterie ridge, found the going far more difficult. The advance was initially delayed by German land mines. Once they were negotiated, it moved rapidly for about 1 mile (1.6 km), but then one of the supporting tanks was disabled by a mine and three others became bogged. The regiment came under enfilading artillery fire observed from Mont Castre and was halted 2 miles (3.2 km) short of the eastern slopes of La Poterie ridge. Realising that it must be part of the main German position, Ridgway ordered the 325th to attack the ridge from the east, while his other regiments attacked from the north. The 325th resumed the attack in the evening, but managed to only advance about 1.5 miles (2.4 km) before 22:00, when it halted for the night.

The advance resumed the next day, with the 325th and two battalions of the 508th attacking towards La Poterie ridge, but making little progress. The other battalion of the 508th gained a position from which it was able to assault Hill 95. An artillery bombardment was laid on the hill by the VIII Corps Artillery, and the two companies attacked from the flanks in a double envelopment maneuver while its third rifle company attacked the hill frontally. The crest of the hill was taken, but a German counterattack drove the paratroops off it again, and the battalion pulled back 800 yards (730 m) to regroup. In the meantime, the 505th Parachute Infantry had made contact with the 79th Infantry Division.

Ridgway elected to conduct a night attack on La Poterie ridge. The attack went well because the German defenders had withdrawn. The 325th occupied the eastern slopes of La Poterie ridge, a battalion of the 507th Parachute Infantry reached the crest of the ridge and one company established a defensive position on the southern slopes, and the battalion of the 508th that had been driven off Hill 95 marched back up it again. When dawn broke the company on the southern slopes found that it was in a German bivouac, and a confused fight developed. By afternoon, the 82nd Airborne Division had secured all its objectives, although there remained some small groups of German who had been bypassed. In its advance, the division had taken 772 prisoners, and captured or destroyed two 75 mm guns, two 88 mm anti-aircraft guns, and a 37 mm antitank gun. Its casualties were considerable: the 325th, with an establishment strength of 135 officers and 2,838 enlisted men, had entered the battle with 55 officers and 1,245 enlisted men, and left it with 41 officers and 956 enlisted men. Its strongest rifle company had 57 men, and one had only 12. The 82nd Airborne Division was to have been pinched out of the line, but by 7 July the 79th and 90th Infantry Divisions were still 3 miles (4.8 km) apart. On 11 July the 82nd Airborne Division moved to the beaches to return to the United Kingdom and was replaced by the 8th Infantry Division.

==== 79th Infantry Division ====
The 79th Infantry Division, with the attached 749th Tank Battalion, 813th Tank Destroyer Battalion and 463rd Anti-Aircraft Artillery Battalion, had the task of advancing to the Ay River. The division commenced its attack when the artillery bombardment lifted at 05:30 on 3 July, and soon found itself fighting through hedgerows under fire from German snipers, artillery and the occasional tank. Hill 121, the first objective of the 314th Infantry, was a bare mound, atop which stood a ruined house, a chapel and a water tower, which the Germans fortified with logs and sandbags. The 79th Infantry Division's plan of attack was for its 1st Battalion to advance directly at the hill while the 3rd Battalion manoeuvred around its flank.

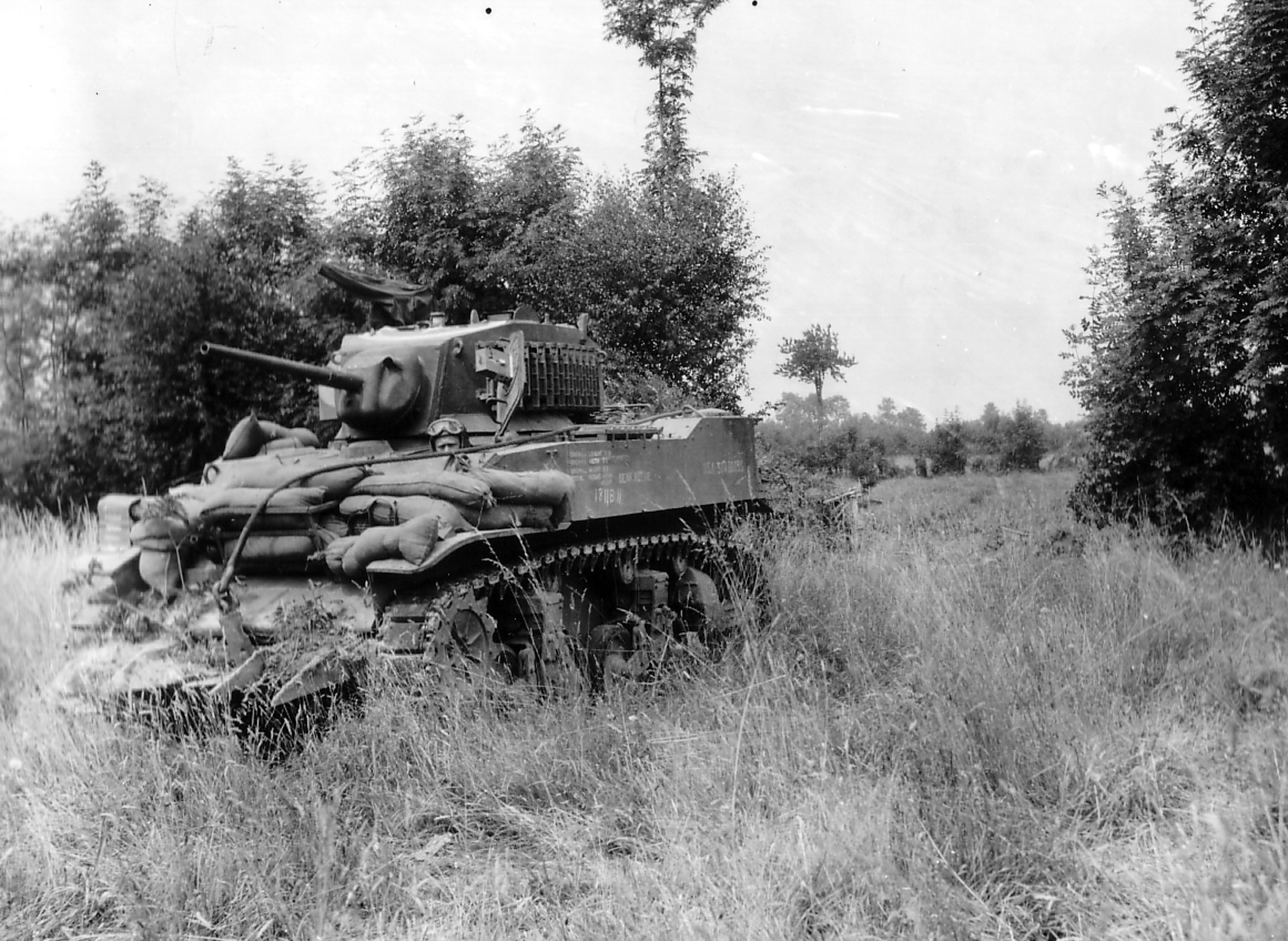
American M5 Stuart tank on 7 July 1944

After they had advanced for about 1/2 mile (0.8 km), they were held up by a German machine gun and mortars positioned behind a railway embankment. Private First Class William Thurston charged one machine gun post and eliminated the gunners with rifle fire. This allowed the rest of the battalion to overcome the position and continue the advance. Thurston was posthumously awarded the Distinguished Service Cross. The base of Hill 131 was reached around dusk. At around 03:30, an artillery liaison officer reported that the 3rd Battalion was on the hill, whereupon the regimental commander, Colonel Warren A. Robinson, ordered the 2nd Battalion to assist. Hill 121 was only held by outposts, and the two battalions reported it secured it by 08:30 on 4 July. Possession of the hill gave the 79th Infantry Division artillery good observation over Montgardon ridge and the town of La Haye-du-Puits. During the morning the regiment established contact with the 82nd Airborne Division and advance to within 2 miles (3.2 km) of the town, but were stopped by heavy German fire.

Meanwhile, the 315th Infantry had advanced through the hedgerows towards Montgardon ridge. Around noon three concealed German armored fighting vehicles that had been bypassed in the advance opened fire and the 749th Tank Battalion lost several tanks. The Germans were dealt with by artillery and anti-tank guns, but due to the consequent disorganisation and confusion, the advance was not resumed until the mid-afternoon. By the time Wyche called a halt for the night at 23:00 on 3 July, the regiment had advanced less than 2 miles (3.2 km), and was not even halfway to Montgardon ridge. The next day the 315th Infantry made good progress, allowing the divisional artillery to displace forward, but by evening it was still 2 miles (3.2 km) short of Montgardon ridge when the Germans mounted a surprise counterattack, and Companies B and C were temporarily surrounded. The regiment pulled back into a defensive position and called down artillery fire. The Germans withdrew after taking 64 Americans prisoner; the counterattack was to cover the withdrawal of the 243rd Infantry Division to the main defensive position on Montgardon ridge. Supported by artillery and tanks, the 315th Infantry, reached the slopes of Montgardon ridge on 5 July.

Wyche attempted to outflank the Germans on Montgardon ridge. On the morning of 5 July, the 3rd Battalion, 314th Infantry, entered the outskirts of La Haye-du-Puits and captured the railway station, but German artillery fire forced the regiment to pull out. A task force consisting of Company K of the 313th Infantry and Company A of the 749th Tank Battalion attempted to work around Montgardon ridge from the other flank, but the ground was swampy owing to the recent heavy rains. The task force came under heavy German artillery fire that halted it short of Montgardon. That evening the Germans mounted two counterattacks that forced it to withdraw.

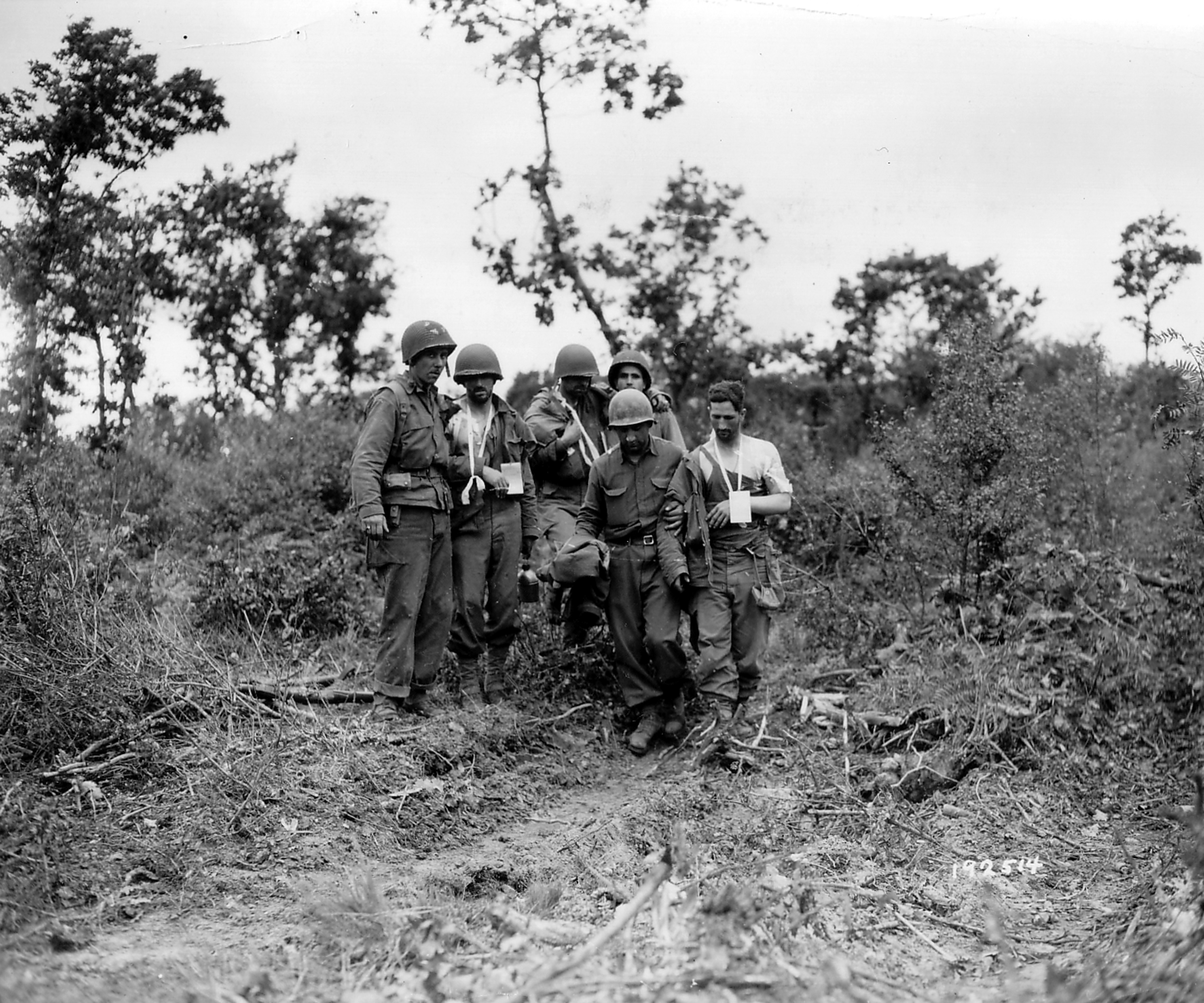
American wounded on Hill 84

The following day, Wyche ordered all three of his regiments to attack Montgardon ridge. Given the nature of the hedgerows, there seemed little point in trying to synchronize the attacks. In the west, the 313th Infantry encountered strong positions protected by barbed wire and land mines, and encountered fierce small arms, mortar and artillery fire that caused it to break off the attack. In the center, the 2nd Battalion, 315th Infantry, attacked at 17:00 and had captured most of Hill 84 (known as "Bloody Hill") by 21:00. In the process it had encountered troops from four regiments of the 243rd and 353rd Infantry Divisions, and elements of the 2nd SS Panzer Division. The 314th Infantry attacked from the east, and the 2nd Battalion reached the crest of Hill 84, but there was still a gap between it and the 315th Infantry that was exploited by German infiltrators during the night.

By daybreak on 7 July, with the 79th Infantry Division in control of the ridge line, the Americans expected that the Germans would withdraw from the slopes of Montgardon that they still held and the town of La Haye-du-Puits, but they did not. The 1st Battalion, 314th Infantry, attempted to occupy the town, but found it was still strongly held, and was forced back. That morning, after a 30-minute preparatory artillery bombardment, the 2nd Battalion, 313th Infantry, passed through the 315th Infantry and attempted to attack the southern slopes of Montgardon ridge. It advanced only 400 yards (370 m) before it was driven back by German artillery fire. A second attack by the 1st Battalion, 313th Infantry, that afternoon met the same fate. At 17:00, the Americans on Hill 84 were struck by a German counterattack by a panzergrenadier battalion of the 2nd SS Panzer Division supported by tanks. The counterattack nearly drove the 313th and 315th Infantry from Hill 84, but the Germans withdrew after losing three tanks. In the fighting that day, the 79th Infantry Division lost over 1,000 men killed, wounded or missing.

On 8 July, the 2nd Battalion, 314th Infantry, supported by tanks of the 749th Tank Battalion and the M10 tank destroyers of Company A, 813th Tank Destroyer Battalion, mounted an attack on La Haye-du-Puits. German small arms fire was heavy and accurate, and German tanks engaged the Americans. The Americans were forced to fight from house to house. Eventually the Germans withdrew to the railway yards, where they made a last stand. First Lieutenant Arch B. Hoge Jr. raised a Confederate flag that his uncle had carried in World War I and his grandfather had carried in the American Civil War over the town. The 2nd Battalion, 314th Infantry, was awarded a Presidential Unit Citation for the capture of the town.

==== 90th Infantry Division ====
The main attack on 3 July was made by the 90th Infantry Division, with the attached 712th Tank Battalion, 607th Tank Destroyer Battalion and 537th Anti-Aircraft Artillery Battalion, and a platoon of the 86th Chemical Mortar Battalion. Its attack had to be made through a narrow corridor a little over 1 mile (1.6 km) wide between the slopes of Mont Castre in the west and the swamplands of the Prairies Marécageuses de Gorges in the east. Mont Castre was a ridge about 3 miles (4.8 km) long. The western slopes near La Haye-du-Puits were bare; two stone houses stood on its northern slope; and the eastern slopes were the densely-wooded site of the Roman army camp that gave the ridge its name. Possession of the ridge was vital for any further advance to the south towards Périers, as the high ground provided observation over the entire area. Landrum's plan was for the 359th Infantry to capture Mont Castre while the 358th Infantry pushed south through the corridor. In support he had a battalion of the VIII Corps Artillery and the artillery of the 4th Infantry Division. He also massed the fire of the heavy weapons companies of his reserve regiment, the 357th Infantry, to support the advance.

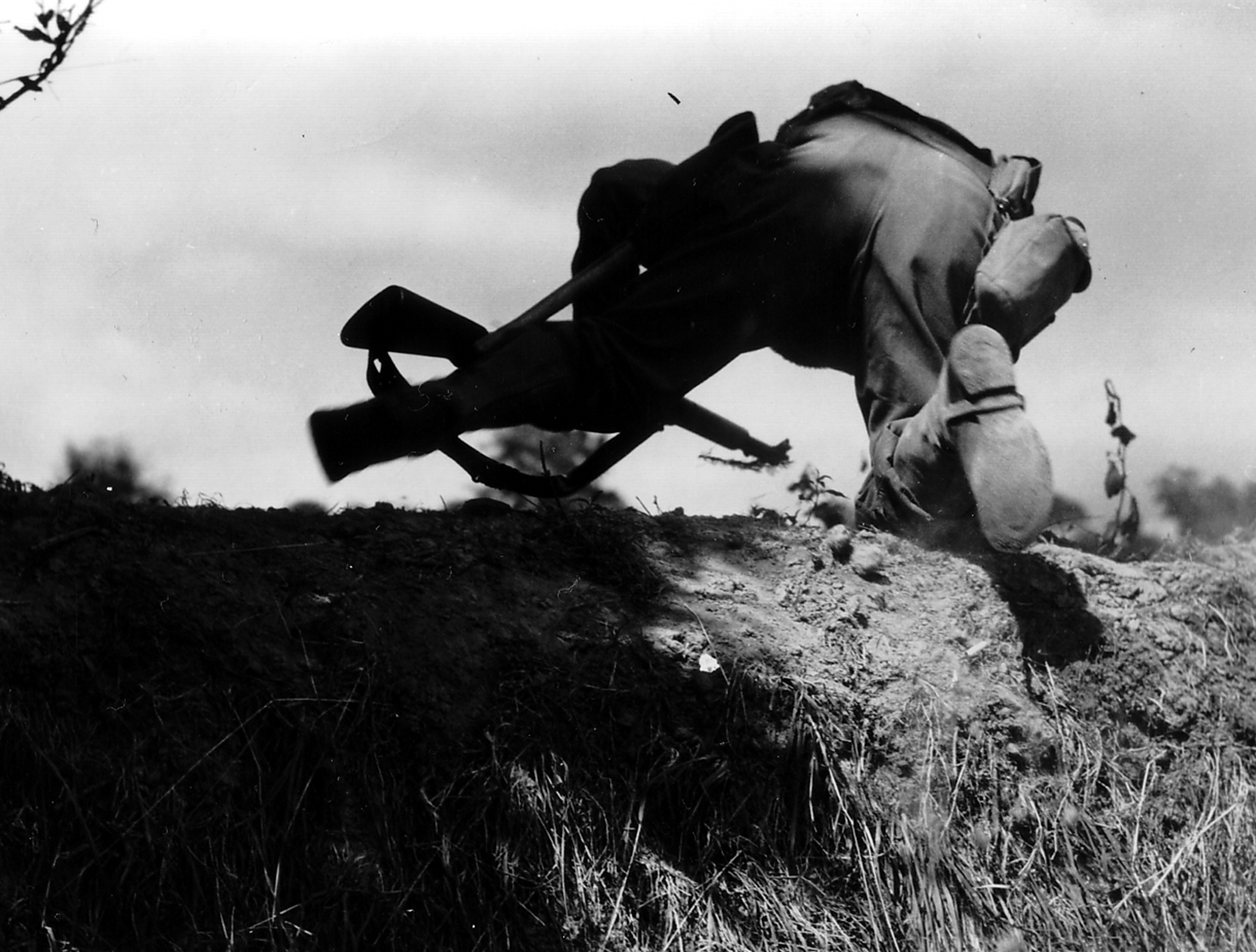
An American soldier crosses a hedgerow under fire on 7 July 1944

Despite the pouring rain, the attack made good progress in the first two hours. As the 2nd Battalion approached the hamlet of Les Sablons, which consisted of a half-dozen stone farm houses, they began taking small arms, mortar and artillery fire. At around 09:00, the 2nd Battalion's command post was hit by artillery and machine gun fire, and its commander, Lieutenant Colonel Merton Munson, was wounded. The regimental commander, Colonel Richard C. Partridge, called down white phosphorus and high explosive shells from the supporting artillery. Les Sablons was then captured around noon.

The Germans then counterattacked with three tanks, driving the battalion out of the hamlet, leaving a squad of engineers behind. Partridge brought up his 3rd Battalion to take over the advance, and called up light tanks, tank destroyers and his regimental anti-tank company. Partridge prepared for a night attack, but Landrum considered it to be unwise, and called it off. Colonel Clarke K. Fale's 359th Infantry met fierce resistance from the German garrison at Pretot. The hamlet was taken by the early afternoon, and the regiment had then advanced to the high ground around Sainte-Suzanne. This was captured by the evening. During the day, the 90th Infantry Division had advanced about 1,200 yards (1,100 m) at a cost of around 600 casualties.

The 90th Infantry Division resumed its attack the next day, starting with a ten-minute artillery barrage at 06:00. The Germans reacted with counter-battery fire so intense that it was feared that a counter-attack was in progress. None eventuated, but the colonels held up the start of their attack until Landrum ordered them to get moving. The 359th Infantry started 45 minutes late, and advanced several hundred yards towards Mont Castre before it was stopped by artillery, small arms and mortar fire. The Germans mounted a counter-attack with three armored fighting vehicles, and the 359th Infantry withdrew. In the afternoon though, the pace picked up and the regiment was able to advance almost 2 miles (3.2 km).

The 358th Infantry likewise encountered German artillery and mortar fire that the American field artillery seemed unable to suppress. While not particularly heavy, the German fire was very accurate, and casualties mounted. About 90 percent were from artillery and mortar fire; the rest came from small arms fire from German infiltrators. Partridge postponed his afternoon attack to 14:00, and then to 16:00; it finally got under way at 17:30. Captain Phillip H. Carroll led Company K forward, despite being wounded in one eye by a shell fragment, and it managed to advance several hundred yards, reaching its objective at around 18:15. He was awarded the Distinguished Service Cross.

The fighting on the second day was as fierce as that on the first. Company F reported that it had one officer and 65 enlisted men left. But the 90th Infantry Division had advanced another 2,000 yards (1,800 m) and gained part of the Foret de Mont Castre. The Germans had also taken heavy casualties; a prisoner from the 3rd Battalion, 894th Infantry Regiment, of the 265th Infantry Division, claimed that his battalion had taken so many it had been dissolved. Hausser was able to get OKW to release the 15th Parachute Regiment to his control, and it moved up during the night to seal off the American penetration. Through Ultra (intelligence obtained by decrypting German communications), the Americans had access to German casualty and status reports, and knew that while they were reporting defensive successes, they were also using up their reserves.

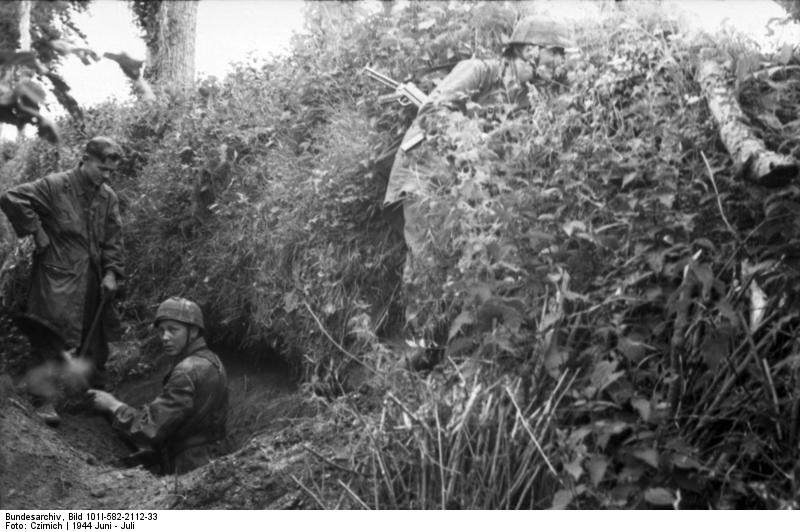
German paratroops in Normandy

Landrum now shifted the weight of his attack to the right, committing the 1st Battalion, 358th Infantry, to support the 359th Infantry, and replacing the rest of the 358th with the 357th Infantry. A break in the weather on 6 July permitted the use of close air support, although it started raining again that evening. The commander of the 359th Infantry, Colonel Clarke K. Fales, sent his 1st Battalion on a flanking maneuver, and it scaled the northern slopes of Mont Castre, while the other 2nd and 3rd battalions and the 1st Battalion, 358th Infantry, attacked the eastern slopes. Fearing encirclement, the Germans pulled back, leaving the Americans in control of Hill 122. However, there was still a gap between the 1st and 3rd Battalions, and resupply of food, water and ammunition and the evacuation of the wounded was difficult owing to the activity of bypassed and infiltrating Germans. One band attacked a platoon of the 86th Chemical Mortar Battalion, setting fire to a jeep and trailer and inflicting 17 casualties.

The advance on the left was continued by the 357th Infantry, under the command of Colonel George B. Barth. Aided by artillery and tanks, and shrouded by the morning mist and smoke shells fired by the artillery and chemical mortars, the 357th Infantry managed to capture the hamlet of Beaucoudray, and advance several hundred yards beyond. Around 22:15 that night, the Germans mounted a counter-attack from the flank against Companies C, I and L south of Beaucoudray. Company C fell back, and joined Company K in its position north of the hamlet, while Companies I and L became cut off. During the night the six companies north of Beaucoudray fought off a series of German attacks. By morning, their positions appeared secure, but there was no word from companies I and L south of Beaucoudray.

Barth sent Company B with tanks of Company B the 712th Tank Battalion to re-establish contact. This task force was hit by a German counter-attack at around 14:50 which, although repulsed, inflicted heavy casualties on Company B, including all its officers and non-commissioned officers. The task force then fell back. Meanwhile, the companies north of Beaucoudray beat off 15 counter-attacks. A party sent from the encircled battalions to fetch ammunition reached the 3rd Battalion's lines by moving through the swamp, but it was deemed too dangerous to permit them to return. A runner also reached the 3rd Battalion command post to report that the Company I command post had been overrun by German tanks, and that the remnants were short of ammunition. Barth ordered Company E to proceed to their relief, but German artillery fire delayed the attack, which had to be postponed until dawn on 8 July. By this time sounds of fighting to the south had ceased. Six men who had made their way through the swamp reported that most of the companies' officers and men had been killed or captured, and Barth called off the attack.

On 7 July, Partridge was showing three newly-arrived replacement captains around the regimental lines when an artillery round exploded nearby, killing two of the captains and wounding Partridge and the other captain. That day, Landrum replaced Fales, whom he judged to be exhausted, replacing him with his chief of staff, Colonel Robert Bacon. In five days of combat against German forces of roughly equal strength, the 90th Infantry Division had advanced 4 miles (6.4 km) at a cost of over 2,000 casualties.

=== 8–14 July ===
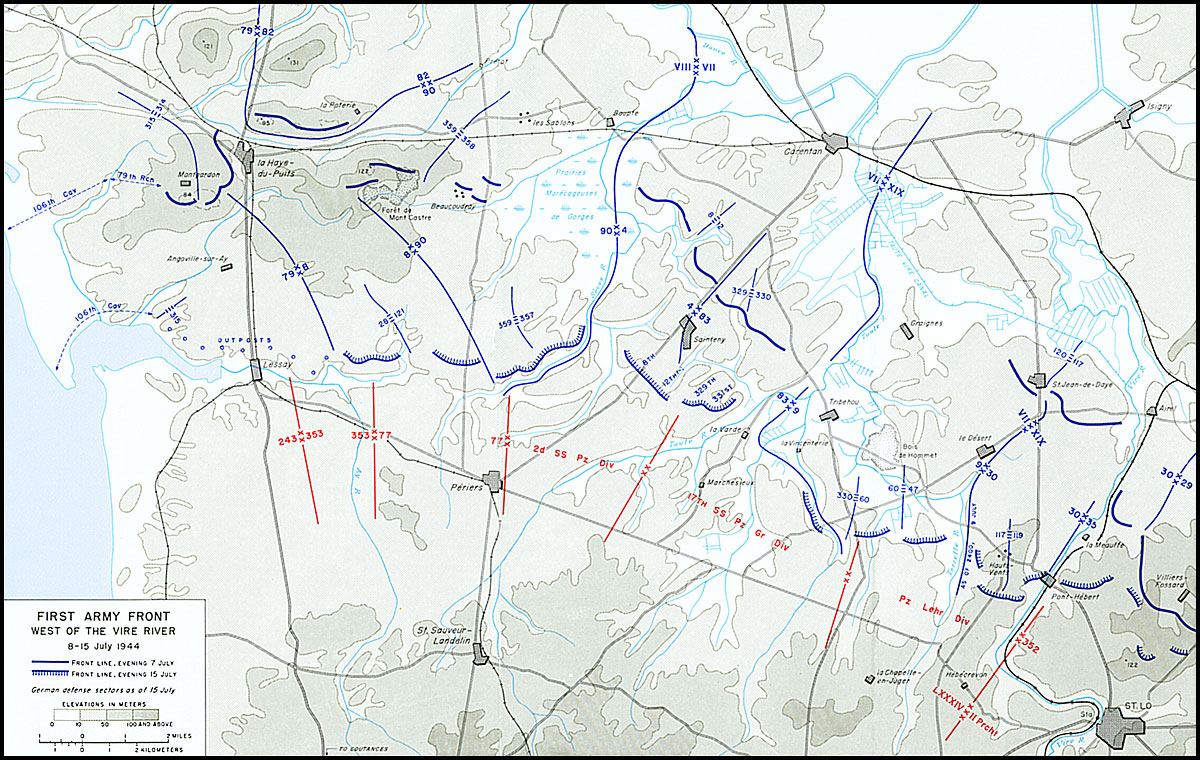
Positions of US and German divisions on 8 July from the Vire river west to the sea

==== 8th Infantry Division ====
Middleton intended for the fresh 8th Infantry Division to relieve the 90th Infantry Division in the Foret de Mont Castre, leaving the 90th Infantry Division with the 357th Infantry's sector. The 90th Infantry Division would continue the advance to link up with the 79th Infantry Division. The 8th Infantry Division was commanded by Major General William C. McMahon, and was considered one of the best-trained divisions in the US Army. On entering combat though, it exhibited all the now-familiar problems of a new division, such as hesitation, disorganization, misreporting of map locations, large numbers of stragglers, poor employment of its attached supporting units, and no idea how to deal with the tactical problems imposed by the bocage.

American intelligence indicated that the Germans intended a counter-attack with the 2nd SS Panzer Division. To counter this, the planned sectors were adjusted slightly, with the 8th Infantry deployed further west so it could disrupt the German attack. It had difficulty moving into the front line, so the planned disruptive attack did not take place. The German counter-attack was repulsed, but the 8th Infantry was still unable to advance. McMahon relieved two of his regimental commanders. On 10 July, the assistant division commander, Brigadier General Nelson M. Walker, was killed while trying to organize an attack by an infantry battalion. He was posthumously awarded the Distinguished Service Cross.

The 8th Infantry Division struggled to get organized. The deputy First Army commander, Lieutenant General Courtney H. Hodges, visited the division and reported that it "had made no known progress, for reasons not very clear." Middleton relieved McMahon on 12 July, and replaced him with Brigadier General Donald A. Stroh, the deputy commander of the 9th Infantry Division. Walker was succeeded by Colonel Charles D. W. Canham, who had commanded the 116th Infantry on Omaha Beach on D-Day. The division gradually gained confidence and proficiency in attacking the hedgerows, and managed to capture the ridge overlooking the Ay River on 14 July.

==== 79th Infantry Division ====
The 79th Infantry Division resumed its advance at noon on 9 July, with the 315th Infantry attacking the southern slopes of Hill 84. The average infantry company in the division had one officer and 94 enlisted men on 7 July; by 9 July it was down to 47 enlisted men. Slow but steady progress was made, and the 1st and 3rd Battalions were on the objective by 13:00. A counter-attack was repulsed that evening. The following day, contact was made with the 315th Infantry, and the 313th Infantry attacked the hamlet of Le Bot three times before the Germans finally withdrew. An American airstrike accidentally provided close air support when bombs were dropped 400 yards (370 m) short of the safety line. This permitted the 313th Infantry to capture its objective, the Hierville-Angoville-sur-Ay area. On 14 July, the division reached its objective, the Ay River. The Germans had already withdrawn across it, but continued to conduct raids on the American positions. In eleven days of fighting, the 79th Infantry Division had taken 2,930 casualties.

==== 90th Infantry Division ====
On 10 July, the 358th Infantry attacked the German positions on the southern slopes of Mont Castre. The lead elements crossed the line of departure around 14:00. Companies I and L advanced abreast, each with two platoons forward as scouts, with the weapons platoon and third platoon following. Visibility in the thick undergrowth was poor; in places only 5 to 25 yards (4.6 to 22.9 m). Ten hand grenades were thrown at the Company I light machine gun section, which took heavy casualties. The company commander seized one of the machine guns and attempted to advance but was met with fire from machine guns on a rocky knoll that pinned the whole company down. A rifleman crawled forward and attacked the knoll with his rifle, but was wounded. Another then crawled forward and threw some hand grenades in the German position. A German prisoner was taken, who called out to the men at the knoll to surrender. Eight, three of whom were wounded, did so; nine dead Germans were found. The rocky knoll gave the 358th Infantry observation over the southern slopes, and the hedgerow fields beyond the forest.

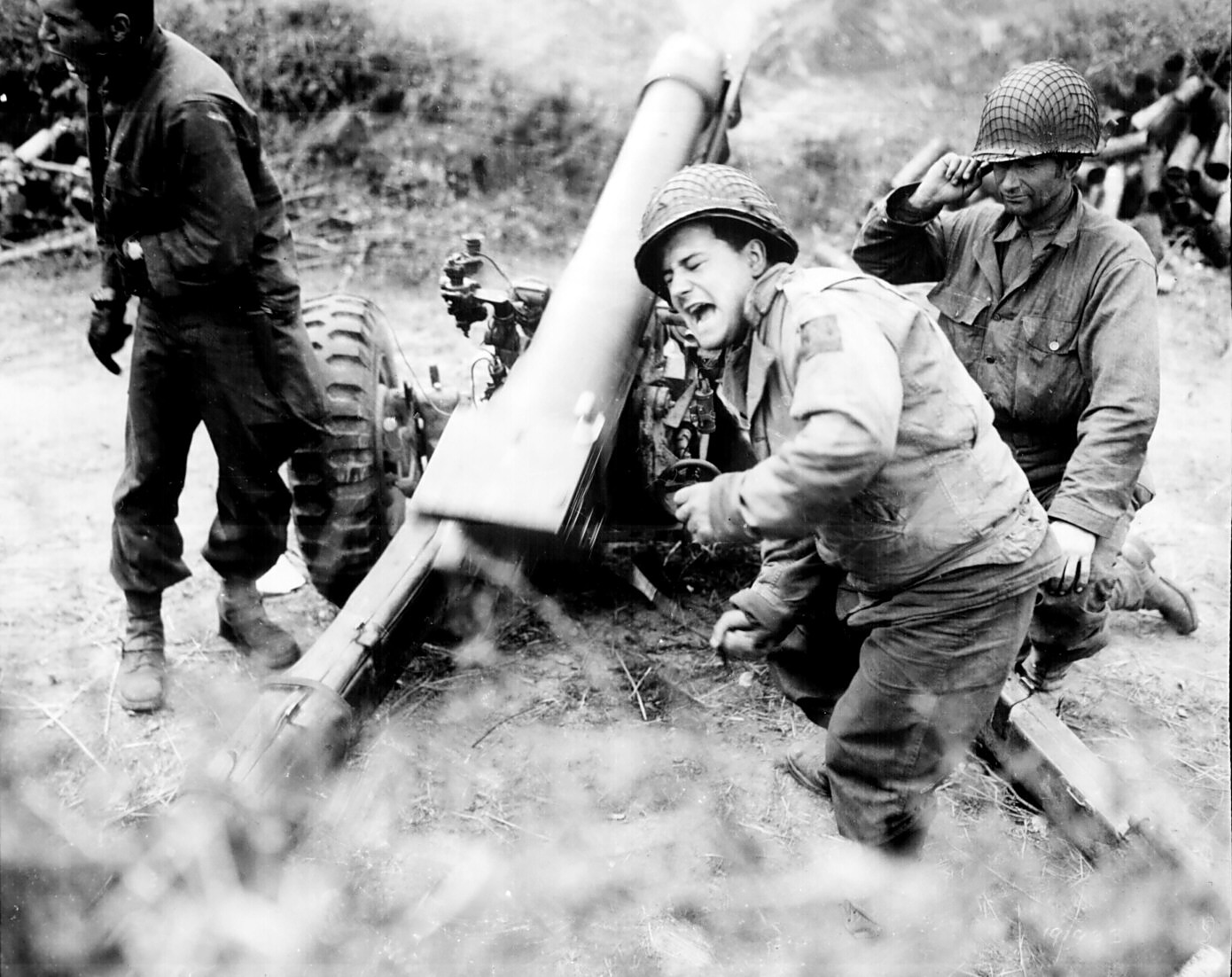
An American 105 mm howitzer shells German positions on 11 July

The commander of Company L was wounded when he attacked and destroyed a German machine gun that was holding up the company. A German squad worked its way around Company L's position, and attacked the 3rd Battalion headquarters, inflicting 15 casualties before they were repulsed with the help of a platoon of Company L. The battalion commander then ordered Company K and the attached platoon from the 712th Tank Battalion to advance from the south edge of the Foret de Mont Castre into the open fields beyond. As they emerged into the open, two tanks were knocked out by a German self-propelled gun located in an orchard to the south, and the third tank became bogged down and immobilized. Company K was pinned down by machine gun fire, and both the company commander and the executive officer were wounded. Company K withdrew under cover of darkness.

At dusk, Company I had 2 officers and 64 enlisted men; Company K had one officer and 31 enlisted men; and Company L had one officer and 48 enlisted men. The Company K executive officer was found the next day; he had been treated by German medics, who had carted off other wounded members of the company. The battalion commander was evacuated, and the battalion S-3 assumed control of what was now a company. The attack was resumed at 20:00, and the unit destroyed eleven German machine gun nests. It reached a position 400 yards (370 m) north of Lastelle, but withdrew to make contact with the 1st Battalion, 359th Infantry. Together they advanced to the outskirts of Lastelle. On 12 July, the Germans were found to have withdrawn.

The German LXXXIV Corps reported casualties of 578 killed, wounded and missing across its front on 10 July. Choltitz, who had suffered a concussion, reported that he could no longer hold the front without reinforcements. Since Kluge had none to give, he authorized a withdrawal to the Ay and Sèves Rivers. The 90th Infantry Division reached its final objective, the Sèves River, on 14 July. The advance from Mont Castre to the Sèves had cost it almost 2,000 casualties.

== Aftermath ==
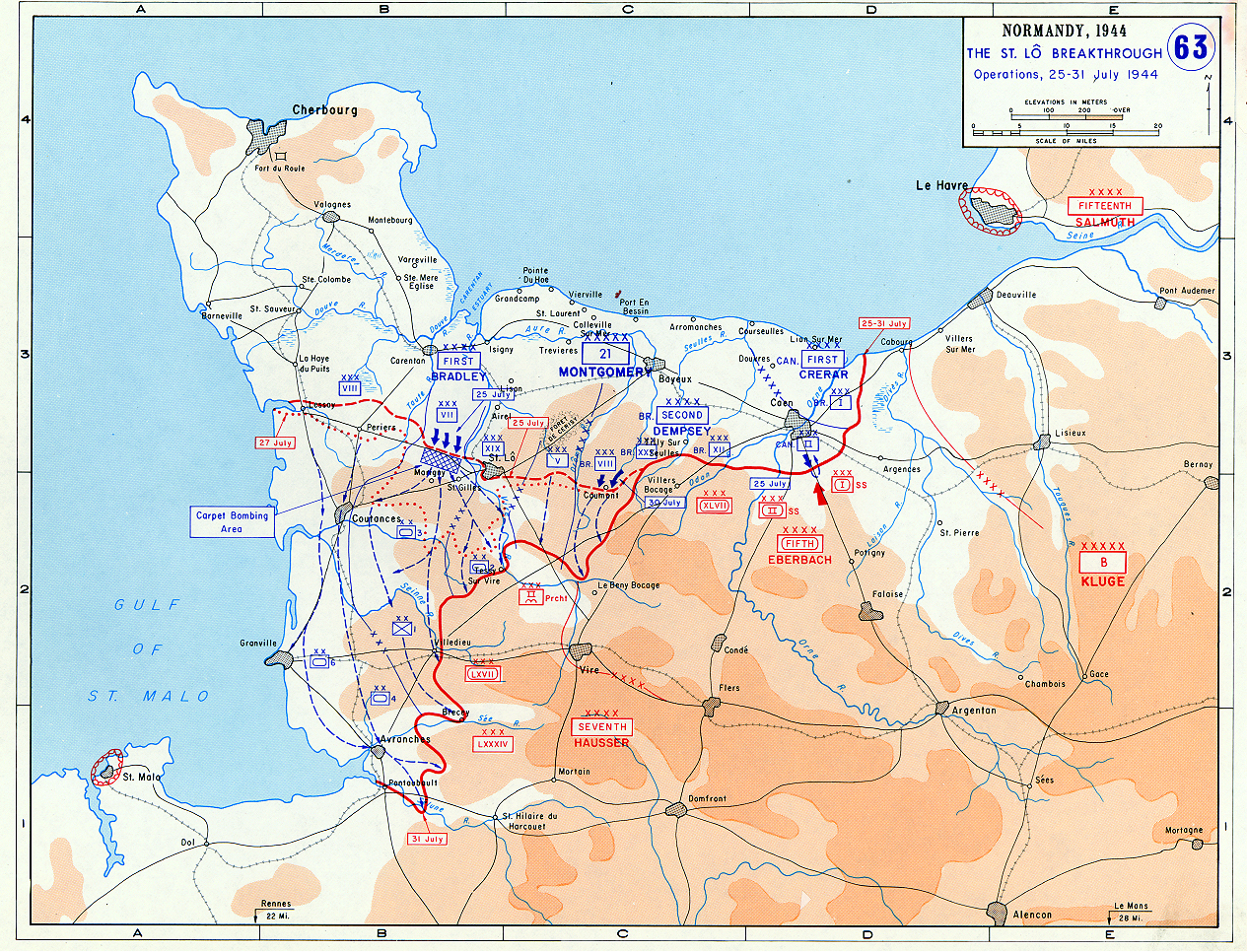
The St. Lô breakthrough, 25–31 July

At a cost of over 10,000 casualties, VIII Corps had advanced 7 miles (11 km) to the Ay and Sèves rivers; its original objective, Coutances, was another 14 miles (23 km) away, and the Germans had withdrawn in good order. About 90 percent of the American casualties were infantrymen; those among officers were particularly high. Most wounds were the result of shell fragments. Many casualties resulted from soldiers failing to remember what they had been taught in basic training. In addition to physical casualties were psychological casualties from combat fatigue, which were not always counted in casualty reports. The First Army established two combat fatigue centers to deal with these cases, who were normally returned to their units after 24 to 72 hours of rest.

German casualties are hard to determine, because divisions were committed to the fighting piecemeal and scattered across the Allied front, and casualties could not be attributed to particular areas. A key difference between the Americans and Germans was the availability of replacements for casualties. The 243rd Infantry Division reported 8,000 casualties in Normandy, but by 11 July all of Army Group B had received just 5,210 replacements, representing about 12 percent of its casualties. Kluge reported to OKW that the defense in Normandy might not hold because he could not afford the casualties.

Eisenhower considered that the key factors in the fighting were the quality of the German soldier, the rugged terrain, and the inclement weather, in that order. There was more rain in June and July 1944 than in any year since 1900, and the conditions meant that half of all planned air support missions could not be flown. Greater use was made of artillery, but observation was hampered by the weather, so wider concentrations were fired than usual, and ammunition stocks because depleted, resulting in rationing of key calibers like 105 mm howitzer.

On 11 July, the First Army began the second part of its offensive, an attack on Saint-Lô, but by 21 July, this too had stalled short of its objective, the Coutances-Saint-Lô line, so Bradley prepared for another attempt. On 25 July, Operation Cobra commenced with a concentrated aerial bombardment from hundreds of Allied aircraft. Supporting offensives had drawn the bulk of German armored reserves toward the British and Canadian sector and, coupled with the general lack of men and materiel available to the Germans, it was impossible for them to form successive lines of defense. Units of the VII Corps led the initial two-division assault, while other First Army units mounted supporting attacks designed to pin German units in place. Progress was slow on the first day but opposition started to crumble once the defensive crust had been broken,. and by 31 July, the First Army was finally free of the bocage.

By 24 August, the left bank of the Seine had been cleared, and Operation Overlord was completed. In just 30 days, the Allied forces had conducted an advance that had been expected to take 70. Reaching the D plus 90 line on D plus 79 was not a grave concern, as the Overlord plan had sufficient flexibility to allow for a discrepancy of eleven days. The plan called for a pause on the Seine of at least 30 days, but the decision was taken to continue the pursuit of the retreating German forces beyond the Seine. Between 25 August and 12 September, the Allied armies advanced from the D plus 90 phase line to the D plus 350 one, moving through 260 phase lines in just 19 days.
