= Lessay Abbey =

- Abbey of the Holy Trinity of Lessay
- French: Abbaye Sainte-Trinité de Lessay
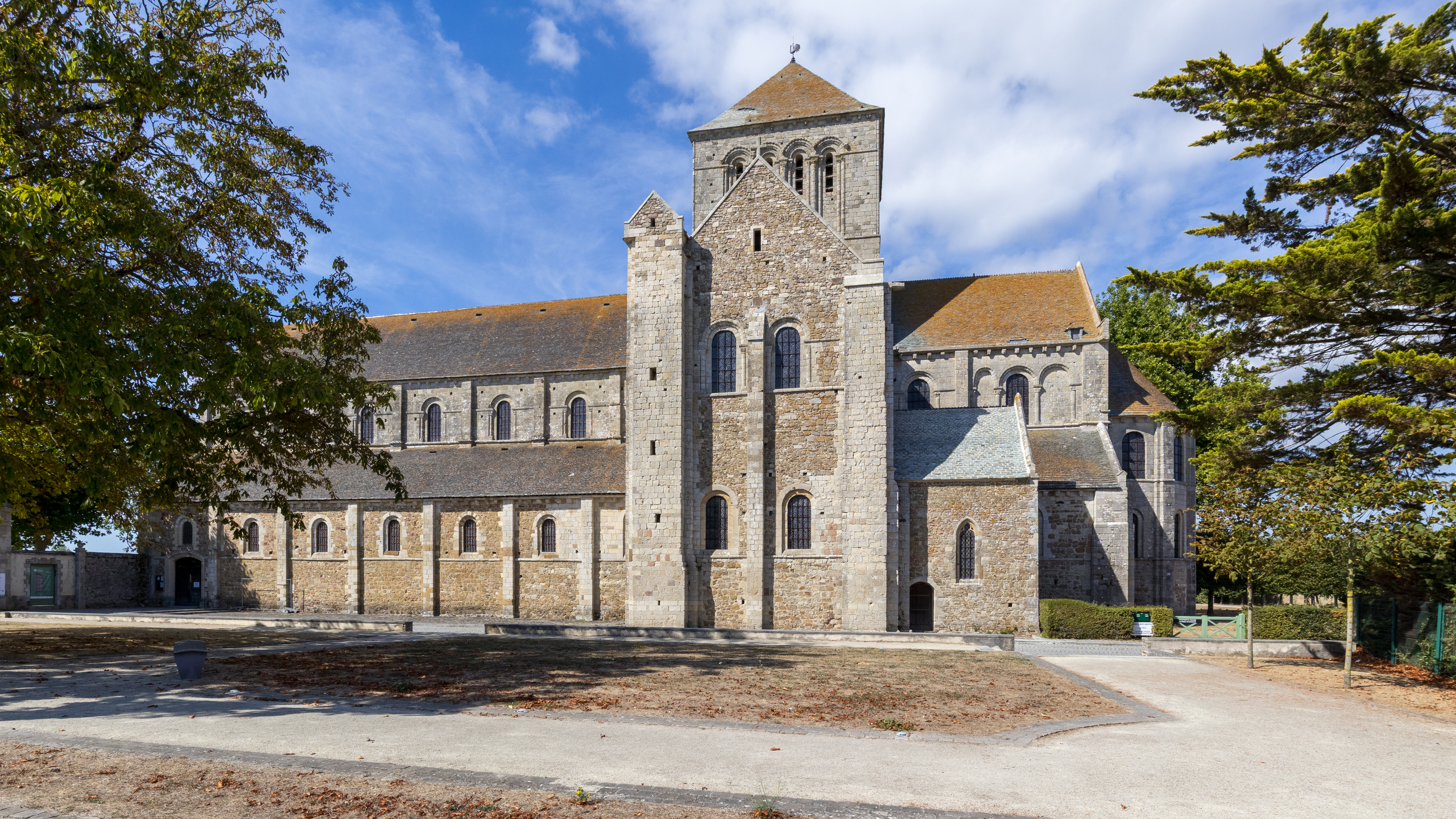
- Lessay Abbey

- Location within France
- 49°13′12″N 1°31′58″W
- Location: Lessay, Manche, Normandy
- Country: France
- Denomination: Roman Catholic
- Religious order: Benedictines
- Website: www.abbayes-normandes.com/abbaye/abbaye-de-la-sainte-trinite-de-lessay/

Administration
- Diocese: Coutances
- Parish: Sainte-Opportune

Monument historique
- Official name: Ancienne abbaye de Lessay
- Type: Abbaye
- Designated: 1840; October 19, 1946
- Reference no.: PA00110438

The Abbey of the Holy Trinity (French: Abbaye de la Sainte-Trinité) is an 11th century Romanesque Benedictine Abbey church located in Lessay, Manche, France, then in Normandy. The abbey is one of the most important Norman Romanesque churches, and, along with Durham Cathedral, one of the first examples use of the rib vault to cover the choir in about 1098. This element became a key feature of Gothic architecture. The abbey was nearly destroyed in 1357. It was destroyed in 1944 and subsequently rebuilt.

== History ==
The Benedictine Abbey of the Holy Trinity in Lessay was founded in 1056 by Turstin Haldup, Baron of La Haye-du-Puits, and his wife Emma, who deeded all their holdings in the Sainte-Opportune parish to the new monastery. This charter was confirmed in 1080 by Eudes au Capel, Turstin's son and William the Conqueror's seneschal. Duke William and Geoffrey de Montbray, bishop of Coutances, signed the abbey's charter, as did the bishops of Canterbury, York, Bayeux, Winchester, and St. Anselm. Eudes au Capel was buried in Lessay Abbey's choir in 1098.

When Eudes Rigaud, Archbishop of Rouen, visited Lessay in 1250, the abbey had 36 monks, had 1,400 livres in its treasury and owed 450 to its creditors. When Riguad visited again in 1266, there were 56 monks, but hostilities with the Kingdom of England had caused the monastery significant privations.

In 1337, Lessay's abbot had a parish church independent of the abbey built for Sainte-Opportune parish. The monastery bestowed the townships of Anneville-en-Saire and Bolleville with a trade fair in 1423.
