= Baudreville =

Baudreville is the name of several communes in France:

- Baudreville, Eure-et-Loir, in the Eure-et-Loir département
- Baudreville, Manche, in the Manche département
