= Glatigny =

Glatigny may refer to the following places in France:

- Glatigny, Loir-et-Cher, a former parish of Souday, Loir-et-Cher department
- Glatigny, Manche, in the Manche department
- Glatigny, Moselle, in the Moselle department
- Glatigny, Oise, in the Oise department
- Clagny-Glatigny, a quarter of Versailles, in the Yvelines department

Glatigny is also the name of several castles and manors in France:

- château de Glatigny, in Souday, in the Loir-et-Cher department
- manoir de Glatigny, in Savigny-sur-Braye, in the Loir-et-Cher department
- manoir de Glatigny, in Tourgéville, in the Calvados department
- château de Glatigny, in Glatigny in the Manche department
- château de Glatigny, in Cuissai, in the Orne department
