= Lessay =

- Commune
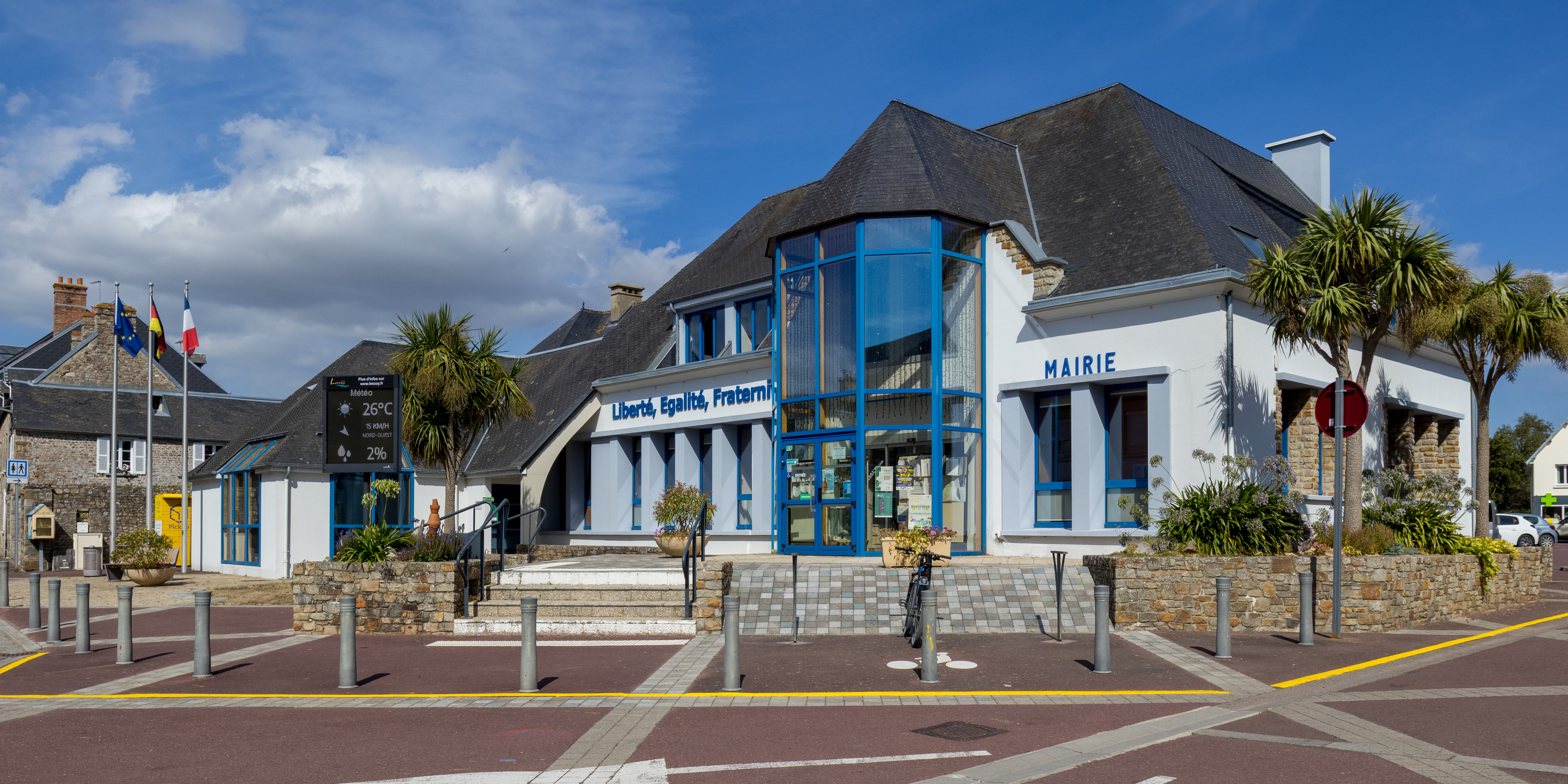
- Town hall
- Location of Lessay
- Location within France Location within Normandy
- Coordinates: 49°13′05″N 1°31′46″W
- Country: France
- Region: Normandy
- Department: Manche
- Arrondissement: Coutances
- Canton: Créances

Government
  - Mayor (2020–2026): Stéphanie Maubé
- Area^{1}: 28.95 km^{2} (11.18 sq mi)
- Elevation: 10 m (33 ft)
- Highest elevation: 42 m (138 ft)
- Lowest elevation: 5 m (16 ft)
- Population (2023): 2,278
  - Density: 78.69/km^{2} (203.8/sq mi)
- Time zone: UTC+01:00 (CET)
  - Summer (DST): UTC+02:00 (CEST)
- INSEE/Postal code: 50267 /50430
- ^{1} French Land Register data, which excludes lakes, ponds, glaciers > 1 km^{2} (0.386 sq mi or 247 acres) and river estuaries.

Lessay (French pronunciation: [lɛsɛ]) is a commune in the Manche department in north-western France. On 1 January 2016, the former commune of Angoville-sur-Ay was merged into Lessay.

== Geography ==
Lessay is a small town in the centre of the Cotentin Peninsula, Normandy.

== History ==
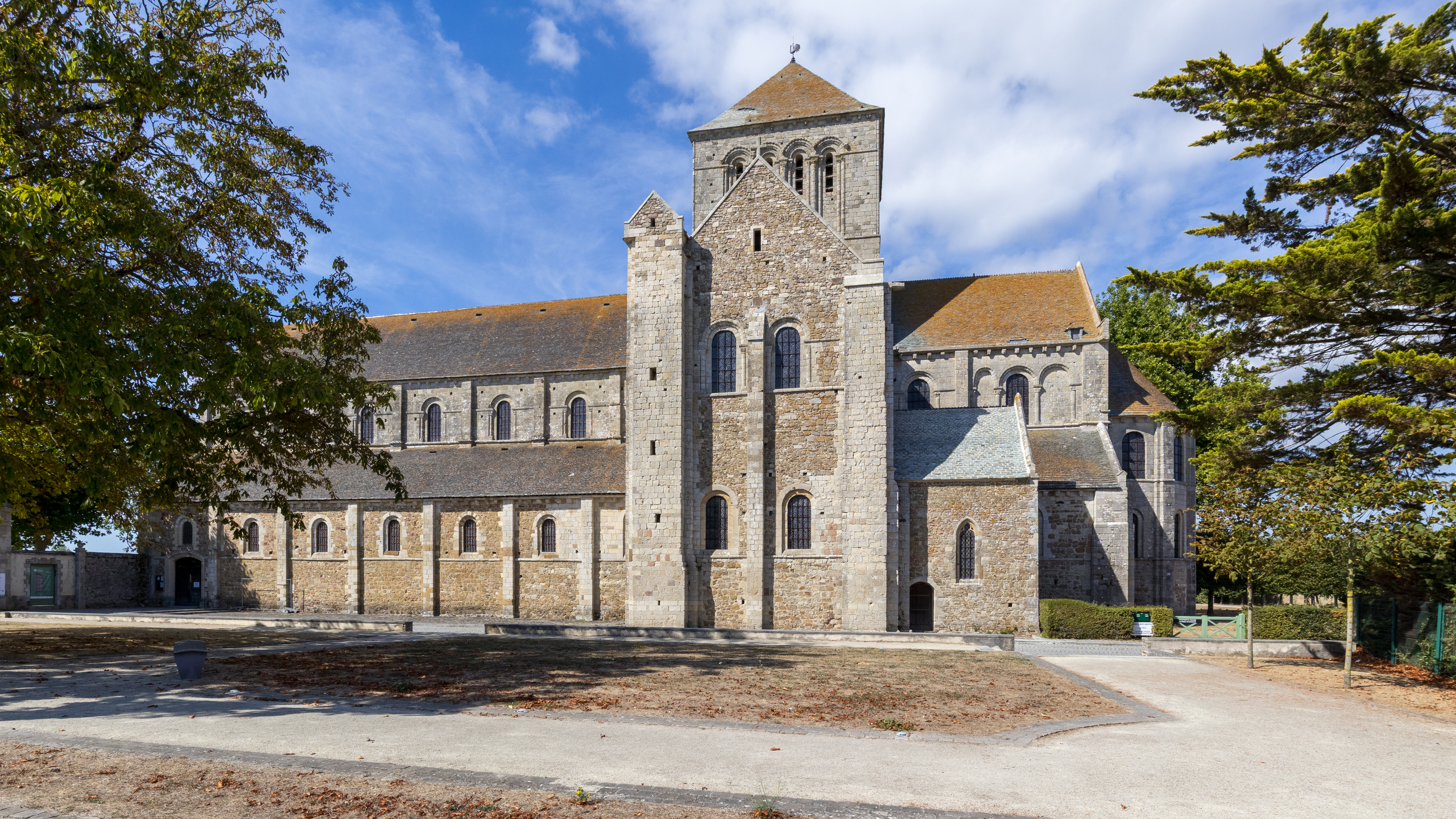
Holy Trinity Abbey

It was founded as a monastery but a town grew up around it over the years. The 10th-century Lessay Abbey is one of the greatest examples of Romanesque architecture in Normandy. It was largely destroyed by fighting in the town during July–August 1944, but has been rebuilt.

== Population ==
Population data refer to the area corresponding with the commune as of January 2025.

Historical population
Year	Pop.	±% p.a.
1968	1,597	—
1975	1,540	−0.52%
1982	1,561	+0.19%
1990	1,921	+2.63%
1999	1,993	+0.41%
2007	2,287	+1.73%
2012	2,259	−0.25%
2017	2,245	−0.12%
2023	2,278	+0.24%
Source: INSEE

== Heraldry ==
Arms of Lessay	The arms of Lessay are blazoned : Sable, a woodsman's axe palewise Or, blade to sinister.

== Points of interest ==
- LORAN-C transmitter Lessay
- La Foire: the Sainte Croix fair of Lessay is a trade fair established in the 11th century in order to develop commercial activity in the village. For three days in the second week of September, 42 acres (170,000 m^{2}) of Lessay is transformed into a marketplace, attracting over 400,000 visitors. The fair offers demonstrations of old and new trades, thousands of stalls selling a range of products from household equipment to animals, food, cars and garden and agricultural tools.
- Lessay was the location for the studio for English language commercial radio station Contact 94 which was aimed at the Channel Islands before they had commercial radio of their own. The station launched on 5 September 1988 and closed in 1991.

== See also ==
- Communes of the Manche department
