= Mobecq =

- Part of La Haye
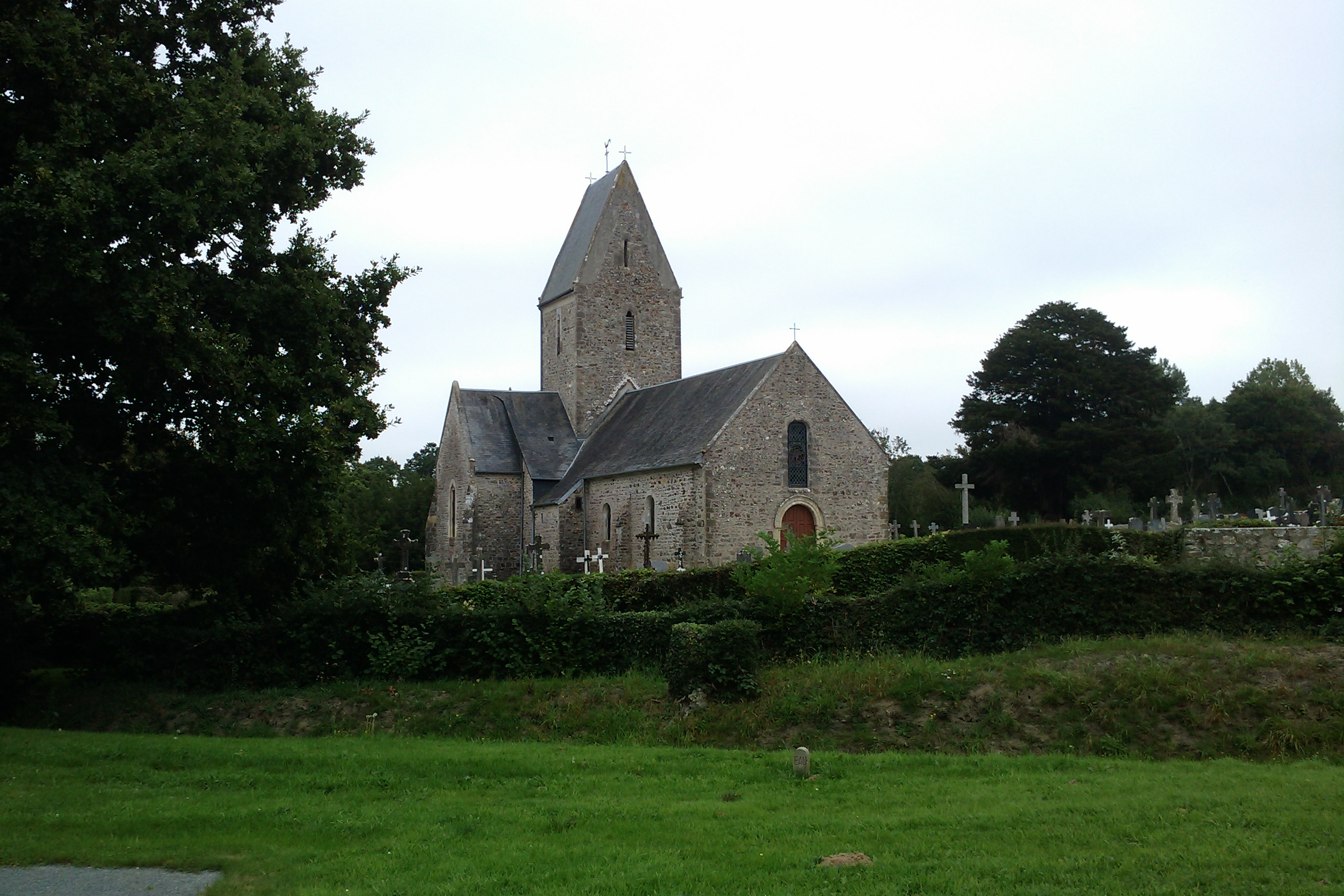
- Location of Mobecq
- Location within France Location within Normandy
- Coordinates: 49°16′23″N 1°31′00″W
- Country: France
- Region: Normandy
- Department: Manche
- Arrondissement: Coutances
- Canton: Créances
- Commune: La Haye
- Area^{1}: 7.99 km^{2} (3.08 sq mi)
- Elevation: 51 m (167 ft)
- Highest elevation: 110 m (360 ft)
- Lowest elevation: 32 m (105 ft)
- Population (2022): 235
  - Density: 29.4/km^{2} (76.2/sq mi)
- Time zone: UTC+01:00 (CET)
  - Summer (DST): UTC+02:00 (CEST)
- Postal code: 50250
- ^{1} French Land Register data, which excludes lakes, ponds, glaciers > 1 km^{2} (0.386 sq mi or 247 acres) and river estuaries.

Mobecq (French pronunciation: [mɔbɛk]) is a former commune in the Manche department in Normandy in north-western France. On 1 January 2016, it was merged into the new commune of La Haye. Its population was 235 in 2022.

== See also ==
- Communes of the Manche department
