= Saint-Symphorien-le-Valois =

- Part of La Haye
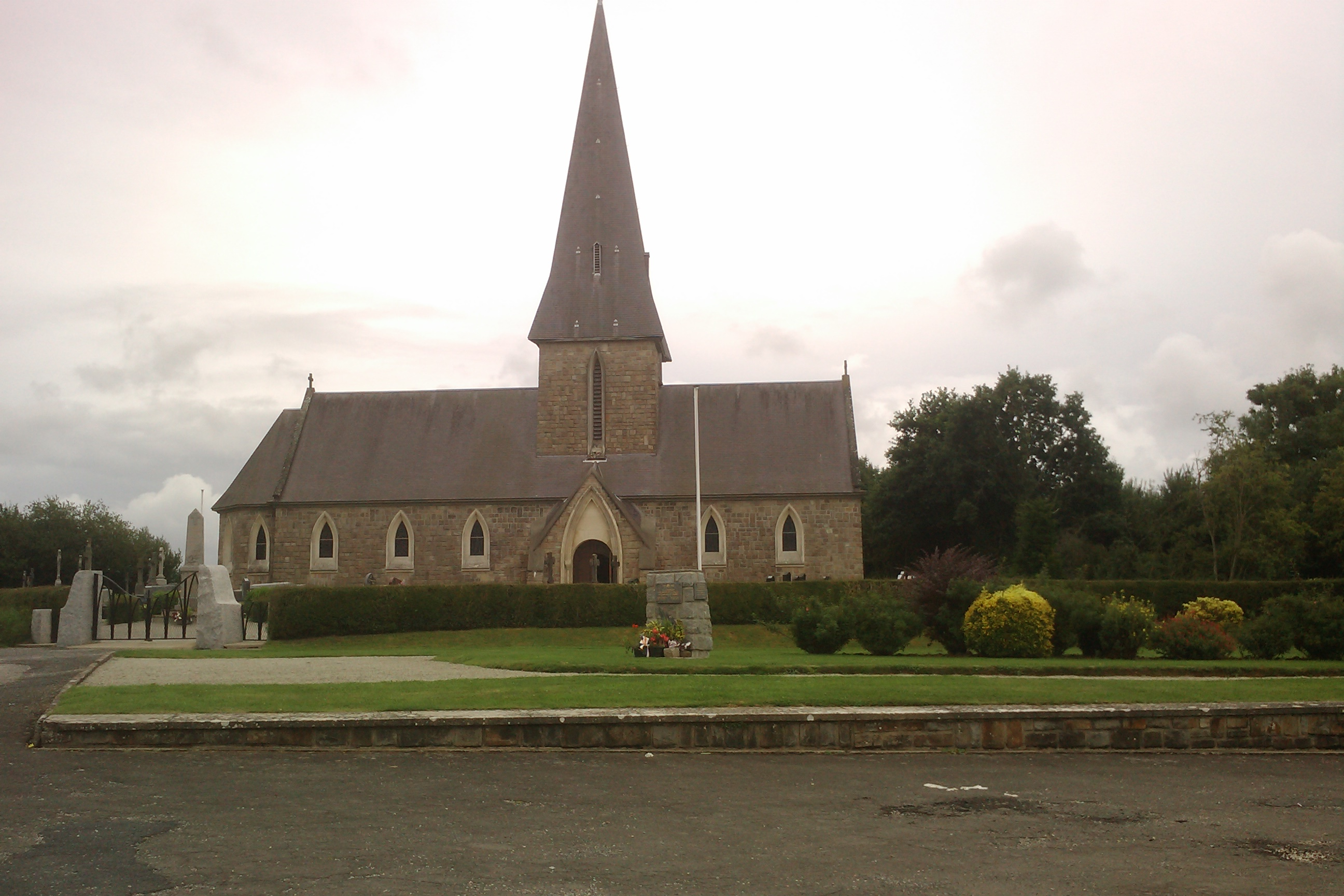
- The church of the village
- Location of Saint-Symphorien-le-Valois
- Location within France Location within Normandy
- Coordinates: 49°17′46″N 1°33′09″W
- Country: France
- Region: Normandy
- Department: Manche
- Arrondissement: Coutances
- Canton: Créances
- Commune: La Haye
- Area^{1}: 5.8 km^{2} (2.2 sq mi)
- Elevation: 38 m (125 ft)
- Highest elevation: 81 m (266 ft)
- Lowest elevation: 23 m (75 ft)
- Population (2022): 813
  - Density: 140/km^{2} (360/sq mi)
- Time zone: UTC+01:00 (CET)
  - Summer (DST): UTC+02:00 (CEST)
- Postal code: 50250
- ^{1} French Land Register data, which excludes lakes, ponds, glaciers > 1 km^{2} (0.386 sq mi or 247 acres) and river estuaries.

Saint-Symphorien-le-Valois (French pronunciation: [sɛ̃ sɛ̃fɔʁjɛ̃ lə valwa]) is a former commune in the Manche department in Normandy in north-western France. On 1 January 2016, it was merged into the new commune of La Haye. Its population was 813 in 2022.

== See also ==
- Communes of the Manche department
