= La Haye, Manche =

La Haye
- Commune
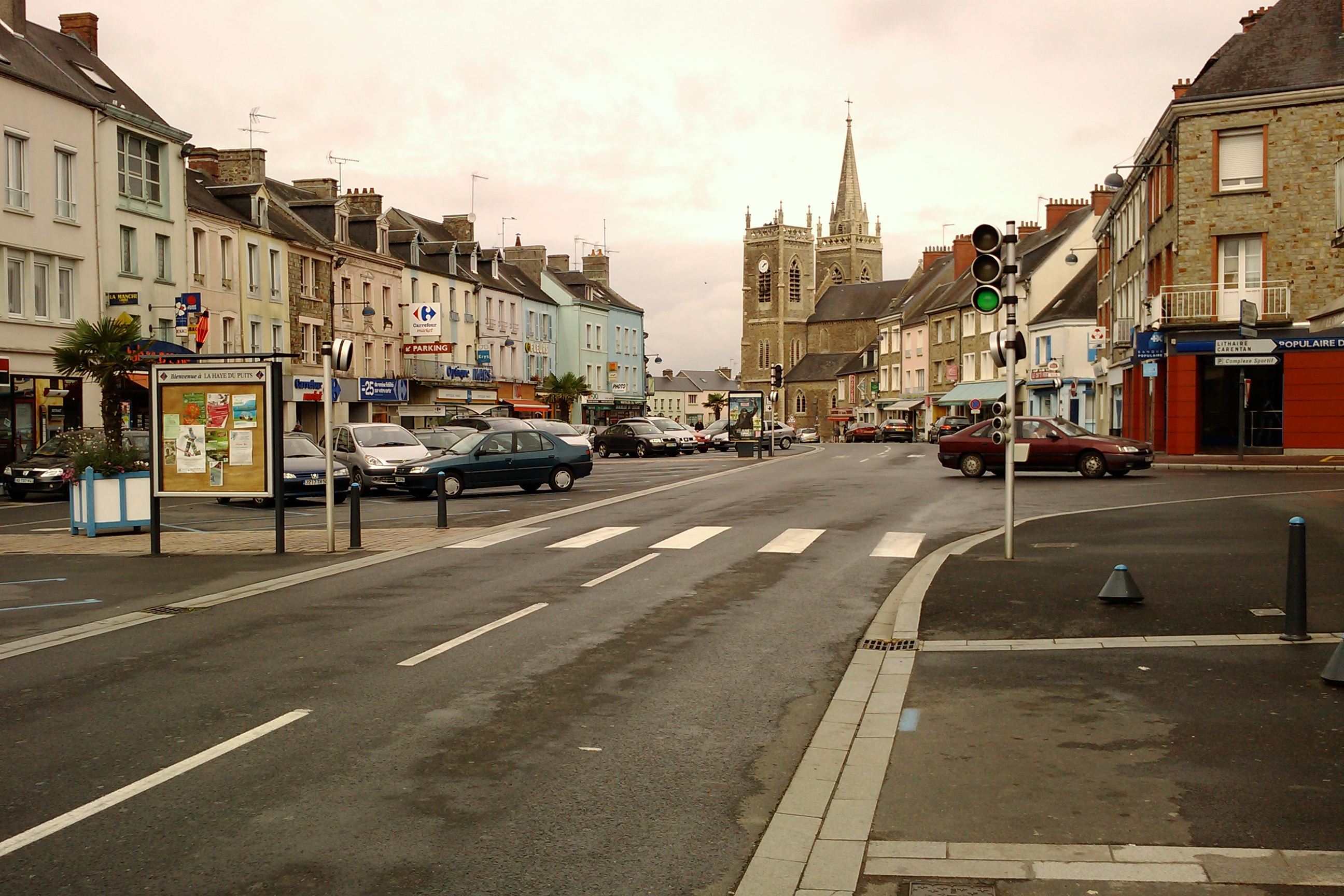
- The centre of La Haye-du-Puits at Général-de-Gaulle Place
- Location of La Haye
- Location within France Location within Normandy
- Coordinates: 49°17′28″N 1°32′42″W
- Country: France
- Region: Normandy
- Department: Manche
- Arrondissement: Coutances
- Canton: Créances

Government
  - Mayor (2020–2026): Alain Leclere
- Area^{1}: 63.81 km^{2} (24.64 sq mi)
- Population (2023): 4,029
  - Density: 63.14/km^{2} (163.5/sq mi)
- Time zone: UTC+01:00 (CET)
  - Summer (DST): UTC+02:00 (CEST)
- INSEE/Postal code: 50236 /50250
- ^{1} French Land Register data, which excludes lakes, ponds, glaciers > 1 km^{2} (0.386 sq mi or 247 acres) and river estuaries.

La Haye (French pronunciation: [la ɛ]) is a commune in the department of Manche, northwestern France. The municipality was established on 1 January 2016 by merger of the former communes of La Haye-du-Puits (the seat), Baudreville, Bolleville, Glatigny, Mobecq, Montgardon, Saint-Rémy-des-Landes, Saint-Symphorien-le-Valois and Surville.

== Population ==
Population data refer to the area corresponding with the commune as of January 2025.

Historical population
| Year | Pop. | ±% p.a. |
|---|---|---|
| 1968 | 3,869 | — |
| 1975 | 3,864 | −0.02% |
| 1982 | 3,890 | +0.10% |
| 1990 | 4,031 | +0.45% |
| 1999 | 4,166 | +0.37% |
| 2007 | 4,211 | +0.13% |
| 2012 | 4,112 | −0.47% |
| 2017 | 4,006 | −0.52% |
| 2023 | 4,029 | +0.10% |
Source: INSEE

== See also ==
- Communes of the Manche department
