= Surville, Manche =

Surville
- Part of La Haye
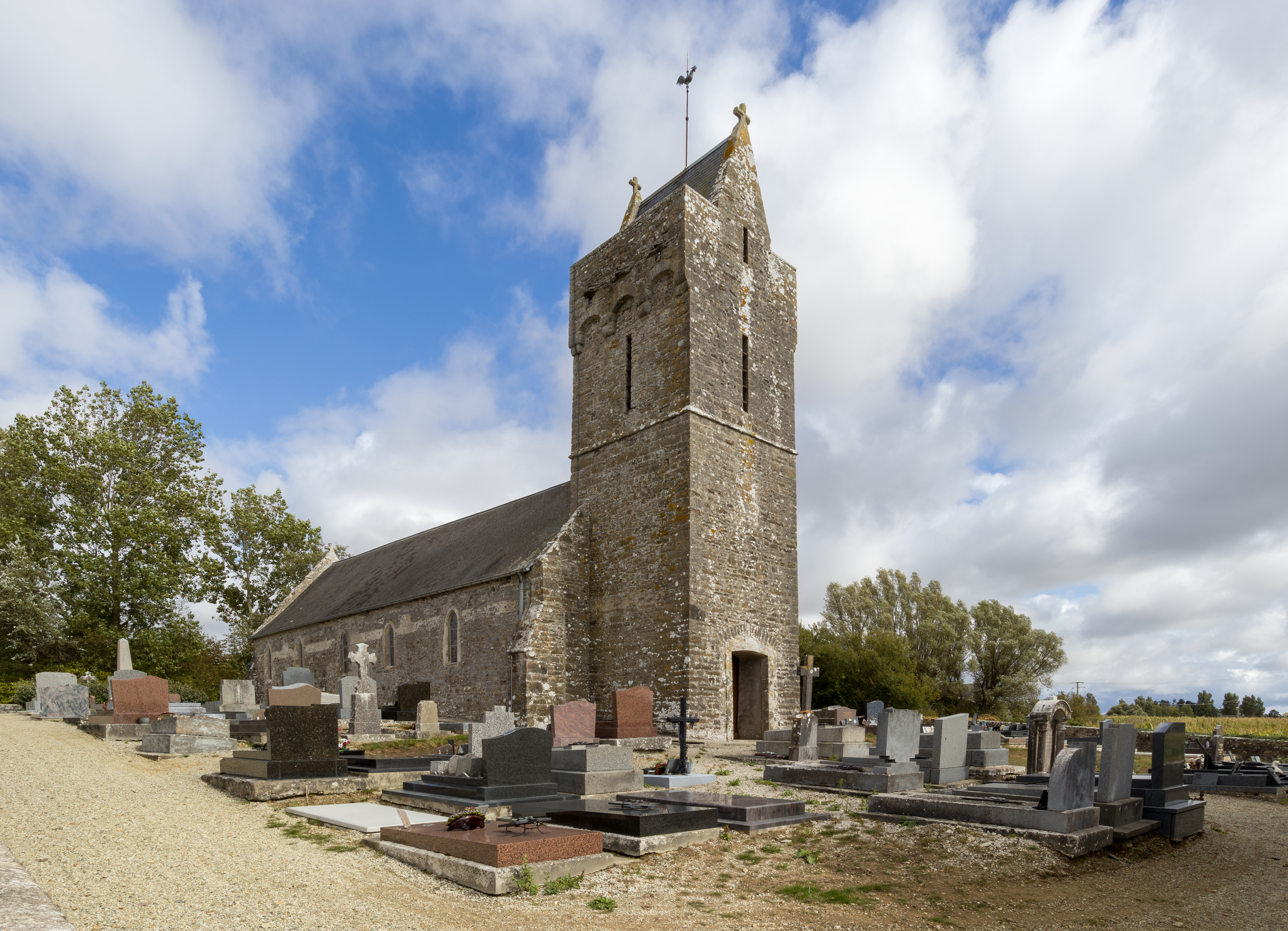

- Coat of arms
- Location of Surville
- Location within France Location within Normandy
- Coordinates: 49°17′00″N 1°38′53″W
- Country: France
- Region: Normandy
- Department: Manche
- Arrondissement: Coutances
- Canton: Créances
- Commune: La Haye
- Area^{1}: 7.40 km^{2} (2.86 sq mi)
- Elevation: 30 m (98 ft)
- Highest elevation: 41 m (135 ft)
- Lowest elevation: 4 m (13 ft)
- Population (2022): 197
  - Density: 26.6/km^{2} (68.9/sq mi)
- Time zone: UTC+01:00 (CET)
  - Summer (DST): UTC+02:00 (CEST)
- Postal code: 50250
- ^{1} French Land Register data, which excludes lakes, ponds, glaciers > 1 km^{2} (0.386 sq mi or 247 acres) and river estuaries.

Surville (French pronunciation: [syʁvil]) is a former commune in the Manche department in Normandy in north-western France. On 1 January 2016, it was merged into the new commune of La Haye.

== See also ==
- Communes of the Manche department
