= Saint-Rémy-des-Landes =

- Part of La Haye
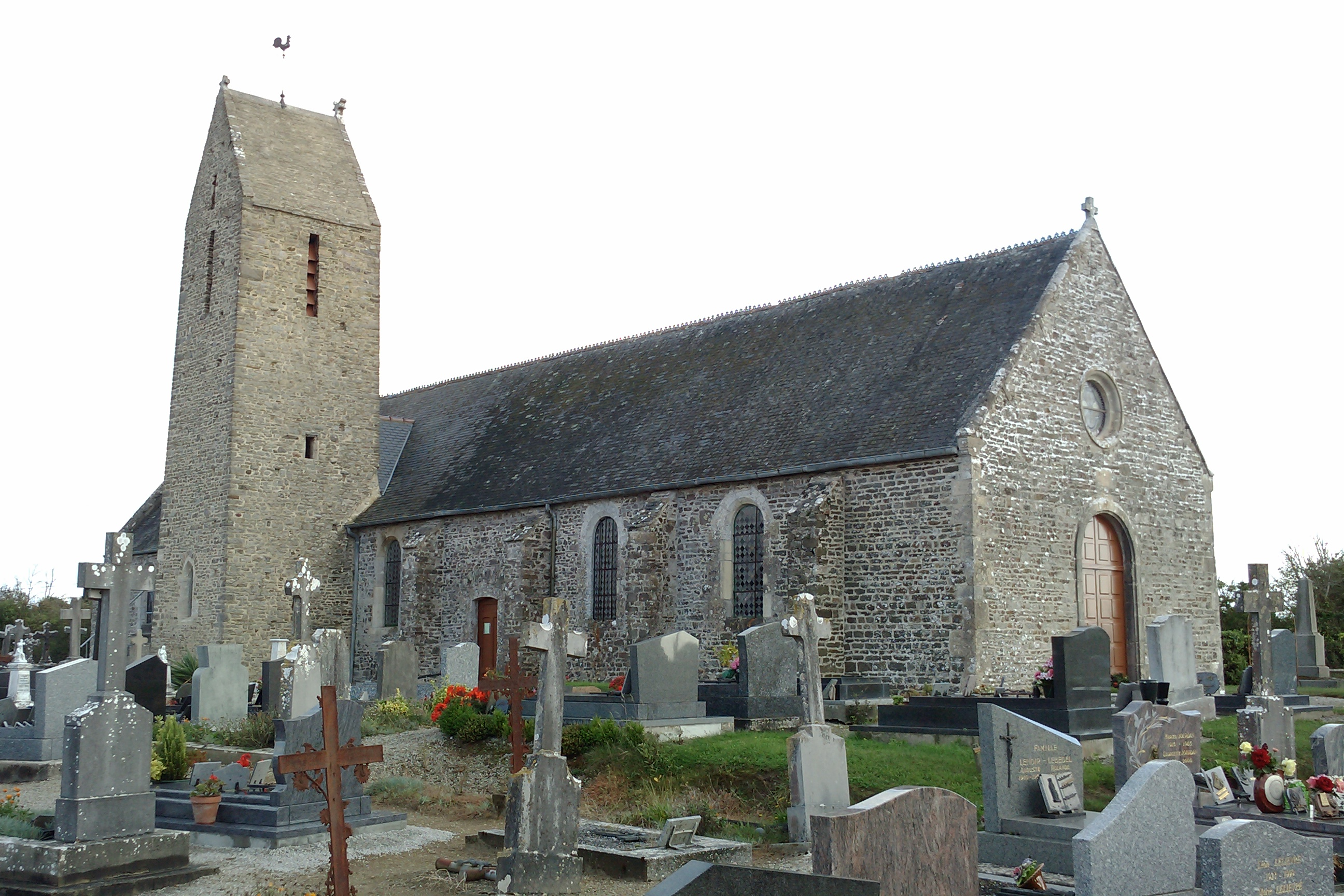
- The church of Saint-Rémy
- Location of Saint-Rémy-des-Landes
- Location within France Location within Normandy
- Coordinates: 49°18′07″N 1°39′19″W
- Country: France
- Region: Normandy
- Department: Manche
- Arrondissement: Coutances
- Canton: Créances
- Commune: La Haye
- Area^{1}: 8.3 km^{2} (3.2 sq mi)
- Elevation: 20 m (66 ft)
- Highest elevation: 39 m (128 ft)
- Lowest elevation: 4 m (13 ft)
- Population (2022): 215
  - Density: 26/km^{2} (67/sq mi)
- Time zone: UTC+01:00 (CET)
  - Summer (DST): UTC+02:00 (CEST)
- Postal code: 50580
- ^{1} French Land Register data, which excludes lakes, ponds, glaciers > 1 km^{2} (0.386 sq mi or 247 acres) and river estuaries.

Saint-Rémy-des-Landes (French pronunciation: [sɛ̃ ʁemi de lɑ̃d]) is a former commune in the Manche department in Normandy in north-western France. On 1 January 2016, it was merged into the new commune of La Haye. Its population was 215 in 2022.

== See also ==
- Communes of the Manche department
