= Angoville-sur-Ay =

- Part of Lessay
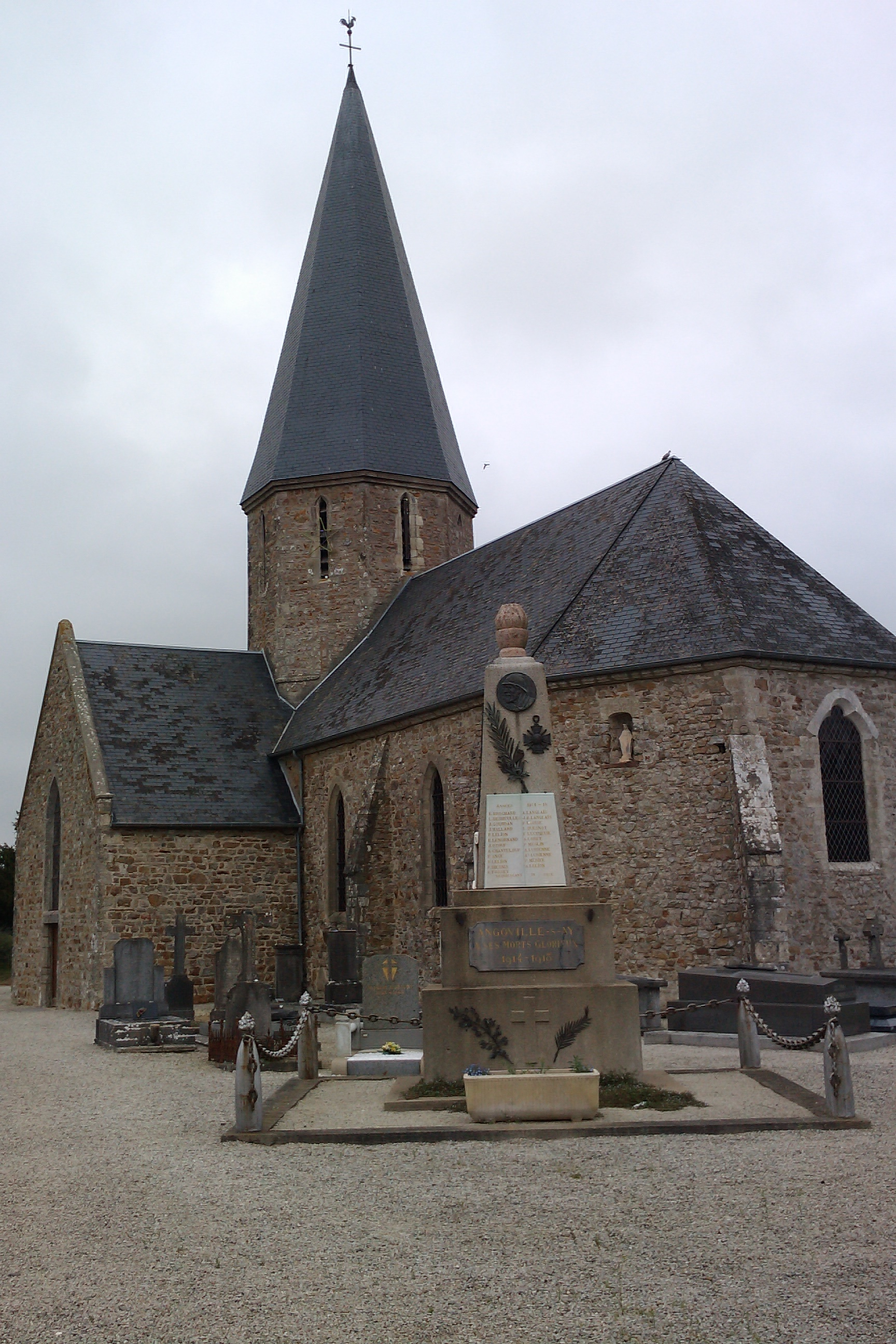
- Notre-Dame church
- Location of Angoville-sur-Ay
- Location within France Location within Normandy
- Coordinates: 49°15′14″N 1°32′49″W
- Country: France
- Region: Normandy
- Department: Manche
- Arrondissement: Coutances
- Canton: Créances
- Commune: Lessay
- Area^{1}: 6.72 km^{2} (2.59 sq mi)
- Elevation: 48 m (157 ft)
- Highest elevation: 54 m (177 ft)
- Lowest elevation: 5 m (16 ft)
- Population (2018): 237
  - Density: 35.3/km^{2} (91.3/sq mi)
- Time zone: UTC+01:00 (CET)
  - Summer (DST): UTC+02:00 (CEST)
- Postal code: 50430
- ^{1} French Land Register data, which excludes lakes, ponds, glaciers > 1 km^{2} (0.386 sq mi or 247 acres) and river estuaries.

Angoville-sur-Ay (French pronunciation: [ɑ̃ɡɔvil syʁ ɛ]) is a former commune in the Manche department in the Normandy region in northwestern France. On 1 January 2016, it was merged into the commune of Lessay.

== Population ==
Historical population

Year	Pop.	±% p.a.
1793	665	—
1821	794	+0.64%
1846	688	−0.57%
1872	605	−0.49%
1901	486	−0.75%
1926	359	−1.20%
1946	277	−1.29%

Year	Pop.	±% p.a.
1962	279	+0.04%
1968	222	−3.74%
1975	213	−0.59%
1982	172	−3.01%
1990	202	+2.03%
1999	230	+1.45%
2018	237	+0.16%

Source: EHESS and INSEE

== See also ==
- Communes of the Manche department
