= Montgardon =

- Part of La Haye
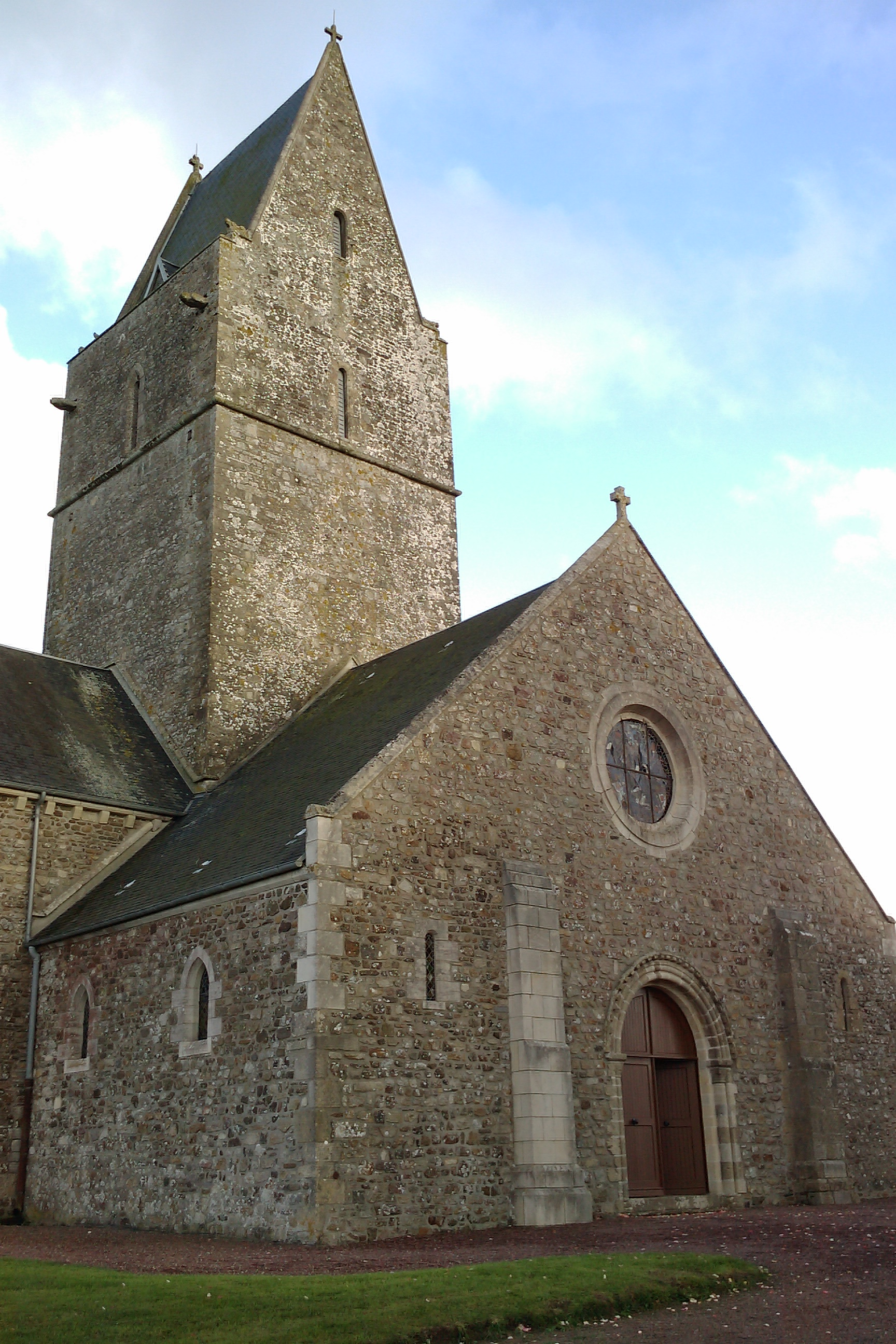
- The church of Notre-Dame
- Location of Montgardon
- Location within France Location within Normandy
- Coordinates: 49°16′52″N 1°34′18″W
- Country: France
- Region: Normandy
- Department: Manche
- Arrondissement: Coutances
- Canton: Créances
- Commune: La Haye
- Area^{1}: 13.32 km^{2} (5.14 sq mi)
- Elevation: 85 m (279 ft)
- Highest elevation: 88 m (289 ft)
- Lowest elevation: 9 m (30 ft)
- Population (2022): 469
  - Density: 35.2/km^{2} (91.2/sq mi)
- Time zone: UTC+01:00 (CET)
  - Summer (DST): UTC+02:00 (CEST)
- Postal code: 50250
- ^{1} French Land Register data, which excludes lakes, ponds, glaciers > 1 km^{2} (0.386 sq mi or 247 acres) and river estuaries.

Montgardon (French pronunciation: [mɔ̃ɡaʁdɔ̃]) is a former commune in the Manche department in Normandy in north-western France. On 1 January 2016, it was merged into the new commune of La Haye.

== See also ==
- Communes of the Manche department
