= Baudreville, Manche =

Baudreville
- Part of La Haye
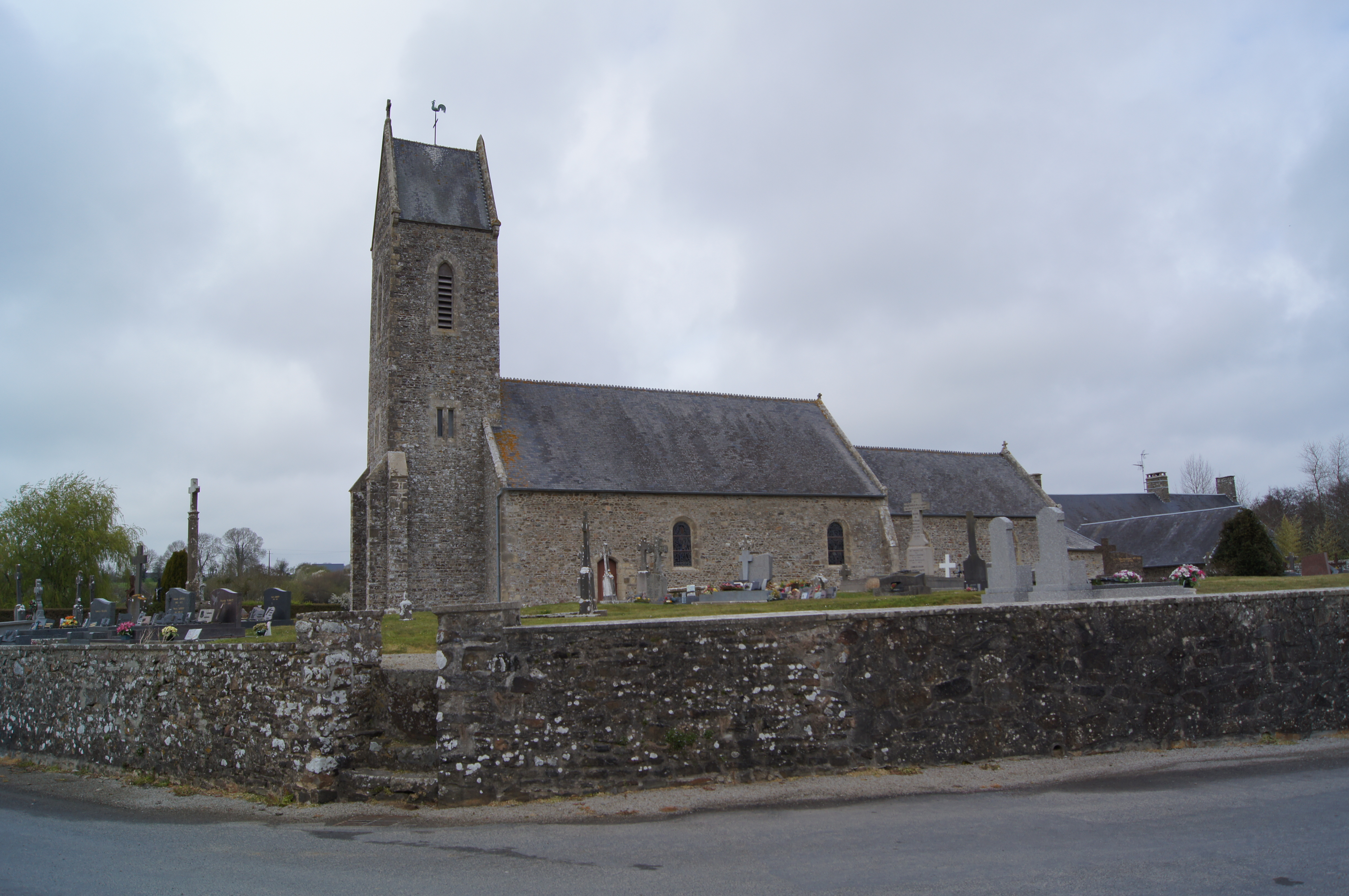
- Location of Baudreville
- Location within France Location within Normandy
- Coordinates: 49°18′22″N 1°37′49″W
- Country: France
- Region: Normandy
- Department: Manche
- Arrondissement: Coutances
- Canton: Créances
- Commune: La Haye
- Area^{1}: 4.67 km^{2} (1.80 sq mi)
- Highest elevation: 41 m (135 ft)
- Lowest elevation: 7 m (23 ft)
- Population (2023): 84
  - Density: 18/km^{2} (47/sq mi)
- Time zone: UTC+01:00 (CET)
  - Summer (DST): UTC+02:00 (CEST)
- Postal code: 50250
- ^{1} French Land Register data, which excludes lakes, ponds, glaciers > 1 km^{2} (0.386 sq mi or 247 acres) and river estuaries.

Baudreville (French pronunciation: [bodʁəvil]) is a former commune in the Manche department in the Normandy region in northwestern France. Between 1973 and 1980, it was part of the commune Pierrepont-en-Cotentin. On 1 January 2016, it was merged into the new commune of La Haye.

== See also ==
- Communes of the Manche department
