= Bolleville, Manche =

Bolleville
- Part of La Haye
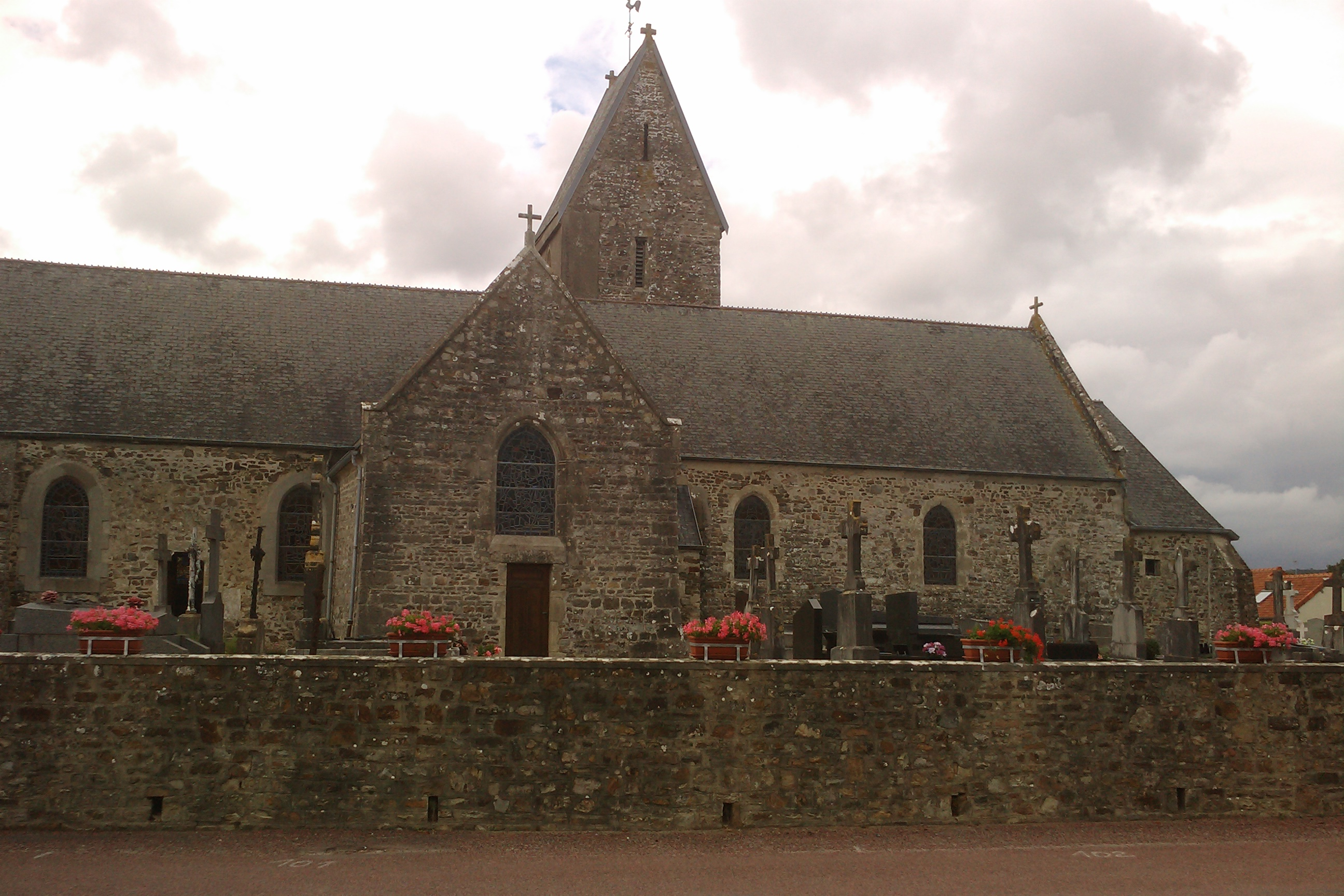
- Location of Bolleville
- Location within France Location within Normandy
- Coordinates: 49°18′06″N 1°34′28″W
- Country: France
- Region: Normandy
- Department: Manche
- Arrondissement: Coutances
- Canton: Créances
- Commune: La Haye
- Area^{1}: 6.09 km^{2} (2.35 sq mi)
- Elevation: 32 m (105 ft)
- Highest elevation: 44 m (144 ft)
- Lowest elevation: 7 m (23 ft)
- Population (2023): 402
  - Density: 66.0/km^{2} (171/sq mi)
- Time zone: UTC+01:00 (CET)
  - Summer (DST): UTC+02:00 (CEST)
- Postal code: 50250
- ^{1} French Land Register data, which excludes lakes, ponds, glaciers > 1 km^{2} (0.386 sq mi or 247 acres) and river estuaries.

Bolleville (French pronunciation: [bɔlvil]) is a former commune in the Manche department in Normandy in northwestern France. Between 1973 and 1983, it was part of the commune Pierrepont-en-Cotentin. On 1 January 2016, it was merged into the new commune of La Haye.

== See also ==
- Communes of the Manche department
