= Glatigny, Manche =

Glatigny
- Part of La Haye
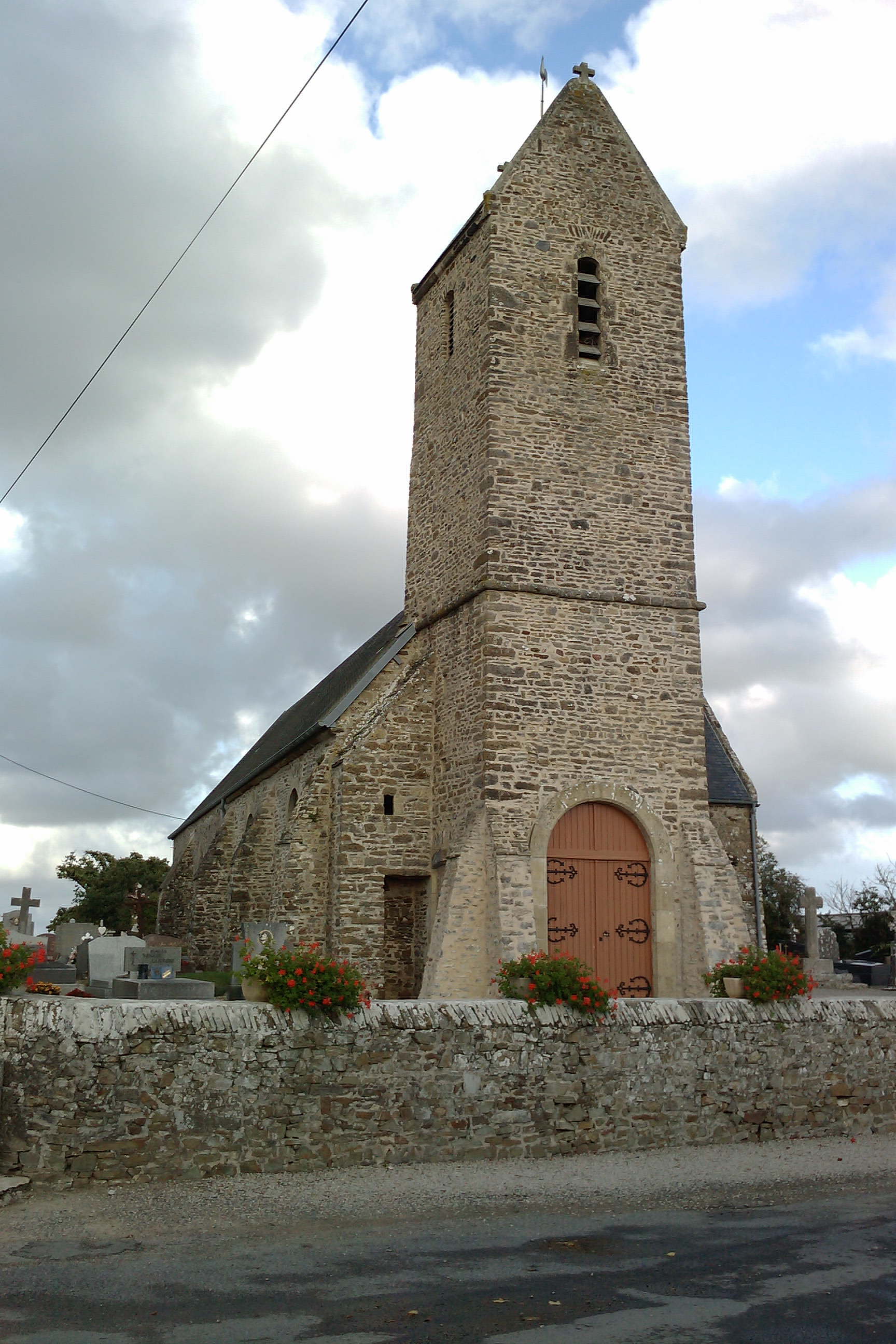
- The church of Saint-Pierre
- Location of Glatigny
- Location within France Location within Normandy
- Coordinates: 49°16′41″N 1°37′45″W
- Country: France
- Region: Normandy
- Department: Manche
- Arrondissement: Coutances
- Canton: Créances
- Commune: La Haye
- Area^{1}: 4.99 km^{2} (1.93 sq mi)
- Elevation: 18 m (59 ft)
- Highest elevation: 34 m (112 ft)
- Lowest elevation: 5 m (16 ft)
- Population (2022): 142
  - Density: 28.5/km^{2} (73.7/sq mi)
- Time zone: UTC+01:00 (CET)
  - Summer (DST): UTC+02:00 (CEST)
- Postal code: 50250
- ^{1} French Land Register data, which excludes lakes, ponds, glaciers > 1 km^{2} (0.386 sq mi or 247 acres) and river estuaries.

Glatigny (French pronunciation: [ɡlatiɲi]) is a former commune in the Manche department in north-western France. On 1 January 2016, it was merged into the new commune of La Haye.

== See also ==
- Communes of the Manche department
