= La Haye-du-Puits =

- Part of La Haye
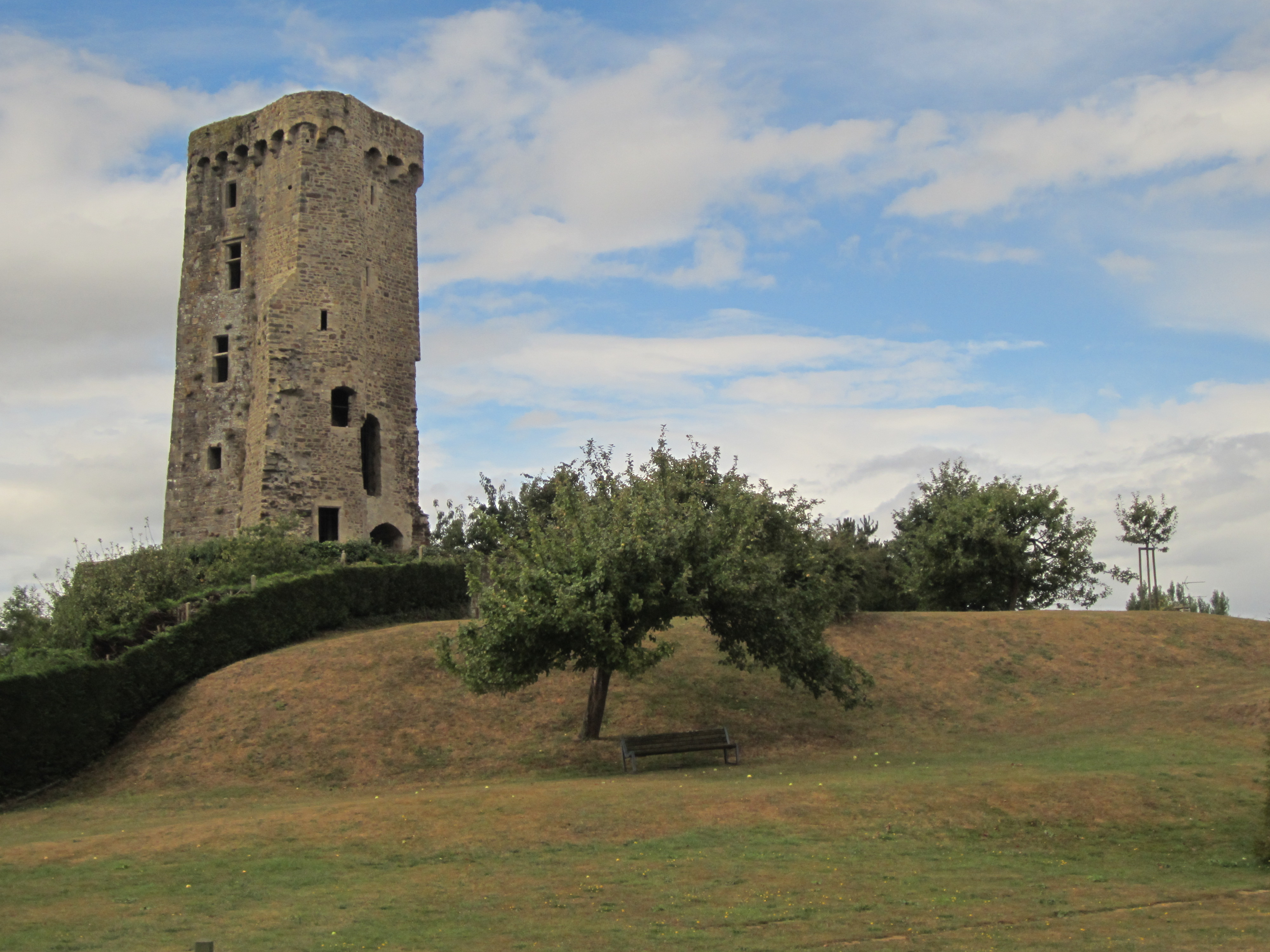
- The ruined keep of La Haye-du-Puits castle
- Location of La Haye-du-Puits
- Location within France Location within Normandy
- Coordinates: 49°17′27″N 1°32′28″W
- Country: France
- Region: Normandy
- Department: Manche
- Arrondissement: Coutances
- Canton: Créances
- Commune: La Haye
- Area^{1}: 5.25 km^{2} (2.03 sq mi)
- Elevation: 37 m (121 ft)
- Highest elevation: 94 m (308 ft)
- Lowest elevation: 29 m (95 ft)
- Population (2022): 1,478
  - Density: 282/km^{2} (729/sq mi)
- Demonym: Haytillons
- Time zone: UTC+01:00 (CET)
  - Summer (DST): UTC+02:00 (CEST)
- Postal code: 50250
- ^{1} French Land Register data, which excludes lakes, ponds, glaciers > 1 km^{2} (0.386 sq mi or 247 acres) and river estuaries.

La Haye-du-Puits (French pronunciation: [la ɛ dy pɥi]) is a former commune in the Manche department in Normandy in north-western France. On 1 January 2016, it was merged into the new commune of La Haye.

== Heraldry ==
| Arms of La Haye-du-Puits | The arms of La Haye-du-Puits are blazoned : Gules, an eagle (displayed) argent. These arms are borrowed from the de Magneville family (extinct), former lords of the barony la Haye-du-Puits. |

== See also ==
- History of Witchcraft in La Haye-du-Puits
- Communes of the Manche department
