= Chemins de fer de l'Ouest =

Railway company in western France (1855–1909)

Compagnie des chemins de fer de l'Ouest
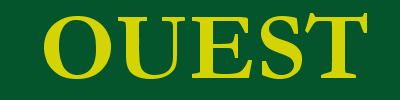

Overview
- Headquarters: Paris
- Locale: Normandy, Paris and Brittany
- Dates of operation: 1855–1909

Technical
- Track gauge: 1,435 mm (4 ft 8 1/2 in) standard gauge

The Compagnie des chemins de fer de l'Ouest (French pronunciation: [kɔ̃paɲi de ʃəmɛ̃ də fɛʁ də lwɛst], lit. 'Western Railway Company', abbr. CF de l'Ouest), often referred to simply as L'Ouest or Ouest, was an early French railway company which operated from the years 1855 through 1909.

== History ==
=== Birth of the company ===
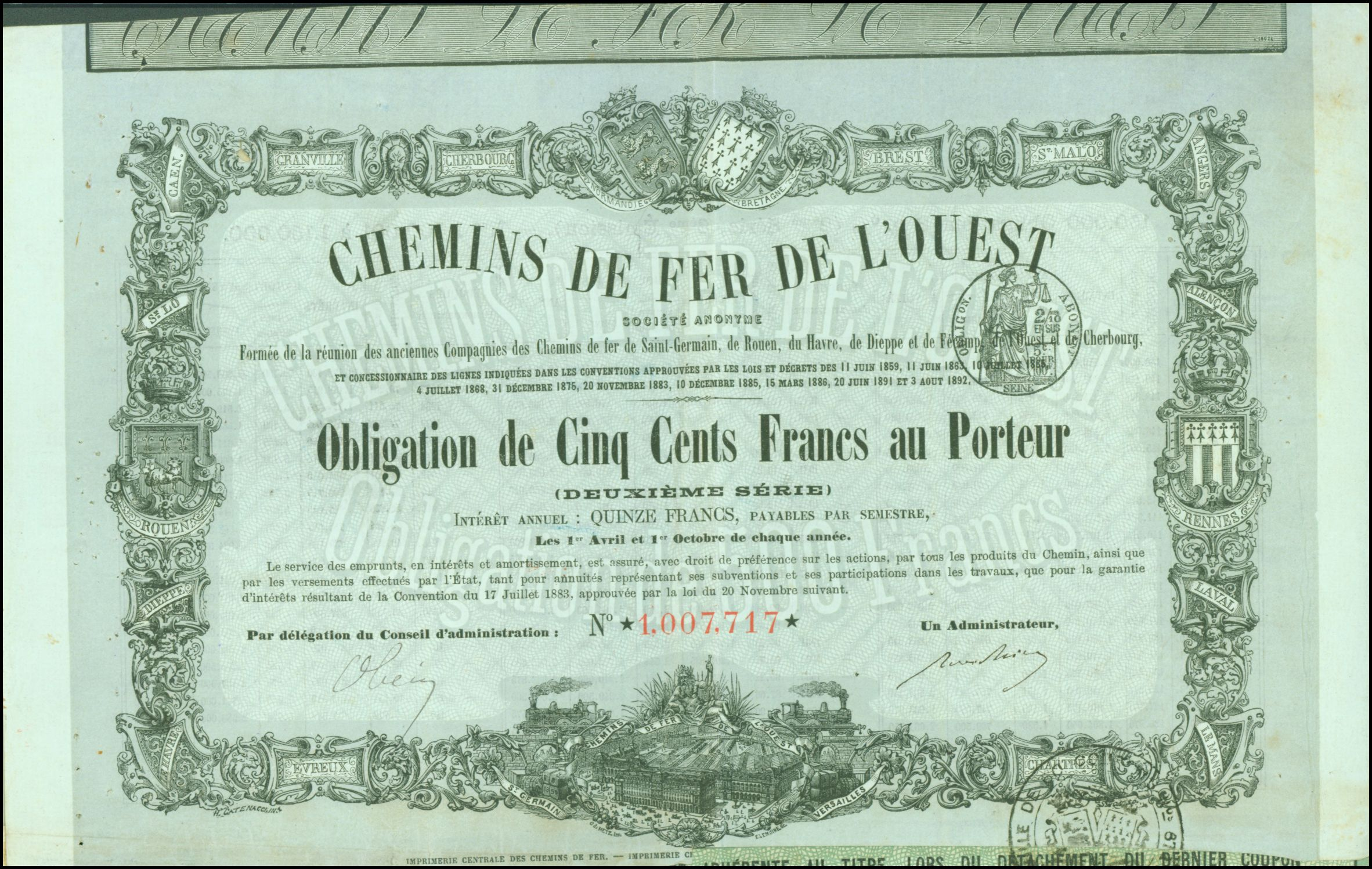
Bond of the Compagnie des Chemins de Fer de l'Ouest, issued 3. August 1892

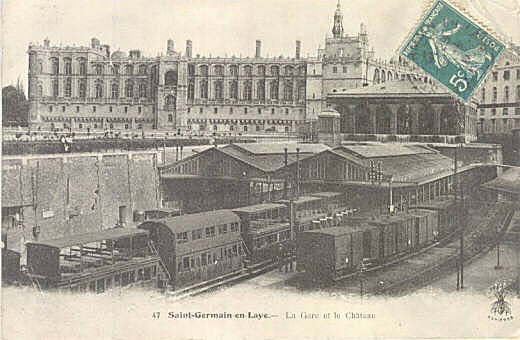
St Germain en Laye train station. The station is now underground.

The Compagnie de l'Ouest was created in 1855 by the merger of various small railway companies active in the western outskirts of Paris, in Normandy and in Brittany. These were:

- Paris à Saint-Germain
- Paris à Rouen
- Rouen au Havre
- Dieppe à Fécamp
- Paris à Caen et à Cherbourg
- the old Ouest (two lines from Paris to Versailles and Paris–Rennes)

==== Paris à Saint-Germain ====
The Ouest's oldest line (still open to this day) is the line from Paris to Le Pecq, built by Émile Pereire's Compagnie du chemin de fer de Paris à Saint-Germain and inaugurated on 24 August 1837 by Marie-Amélie, wife of King Louis-Philippe. The line was 19 km (12 mi) long and the trip took 30 minutes. Initially greeted with fear and lack of interest, the railway was a success that paved the way for other new railways, for instance to Rouen. In 1847, the line to Le Pecq was extended to Saint-Germain-en-Laye. The section between Saint-Germain-en-Laye and Nanterre-Université is now part of the RER line A. The section between Paris Saint-Lazare and Nanterre is part of the main lines to Rouen and Caen.

==== The old Ouest ====
While the line to Saint-Germain-en-Laye was being built, a line to Versailles, another popular Sunday destination, was projected. Two lines were built, one from Gare Saint-Lazare to the terminus Versailles Rive Droite, the other from Gare Montparnasse (Barrière du Maine) to the terminus Versailles Rive Gauche. James Mayer de Rothschild in conjunction with the Chemin de Fer de Versailles-Rive-Droite, created in 1837, were given the concession to operate the lines. The line to Versailles-Rive-Droite, opened on 4 August 1839 and still in use today as Transilien line L, is 19 km (12 mi) long, branching off the line to Saint-Germain at Asnières-sur-Seine. The line to Versailles-Rive-Gauche is also still in use today. The part between Montparnasse and Viroflay is used by trains from Paris to Chartres and Brittany as well as Transition Line N. The part between Viroflay and Versailles is used by RER C local trains.

==== Paris à Rouen ====
Two lines to Rouen in Normandy were projected: one passing through La Garenne-Colombes and following the left Seine bank from Poissy, the other passing through Pontoise and following the high plateaux on the right Seine bank. Due to the lack of confidence in the second project, the first one was granted and the concession given to Charles Laffitte and Edouard Blount. Construction began in 1841 under the orders of engineer Joseph Locke and with the help of British workers. Inauguration of the line was on 9 May 1843. It was an immediate success, so much so that issues with the Chemin de Fer de Saint-Germain with platform allocation at Gare Saint-Lazare occurred.

=== Expansion ===
The Imperial Government imposed the construction of several lines:

- Argentan – Granville
- Rennes – Brest
- Rennes – Saint-Malo
- Rennes – Redon
- Le Mans – Angers
- Serquigny – Rouen
- Lisieux – Honfleur
- Mézidon-Canon – Le Mans

The Government also imposed several secondary lines.

The network was rapidly expanded:

To better use the Rive-Droite line, a 15 km (9 mi) long branch was built from Saint-Cloud to Saint-Nom-la-Bretèche at the cost of the French State. The line was declared of public utility in 1880 and the Chemins de fer de l'Ouest opened the line to l'Étang-la-Ville in 1884. Passenger services were extended to Saint-Germain Grande-Ceinture in 1889, services were then reported back to Saint-Nom-la-Bretèche in 1894 when passenger services on the Chemin de fer de Grande Ceinture were stopped.

A second line from Saint-Lazare to Mantes-la-Jolie was opened in 1892, following the right Seine bank. The new line started at Argenteuil, and passed Conflans-Sainte-Honorine, Triel and Meulan.

Because of the company's bad financial situation due to the region it served (agricultural for the most part), the law of 13 July 1908 saw the integration of the Companie des Chemins de fer de l'Ouest into the Chemins de fer de l'État on 1 January 1909.

=== Accidents ===
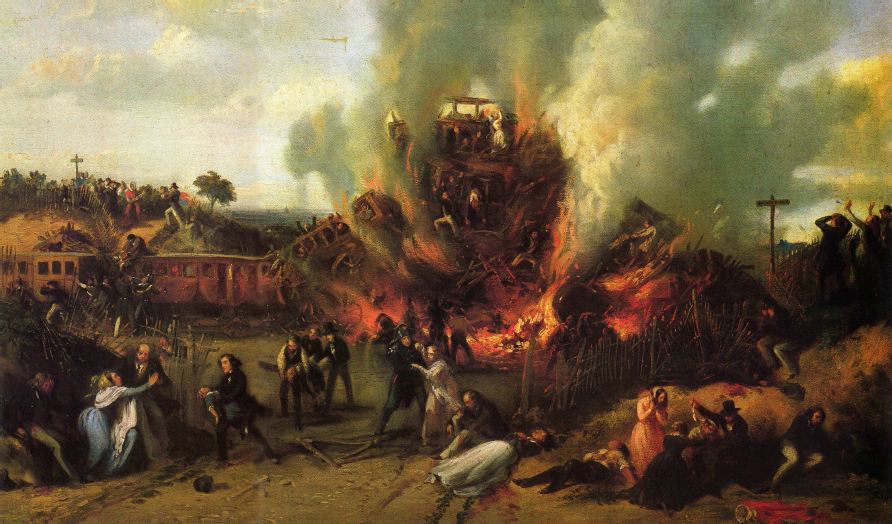
A painting of the 1842 accident

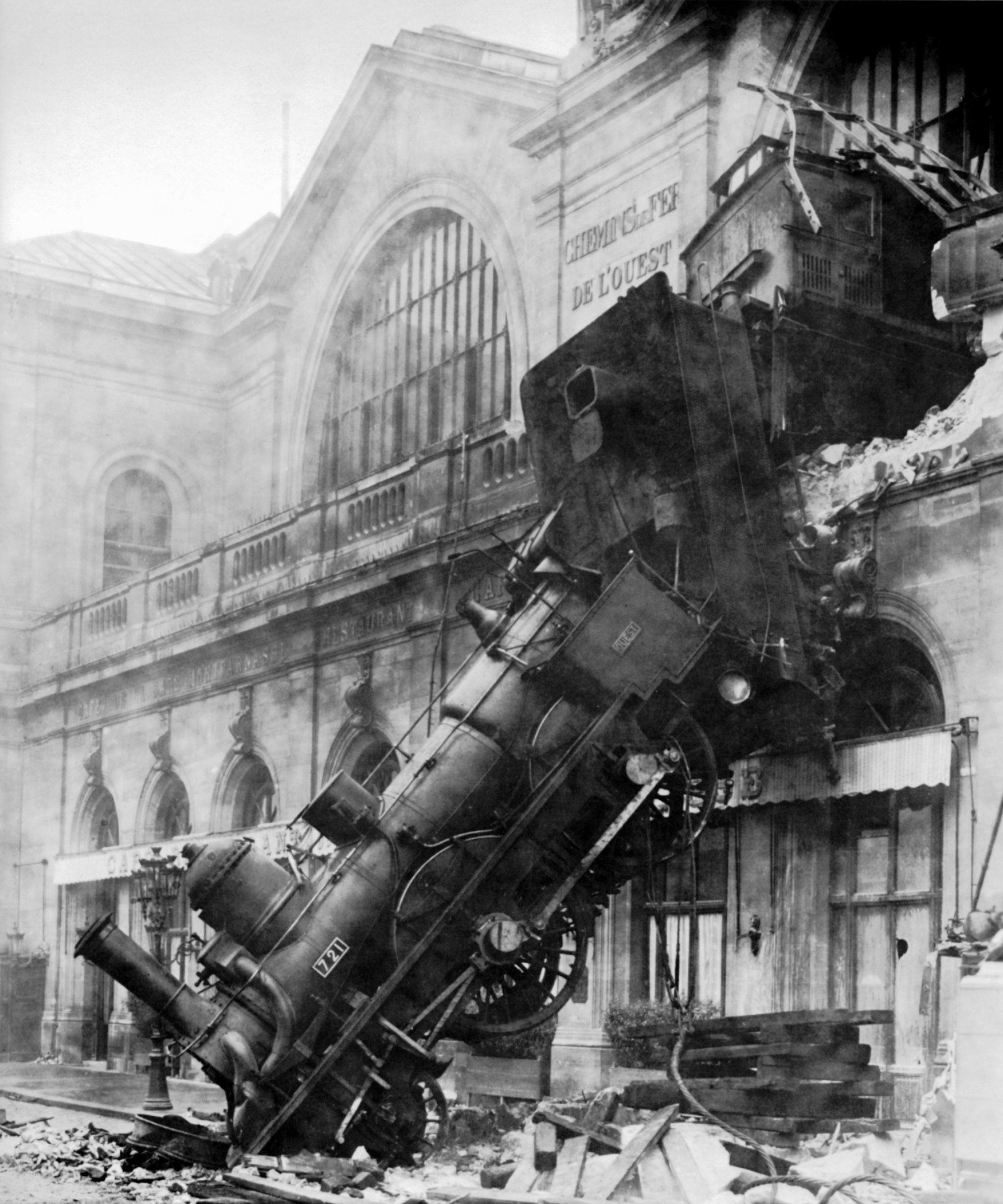
Train goes too far at Gare Montparnasse, Paris 1895

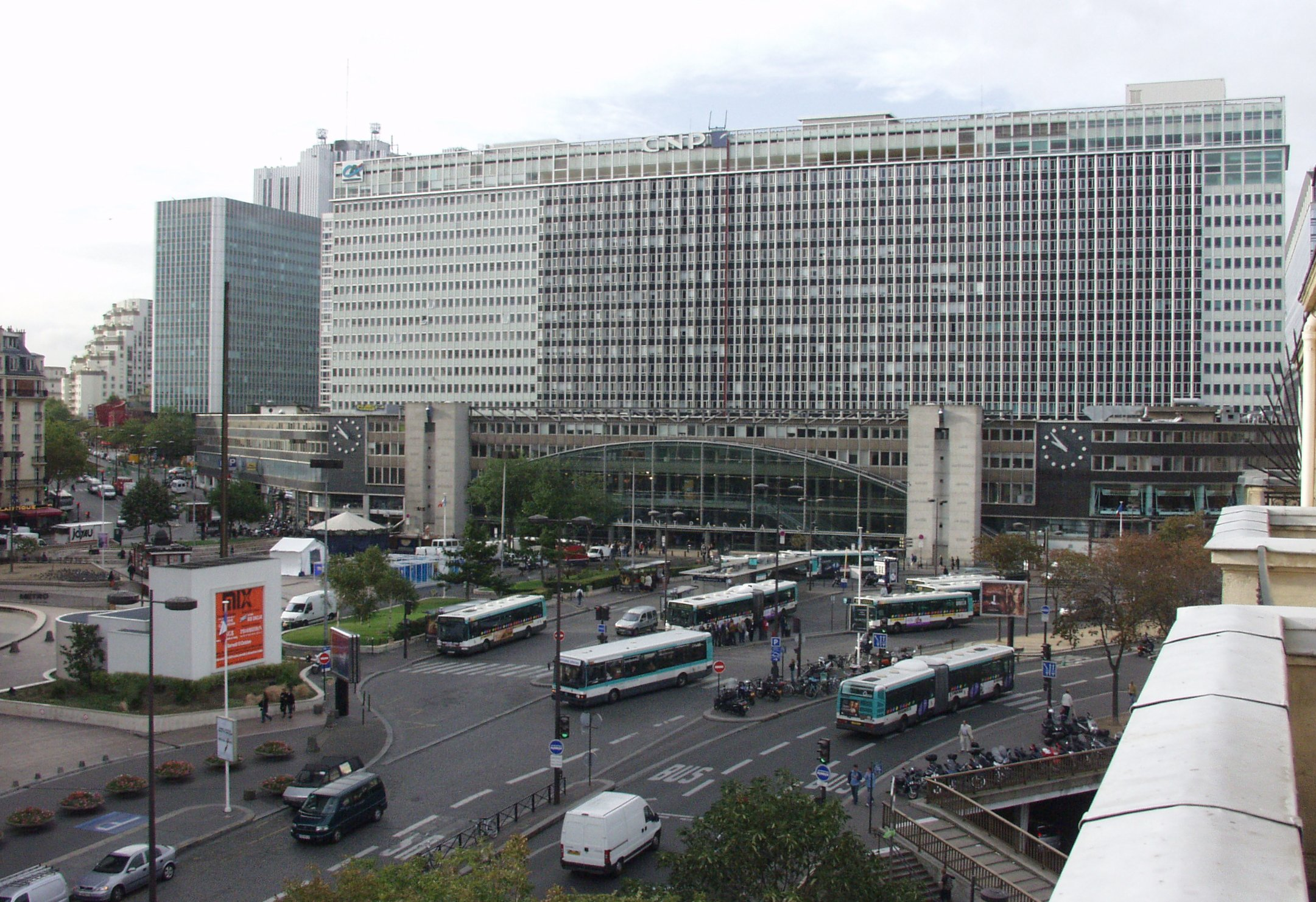
Gare de Paris-Montparnasse, Paris 2007

- On a Sunday in May 1842, one of the worst accidents in French railway history happened near Meudon: 164 victims; the 55 dead were burnt alive (see Versailles train crash). After this incident the company no longer locked doors on passenger coaches.
- Montparnasse derailment: On 22 October 1895 an express train originating from Granville traversed Montparnasse station, ploughed into the buffers, wrecked the station building's front wall and dropped to the ground on the street below. The only fatality was the wife of a newspaper vendor, filling in for her husband (who had gone to get the evening newspapers), who was killed by falling masonry from the wall.
- In 1881 there were 2064 railway related accidents: 185 derailings, 190 collisions, 692 accidents on the line. 512 passengers died in these accidents, 1/10 of those who died in accidents on stagecoaches.
- Lists of rail accidents

=== Paris stations ===
L'Ouest built several stations within Paris; the two main terminals St-Lazare and Montparnasse as well as Pont Cardinet at the beginning of the line to Auteuil.

In 1851 the Ouest's Paris terminus, the Gare Saint-Lazare, was enlarged to comprise six groups for each main destination served:

- Group I & II: Versailles
- Group III: Auteuil
- Group IV: Argenteuil
- Group V: Saint-Germain-en-Laye
- Group VI: Rouen, Le Havre & Dieppe (the line to Caen served by this group was not opened until 1855)

=== La Ligne d'Auteuil ===
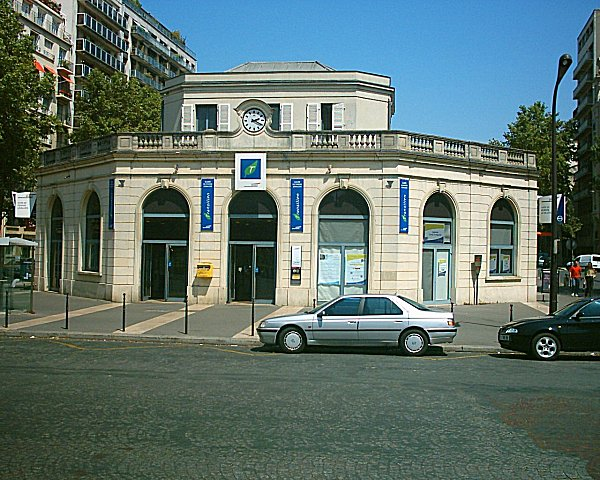
Courcelles–Levallois station, now part of Paris's RER C line but originally part of La Ligne d'Auteuil.

L'Ouest was the first company to pioneer suburban transport. St-Lazare station was by 1931 dealing with 13.2 million passengers annually compared to merely 3 million in average in the other Parisian stations. In 1854 L'Ouest opened a typically Parisian line; 'La Ligne d'Auteuil'. This line started within Paris and ended in Paris, serving the Parisian inhabitants mainly for work purposes. The line was 7 kilometres long (4.3 mi) and served St Lazare, Bâtignoles, Courcelles–Levallois, Neuilly–Porte Maillot, Avenue du Bois de Boulogne, Avenue Henri Martin, Boulainvilliers, Passy and Auteuil. The line was built in a cutting, removing the need for any level crossing, which was the first line of its kind. The line also boasted elegant station buildings such as the Auteuil terminus and Courcelles–Levallois station. All stations were built above the line with access to the platforms. The line was part of the Petite Ceinture circular line, which linked all Parisian termini for freight purposes.

=== Line openings ===
Date	Section	Length (km)
26 August 1837	Paris St Lazare – Le Pecq	19
2 August 1839	Asnières – Versailles Rive Droite	18
10 September 1840	Paris Barrière du Maine – Versailles Rive Gauche	17
9 May 1843	Paris St Lazare – Rouen Saint-Sever	
22 March 1847	Rouen Saint-Sever – Le Havre	94
14 August 1847	Le Pecq – Saint-Germain-en-Laye	3
1 August 1848	Malaunay – Dieppe	50
12 July 1849	Viroflay – Chartres	73
28 April 1851	Asnières – Argenteuil	4
20 July 1852	Viroflay – Porchefontaine	1
7 September 1852	Chartres – La Loupe	36
16 February 1854	La Loupe – Nogent-le-Rotrou	25
2 May 1854	Les Batignoles – Auteuil	7
1 June 1854	Nogent-le-Rotrou – Le Mans	63
1 July 1855	Mantes-la-Jolie – Lisieux	133
14 August 1855	Le Mans – Laval	89
29 December 1855	Lisieux – Mondeville (near Caen)	49
25 February 1856	Beuzeville – Fécamp	20
15 March 1856	Le Mans – Alençon	52
1 May 1857	Laval – Rennes	73
1 May 1857	Mondeville–Caen	2
1 February 1858	Alençon – Argentan	43
1 July 1858	Lisieux – Pont-l'Évêque	18
17 July 1858	Caen – Cherbourg	133
20 November 1858	Through Fécamp	2
1 February 1859	Argentan – Mézidon-Canon	43
1 November 1859	Falaise	7
1 May 1860	Lison – St-Lô	19
7 July 1862	Pont-l'Évêque – Honfleur	25
23 March 1863	Le Mans – Sablé	48
7 July 1863	Pont-L'Évêque – Trouville-Deauville	10
7 December 1863	Sablé – Angers	47
15 June 1864	Saint-Cyr-l'École – Dreux	59
27 June 1864	Rennes – Saint-Malo	81
24 July 1865	Serquigny – Oissel	57
2 July 1866	Argentan – flers	43
1 October 1866	Dreux – L'Aigle	60
5 November 1866	L'Aigle – Conches	40
6 November 1866	Laval – Mayenne	20
23 April 1867	Saint-Pierre-du-Vauvray – Louviers	7
5 August 1867	L'Aigle – Surdon	41
23 August 1867	Glos-Montfort – Pont-Audemer	17
16 September 1867	Flers – Vire	29
4 October 1867	Pontoise – Gisors	40
9 November 1868	Flers – Berjou-Pont-d'Ouilly	19
28 December 1868	Gisors – Pont-de-l'Arche	54
15 July 1869	Gisors – Vernonnet	36
14 February 1870	Rouen – Le Petit-Quevilly	3
15 May 1870	Vernonnet – Vernon	2
3 July 1870	Vire – Granville	57
25 January 1872	Fougères – Saint-Brice-en-Coglès	18
10 May 1872	Louviers – Évreux	26
10 October 1872	Saint-Brice-en-Coglès – Moidrey	29
1 May 1873	Vernon – Pacy-sur-Eure	19
6 May 1873	Alençon – Condé-sur-Huisne	66
10 May 1873	Caen – Berjou-Pont-d'Ouilly	46
2 June 1873	Lisieux – Orbec	18
2 August 1873	Chartres – Dreux	42
22 December 1873	Neufchâtel-en-Bray – Dieppe	34
15 April 1874	Falaise – Berjou-Pont-d'Ouilly	28
18 May 1874	Flers – Domfront	21
21 September 1874	Domfront – Mayenne	38
15 August 1875	Louviers – Caudebec-lès-Elbeuf	18
14 January 1876	Caudebec-lès-Elbeuf – Elbeuf	1
1 July 1876	Motteville – Clères	22
1 October 1878	Harfleur – Montivilliers	5
30 December 1878	Saint-Lô – Coutances	29
30 December 1878	Avranches – Dol-de-Bretagne	43
15 June 1879	Mézidon – Dives-sur-Mer	28
29 December 1879	Coutances – Lamballe	112
11 June 1880	Motteville – Cany	38
19 September 1880	Alençon – Pré-en-Pail	27
22 November 1880	Sainte-Gauburge – Gacé	17
3 January 1881	Mamers – Bellême	20
11 April 1881	Redon – Châteaubriant	45
26 May 1881	La Ferté-Macé – Couterne	15
26 May 1881	Pré-en-Pail – Domfront	41
20 June 1881	Bréauté-Beuzeville – Bolbec	5
20 June 1881	Barentin – Duclair	14
20 June 1881	Through Courbevoie	2
27 June 1881	Questembert – Ploërmel	34
9 October 1881	Gacé – Ticheville-Le Sap	13
16 October 1881	Bellême – Mortagne	18
23 October 1881	Pré-en-Pail – La Selle-en-Luitré	86
13 November 1881	Plouaret – Lannion	16
22 November 1881	Échauffour – Bernay	46
28 December 1881	Châteaubriant – Vitré	98
28 December 1881	Mortagne-au-Perche – L'Aigle	37
29 December 1881	Mortagne-au-Perche – Sainte-Gauburge	35
24 July 1882	Auray – Quiberon	26
31 July 1882	Duclair – Caudebec-en-Caux	15
31 July 1882	Bolbec – Lillebonne	9
4 September 1882	Achères – Versailles-Matelots (GC)	23
18 September 1882	La Trinité-de-Réville – Orbec	13
18 September 1882	Dives – Beuzeval (Houlgate)	2
18 September 1882	Trouville-Deauville – Villers-sur-Mer	9
8 January 1883	Rouen Rue Verte – Elbeuf	23
30 June 1883	Through Rouen (Rouen Saint-Sever – Rouen Rue Verte)	2
22 October 1883	Pontorson – Mont Saint-Michel	1
27 January 1884	Sottevast – Coutances	72
6 April 1884	Ploërmel – La Brohinière	41
6 April 1884	Miniac – La Gouesnière	12
5 May 1884	Saint-Cloud – L'Etang-la-Ville	15
26 May 1884	Sablé – Sillé-le-Guillaume	44
20 July 1884	Beuzeval (Houlgate) – Villers-sur-Mer	9
18 May 1885	Châteaubriant – Saint-Nazaire	72
18 May 1885	Saint-Mars-la-Jaille – Nantes	49
22 August 1885	Eu – Dieppe	37
27 July 1886	Verneuil-sur-Avre – Damville	28
22 August 1886	Caen – Aunay-Saint-Georges	32
18 April 1887	Saint-Brieuc – Légué	6
10 July 1887	Dinan – Dinard	18
21 August 1887	Dreux – Maintenon	25
18 December 1887	Mortain – Vire	30
20 December 1887	Saint-Aubin-du-Vieil-Évreux – Évreux	7
2 January 1888	Évreux – Le Neubourg	24
1 July 1888	Le Neubourg – Glos-Montfort	24
1 July 1888	Saint-Aubin-du-Vieil-Évreux – Damville	20
2 December 1888	Pouancé – Laval	58
1 May 1889	Javel – Puteaux	12
8 June 1889	Pont-Audemer – Quetteville	16
16 June 1889	Pontaubault – Mortain-Le Neufbourg	39
11 July 1889	Saint-Georges-Motel – Prey	24
11 November 1889	Verneuil-sur-Avre- La Loupe	39
1 June 1891	Aunay-Saint-Georges – Vire	40
3 April 1892	Auneau – Maintenon	25
3 April 1892	Saint-Lô – Guilberville	25
1 June 1892	Argenteuil – Mantes	52
12 November 1893	Domfront – Romagny	27
8 July 1894	Carentan – La Haye-du-Puits	22
8 July 1894	Fougères – Saint-Hilaire-du-Harcouët	36
22 June 1895	Les Ifs – Étretat	15
31 May 1896	Saint-Pierre-du-Vauvray – Les Andelys	17
26 July 1896	La Brohinière – Dinan	38
9 August 1896	Châteaubriant – Messac	41
14 August 1896	Rolleville – Montivilliers	6
24 December 1896	Rolleville – Les Ifs	22
20 February 1898	Dieppe – Saint-Vaast-Bosville	37
12 April 1900	Courcelles-Levallois – Champ de Mars	4
12 April 1900	Champ de Mars – Invalides	4
30 August 1900	Épône – Plaisir-Grignon	18
25 October 1900	Cany – Fécamp	24
1 July 1901	Issy-les-Moulineaux – Meudon-Val-Fleury	4
19 August 1901	Blain – La Chapelle-sur-Erdre	29
31 May 1902	Meudon-Val-Fleury – Viroflay Rive Gauche	6
3 August 1902	Coutances – Regnéville-sur-Mer	8
5 April 1903	Messac – Ploërmel	51
13 July 1907	Charleval – Vascœuil	10

== Architecture ==
=== A sense of identity ===
As with many other railway companies, the Ouest adopted its own architectural style. Stations in large cities such as Le Havre, Lisieux, Deauville and Paris are unique. More modest halts were graced with 'type' building, which are called 'type Ouest', the best-preserved examples can be found in Dives-sur-Mer and Houlgate. According to the size of the town or village close to the proposed site for the station, a station of a certain size was built. There are three generic types of station buildings; the BV3, BV5 and BV7. BV stands for Bâtiment Voyageur (station building) and the number, the number of doors accessible. The larger the town, the larger the station building.

As well as stations, infrastructure was also in mind when saving money so the Ouest created a level crossing guard house template (see below).

=== Station photos ===
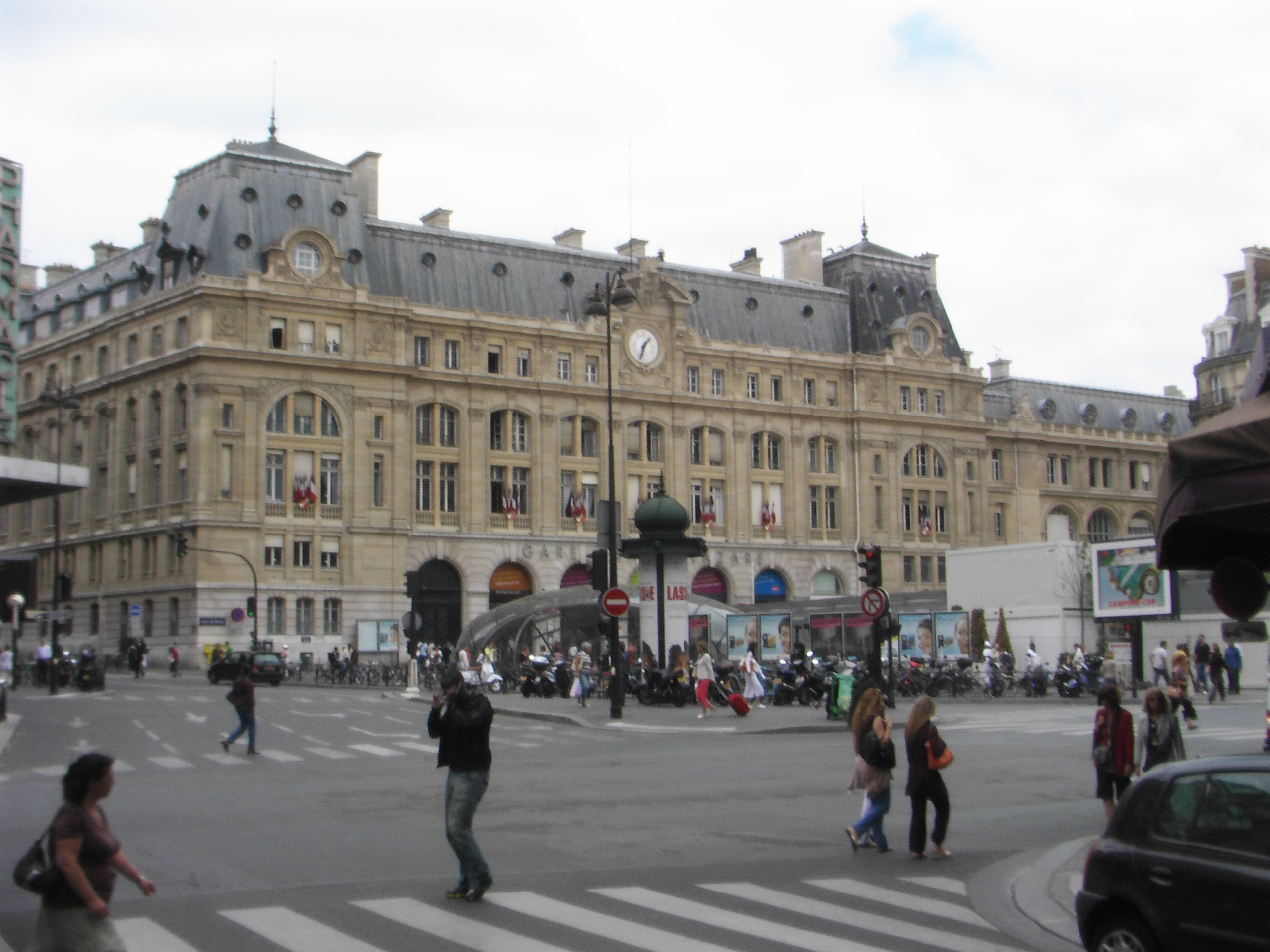
Paris St Lazare station

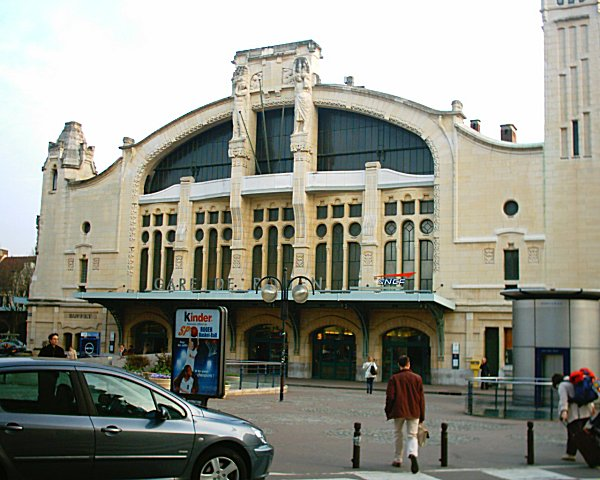
Rouen Rue Verte station

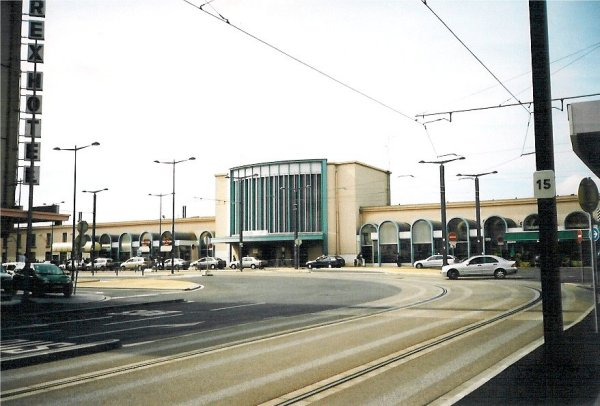
Caen station

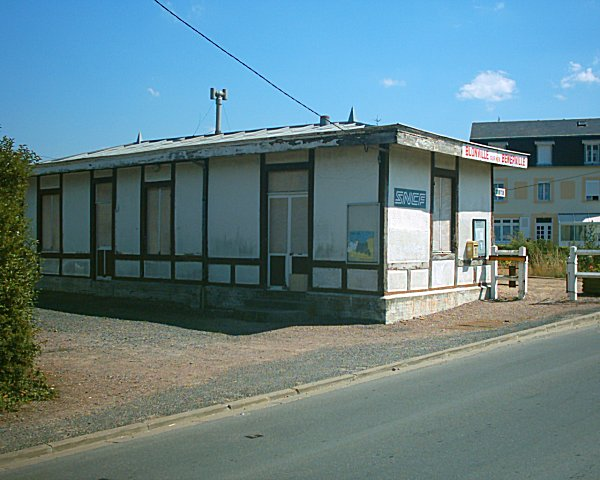
Blonville-Bénèrville station

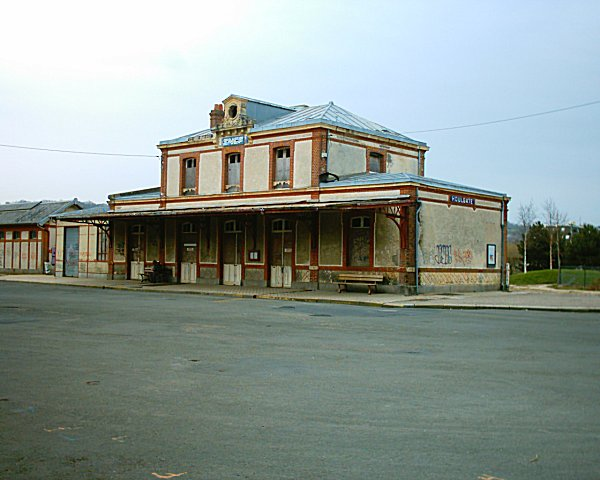
Houlgate station

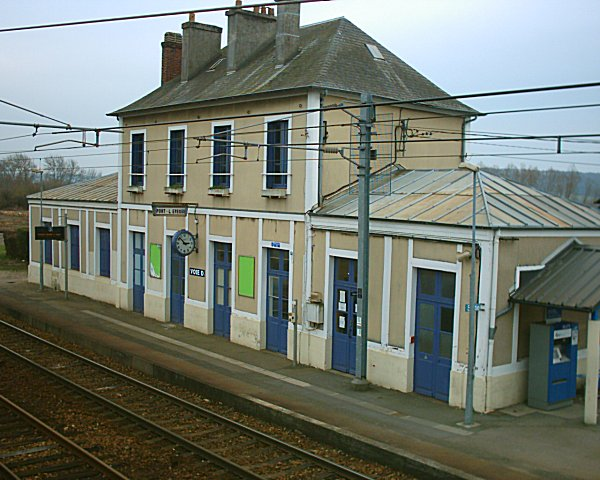
Pont L'Evèque station

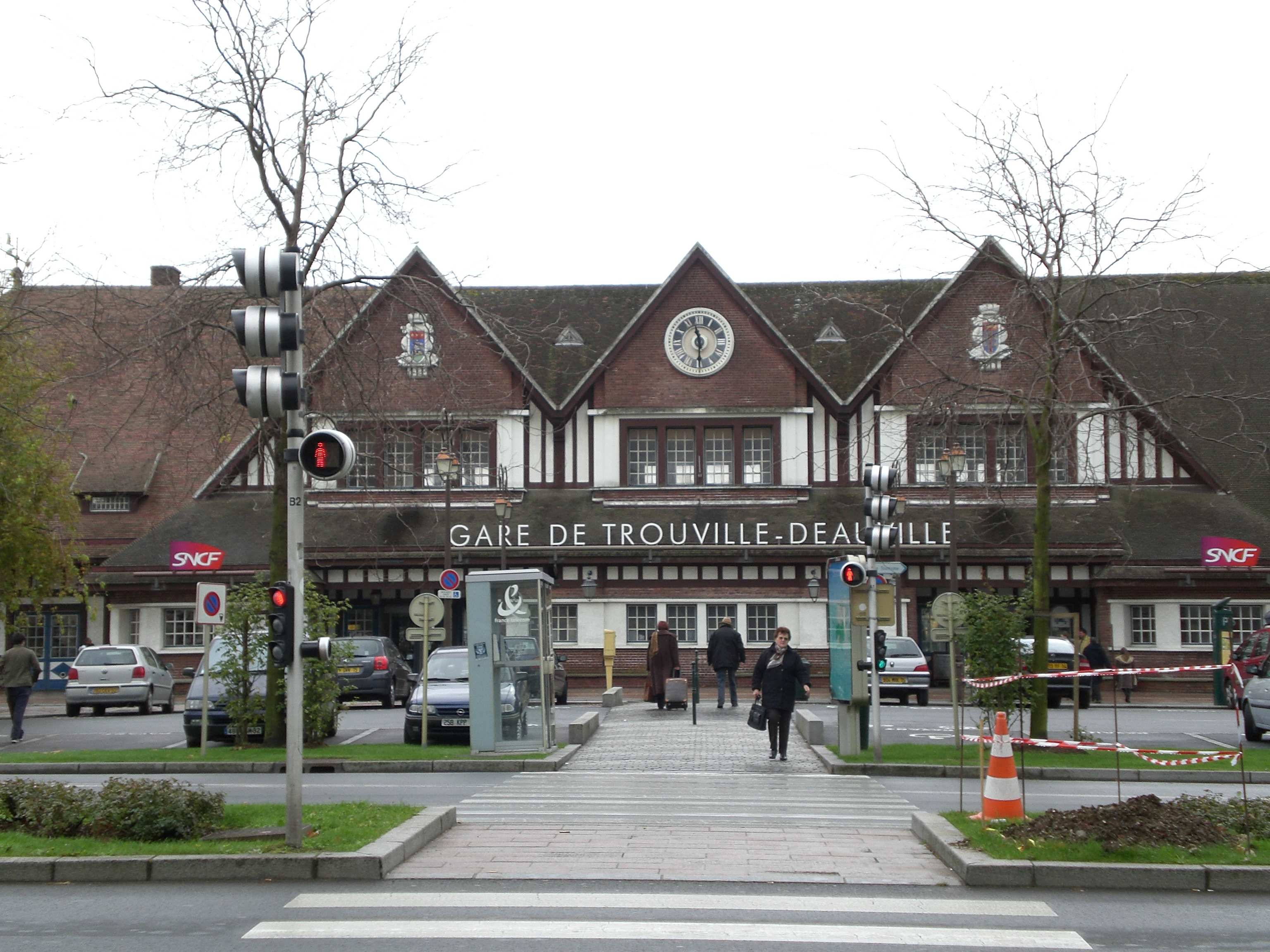
Trouville-Deauville station

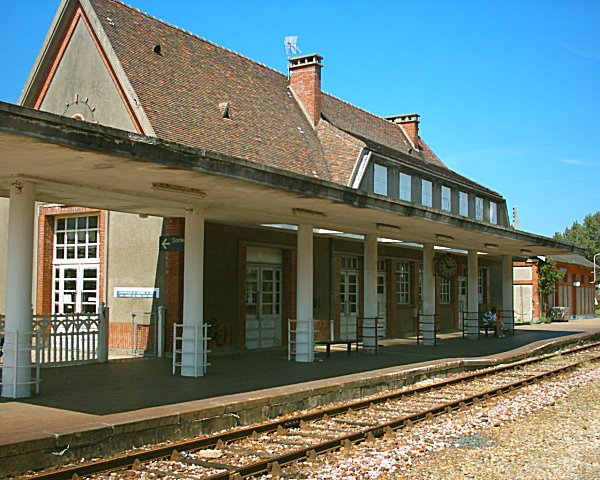
Villers-sur-Mer station

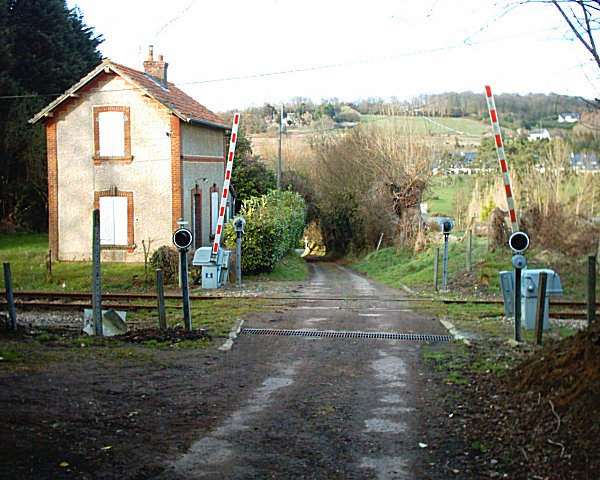
A typical Ouest level crossing guard house

== Locomotives ==
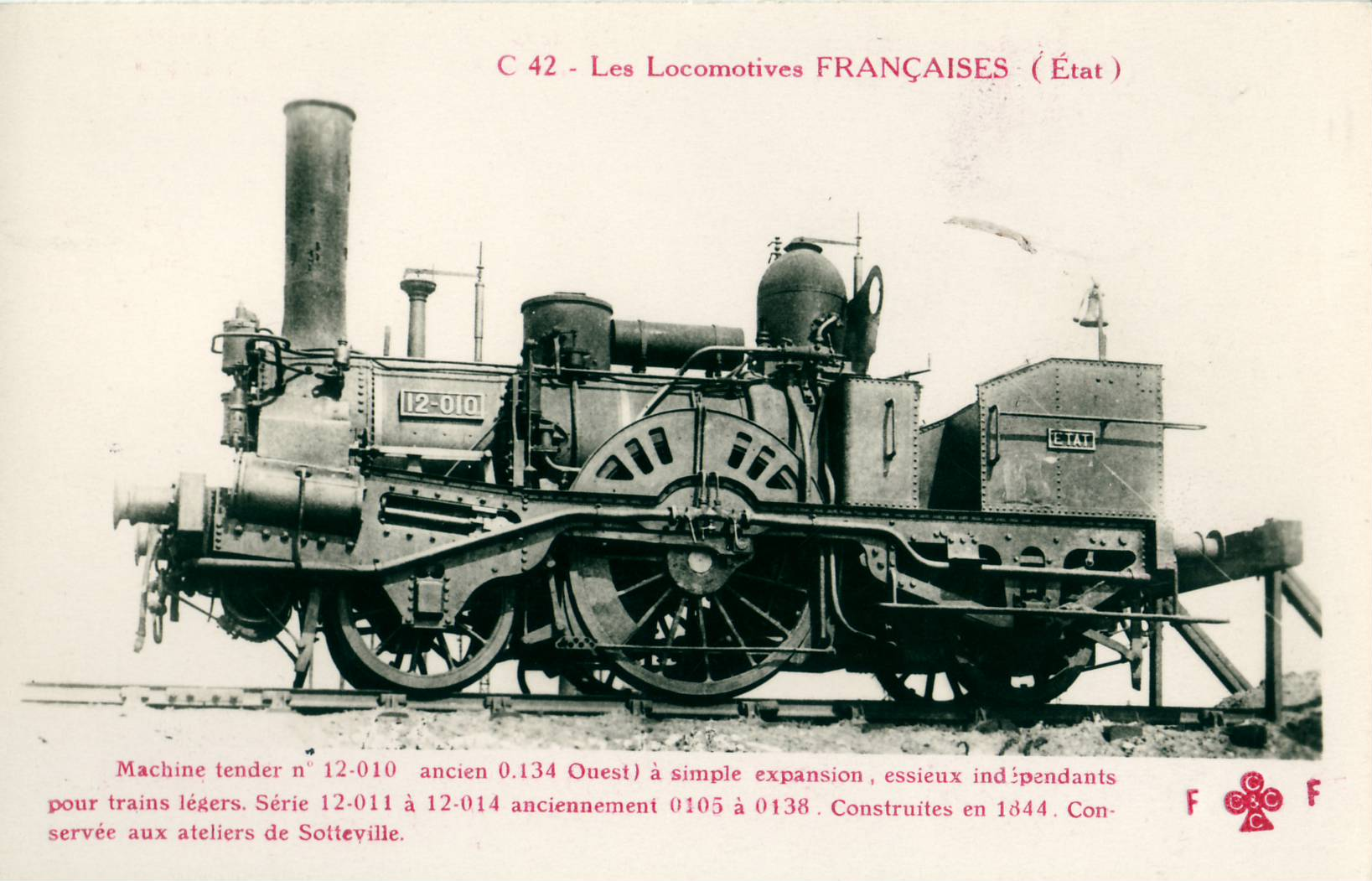
CF de l'État 2-2-2T No 12-010, formerly CF de l'Ouest No 0134. The locomotive was built in 1844.

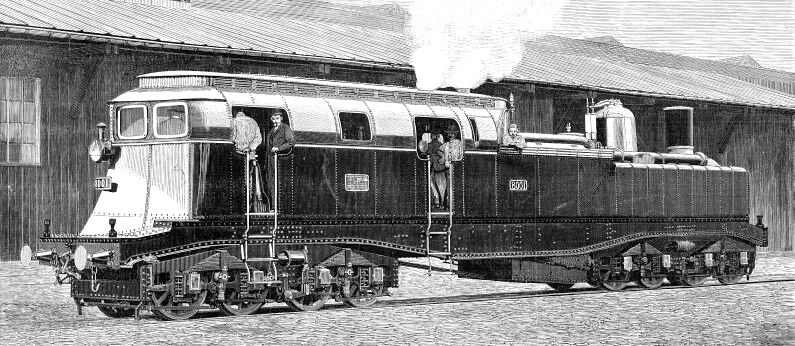
Heilmann locomotive No. 8001

=== Heilmann locomotives ===
In 1893, Jean Jacques Heilmann built a steam-electric locomotive of Do Do wheel arrangement, which was trialled on the CF de l'Ouest. Named La Fusée Electrique (English: The Electric Rocket), it was successful enough that two larger locomotives were constructed in 1897. These were numbered 8001 and 8002. Although considered successful, the design was not proceeded with and all three locomotives were dismantled.

== See also ==
- Val d'Or train station, station opened in 1903 by the Chemins de fer de l'Ouest.
