= Compagnie du Chemin de Fer d'Orléans à Rouen =

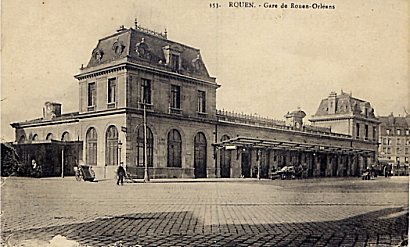
Rouen Orléans.

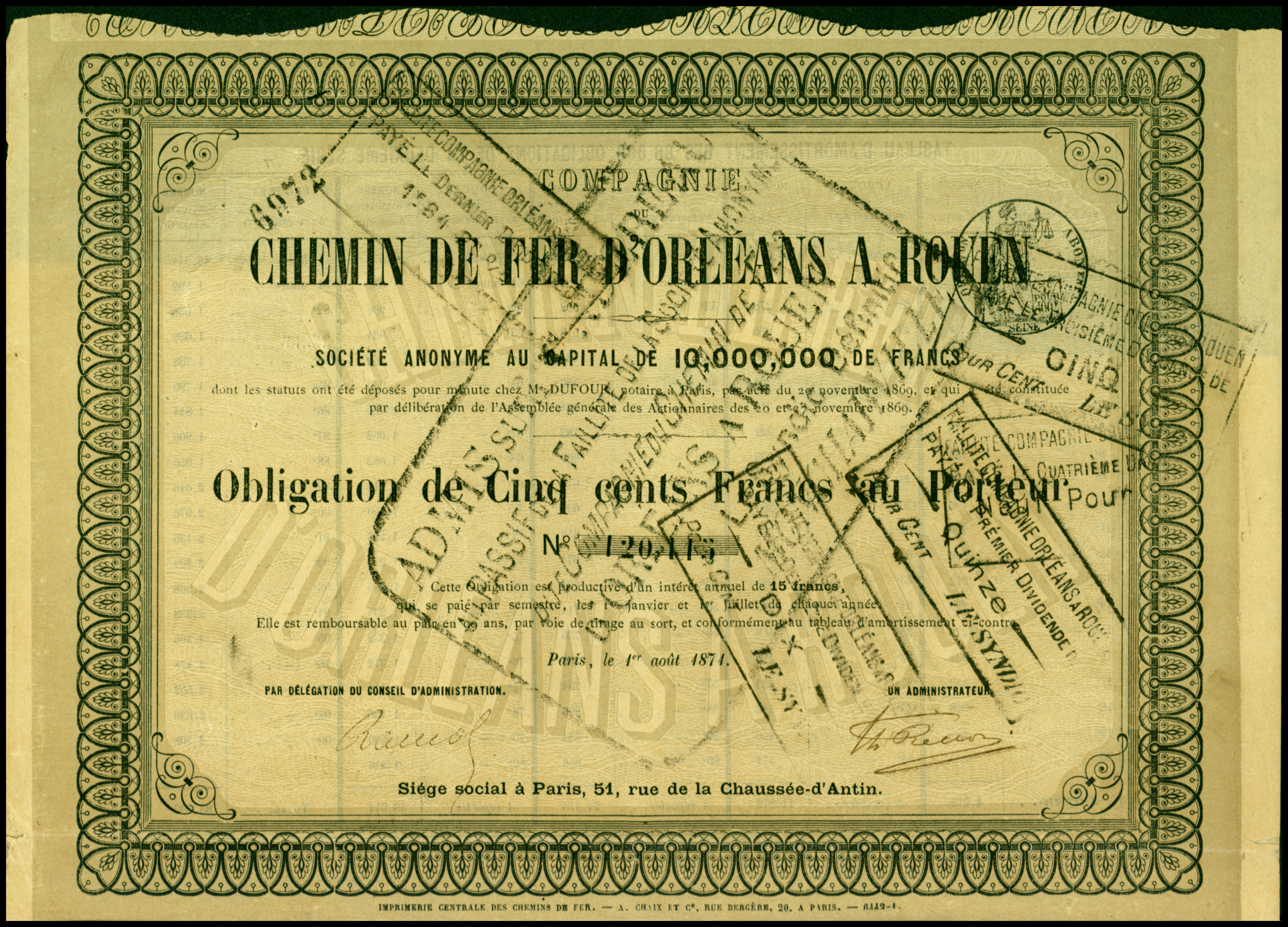
Bond of the Compagnie du Chemin de Fer d'Orléans à Rouen, issued 1. August 1871

The Compagnie du Chemin de Fer d'Orléans à Rouen (French pronunciation: [kɔ̃paɲi dy ʃəmɛ̃ də fɛʁ dɔʁleɑ̃ a ʁwɑ̃]) was a French railway company. The company was created in 1872 by M. Ridder, and subsequently absorbed by the Chemins de fer de l'Ouest in 1891.

A law permitted departmental councils to authorise the building of railways of local necessity, the Conseil Général de l'Eure authorised the line from Orléans to Rouen almost as soon as the law was passed.

Its story begins in 1878 when funds and property buying began as well as a quote for the Loiret-Voves section. Further bridge building took place at Chartres and several rivers such as over the Avre, Blaise and the Blairas between 1869 and 1873. The trackbeds were built at the same time as well as the station buildings and track.

The company was to use the PO station at Orléans, the Ouest station at Dreux.

The line as a whole closed in 1989 although several portions remain in use for passenger, freight or preserved rail.

== Line openings ==
Date	Section	Length (km)
14/02/1870	Rouen - Petit-Quevilly	3
10/05/1872	Evreux - Louviers	26
28/10/1872	Chartres - Orléans	75
01/05/1873	Vernon - Pacy-sur-Eure	19
02/08/1873	Chartres - Dreux	42
15/08/1875	Louviers - Caudebec-lès-Elbeuf	18
14/01/1876	Caudebec-lès-Elbeuf - Elbeuf	1

== Stations ==
- Orléans
- Patay
- Orgères
- Voves (junction with line from Toury)
- Chartres
- Dreux
- Saint Georges-Motel
- Croth
- Ivry-la-Bataille
- Bueil (on the line from Paris to Caen)
- Breuilpont
- Pacy-sur-Eure (junction with line from Vernon)
- Menilles
- Autheuil - Authouillet
- La Croix Saint Leufroy
  - Evreux
  - Gravigny
  - Brosville
  - Amfrville-sur-Iton
- Acquigny (junction with line from Evreux)
- Louviers
- La Haye Malherbe
- Elbeuf
- La Bouille-Moulineaux
- Grand Couronne
- Petit Couronne
- Grand Quevilly
- Petit Quevilly
- Rouen

== Rolling stock ==
=== Locomotives ===
- 101 to 107, État 2161 to 2167. Seven 2-4-0 locomotives built by Tubize between 1872 and 1875, they were similar in design of those of the CF de Lérouville-Sedan and Lille-Valenciennes. The engines were essentially used on the Chartres-Dreux, Chartres-Orléans and Chartres-Brou lines. They were withdrawn in 1892, and thus never received later État numbering. Their tender was subsequently used by locomotives 2601 to 2610 (later 121-051 to 121-059).
- 118 to 120, État 0205 to 0207. A class of three 0-4-0T locomotives, built by Tubize in 1872. They were used for shunting at stations and depots, including Château du Loir, Chartres and Courtalain. These engines were withdrawn in 1893, 1896 and 1907.
- Ouest 939 to 998, État 220-301 to 220-360. Not a CF d'Orléans-Rouen class of engines but used on Ouest and then État services from Rouen to Orléans.

=== Carriages ===
The Orléans-Rouen only possessed 44 coaches, all of which were transferred to the Etat at the time of the takeover in 1878.

- Buffet coaches. The Orléans-Rouen possessed one buffet coach, it had been built out of a mixed class coach and was extended by 5.5m and transformed into a saloon car.
- AB (Note: AB = Mixed first and second class) 346 to 358. Between 1872 and 1873, thirteen mixed first and second compartment coaches were built for the OR. (Note: CF d'Orléans à Rouen)
- ABC (Note: ABC = Mixed, first, second and third class) 534 to 539. This was a class of six mixed class carriages with a first class compartment, a second class compartment and two third class compartments.
- C (Note: C = Third class) 2706 to 2729. Twenty-four third class coaches with five compartments and access platforms were used by the OR. Some carriages were used up until 1934 by the Etat, especially between Pallet and Vallet. Two of the carriages were transformed into service coaches around 1903.
- Vans. The Orléans-Rouen possessed one postal van, numbered Cf 4527.

== Remaining lines ==
- Rouen - St Pierre les Elbeuf (preserved railway)
- Louviers - Acquigny
- La Croix St Lefroy - Bueil (preserved railway)
- Dreux - Chartres
- Chartres - Orléans
