= Ceinture 21 to 35 =

Ceinture 21 to 35 Nord 3.901 to 3.915 SNCF 2-030.TB
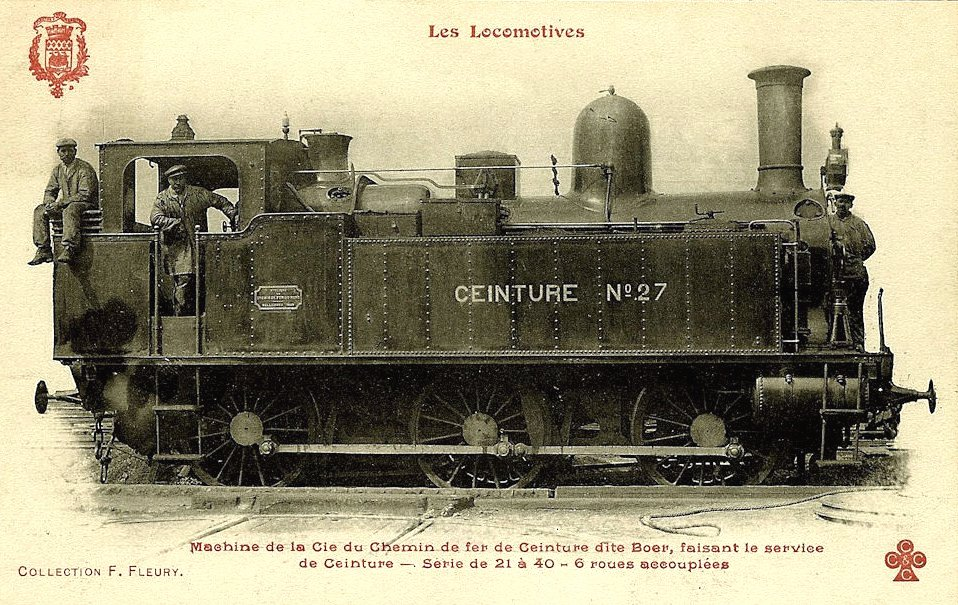
- Ceinture 27
Type and origin
- Power type: Steam
- Designer: Chemins de fer de l'Ouest
- Builder: Hellemmes Workshops (7); La Chapelle Workshops (8)
- Build date: 1899
- Total produced: 15
Specifications
- Configuration
  - Whyte: 0-6-0T
  - UIC: C n2t
- Gauge: 1,435 mm (4 ft 8 1/2 in)
- Driver dia.: 1,440 mm (4 ft 8 3/4 in)
- Loco weight: 44.00 tonnes (43.31 long tons; 48.50 short tons)
- Fuel type: Coal
- Fuel capacity: 1.2 tonnes (1.2 long tons; 1.3 short tons)
- Water cap.: 4,000 litres (880 imp gal; 1,100 US gal)
- Firebox
  - Type: Belpaire
  - Grate area: 1.63 m^{2} (17.5 sq ft)
- Boiler pressure: 12 kg/cm^{2} (1.18 MPa; 171 psi)
- Safety valve: Adams
- Heating surface: 114 m^{2} (1,230 sq ft)
- Cylinders: Two, inside
- Cylinder size: 430 mm × 600 mm (16 15/16 in × 23 5/8 in)
Performance figures
- Power output: 550 CV (400 kW; 540 hp)
Career
- Operators: Ceinture; Nord; SNCF
- Numbers: Ceinture: 21 – 35; Nord: 3.901 – 3.915; SNCF: 2-030.TB.1 – 2-030.TB.9
- Nicknames: Boers
- Scrapped: 1936–1953
- Disposition: All scrapped

Ceinture 21 to 35 were a class of fifteen French 0-6-0T locomotives of the Syndicat d'Exploitation des Chemins de fer de Ceinture de Paris. built in 1899 for pulling suburban passenger trains.

The locomotives were built in 1899 by the Chemins de fer du Nord's Hellemmes and La Chapelles Workshops based on the design of the Chemins de fer de l'Ouest's 3501 to 3602 series (later État 30–101 to 30-202).

The Nord made several changes: the use of a Belpaire firebox, higher boiler pressure (10 to 12 kg/cm^{2}, 981 to 1,180 kPa, 142 to 171 psi), Adams safety valves, smaller driving wheels (1,540 to 1,440 mm, 5 ft 5/8 in to 4 ft 8 3/4 in) and Nord-type sandboxes.

In 1934 at the dissolution of the Syndicat they passed to the Nord who renumbered them 3.901 to 3.915. Six were scrapped in 1936, leaving nine to pass to the SNCF at nationalisation in 1938. The SNCF renumbered them 2-030.TB.1 to 2–030.TB.9.

The remaining locomotives were scrapped between 1939 and 1953. None were preserved.

Table of scrapping
Year	Quantity in existence at start of year	Quantity scrapped	Locomotive numbers
1936	15	6	3.901, 3.902, 3.904 – 3.907
1939	9	1	030.TB.1
1944	8	1	030.TB.4
1945	7	1	030.TB.8
1948	6	2	030.TB.6, 9
1952	4	2	030.TB.3, 7
1953	2	2	030.TB.2, 5
