= Falaise station =

Railway station in Falaise, France

Coordinates: 48°53′47″N 0°11′34″W

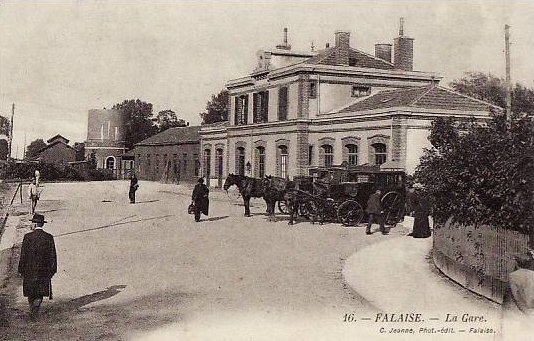
Falaise railway station in the early 20th century

Falaise was a railway station in the French town of Falaise, Calvados.

The station was built by the CF de l'Ouest in pure Ouest architecture, and opened on 1 November 1859. It saw the arrival of a line from Flers (Berjou-Pont-d'Ouilly) on 15 April 1874 and from Falaise-Château by the Calvados railway in 1904 (600 mm (1 ft 11 5/8 in)).

The main line to Caen closed on 1 July 1953 and the branch line from Berjou on 1 March 1938. at the birth of the SNCF. The narrow gauge line closed in 1932.

From 1954 to 1990 the station was used for Freight trains. The station was closed permanently in 1990.

The site of the former station was recently redeveloped and a supermarket built where the building once stood.
