= Rouen-Martainville station =

Railway station in Rouen, France

Coordinates: 49°26′18″N 1°6′54″E

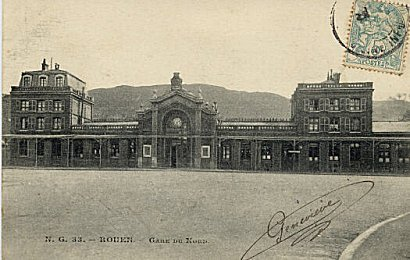
Rouen Martainville

Rouen Martainville or Gare du Nord was a large railway station serving the city of Rouen, in Normandy, northern France. The station was situated to the east of the city's centre.

The station was built by Chemin de Fer du Nord and opened on 18 April 1867 and linked Rouen to Amiens and Lille. The station closed in the 1930s and its traffic rerouted to Rue Verte, the station building was demolished in 1980 to make space for redevelopment. The station remained as a goods yard. A short freight line runs from the side of the station to Rouen's docks.

== See also ==
- Rouen Rue Verte
- Rouen Saint-Sever
- Rouen Orléans
