= Coulvain =

- Part of Seulline
- Location of Coulvain
- Location within France Location within Normandy
- Coordinates: 49°02′56″N 0°43′31″W
- Country: France
- Region: Normandy
- Department: Calvados
- Arrondissement: Vire
- Canton: Les Monts d'Aunay
- Commune: Seulline
- Area^{1}: 4.31 km^{2} (1.66 sq mi)
- Elevation: 238 m (781 ft)
- Highest elevation: 222 m (728 ft)
- Lowest elevation: 128 m (420 ft)
- Population (2023): 391
  - Density: 90.7/km^{2} (235/sq mi)
- Time zone: UTC+01:00 (CET)
  - Summer (DST): UTC+02:00 (CEST)
- Postal code: 14310
- ^{1} French Land Register data, which excludes lakes, ponds, glaciers > 1 km^{2} (0.386 sq mi or 247 acres) and river estuaries.

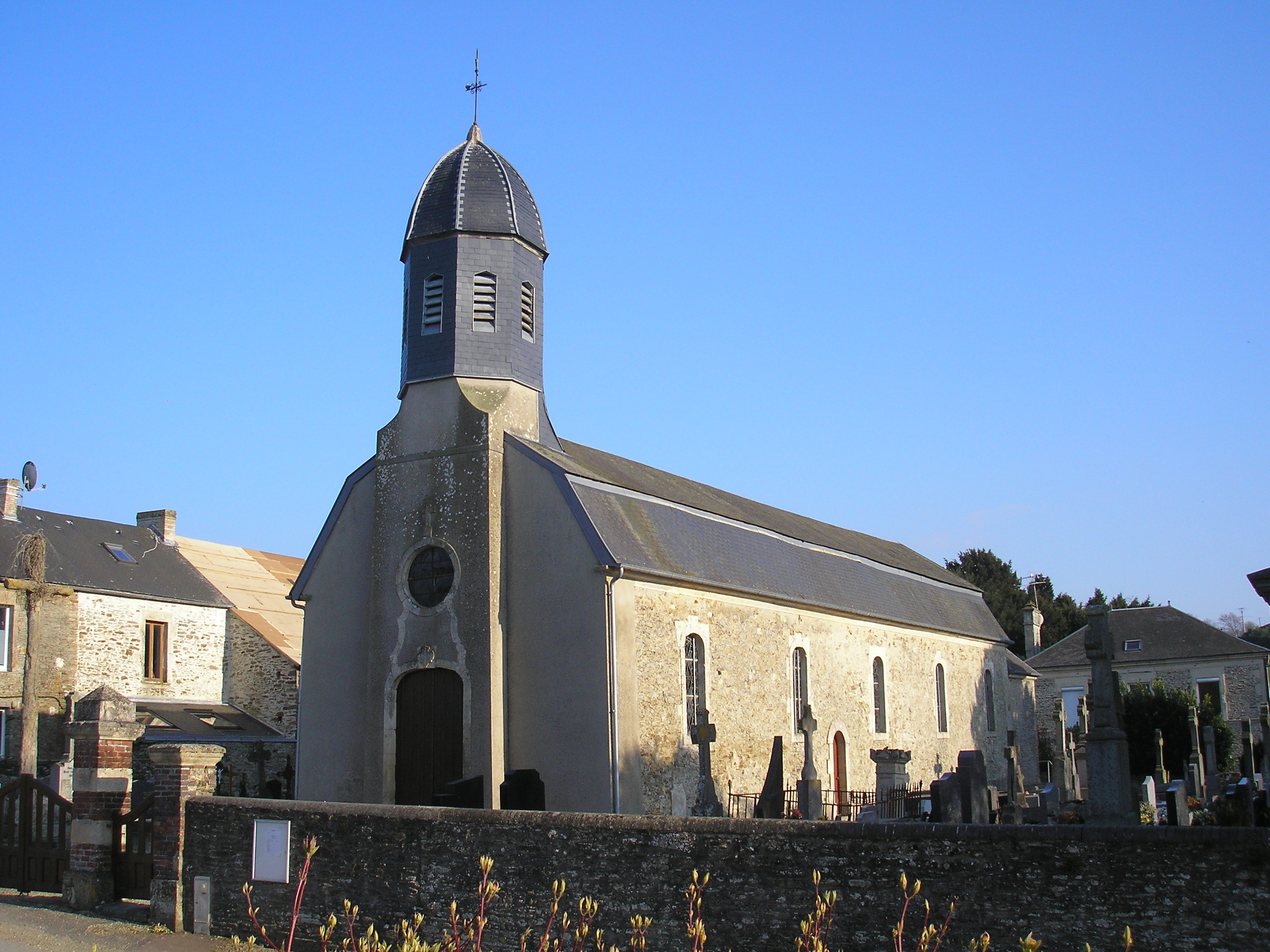
France Normandie Coulvain Eglise

Coulvain (French pronunciation: [kulvɛ̃]) is a former commune in the Calvados department in the Normandy region in northwestern France. On 1 January 2016, it was merged into the new commune of Seulline.

== See also ==
- Communes of the Calvados department
