= Honfleur station =

Former railway station in Honfleur, France

Coordinates: 49.417°N 0.241°E

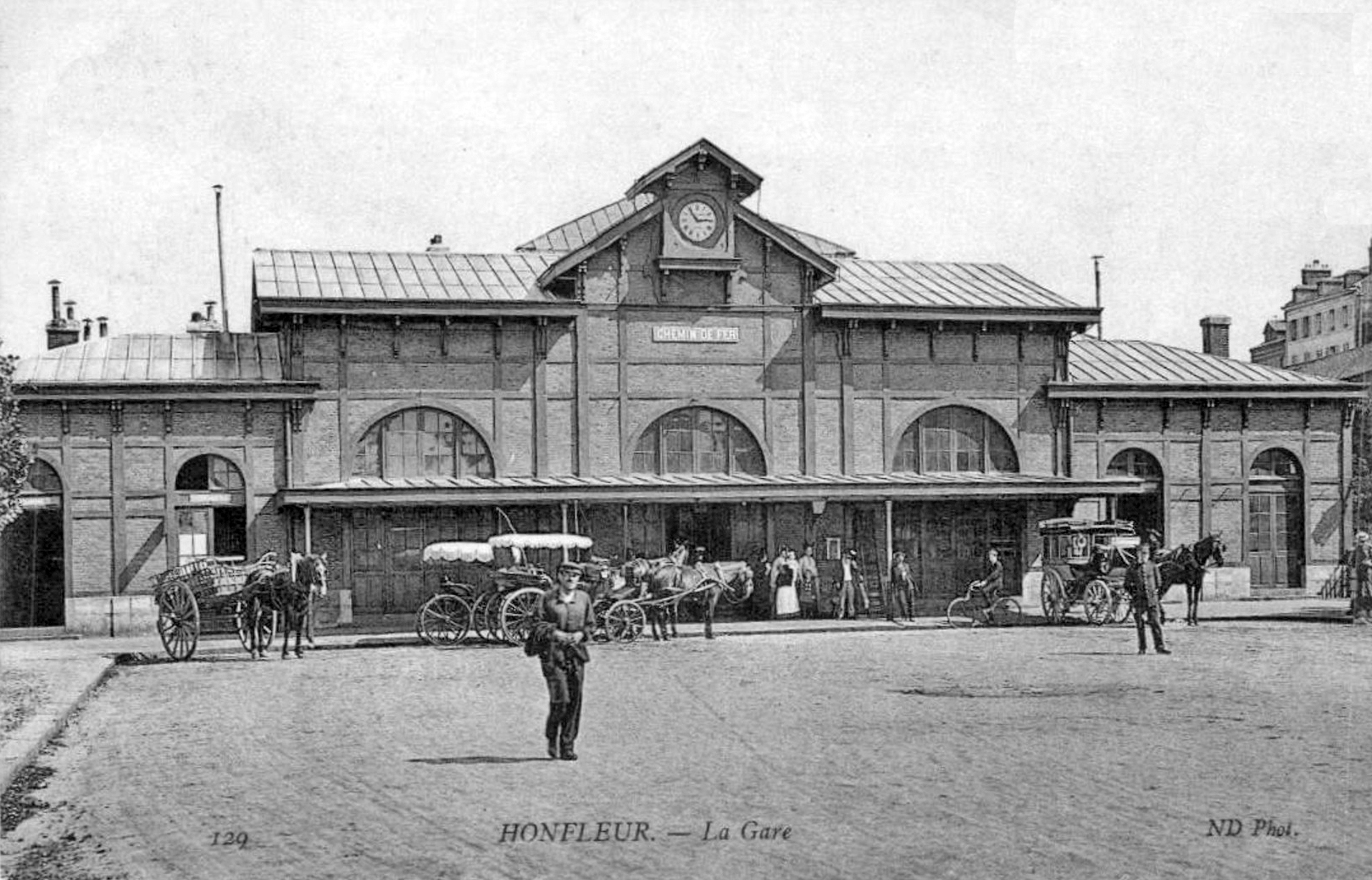
The station circa 1900.

Honfleur station was the railway station for the town of Honfleur, Calvados, in Lower Normandy. The station was the terminus for two railway lines, the main line from Paris via Brionne and the branch line from Paris via Pont-l'Évêque.

The CF de l'Ouest company built the line from Pont-l'Évêque and opened it on 7 July 1862, the main line from Paris opened 8 August 1889. The station closed in 1977 and the line to the station cut off a few hundred metres at the junction with the dock yard. A new goods yard of 8 tracks was built and is now below the Pont de Normandie.
