= Saint-Pierre-lès-Elbeuf =

- Commune
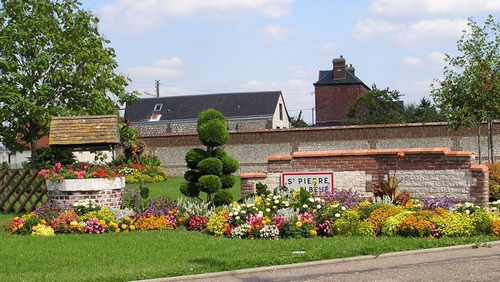
- A floral display at the entrance to Saint-Pierre-lès-Elbeuf

- Coat of arms
- Location of Saint-Pierre-lès-Elbeuf
- Location within France Location within Normandy
- Coordinates: 49°16′41″N 1°02′29″E
- Country: France
- Region: Normandy
- Department: Seine-Maritime
- Arrondissement: Rouen
- Canton: Caudebec-lès-Elbeuf
- Intercommunality: Métropole Rouen Normandie

Government
  - Mayor (2020–2026): Nadia Mezrar
- Area^{1}: 6.36 km^{2} (2.46 sq mi)
- Elevation: 20 m (66 ft)
- Highest elevation: 75 m (246 ft)
- Lowest elevation: 4 m (13 ft)
- Population (2023): 8,306
  - Density: 1,310/km^{2} (3,380/sq mi)
- Time zone: UTC+01:00 (CET)
  - Summer (DST): UTC+02:00 (CEST)
- INSEE/Postal code: 76640 /76320
- ^{1} French Land Register data, which excludes lakes, ponds, glaciers > 1 km^{2} (0.386 sq mi or 247 acres) and river estuaries.

Saint-Pierre-lès-Elbeuf (French pronunciation: [sɛ̃ pjɛʁ lɛ.z‿ɛlbœf], literally Saint-Pierre near Elbeuf) is a commune in the Seine-Maritime department in the Normandy region in northern France.

== Geography ==
A small suburb town of farming and light industry situated by the banks of the Seine, some 14 miles (23 km) south of Rouen at the junction of the D921 with the D321 and the D913 with the D86 road. The old quarries have some interesting geological strata examples.

== Population ==
Historical population
Year	Pop.	±% p.a.
1968	4,456	—
1975	6,449	+5.42%
1982	7,994	+3.12%
1990	8,411	+0.64%
1999	8,417	+0.01%
2007	8,332	−0.13%
2012	8,338	+0.01%
2017	8,202	−0.33%
2023	8,306	+0.21%
Source: INSEE

== Main sights ==
- The church of St.Pierre, dating from the 19th century.
- The church of St.Louis, also dating from the 19th century.
- The 18th-century château du Parc.

== Twin towns ==
- Rieti, Italy

== See also ==
- Communes of the Seine-Maritime department
