= Canton of Caudebec-lès-Elbeuf =

Coordinates: 49°18′18″N 1°04′03″E

Caudebec-lès-Elbeuf
- Canton
- Country: France
- Region: Normandy
- Department: Seine-Maritime
- No. of communes: {{{nbcomm}}}
- Area: 38.75 km^{2} (14.96 sq mi)
- Population (2023): 36,421
  - Density: 939.9/km^{2} (2,434/sq mi)
- INSEE code: 76 05

The Canton of Caudebec-lès-Elbeuf is a canton situated in the Seine-Maritime département in the Normandy region of northern France.

== Geography ==
The area is noted for motorcar manufacturing, farming, forestry and light industry in the arrondissement of Rouen, centred on the town of Caudebec-lès-Elbeuf.

== Composition ==
At the French canton reorganisation which came into effect in March 2015, the canton was expanded from 6 to 7 communes:

- Caudebec-lès-Elbeuf
- Cléon
- Freneuse
- Saint-Aubin-lès-Elbeuf
- Saint-Pierre-lès-Elbeuf
- Sotteville-sous-le-Val
- Tourville-la-Rivière

== Population ==
Historical population
| Year | Pop. | ±% p.a. |
|---|---|---|
| 2013 | 35,940 | — |
| 2018 | 35,910 | −0.02% |
Source: INSEE

== See also ==
- Arrondissements of the Seine-Maritime department
- Cantons of the Seine-Maritime department
- Communes of the Seine-Maritime department
