= Tourville-la-Rivière =

- Commune
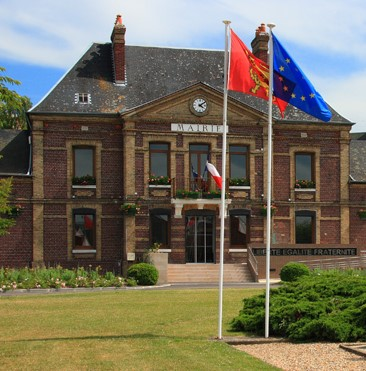
- The town hall in Tourville-la-Rivière

- Coat of arms
- Location of Tourville-la-Rivière
- Location within France Location within Normandy
- Coordinates: 49°19′44″N 1°06′22″E
- Country: France
- Region: Normandy
- Department: Seine-Maritime
- Arrondissement: Rouen
- Canton: Caudebec-lès-Elbeuf
- Intercommunality: Métropole Rouen Normandie

Government
  - Mayor (2026–32): Agnès Cercel
- Area^{1}: 8 km^{2} (3.1 sq mi)
- Elevation: 11 m (36 ft)
- Highest elevation: 82 m (269 ft)
- Lowest elevation: 2 m (6.6 ft)
- Population (2023): 2,596
  - Density: 320/km^{2} (840/sq mi)
- Time zone: UTC+01:00 (CET)
  - Summer (DST): UTC+02:00 (CEST)
- INSEE/Postal code: 76705 /76410
- ^{1} French Land Register data, which excludes lakes, ponds, glaciers > 1 km^{2} (0.386 sq mi or 247 acres) and river estuaries.

Tourville-la-Rivière (French pronunciation: [tuʁvil la ʁivjɛʁ]) is a commune in the Seine-Maritime department in the Normandy region in northern France.

== Geography ==
A small farming and light industrial town situated by the banks of the Seine, some 9 miles (14 km) south of Rouen at the junction of the D144, D7 and the D13 roads.
Junction 21 of the A13 autoroute is within the commune's borders. SNCF operates a TER rail service to the town. A huge new shopping centre was opened here in 2006.

== Heraldry ==
Arms of Tourville-la-Rivière	The arms of the commune of Tourville-la-Rivière are blazoned : Bendy argent and azure, a crowned lion gules between 3 escallops Or.

== Population ==
Historical population
Year	Pop.	±% p.a.
1968	1,102	—
1975	1,419	+3.68%
1982	1,828	+3.68%
1990	1,886	+0.39%
1999	2,280	+2.13%
2007	2,287	+0.04%
2012	2,474	+1.58%
2017	2,501	+0.22%
2023	2,596	+0.62%
Source: INSEE

== Places of interest ==
- The shopping centre.
- The church of St. Martin, dating from the sixteenth century.
- The seventeenth-century chateau of Tourville at Bédane, with a dovecote built in 1691 and a 15th-century chapel.
- A seventeenth-century stone cross.
- A Roman necropolis of 150 to 200 tombs with pottery and coins all discovered during the building of the SNCF railway.

== See also ==
- Communes of the Seine-Maritime department
