= Rouen Orléans station =

Railway station in Rouen, France

Coordinates: 49°26′6″N 1°5′18″E

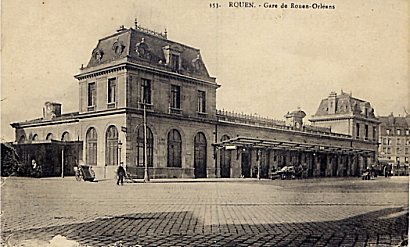
- Rouen Orléans

General information
- Location: France
Location

Rouen Orléans was a large railway station-serving the city of Rouen, Normandy, northern France, built by the CF d'Orléans à Rouen. The station was situated along the quais of the river Seine to the south of city's centre.

The station opened on 7 January 1883 when the line from Orléans to Rouen opened to service. The station building was replaced by a new construction built by Juste Lisch. It was destroyed in 1944 by the Allied bombardments and was not reopened to passenger traffic. The goods yard of the same name which replaced the station was moved to the west.

The Archive Tower of the Seine-Maritime general council, built in 1965, now stands on the site of the former station.

== See also ==
- Rouen-Martainville
- Rouen Rue-Verte
- Rouen Saint-Sever
