= Seulline =

- Commune
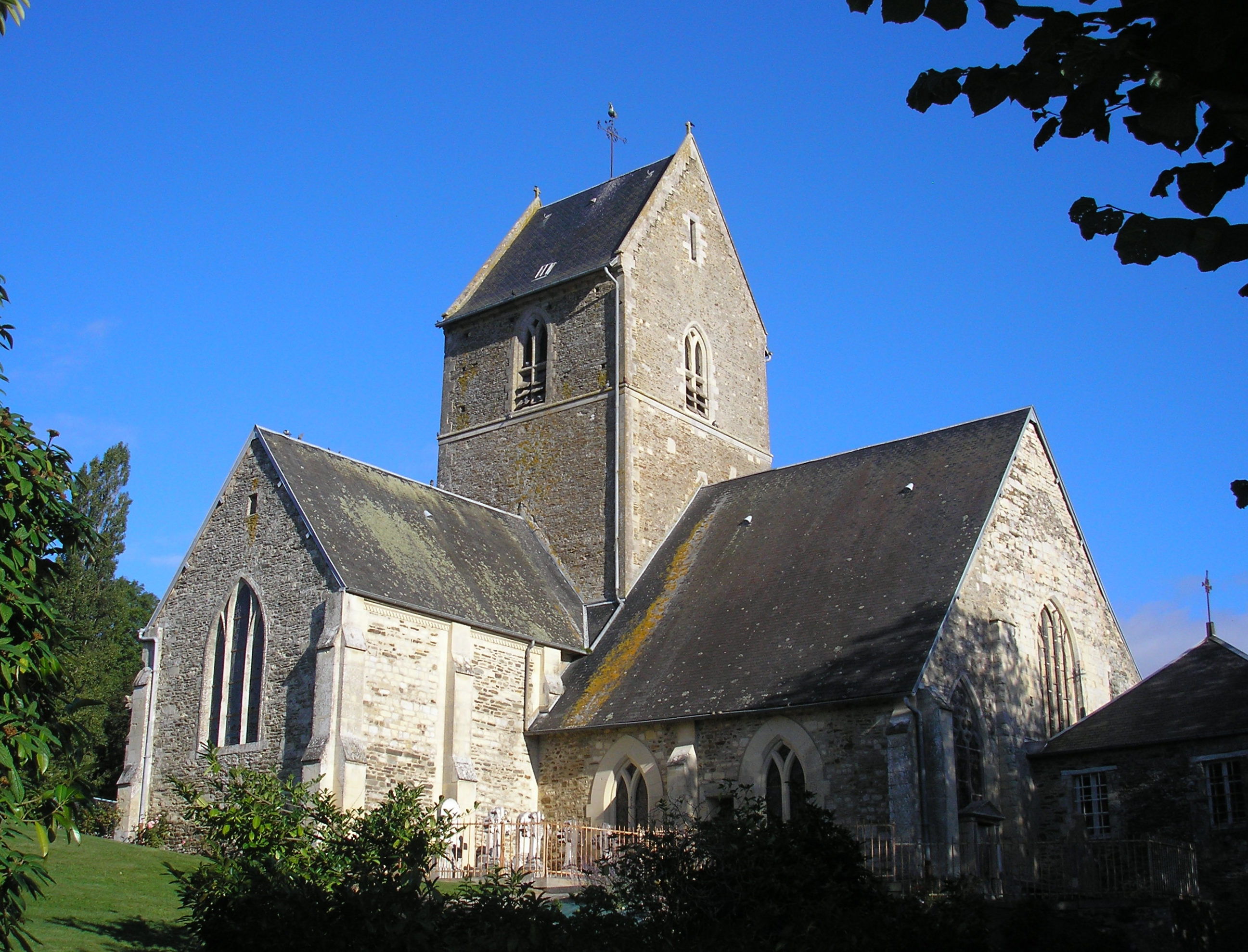
- The church in Saint-Georges-d'Aunay
- Location of Seulline
- Location within France Location within Normandy
- Coordinates: 49°02′13″N 0°40′48″W
- Country: France
- Region: Normandy
- Department: Calvados
- Arrondissement: Vire
- Canton: Les Monts d'Aunay
- Intercommunality: Pré-Bocage Intercom

Government
  - Mayor (2021–2026): Sylvain Varenne
- Area^{1}: 31.67 km^{2} (12.23 sq mi)
- Population (2023): 1,312
  - Density: 41.43/km^{2} (107.3/sq mi)
- Time zone: UTC+01:00 (CET)
  - Summer (DST): UTC+02:00 (CEST)
- INSEE/Postal code: 14579 /14260, 14310
- ^{1} French Land Register data, which excludes lakes, ponds, glaciers > 1 km^{2} (0.386 sq mi or 247 acres) and river estuaries.

Seulline (French pronunciation: [sœlin]) is a commune in the department of Calvados, northwestern France. The municipality was established on 1 January 2016 by merger of the former communes of Saint-Georges-d'Aunay and Coulvain. On 1 January 2017, the former commune of La Bigne was merged into Seulline.

== Geography ==
The commune is made up of the following collection of villages and hamlets, La Blanche Maison, Coulvain, Seulline, La Roserie, Quévrus, Laumont and Le Vigeon.

Two rivers the Odon and La Seulline flow through the commune.

== See also ==
- Communes of the Calvados department
