= Freneuse, Seine-Maritime =

Freneuse
- Commune
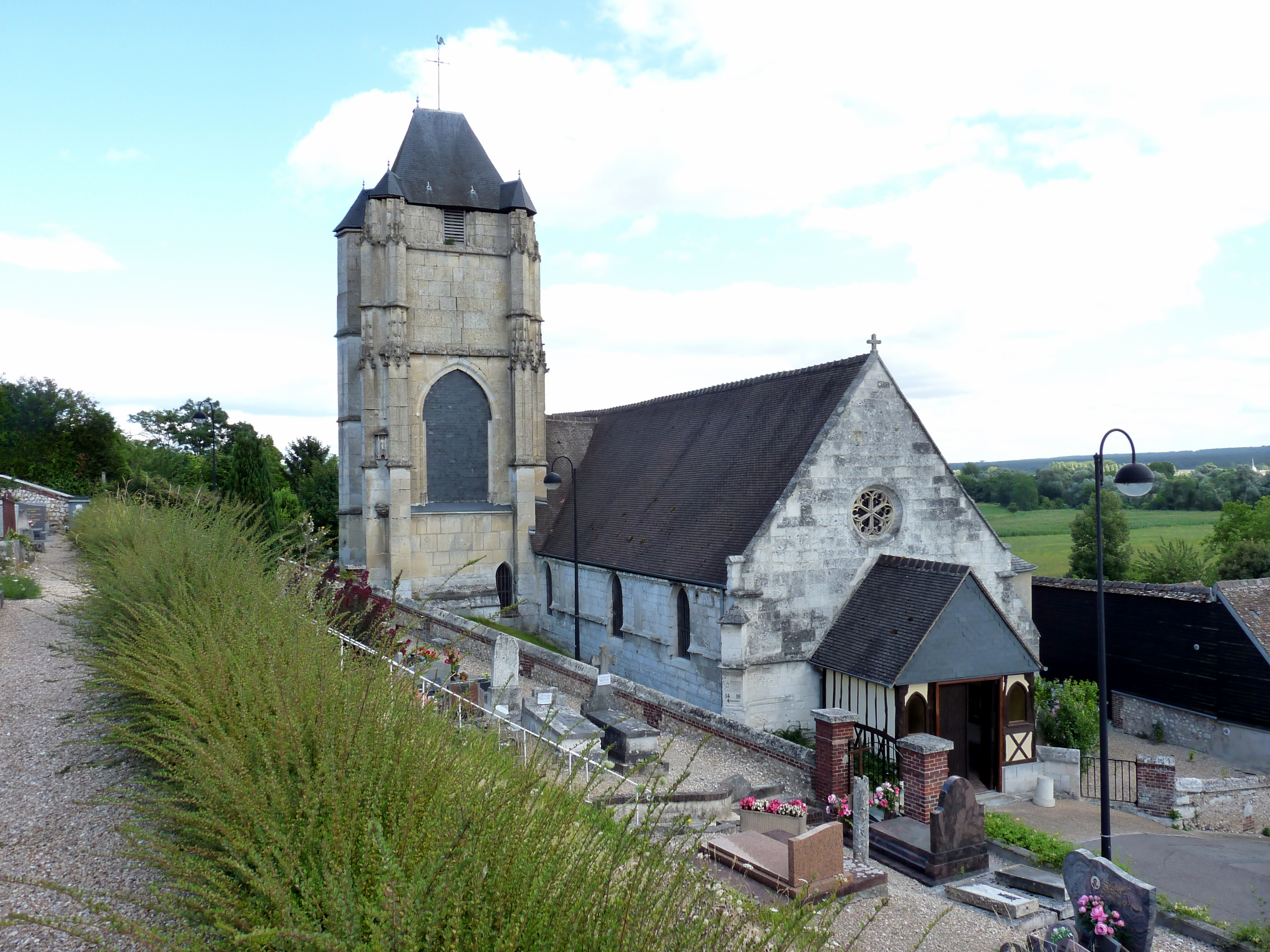
- The church in Freneuse
- Location of Freneuse
- Location within France Location within Normandy
- Coordinates: 49°18′32″N 1°03′51″E
- Country: France
- Region: Normandy
- Department: Seine-Maritime
- Arrondissement: Rouen
- Canton: Caudebec-lès-Elbeuf
- Intercommunality: Métropole Rouen Normandie

Government
  - Mayor (2026–32): Pascal Baron
- Area^{1}: 3.18 km^{2} (1.23 sq mi)
- Elevation: 11 m (36 ft)
- Highest elevation: 75 m (246 ft)
- Lowest elevation: 3 m (9.8 ft)
- Population (2023): 993
  - Density: 312/km^{2} (809/sq mi)
- Time zone: UTC+01:00 (CET)
  - Summer (DST): UTC+02:00 (CEST)
- INSEE/Postal code: 76282 /76410
- ^{1} French Land Register data, which excludes lakes, ponds, glaciers > 1 km^{2} (0.386 sq mi or 247 acres) and river estuaries.

Freneuse (French pronunciation: [fʁənøz]) is a commune in the Seine-Maritime department in the Normandy region in northern France.

== Geography ==
A farming village situated in a meander of the river Seine some 8 miles (13 km) south of the centre of Rouen, at the junction of the D92 and the D292 roads.

== Population ==
Historical population
Year	Pop.	±% p.a.
1968	575	—
1975	730	+3.47%
1982	1,024	+4.95%
1990	1,033	+0.11%
1999	951	−0.91%
2007	936	−0.20%
2012	910	−0.56%
2017	932	+0.48%
2023	993	+1.06%
Source: INSEE

== Places of interest ==
- The church of Notre-Dame, dating from the sixteenth century.
- The chateau at the hamlet of Beaudoin.
- The seventeenth-century chateau du Val-Freneuse

== See also ==
- Communes of the Seine-Maritime department
