= La Bigne =

- Part of Seulline
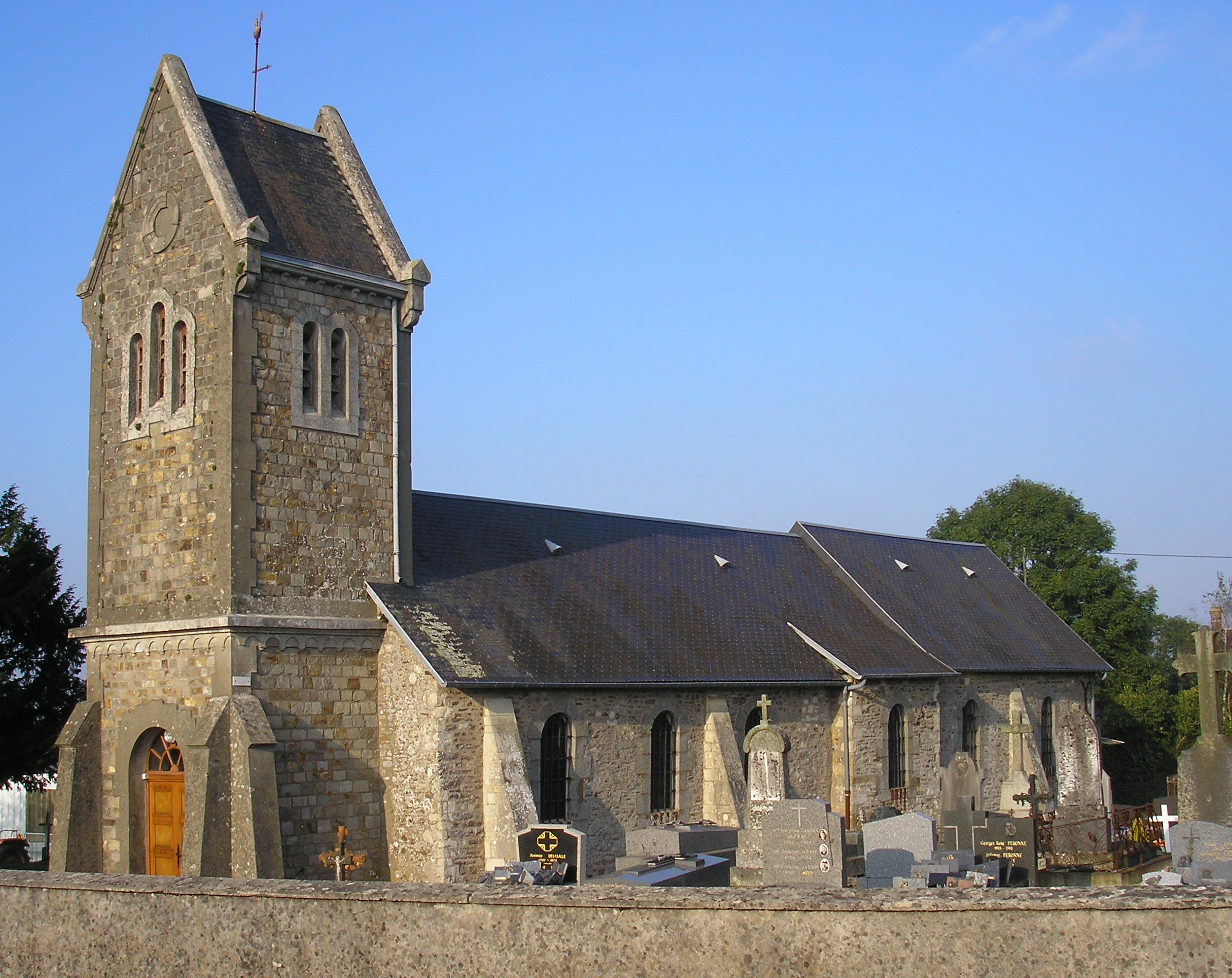
- Saint-Marcouf church
- Location of La Bigne
- Location within France Location within Normandy
- Coordinates: 49°00′43″N 0°43′14″W
- Country: France
- Region: Normandy
- Department: Calvados
- Arrondissement: Vire
- Canton: Les Monts d'Aunay
- Commune: Seulline
- Area^{1}: 3.85 km^{2} (1.49 sq mi)
- Elevation: 240 m (790 ft)
- Highest elevation: 266 m (873 ft)
- Lowest elevation: 152 m (499 ft)
- Population (2023): 213
  - Density: 55.3/km^{2} (143/sq mi)
- Time zone: UTC+01:00 (CET)
  - Summer (DST): UTC+02:00 (CEST)
- Postal code: 14260
- ^{1} French Land Register data, which excludes lakes, ponds, glaciers > 1 km^{2} (0.386 sq mi or 247 acres) and river estuaries.

La Bigne (French pronunciation: [la biɲ]) is a former commune in the Calvados department in the Normandy region in northwestern France. On 1 January 2017, it was merged into the commune Seulline.

== See also ==
- Communes of the Calvados department
