= Paris–Normandy new line =

Future French high-speed railway

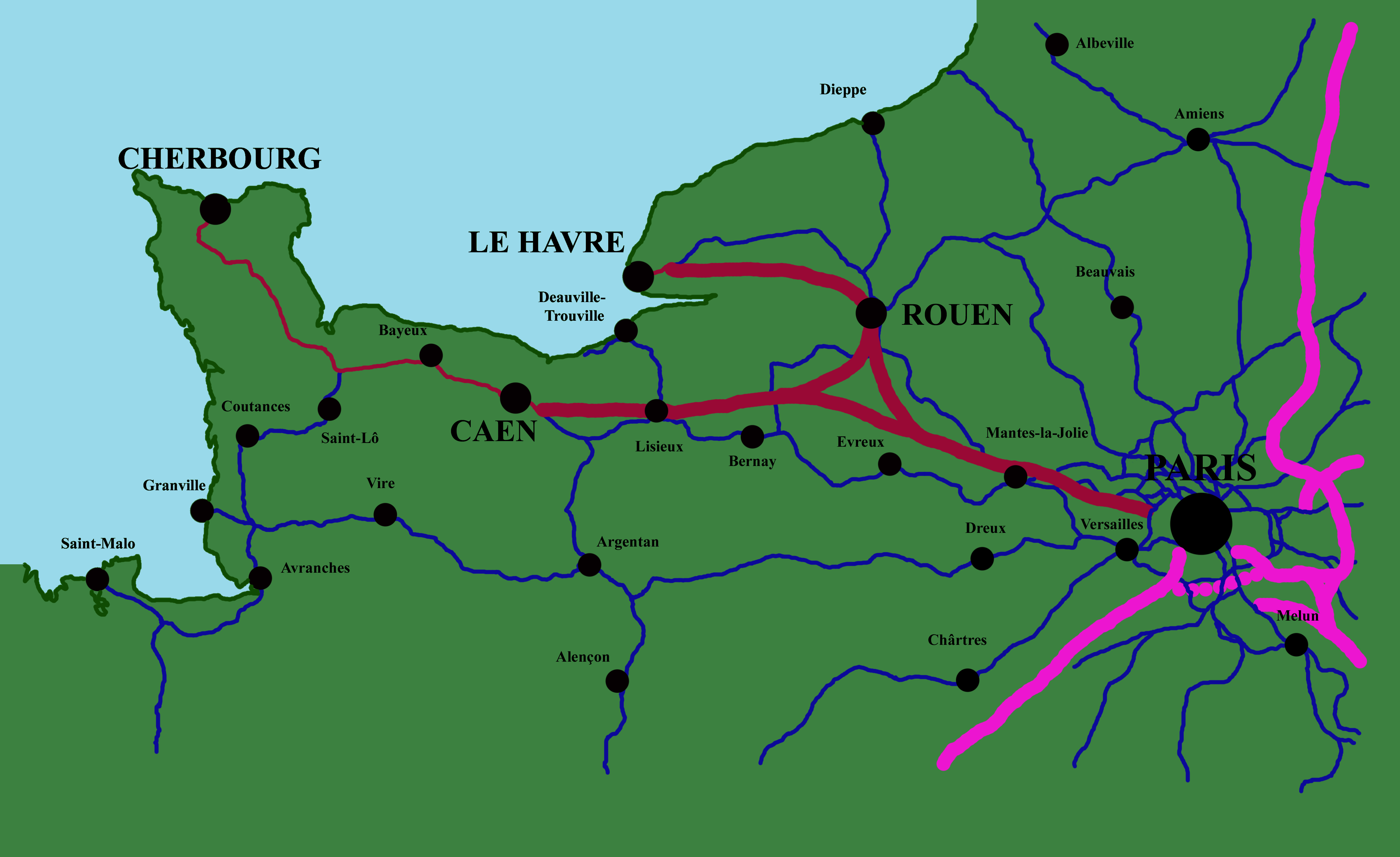
An outdated map of the project

The Ligne nouvelle Paris - Normandie (LNPN; English: "Paris – Normandy new line"), also known as the LGV Normandie (French: LGV for ligne à grande vitesse), is a planned French high-speed rail line project to link Paris and Normandy. Trains will run at 250 km/h (155 mph) with a new TGV station serving Rouen. The alignment was effectively abandoned in June 2025, though is claimed to remain a project of national interest.

== Background ==
The 1991 diagram of the proposed LGV network already included the LGV Normandie. This was to begin in the Parisian far suburbs (near Achères) and would split into two branches near Mantes-la-Jolie; one leading towards Rouen, the other ending near Évreux. This project was abandoned due to profitability concerns (the cost of replacing the then Corails with TGVs would be high, whereas the time gain would be modest). The Basse-Normandie and Haute-Normandie regions would therefore have to content themselves with a more basic project improving the infrastructure of the "classic" line.

In 2009, the idea was reactivated with the Grand Paris: for some policy-makers, this line would better connect Paris to its "natural port", Le Havre, but still a "classic" TGV line wouldn't be appropriate enough. However, studies and the public debate showed that a new line was needed, especially to replace the current Paris - Mantes-la-Jolie line, which can't take more trains. The current Rouen-Rive-Droite station was already at the time deemed too small to appropriately receive all trains with only six tracks.

== History ==
Studies were funded with realization not expected before 2035. Plans included the following:

Trains from and towards Normandy will still begin and terminate at the current Paris Saint-Lazare station, which would be somewhat modernized. A station serving La Défense was studied but ultimately abandoned in 2016, notably because the station couldn't be actually close to La Défense.

The new line would formally begin in the Parisian suburb of Nanterre, west of the current La Garenne-Colombe station. In order to not destroy numerous habitations in the suburbs, it is planned to build the line with a 20 km-long tunnel, passing two times under the Seine river and emerging west of current Poissy station. From then, it would be laid on surface, closely following the A13 motorway, to join existing tracks in the current Mantes-la-Jolie station. The maximal speed of this new line would be 200 km/h. The existing line would be used by the RER E commuter rail service and freight trains towards Le Havre.

In Rouen, the current station (Rouen-Rive-Droite) is too small and is impossible to extend because it is located between two tunnels and in a very dense sector. In addition to Paris - Rouen - Le Havre Intercity trains, the station also have to receive regional trains from Amiens and Caen and local trains. Thus, a new station would be constructed on the left blank of the Seine river, on a decommissioned industrial site called Saint-Sever. This new station would be the terminus of all regional trains, ensuring easy connections. The current station would still be open. Trains towards Le Havre would call in this new station before taking a new line, joining the historical line towards before Barentin; this line would include a 8 km-long tunnel in part under the Seine river.

As 2024, the two aforementioned sections (Paris - Mantes and Rouen - Barentin) are the only ones studied. Further plans include news lines between Mantes-la-Jolie and Évreux and a section between Barentin and Yvetot, in order to accelerate trains towards Le Havre and Caen. Tracks's curves would be compatible with a maximal speed of 250 km/h.

In the long-term, it is suggested to create a high-speed line in the Eure department in a Y-shape form, between Évreux, Bernay, and Rouen. With a maximal speed of 250 km/h, it would further accelerate trains between Normandy and Paris but, crucially, would better link by rail Caen and Rouen, the two main cities of the region.

In September 2024, the regional council of Île-de-France adopted a motion opposing the line, citing concerns over disruption to local residents, high costs, ecological damage, and little benefit for the region’s citizens. In June 2025, the proposed route was officially rejected, with the line being excluded from the Île-de-France region’s infrastructure masterplan through to 2040, approved by the Council of State.

The decision was met with disappointment by public officials in Normandy. On 1 July 2025, a steering committee met, bringing together the mayors of Caen, Le Havre, and Rouen, along with Île-de-France regional president, Valérie Pécresse, and other public officials. While claiming to not be opposed to the line, Pécresse raised concerns, including the loss of farmland, the absence of stops within Île-de-France, and her opposition to the inclusion of freight traffic on the line, instead calling for new route studies.

Despite regional objections, the Minister of Transport, Philippe Tabarot, reaffirmed the government's support, describing the rail line as a "project of national interest".

== Connected projects ==
- The LGV Picardie would link Normandy and the North of France, Brussels, Picardy and the eastern French region
