= Porchefontaine =

Coordinates: 48°47′43″N 2°09′21″E

Porchefontaine is a neighborhood in the south-east of Versailles, in Yvelines department of France.

It was a living working class residential area. Since the 1970s, the neighborhood declined in activity and population.

It features a tiny downtown, two schools, a sports complex, a camping, and a green space that is surrounded by the Versailles, Satory, and Meudon woods.

The neighborhood has a small station served by the RER C.
