= Berjou =

- Commune
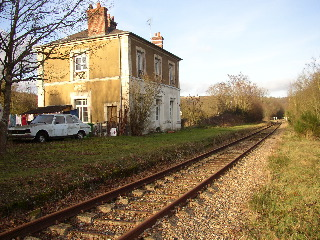
- The railway station in Berjou
- Location of Berjou
- Location within France Location within Normandy
- Coordinates: 48°51′01″N 0°28′51″W
- Country: France
- Region: Normandy
- Department: Orne
- Arrondissement: Argentan
- Canton: Athis-Val de Rouvre
- Intercommunality: CA Flers Agglo

Government
  - Mayor (2020–2026): Didier Vieceli
- Area^{1}: 8.82 km^{2} (3.41 sq mi)
- Elevation: 200 m (660 ft)
- Highest elevation: 257 m (843 ft)
- Lowest elevation: 58 m (190 ft)
- Population (2023): 417
  - Density: 47.3/km^{2} (122/sq mi)
- Time zone: UTC+01:00 (CET)
  - Summer (DST): UTC+02:00 (CEST)
- INSEE/Postal code: 61044 /61430
- ^{1} French Land Register data, which excludes lakes, ponds, glaciers > 1 km^{2} (0.386 sq mi or 247 acres) and river estuaries.

Berjou (French pronunciation: [bɛʁʒu]) is a commune in the Orne department in northwestern France.

== Geography ==
The commune is part of the area known as Suisse Normande.

The commune is made up of the following collection of villages and hamlets, Cambercourt,Les Oiseaux, Les Cours,Le Hamel, La Trollière, Le Fang, Vervent and Berjou.

The Commune with another 20 communes shares part of a 2,115 hectare, Natura 2000 conservation area, called the Vallée de l'Orne et ses affluents.

The commune has the river Noireau running through it.

== Population ==
Historical population
Year	Pop.	±% p.a.
1968	473	—
1975	522	+1.42%
1982	535	+0.35%
1990	525	−0.24%
1999	508	−0.37%
2007	475	−0.84%
2012	483	+0.33%
2017	461	−0.93%
2023	417	−1.66%
Source: INSEE

== Places of interest ==
- Museum of the liberation of Berjou was opened in 2011 and retraces the fighting of August 15, 16 and 17, 1944 around the River Noireau as part of the battle of the Falaise pocket.

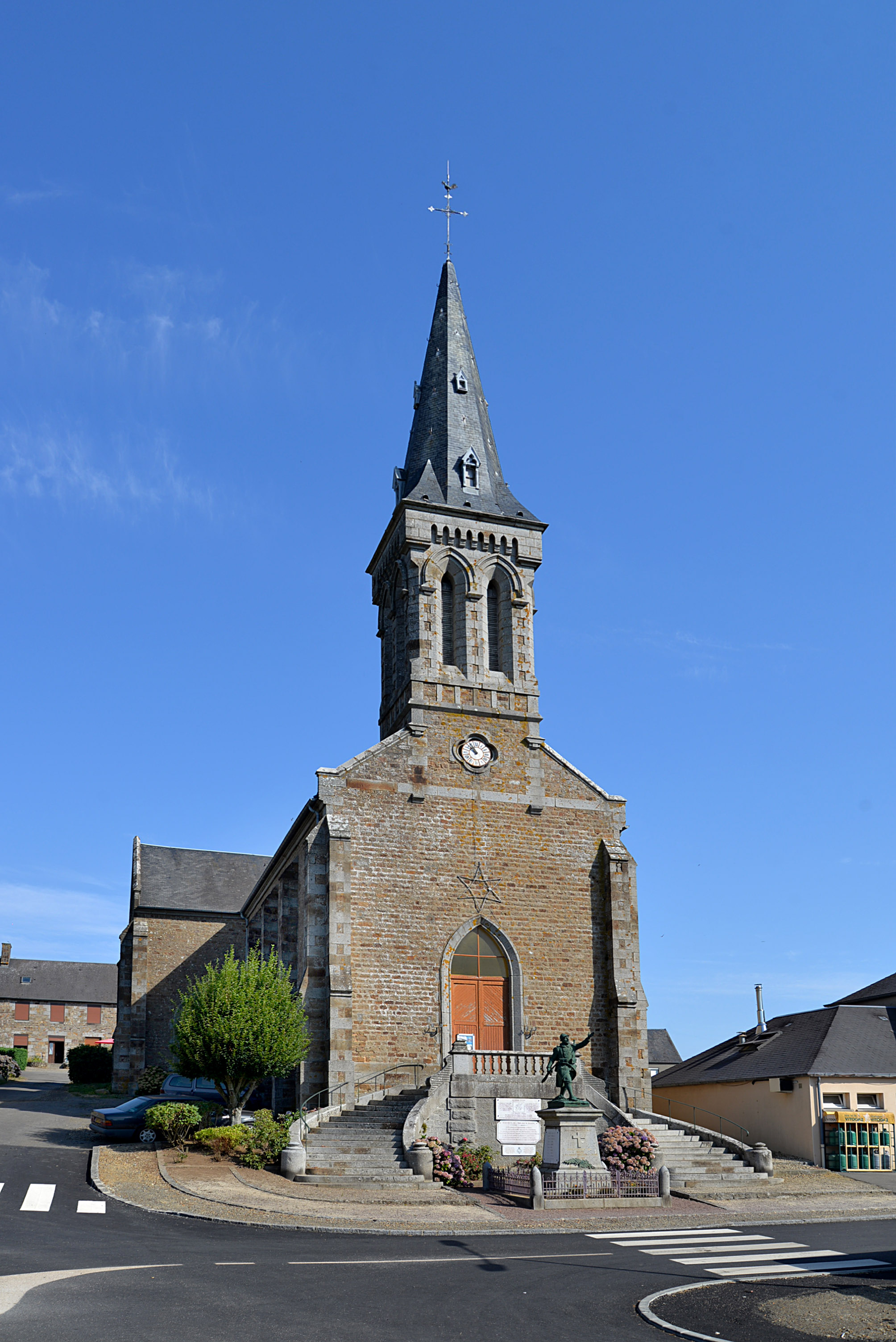
Notre-Dame church in Berjou

== See also ==
- Communes of the Orne department
- Berjeau
