= Saint-Georges-d'Aunay =

- Part of Seulline
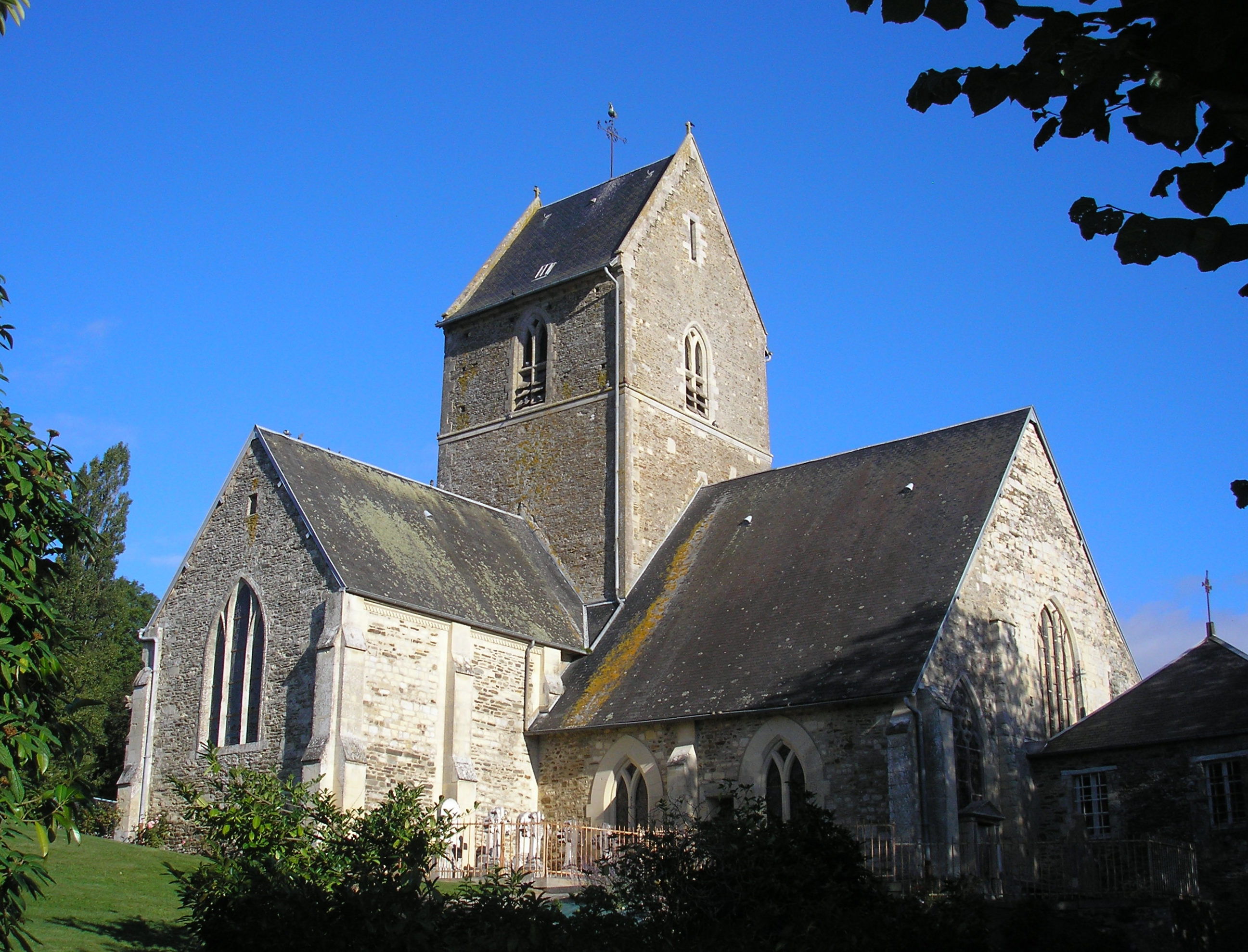
- Location of Saint-Georges-d'Aunay
- Location within France Location within Normandy
- Coordinates: 49°02′16″N 0°40′47″W
- Country: France
- Region: Normandy
- Department: Calvados
- Arrondissement: Vire
- Canton: Les Monts d'Aunay
- Commune: Seulline
- Area^{1}: 23.51 km^{2} (9.08 sq mi)
- Elevation: 215 m (705 ft)
- Highest elevation: 325 m (1,066 ft)
- Lowest elevation: 117 m (384 ft)
- Population (2023): 708
  - Density: 30.1/km^{2} (78.0/sq mi)
- Time zone: UTC+01:00 (CET)
  - Summer (DST): UTC+02:00 (CEST)
- Postal code: 14260
- ^{1} French Land Register data, which excludes lakes, ponds, glaciers > 1 km^{2} (0.386 sq mi or 247 acres) and river estuaries.

Saint-Georges-d'Aunay is a former commune in the Calvados department in the Normandy region in northwestern France. On 1 January 2016, it was merged into the new commune of Seulline.

== See also ==
- Communes of the Calvados department
