= Glos-sur-Risle =

- Commune
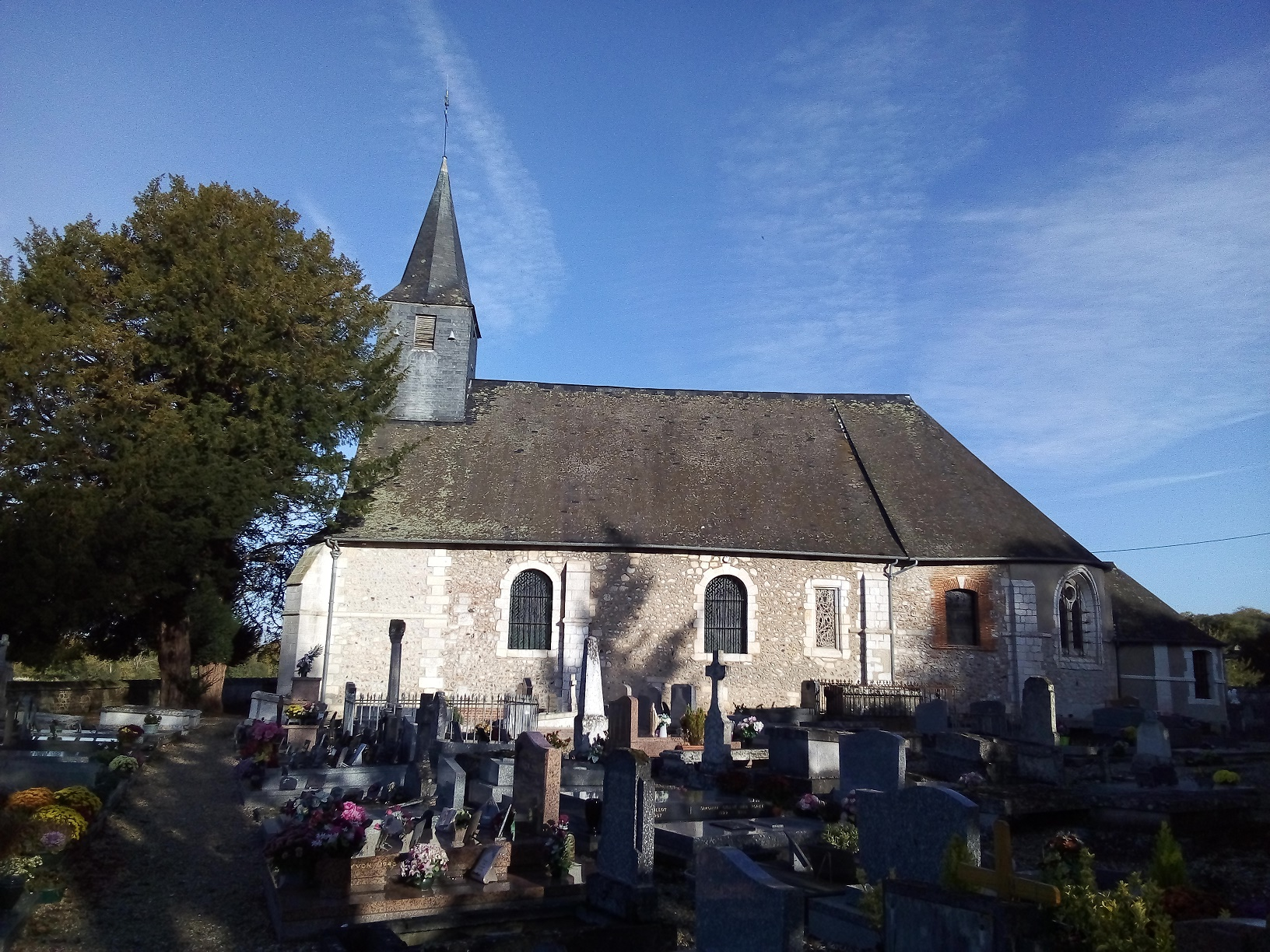
- The church in Glos-sur-Risle
- Location of Glos-sur-Risle
- Location within France Location within Normandy
- Coordinates: 49°16′14″N 0°40′54″E
- Country: France
- Region: Normandy
- Department: Eure
- Arrondissement: Bernay
- Canton: Pont-Audemer

Government
  - Mayor (2020–2026): André Tihy
- Area^{1}: 7.33 km^{2} (2.83 sq mi)
- Highest elevation: 135 m (443 ft)
- Lowest elevation: 31 m (102 ft)
- Population (2023): 584
  - Density: 79.7/km^{2} (206/sq mi)
- Time zone: UTC+01:00 (CET)
  - Summer (DST): UTC+02:00 (CEST)
- INSEE/Postal code: 27288 /27290
- ^{1} French Land Register data, which excludes lakes, ponds, glaciers > 1 km^{2} (0.386 sq mi or 247 acres) and river estuaries.

Glos-sur-Risle (French pronunciation: [ɡlo syʁ ʁil], literally Glos on Risle) is a commune in the Eure department in northern France.

== Geography ==
The commune along with another 69 communes shares part of a 4,747 hectare, Natura 2000 conservation area, called Risle, Guiel, Charentonne.

== Population ==
Historical population
| Year | Pop. | ±% p.a. |
|---|---|---|
| 1968 | 413 | — |
| 1975 | 413 | +0.00% |
| 1982 | 404 | −0.31% |
| 1990 | 442 | +1.13% |
| 1999 | 415 | −0.70% |
| 2007 | 429 | +0.42% |
| 2012 | 507 | +3.40% |
| 2017 | 591 | +3.11% |
| 2023 | 584 | −0.20% |
Source: INSEE

== See also ==
- Communes of the Eure department
