= Berjeau =

Berjeau is a French surname. Notable people with the surname include:

- Jean-Paul Berjeau (born 1953), French swimmer
- Philibert Charles Berjeau (1845–1927), scientific illustrator and lithographer
