= Motteville =

- Commune
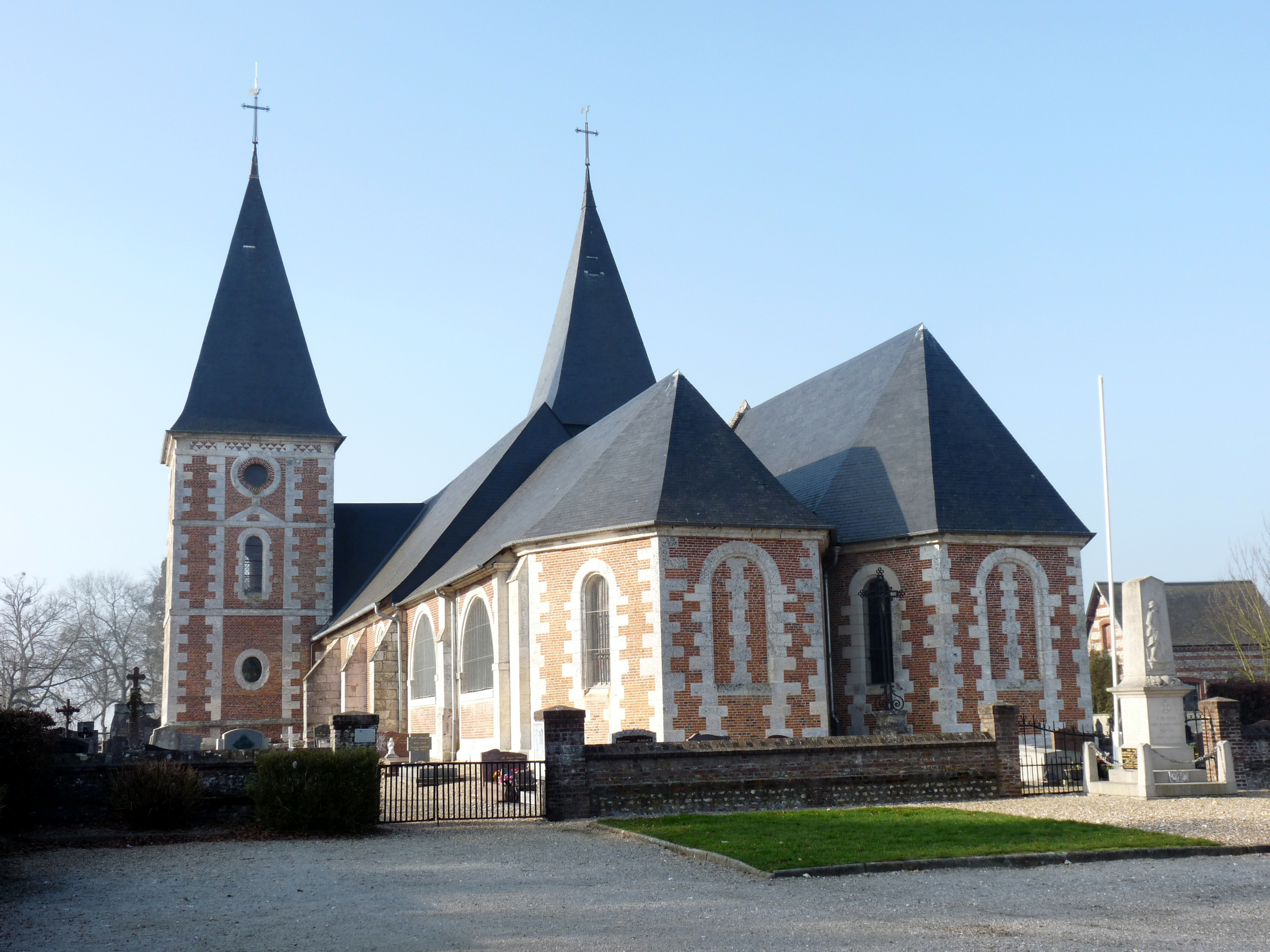
- The church in Motteville
- Location of Motteville
- Location within France Location within Normandy
- Coordinates: 49°38′10″N 0°51′22″E
- Country: France
- Region: Normandy
- Department: Seine-Maritime
- Arrondissement: Rouen
- Canton: Yvetot
- Intercommunality: CC Plateau de Caux

Government
  - Mayor (2026–32): Eric Halbourg
- Area^{1}: 8.68 km^{2} (3.35 sq mi)
- Elevation: 150 m (490 ft)
- Highest elevation: 157 m (515 ft)
- Lowest elevation: 135 m (443 ft)
- Population (2023): 785
  - Density: 90.4/km^{2} (234/sq mi)
- Time zone: UTC+01:00 (CET)
  - Summer (DST): UTC+02:00 (CEST)
- INSEE/Postal code: 76456 /76970
- ^{1} French Land Register data, which excludes lakes, ponds, glaciers > 1 km^{2} (0.386 sq mi or 247 acres) and river estuaries.

Motteville is a commune in the Seine-Maritime department in the Normandy region in northern France.

== Geography ==
A farming village situated in the Pays de Caux, some 22 miles (35 km) northwest of Rouen at the junction of the D20, D89, D53 and the D336 roads. SNCF operates a TER (train) train service here.

== Population ==
Historical population
Year	Pop.	±% p.a.
1968	604	—
1975	620	+0.37%
1982	666	+1.03%
1990	706	+0.73%
1999	730	+0.37%
2007	730	+0.00%
2012	787	+1.52%
2017	791	+0.10%
2023	785	−0.13%
Source: INSEE

== Places of interest ==
- The church of St.Michel, dating from the thirteenth century.
- The Château Henri IV
- The sixteenth century fortified manorhouse.

== See also ==
- Communes of the Seine-Maritime department
