= Rouen Saint-Sever station =

Railway station in Rouen, France

Rouen Saint-Server
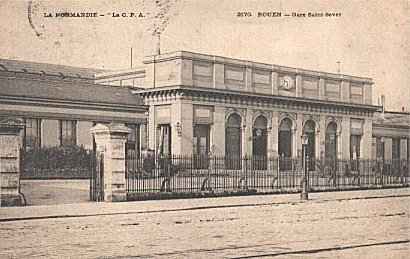
- Rouen Saint-Server station at the beginning of the XX^{th} century

General information
- Location: Rouen; France
- Coordinates: 49°25′58″N 1°05′36″E
- Operator: SNCF

History
- Opened: 3 May 1843
- Closed: 1944
Location

Rouen Saint-Sever was a large railway station serving the city of Rouen, in Normandy, northern France. The station was situated along the quais of the River Seine to the east of city's centre.

The station opened on May 3, 1843, when the line from Paris-Saint-Lazare to Rouen opened to service. The station was destroyed in 1944 by the Allied bombardments and was not reopened to passenger traffic after repairs. A short-lived SNCF staff station called Rouen Préfecture occupied the site but closed in the 1990s.

On December 19, 2005, Rouen's municipal council unanimously agreed on reopening the station. The new station was to be built on the site of the former station by 2020, but in 2025 no construction had started and studies were still being conducted.

== See also ==
- Rouen Rue-Verte
- Paris – Normandy new line
