= Caudebec-lès-Elbeuf =

- Commune
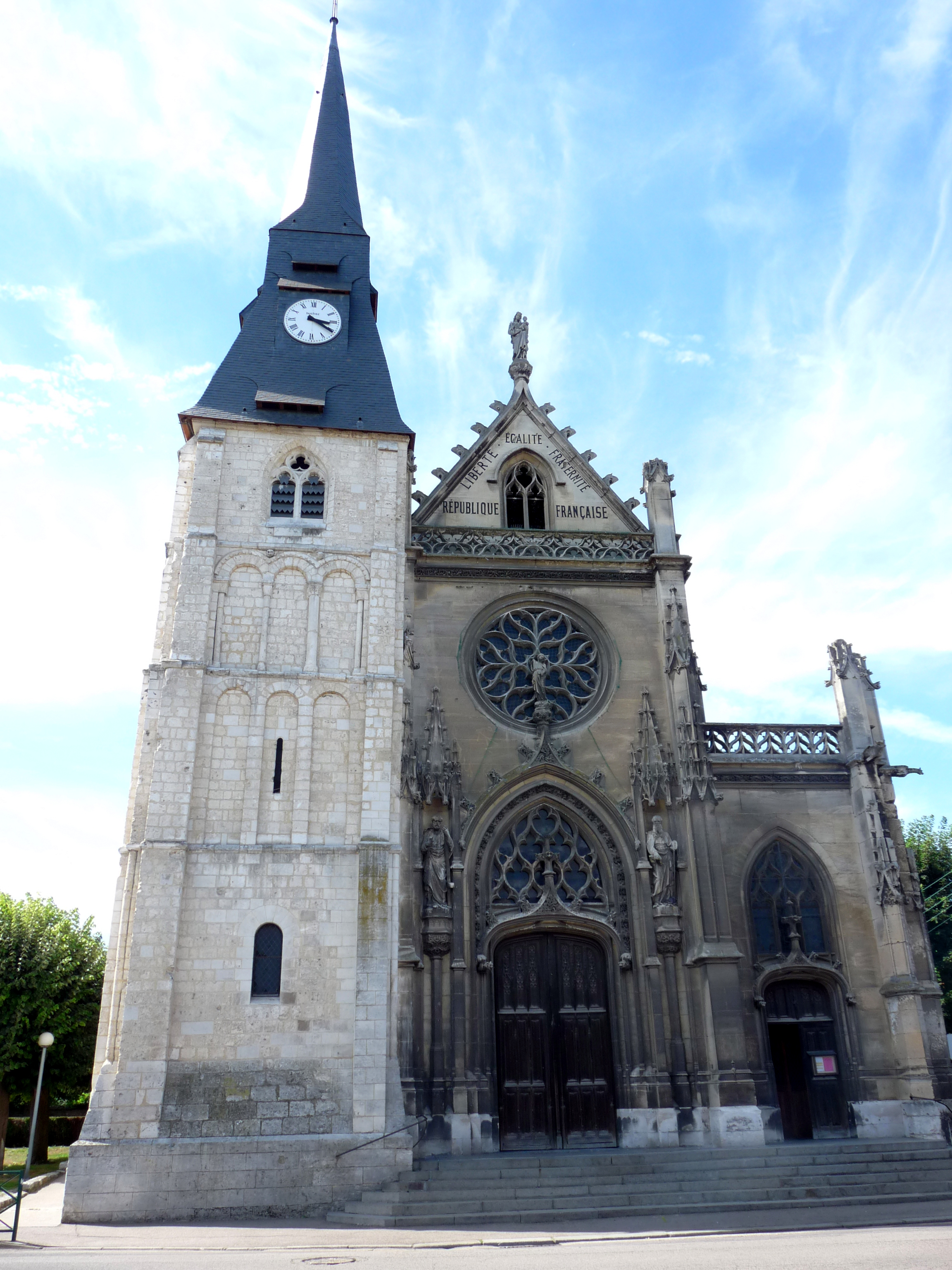
- The church in Caudebec-lès-Elbeuf

- Coat of arms
- Location of Caudebec-lès-Elbeuf
- Location within France Location within Normandy
- Coordinates: 49°16′54″N 1°01′20″E
- Country: France
- Region: Normandy
- Department: Seine-Maritime
- Arrondissement: Rouen
- Canton: Caudebec-lès-Elbeuf
- Intercommunality: Métropole Rouen Normandie

Government
  - Mayor (2026–32): Laurent Bonnaterre
- Area^{1}: 3.68 km^{2} (1.42 sq mi)
- Elevation: 13 m (43 ft)
- Highest elevation: 75 m (246 ft)
- Lowest elevation: 4 m (13 ft)
- Population (2023): 10,476
  - Density: 2,850/km^{2} (7,370/sq mi)
- Time zone: UTC+01:00 (CET)
  - Summer (DST): UTC+02:00 (CEST)
- INSEE/Postal code: 76165 /76320
- ^{1} French Land Register data, which excludes lakes, ponds, glaciers > 1 km^{2} (0.386 sq mi or 247 acres) and river estuaries.

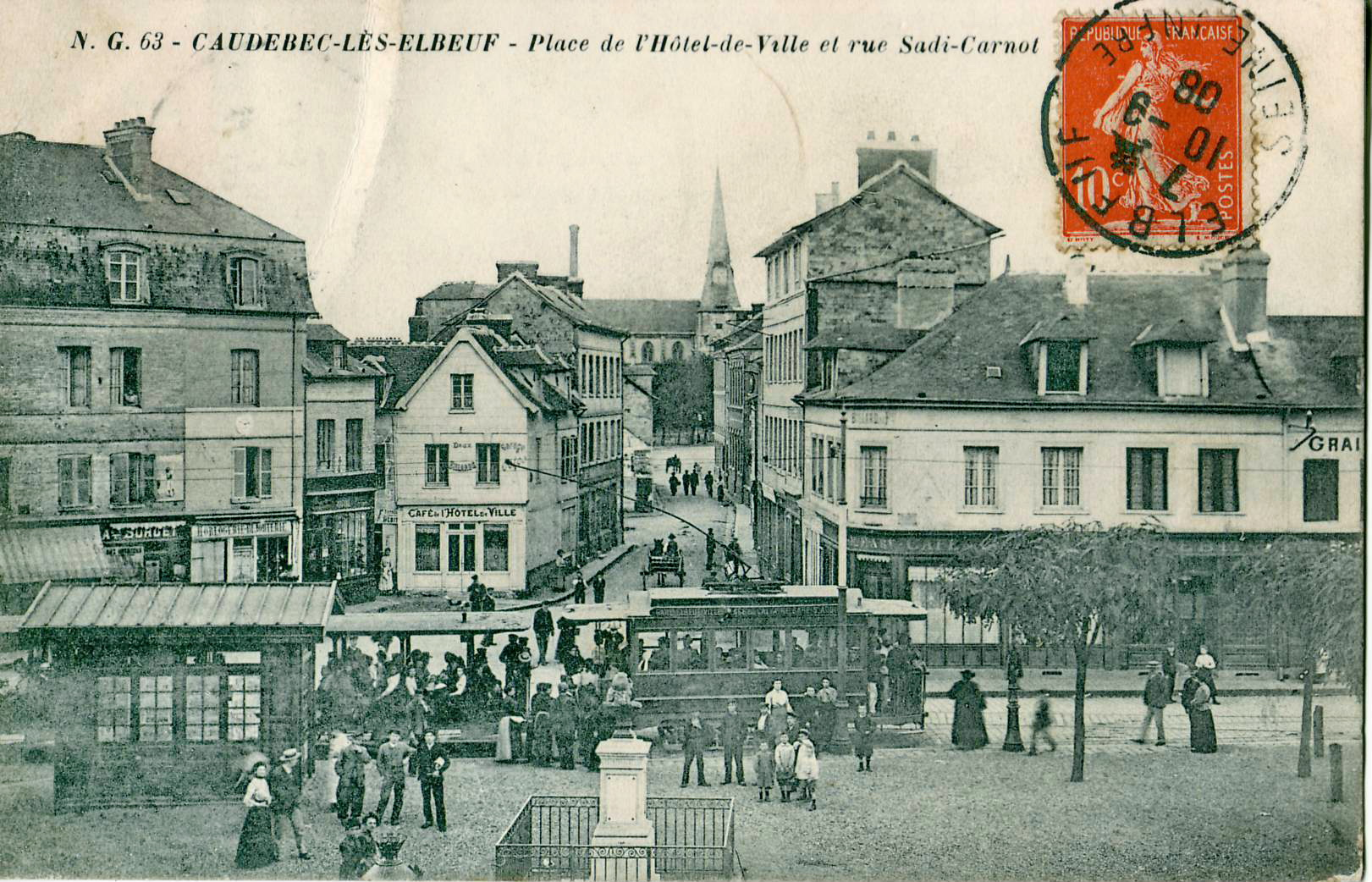
Past Times in the Town

Caudebec-lès-Elbeuf (French pronunciation: [kodbɛk lɛ.z‿ɛlbœf], literally Caudebec near Elbeuf) is a commune in the Seine-Maritime department in the Normandy region in northern France.

== Geography ==
A residential and light industrial town situated by the banks of the river Seine, some 13 miles (21 km) south of Rouen, at the junction of the D919 and the D921 roads.

It used to be the site of the Caudebec bore, or tidal wave, which several times a year rushed up the river from the sea. However the tidal estuary was changed to improve shipping access and the bore ceased to function.

=== Heraldry ===
Arms of Caudebec-lès-Elbeuf	The arms of Caudebec-lès-Elbeuf are blazoned: Gules, a sickle reversed and sprig of mistletoe in saltire between (a lance inverted and a throwing axe [francisca] in saltire surmounting a gaulish shield bendwise topped with a winged gaulish helmet contourny) and a dolmen Or charged with the letters ESUS sable impaled with Azure, a she-wolf nursing Romulus and Remus, standing on a pedestal Or charged with the inscription ROMA sable, and in chief a round shield surmounted by (i.e. overall over the shield), a sword palewise, a fasces bendwise, a Aquila bendwise sinister and a trumpet fesswise Or. (An Aquila is a Roman legion's eagle standard; the trumpet is a Roman trumpet 'tuba').

== Population ==
Historical population
Year	Pop.	±% p.a.
1968	9,595	—
1975	9,469	−0.19%
1982	8,963	−0.78%
1990	9,902	+1.25%
1999	9,904	+0.00%
2007	9,640	−0.34%
2012	10,030	+0.80%
2017	10,335	+0.60%
2023	10,476	+0.23%
Source: INSEE

== Places of interest ==
- The church of Notre-Dame, dating from the twelfth century.
- A twentieth-century château.

== Twin towns ==
- Dereham, England
- Vigarano Mainarda, Italy
- Bad Dürrenberg, Germany
- Prague - Libuš, Czech Republic

== See also ==
- Communes of the Seine-Maritime department
