= Delphine Philippe-Lemaître =

French historian, archaeologist, botanist (1798–1863)

Delphine Philippe-Lemaître (born 12 June 1798 in Pont-Audemer and died on 10 June 1863 in Illeville-sur-Montfort), (birthname Delphine Lemaître) was a French historian, archaeologist, botanist and poet.

== Biography ==
Delphine Lemaître showed a pronounced inclination for work from an early age and her unhappy marriage to Philippe Lemaitre caused her to find solace in botany, specifically the study of flowers. After devoting herself to botany, she began indulging her taste for French antiquities and published work in the Revue de Rouen and the Bulletin Monumental with investigations into the smallest details and complete descriptions of her subjects. Her research on the chapel and fountain of the Trinity at Ézy-sur-Eure drew attention to clues of Celtic antiquity, as did her descriptions of the Castle of La Court, at Saint-Philbert-sur-Risle, on the residence of the Château de Pontchartrain, the Choiseul-Gouffier and the Montpoignant.

=== Archaeologist ===
In an archaeological and historical notice about the Château de Sorel (Eure-et-Loir), Lemaître refuted the previous attribution to Agnès Sorel and whose engravings appear on the frieze of the portal. Lemaître showed with certainty that this portal was never the work of the Sorel herself and that it actually dated from the 17th century.

Lemaître conducted a study on the barony of Saint-Philbert-sur-Risle to clarify a historical fact relating to the history of the Dukes of Normandy, by providing irrefutable testimonies that Guillaume Longue-Épée, second Duke of Normandy, had not married Sprota, daughter of Herbert, Count of Senlis. Instead he had married Liutgarde, daughter of Héribert, Count of Vermandois. Lemaître showed that Sprota was only a dalliance of this prince and that after his assassination, after she had been forgotten and abandoned by everyone, she was taken in by Asperleng, a wealthy man and owner of the barony of Saint-Philbert, who married her. What had made several historians mistakenly accept the marriage of Duke William to Sprota was that this Duke, intending to retire to the monastery of Jumièges and having no children by his wife Liutgarde, recognized as his successor his son Richard, the fruit of his adulterous union with Sprota. After Lemaître published her research with numerous and conclusive proofs (already treated by Licquet in his History of Normandy), the question was closed for further debate.

The most enduring work left by Lemaître is her History of the Town and Castle of Dreux, about which writer Amélie Bosquet said that it "must place its author in the first rank among those erudite minds to whom it belongs to clear the thorny field of our local antiquities." Lemaître also researched the Roman roads of Roumois and she intended to write the history of the churches of the district of Pont-Audemer. She had already published several quality articles on this subject in the Bulletin Monumental as well as other notices about Montfort, Appeville, Brestot, and mainly on the stained glass windows of the church of Saint-Ouen in Pont-Audemer, when she died on 10 June 1863 in Illeville-sur-Montfort (Eure).

=== Memberships ===
Lemaître was a member of several professional societies: the Société d'Émulation, the Norman Association, the French Society for the Conservation of Monuments, and the Antiquaires de Normandie.

== Selected publications ==
- Notice on the stained glass windows of St. Ouen de Pont-Audemer (Eure), by Mrs. Philippe Lemaitre, 1853, Rouen
- Letters to Julie on botany and plant physiology, Rouen, ed. Mégard, 1839.
- Utilité Des Connaissances Élémentaires. Dialogue En Forme de Comédie, À l'Usage Des Écoles: Primaires Des Deux Sexes, Récité Pour La Première Fois, 1841, 26 p.
- Foreigner's guide or brief summary of the history and monuments of the city of Dreux, Rouen, Lecointe, 1845, in-12 of 36 p.
- Notice on the castle of Sorel in Pincerais (Eure-et-Loir), Revue de Rouen, 1848, p. 616–624.
- History of the town and castle of Dreux, with an archaeological notice on the church of St. Pierre de Dreux, by M. l'abbé de l'Hoste, Dreux, Lemenestrel, 1849–50, 2 vols.
- Historical documents and supporting documents for the history of Dreux, with a note on the church of St. Pierre de Dreux, by M. l'abbé de l'Hoste, Rouen, A. Peron, 1850, in-8° of 175 p.
