= Château de Montfort-sur-Risle =

Ruined castle in Normandy

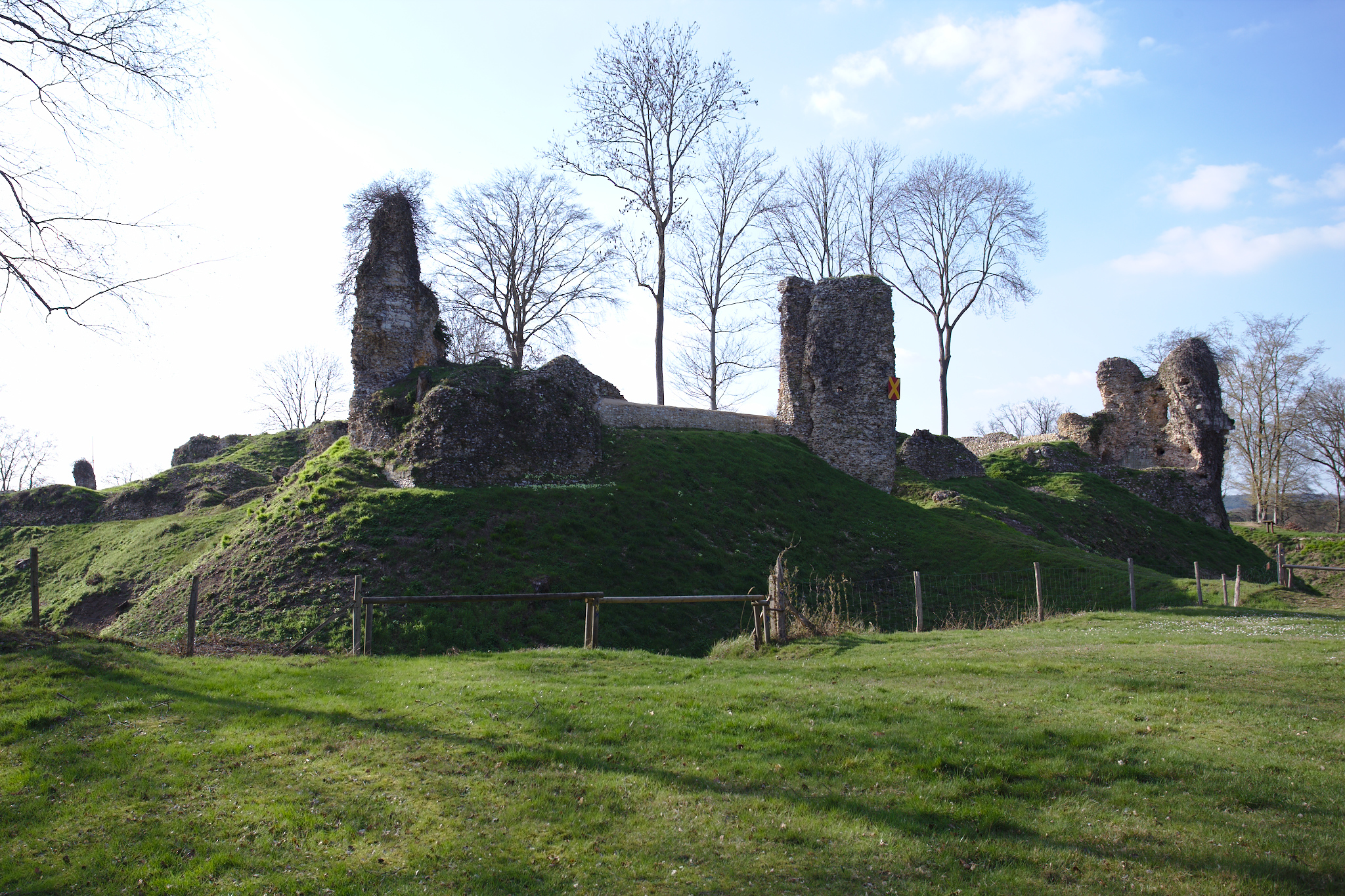
- Photo of the ruins of Montfort-sur-Risle in 2019
- 49.29546°N 0.66653°E
- Type: castle
- Cultures: Gallo-Roman
- Location: Eure, Normandy, France
- Region: Western Europe

History
- Built: 1035
- Built by: Hugues I de Montfort

Site notes
- Material: stone
- Archaeologists: Madame Claude Gilles
- Condition: undergoing restoration
- Website: amcp27.fr

The Château de Montfort-sur-Risle was a castle built in 1035 by Hugues I de Montfort in Montfort-sur-Risle, Eure, France. It lies in the heart of the Risle Valley between Pont-Audemer and Brionne. It is now a public site under restoration.

== History ==
After being initially built by Hugues I de Montfort, the small castle was then improved upon by his great-grandson, Hugues IV, in the first half of the 12th century.

It offered a strategic view over the valley during a time of conquest. It was then destroyed in a siege by King John of England in 1204.

In 1937, it became classified as one of France's Monuments Historiques (French Historic Monuments).

In 2003, L’association Montfort Culture et Patrimoine became the owners of the site and have spent the subsequent years restoring the castle and the 4.6 hectare area it is on.

In 2017, a video was posted showing excavations and examinations of the ruins. In 2018, with the help of funding from the Communauté de Communes Pont-Audemer-Val-de-Risle, an area with bathrooms and a courtyard for the public was created. In 2020, the discovery period finished and signage was added to prepare for its opening to the public.
