= Saint-Germain-Village =

- Part of Pont-Audemer
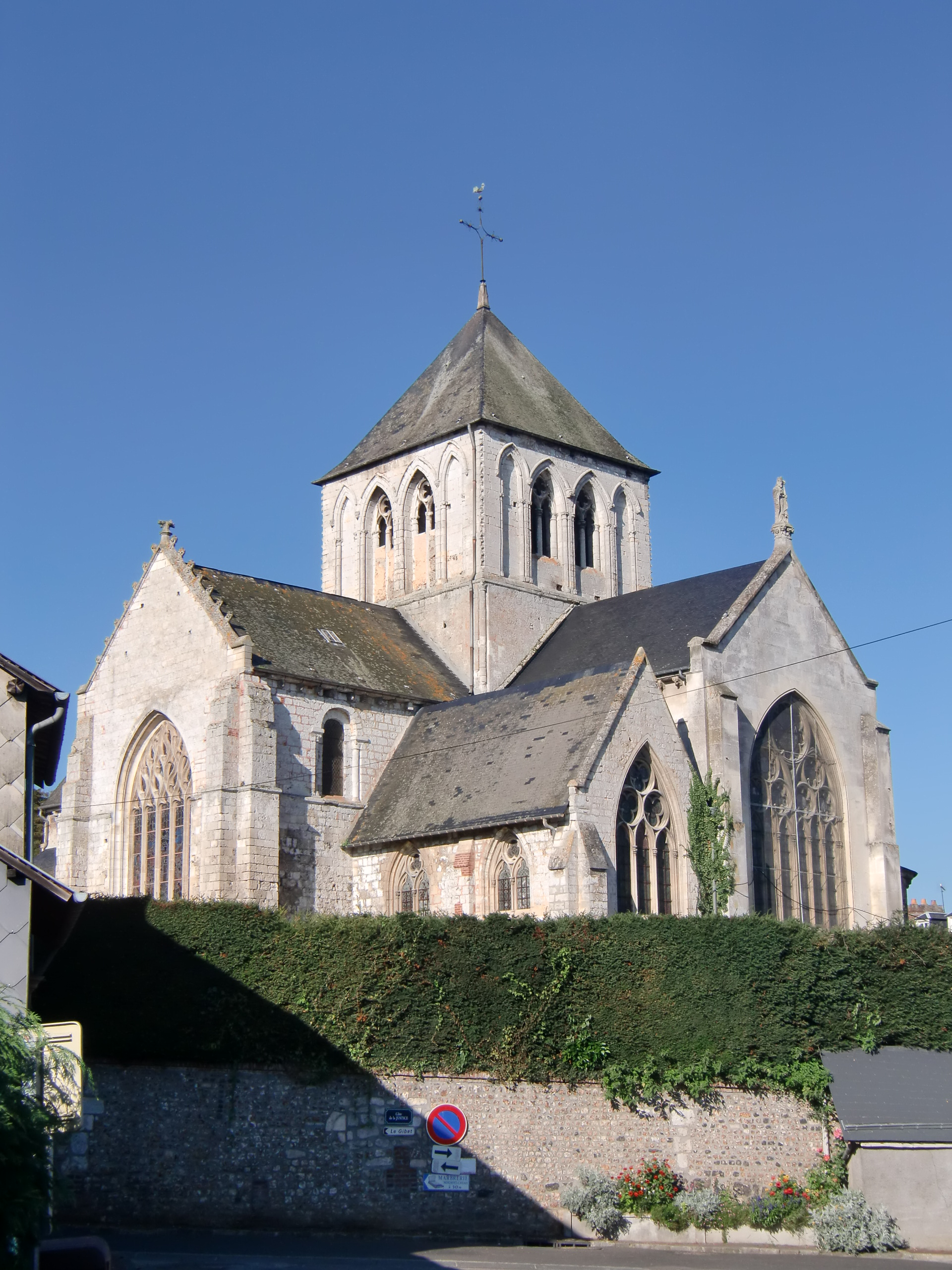
- Location of Saint-Germain-Village
- Location within France Location within Normandy
- Coordinates: 49°21′00″N 0°30′18″E
- Country: France
- Region: Normandy
- Department: Eure
- Arrondissement: Bernay
- Canton: Pont-Audemer
- Commune: Pont-Audemer
- Area^{1}: 5.31 km^{2} (2.05 sq mi)
- Elevation: 15 m (49 ft)
- Highest elevation: 126 m (413 ft)
- Lowest elevation: 4 m (13 ft)
- Population (2019): 1,733
  - Density: 326/km^{2} (845/sq mi)
- Time zone: UTC+01:00 (CET)
  - Summer (DST): UTC+02:00 (CEST)
- Postal code: 27500
- ^{1} French Land Register data, which excludes lakes, ponds, glaciers > 1 km^{2} (0.386 sq mi or 247 acres) and river estuaries.

Saint-Germain-Village (French pronunciation: [sɛ̃ ʒɛʁmɛ̃ vilaʒ]) is a former commune in the Eure department in Normandy in northern France. On 1 January 2018, it was merged into the commune of Pont-Audemer.

== Population ==
Historical population
Year	Pop.	±% p.a.
1962	1,016	—
1968	1,042	+0.42%
1975	1,114	+0.96%
1982	1,235	+1.48%
1990	1,481	+2.30%
1999	1,528	+0.35%
2019	1,733	+0.63%
Source: EHESS and INSEE

== See also ==
- Communes of the Eure department
