= Freneuse =

Freneuse may refer to the following communes in France:

- Freneuse, Seine-Maritime, in the Seine-Maritime département
- Freneuse, Yvelines, in the Yvelines département
- Freneuse-sur-Risle, in the Eure département
