= Campigny, Eure =

Campigny
- Commune
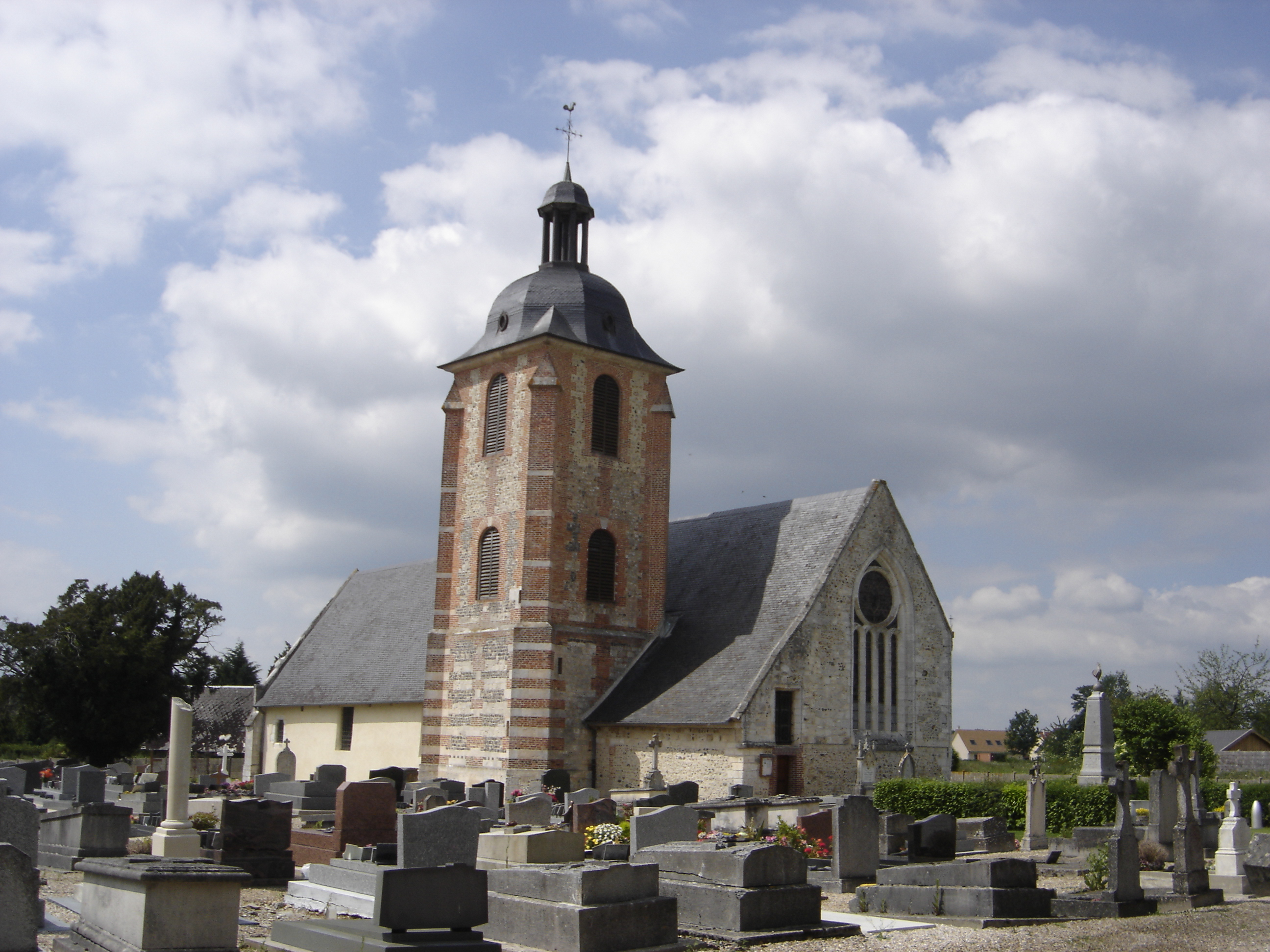
- The church in Campigny
- Location of Campigny
- Location within France Location within Normandy
- Coordinates: 49°18′40″N 0°33′17″E
- Country: France
- Region: Normandy
- Department: Eure
- Arrondissement: Bernay
- Canton: Pont-Audemer
- Intercommunality: Pont-Audemer / Val de Risle

Government
  - Mayor (2020–2026): Jean-Marc Bisson
- Area^{1}: 10.74 km^{2} (4.15 sq mi)
- Elevation: 121 m (397 ft)
- Highest elevation: 128 m (420 ft)
- Lowest elevation: 15 m (49 ft)
- Population (2023): 1,085
  - Density: 101.0/km^{2} (261.7/sq mi)
- Time zone: UTC+01:00 (CET)
  - Summer (DST): UTC+02:00 (CEST)
- INSEE/Postal code: 27126 /27500
- ^{1} French Land Register data, which excludes lakes, ponds, glaciers > 1 km^{2} (0.386 sq mi or 247 acres) and river estuaries.

Campigny (French pronunciation: [kɑ̃piɲi]) is a commune in the Eure department in northern France.

== Geography ==
The commune along with another 69 communes shares part of a 4,747 hectare, Natura 2000 conservation area, called Risle, Guiel, Charentonne.

== Population ==
Historical population
Year	Pop.	±% p.a.
1968	505	—
1975	509	+0.11%
1982	705	+4.76%
1990	807	+1.70%
1999	803	−0.06%
2007	859	+0.85%
2012	1,086	+4.80%
2017	1,201	+2.03%
2023	1,085	−1.68%
Source: INSEE

== See also ==
- Communes of the Eure department
