= Appeville-Annebault =

- Commune
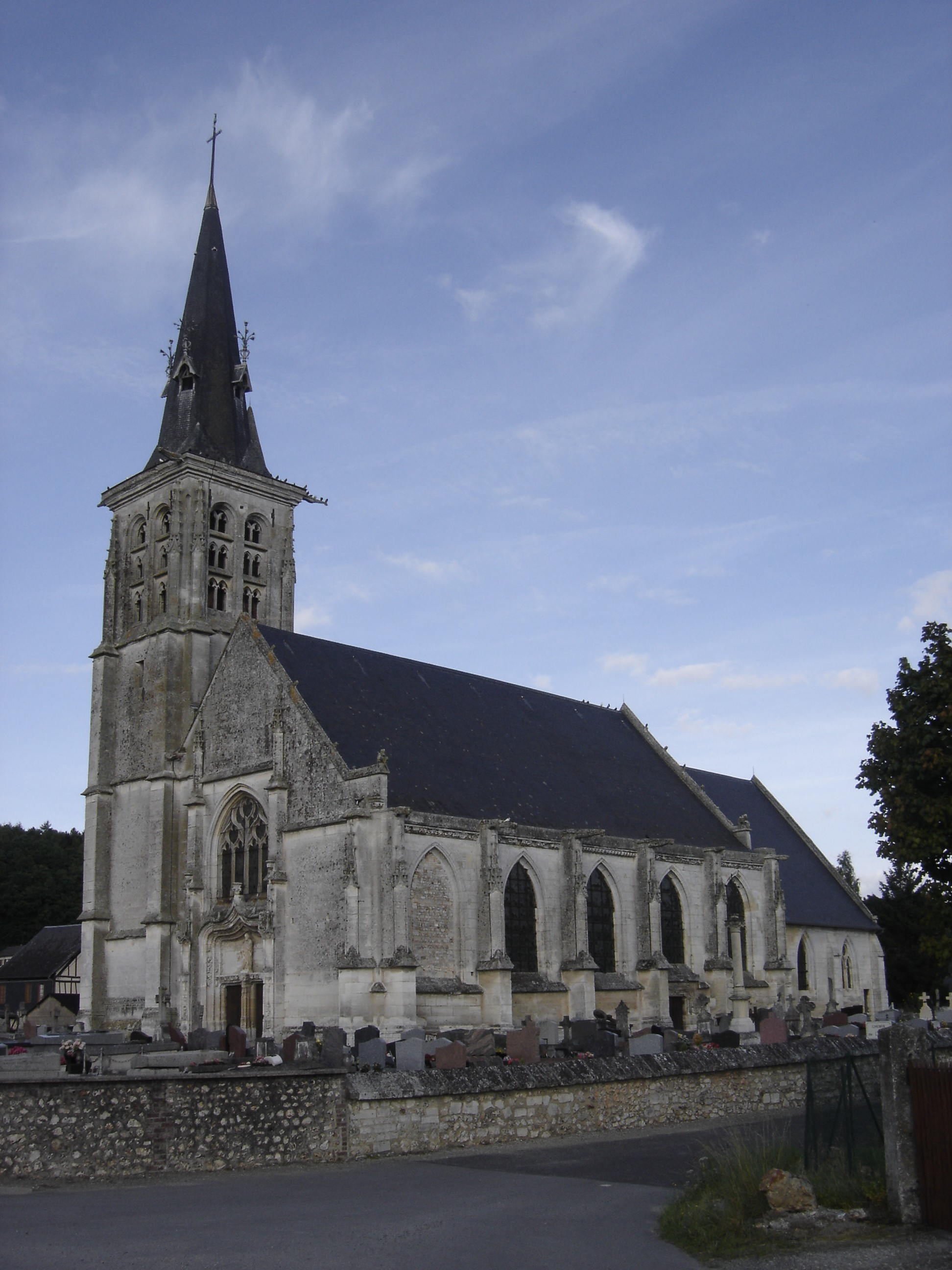
- The church in Appeville-Annebault

- Coat of arms
- Location of Appeville-Annebault
- Location within France Location within Normandy
- Coordinates: 49°19′51″N 0°38′35″E
- Country: France
- Region: Normandy
- Department: Eure
- Arrondissement: Bernay
- Canton: Pont-Audemer
- Intercommunality: Pont-Audemer / Val de Risle

Government
  - Mayor (2020–2026): Carole de Andres
- Area^{1}: 13.35 km^{2} (5.15 sq mi)
- Elevation: 16 m (52 ft)
- Highest elevation: 132 m (433 ft)
- Lowest elevation: 19 m (62 ft)
- Population (2023): 1,004
  - Density: 75.21/km^{2} (194.8/sq mi)
- Time zone: UTC+01:00 (CET)
  - Summer (DST): UTC+02:00 (CEST)
- INSEE/Postal code: 27018 /27290
- ^{1} French Land Register data, which excludes lakes, ponds, glaciers > 1 km^{2} (0.386 sq mi or 247 acres) and river estuaries.

Appeville-Annebault (French pronunciation: [apvil anbo]) is a commune in the Eure department in Normandy in northern France.

== Geography ==
The commune along with another 69 communes shares part of a 4,747 hectare, Natura 2000 conservation area, called Risle, Guiel, Charentonne.

== Population ==
Historical population
Year	Pop.	±% p.a.
1968	643	—
1975	617	−0.59%
1982	723	+2.29%
1990	779	+0.94%
1999	779	+0.00%
2007	874	+1.45%
2012	924	+1.12%
2017	1,013	+1.86%
2023	1,004	−0.15%
Source: INSEE

== See also ==
- Communes of the Eure department
