= Saint-Symphorien, Eure =

Saint-Symphorien
- Commune
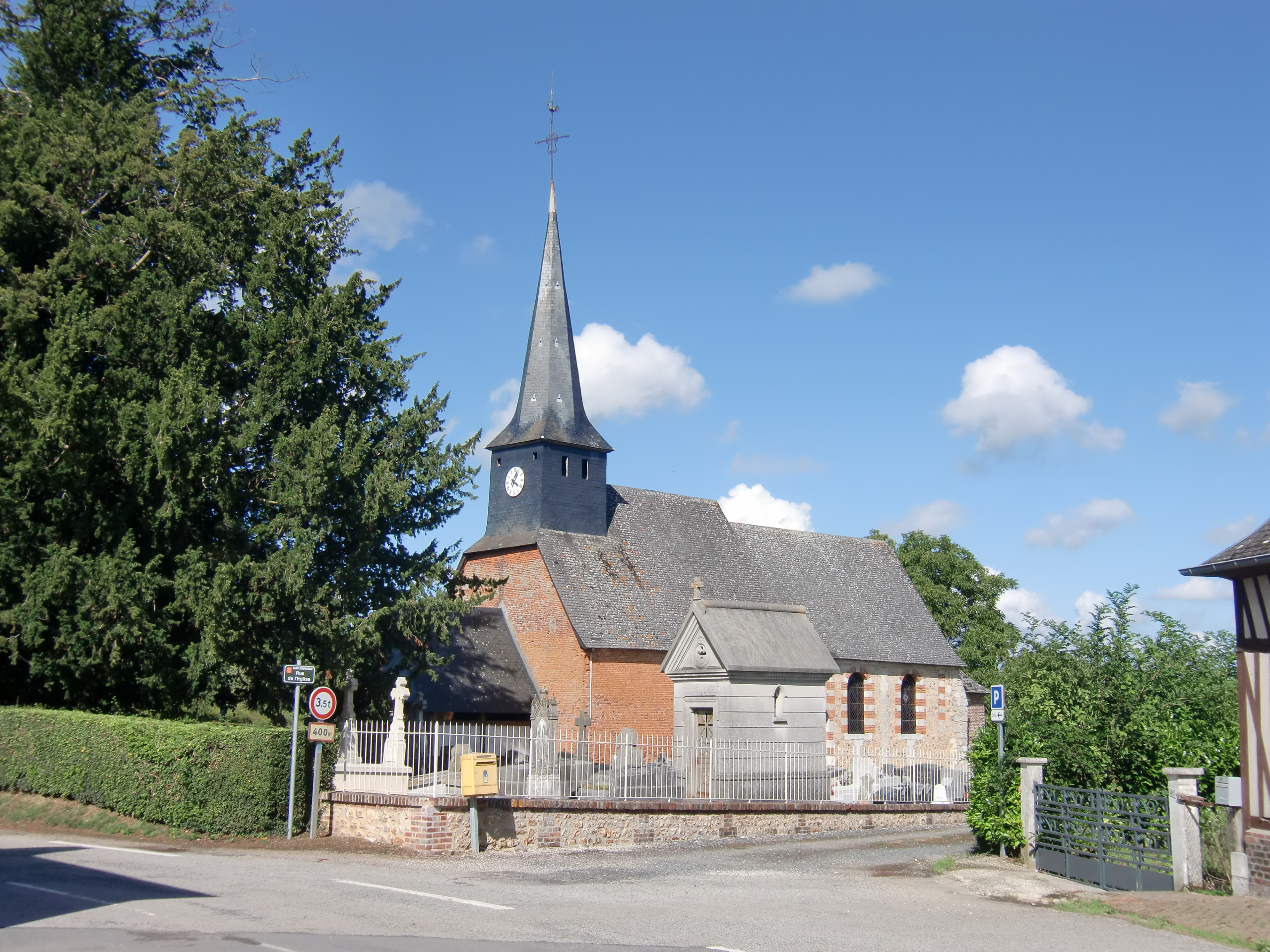
- The church in Saint-Symphorien
- Location of Saint-Symphorien
- Location within France Location within Normandy
- Coordinates: 49°18′54″N 0°28′05″E
- Country: France
- Region: Normandy
- Department: Eure
- Arrondissement: Bernay
- Canton: Pont-Audemer

Government
  - Mayor (2025–2026): Alain Vétel
- Area^{1}: 3.78 km^{2} (1.46 sq mi)
- Elevation: 100 m (330 ft)
- Highest elevation: 136 m (446 ft)
- Lowest elevation: 83 m (272 ft)
- Population (2023): 466
  - Density: 123/km^{2} (319/sq mi)
- Time zone: UTC+01:00 (CET)
  - Summer (DST): UTC+02:00 (CEST)
- INSEE/Postal code: 27606 /27500
- ^{1} French Land Register data, which excludes lakes, ponds, glaciers > 1 km^{2} (0.386 sq mi or 247 acres) and river estuaries.

Saint-Symphorien (French pronunciation: [sɛ̃ sɛ̃fɔʁjɛ̃]) is a commune in the Eure department in Normandy in northern France.

== Population ==
Historical population
Year	Pop.	±% p.a.
1968	231	—
1975	245	+0.84%
1982	293	+2.59%
1990	320	+1.11%
1999	322	+0.07%
2007	372	+1.82%
2012	429	+2.89%
2017	488	+2.61%
2023	466	−0.77%
Source: INSEE

== See also ==
- Communes of the Eure department
