= Triqueville =

- Commune
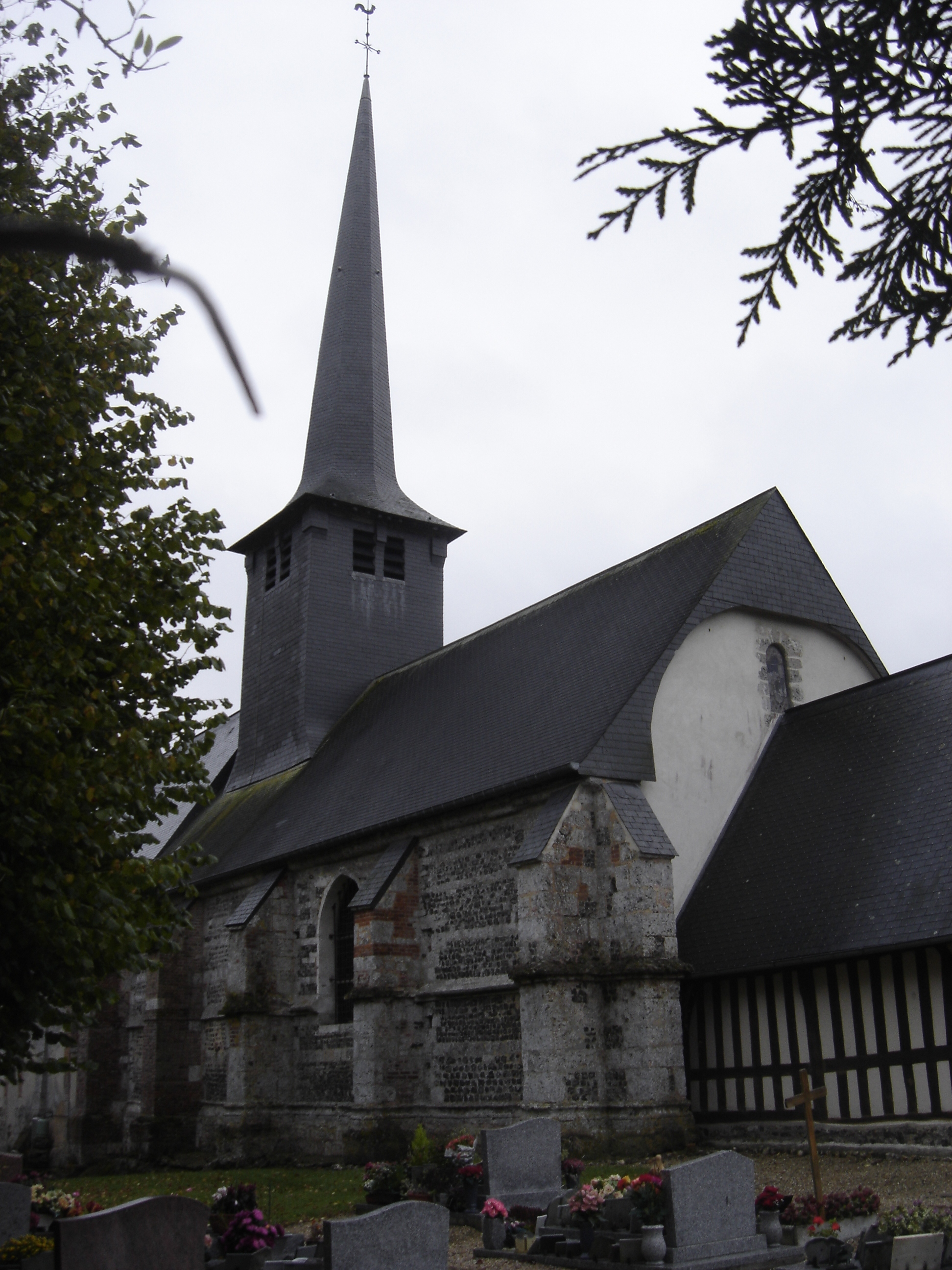
- The church in Triqueville
- Location of Triqueville
- Location within France Location within Normandy
- Coordinates: 49°20′14″N 0°26′30″E
- Country: France
- Region: Normandy
- Department: Eure
- Arrondissement: Bernay
- Canton: Pont-Audemer

Government
  - Mayor (2020–2026): Mathias Baptist
- Area^{1}: 9.48 km^{2} (3.66 sq mi)
- Elevation: 98 m (322 ft)
- Highest elevation: 133 m (436 ft)
- Lowest elevation: 23 m (75 ft)
- Population (2023): 350
  - Density: 37/km^{2} (96/sq mi)
- Time zone: UTC+01:00 (CET)
  - Summer (DST): UTC+02:00 (CEST)
- INSEE/Postal code: 27662 /27500
- ^{1} French Land Register data, which excludes lakes, ponds, glaciers > 1 km^{2} (0.386 sq mi or 247 acres) and river estuaries.

Triqueville (French pronunciation: [tʁikvil]) is a commune in the Eure department in Normandy in northern France.

== Population ==
Historical population
Year	Pop.	±% p.a.
1968	268	—
1975	289	+1.08%
1982	263	−1.34%
1990	259	−0.19%
1999	281	+0.91%
2007	296	+0.65%
2012	341	+2.87%
2017	332	−0.53%
2023	350	+0.88%
Source: INSEE

== See also ==
- Communes of the Eure department
