= Manneville-sur-Risle =

- Commune
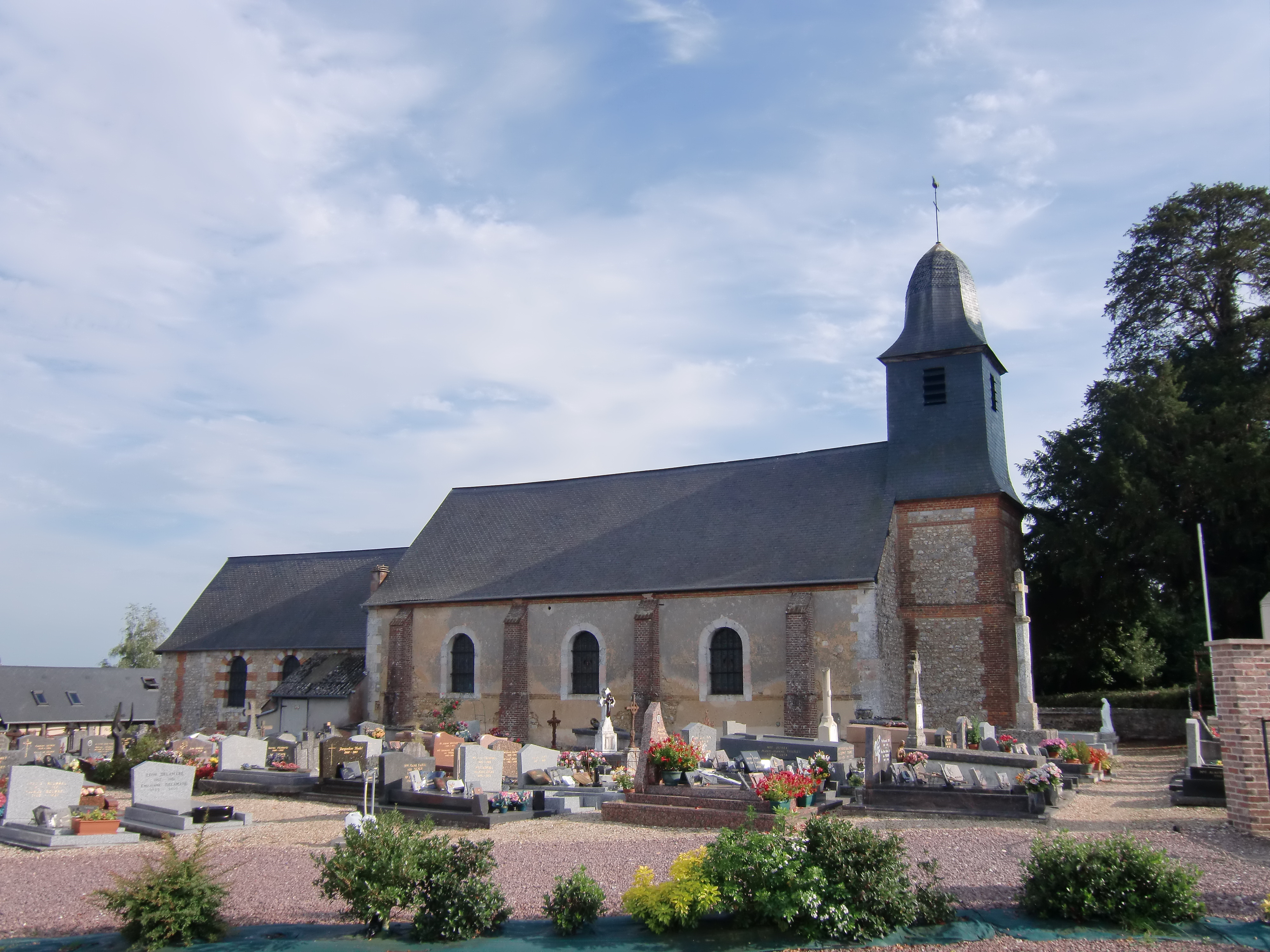
- The church in Manneville-sur-Risle
- Location of Manneville-sur-Risle
- Location within France Location within Normandy
- Coordinates: 49°21′29″N 0°32′25″E
- Country: France
- Region: Normandy
- Department: Eure
- Arrondissement: Bernay
- Canton: Pont-Audemer
- Intercommunality: Pont-Audemer / Val de Risle

Government
  - Mayor (2020–2026): Isabelle Duong
- Area^{1}: 9.32 km^{2} (3.60 sq mi)
- Elevation: 95 m (312 ft)
- Highest elevation: 131 m (430 ft)
- Lowest elevation: 9 m (30 ft)
- Population (2023): 1,417
  - Density: 152/km^{2} (394/sq mi)
- Time zone: UTC+01:00 (CET)
  - Summer (DST): UTC+02:00 (CEST)
- INSEE/Postal code: 27385 /27500
- ^{1} French Land Register data, which excludes lakes, ponds, glaciers > 1 km^{2} (0.386 sq mi or 247 acres) and river estuaries.

Manneville-sur-Risle (French pronunciation: [manvil syʁ ʁil], literally Manneville on Risle) is a commune in the Eure department in Normandy in northern France.

== Geography ==
The commune along with another 69 communes shares part of a 4,747 hectare, Natura 2000 conservation area, called Risle, Guiel, Charentonne.

== Population ==
Historical population
| Year | Pop. | ±% p.a. |
|---|---|---|
| 1968 | 970 | — |
| 1975 | 1,048 | +1.11% |
| 1982 | 1,019 | −0.40% |
| 1990 | 1,009 | −0.12% |
| 1999 | 1,028 | +0.21% |
| 2007 | 1,363 | +3.59% |
| 2012 | 1,498 | +1.91% |
| 2017 | 1,531 | +0.44% |
| 2023 | 1,417 | −1.28% |
Source: INSEE

== See also ==
- Communes of the Eure department
