= Illeville-sur-Montfort =

- Commune
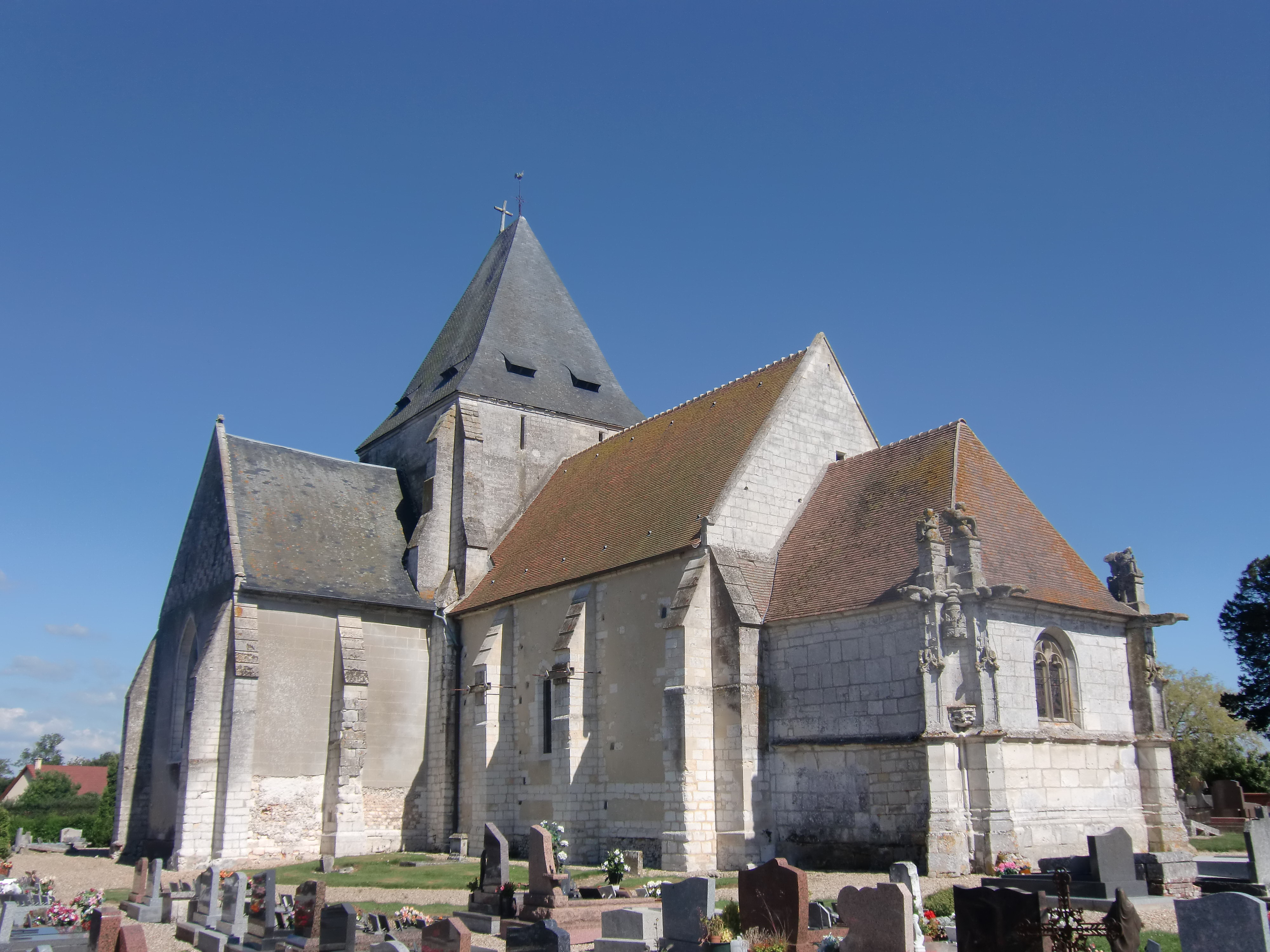
- The church of Saint-Médard in Illeville-sur-Montfort
- Location of Illeville-sur-Montfort
- Location within France Location within Normandy
- Coordinates: 49°19′37″N 0°43′39″E
- Country: France
- Region: Normandy
- Department: Eure
- Arrondissement: Bernay
- Canton: Pont-Audemer

Government
  - Mayor (2020–2026): Vladimir Hangard
- Area^{1}: 14.95 km^{2} (5.77 sq mi)
- Elevation: 144 m (472 ft)
- Highest elevation: 144 m (472 ft)
- Lowest elevation: 42 m (138 ft)
- Population (2023): 856
  - Density: 57.3/km^{2} (148/sq mi)
- Time zone: UTC+01:00 (CET)
  - Summer (DST): UTC+02:00 (CEST)
- INSEE/Postal code: 27349 /27290
- ^{1} French Land Register data, which excludes lakes, ponds, glaciers > 1 km^{2} (0.386 sq mi or 247 acres) and river estuaries.

Illeville-sur-Montfort (French pronunciation: [ilvil syʁ mɔ̃fɔʁ], literally Illeville on Montfort) is a commune in the Eure department in northern France.

== Population ==
Historical population
Year	Pop.	±% p.a.
1968	372	—
1975	357	−0.59%
1982	526	+5.69%
1990	680	+3.26%
1999	664	−0.26%
2007	795	+2.28%
2012	880	+2.05%
2017	874	−0.14%
2023	856	−0.35%
Source: INSEE

== See also ==
- Communes of the Eure department
