= Thierville =

- Commune
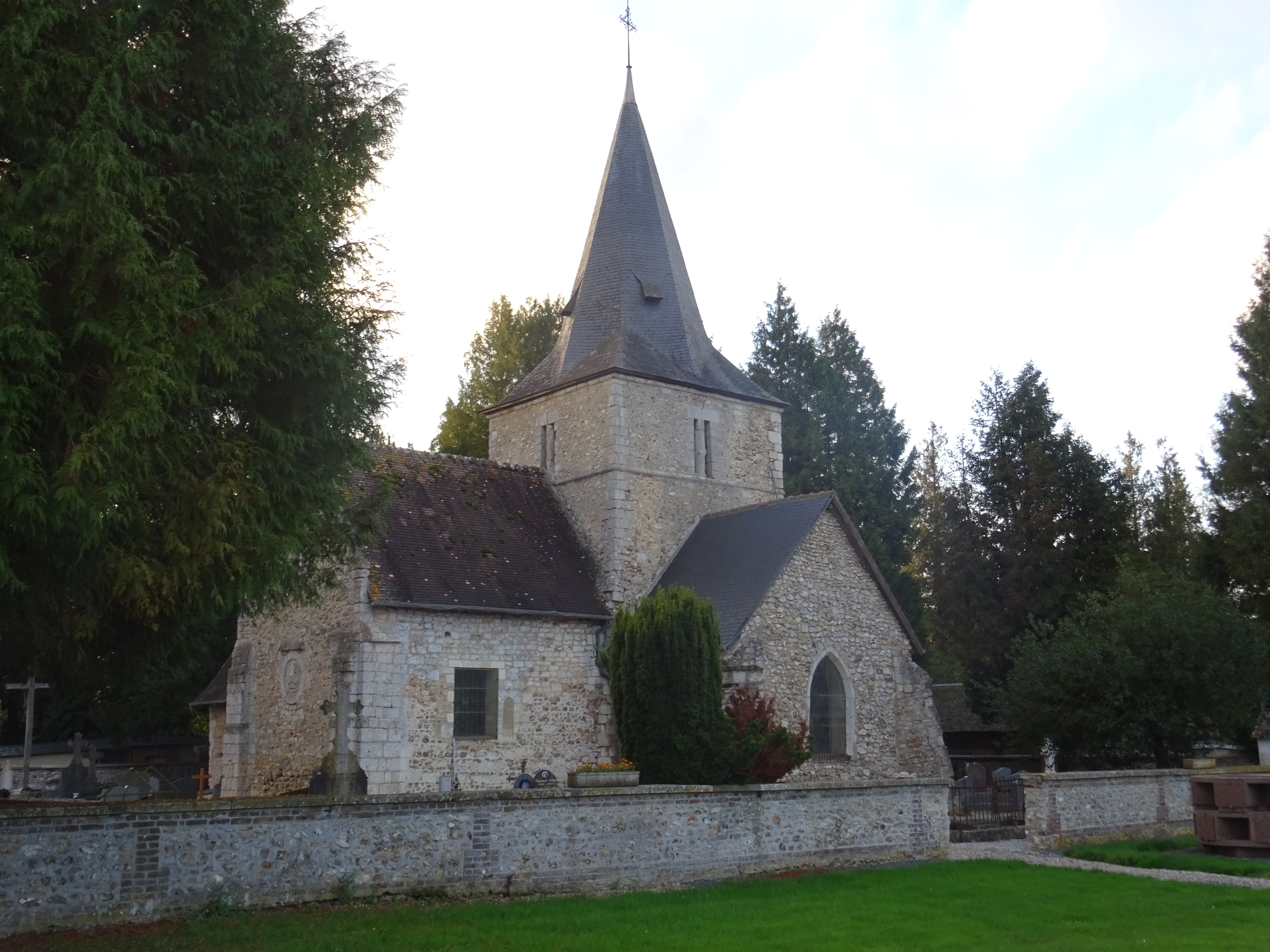
- The church in Thierville

- Coat of arms
- Location of Thierville
- Location within France Location within Normandy
- Coordinates: 49°16′04″N 0°43′14″E
- Country: France
- Region: Normandy
- Department: Eure
- Arrondissement: Bernay
- Canton: Pont-Audemer

Government
  - Mayor (2020–2026): Bertrand Simon
- Area^{1}: 3.6 km^{2} (1.4 sq mi)
- Elevation: 145 m (476 ft)
- Highest elevation: 144 m (472 ft)
- Lowest elevation: 60 m (200 ft)
- Population (2023): 365
  - Density: 100/km^{2} (260/sq mi)
- Time zone: UTC+01:00 (CET)
  - Summer (DST): UTC+02:00 (CEST)
- INSEE/Postal code: 27631 /27290
- ^{1} French Land Register data, which excludes lakes, ponds, glaciers > 1 km^{2} (0.386 sq mi or 247 acres) and river estuaries.

Thierville (French pronunciation: [tjɛʁvil]) is a commune in the Eure department in Normandy in northern France. It is around 30 km south-west of Rouen city centre, and around 130 km north west of Paris.

Thierville is remarkable as one of only 12 villages in all of France with no men lost from World War I. Even more remarkably, Thierville also suffered no losses in the Franco-Prussian War and World War II, nor in the First Indochina War nor the Algerian War. All the soldiers who took part in these five wars came back home.

== Population ==
Historical population
Year	Pop.	±% p.a.
1968	195	—
1975	198	+0.22%
1982	231	+2.23%
1990	242	+0.58%
1999	218	−1.15%
2007	279	+3.13%
2012	340	+4.03%
2017	371	+1.76%
2023	365	−0.27%
Source: INSEE

== Personalities ==
- Probable birthplace of Theobald of Bec, archbishop of Canterbury

== See also ==
- Communes of the Eure department
- Thankful Villages
