= Corneville-sur-Risle =

- Commune
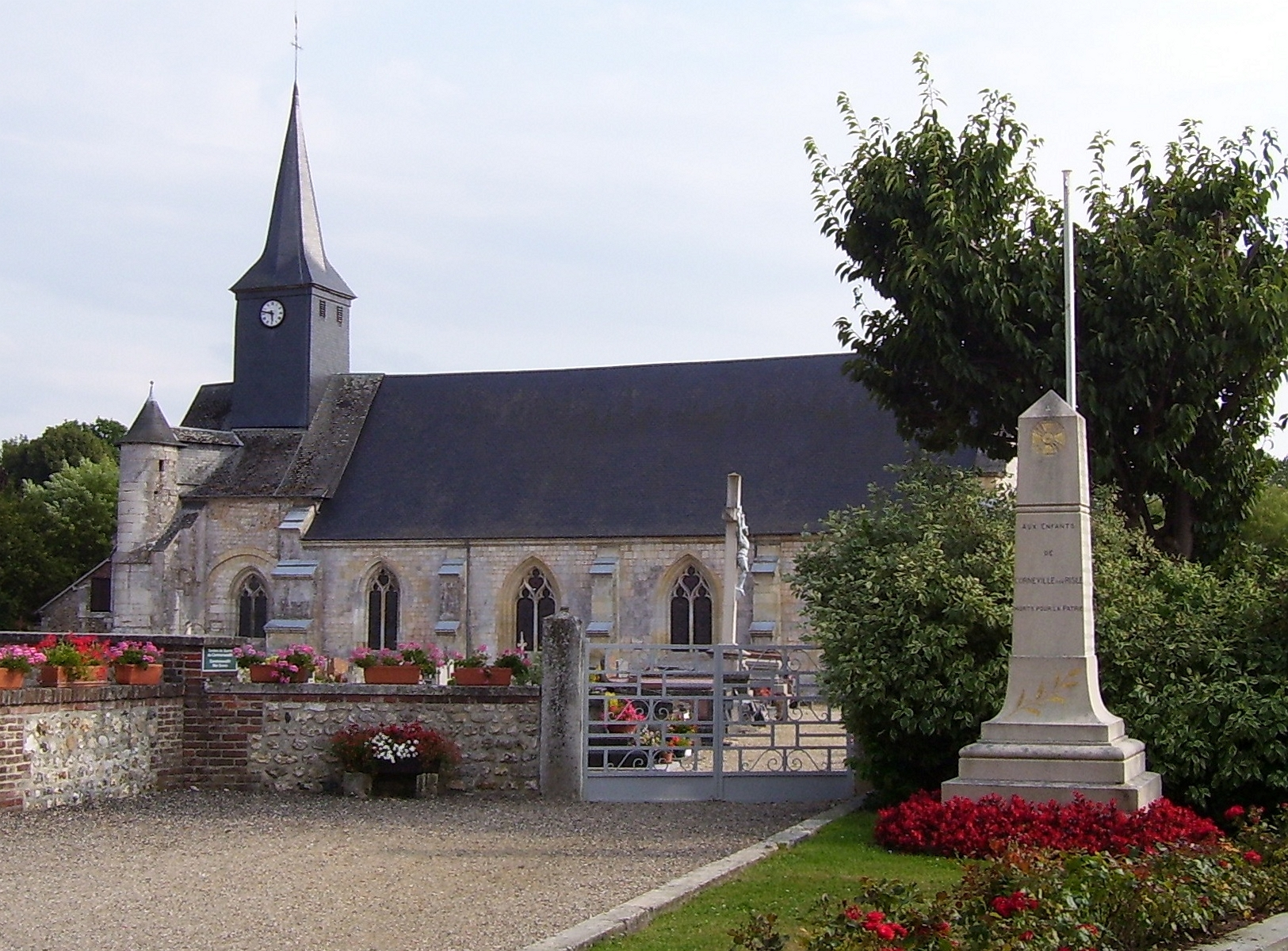
- Abbey church of Notre-Dame and war memorial

- Coat of arms
- Location of Corneville-sur-Risle
- Location within France Location within Normandy
- Coordinates: 49°20′16″N 0°35′43″E
- Country: France
- Region: Normandy
- Department: Eure
- Arrondissement: Bernay
- Canton: Pont-Audemer

Government
  - Mayor (2020–2026): Benoît Bouet
- Area^{1}: 13.23 km^{2} (5.11 sq mi)
- Elevation: 21 m (69 ft)
- Highest elevation: 131 m (430 ft)
- Lowest elevation: 12 m (39 ft)
- Population (2023): 1,379
  - Density: 104.2/km^{2} (270.0/sq mi)
- Time zone: UTC+01:00 (CET)
  - Summer (DST): UTC+02:00 (CEST)
- INSEE/Postal code: 27174 /27500
- ^{1} French Land Register data, which excludes lakes, ponds, glaciers > 1 km^{2} (0.386 sq mi or 247 acres) and river estuaries.

Corneville-sur-Risle (French pronunciation: [kɔʁnəvil syʁ ʁil], literally Corneville on Risle) is a commune in the Eure department in northern France.

== Geography ==
The commune along with another 69 communes shares part of a 4,747 hectare, Natura 2000 conservation area, called Risle, Guiel, Charentonne.

== Population ==
Historical population
Year	Pop.	±% p.a.
1968	876	—
1975	959	+1.30%
1982	1,066	+1.52%
1990	1,163	+1.09%
1999	1,170	+0.07%
2007	1,211	+0.43%
2012	1,289	+1.26%
2017	1,357	+1.03%
2023	1,379	+0.27%
Source: INSEE

== See also ==
- Communes of the Eure department
