= Selles, Eure =

Selles
- Commune
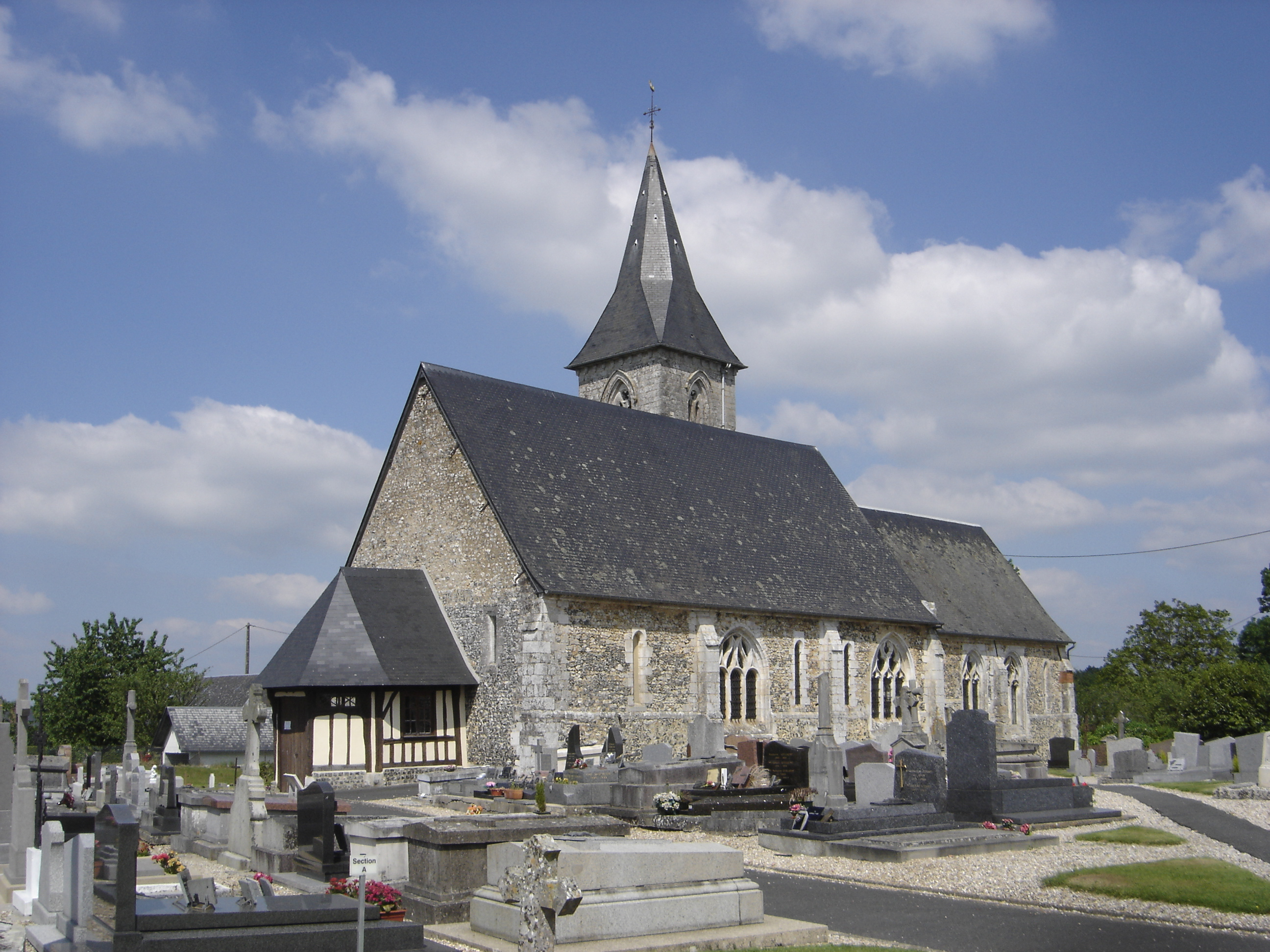
- The church in Selles
- Location of Selles
- Location within France Location within Normandy
- Coordinates: 49°18′09″N 0°30′25″E
- Country: France
- Region: Normandy
- Department: Eure
- Arrondissement: Bernay
- Canton: Pont-Audemer

Government
  - Mayor (2020–2026): Gérard Platel
- Area^{1}: 10.09 km^{2} (3.90 sq mi)
- Elevation: 150 m (490 ft)
- Highest elevation: 146 m (479 ft)
- Lowest elevation: 58 m (190 ft)
- Population (2023): 480
  - Density: 48/km^{2} (120/sq mi)
- Time zone: UTC+01:00 (CET)
  - Summer (DST): UTC+02:00 (CEST)
- INSEE/Postal code: 27620 /27500
- ^{1} French Land Register data, which excludes lakes, ponds, glaciers > 1 km^{2} (0.386 sq mi or 247 acres) and river estuaries.

Selles (French pronunciation: [sɛl]) is a commune in the Eure department in Normandy in northern France.

== Geography ==
The commune along with another 69 communes shares part of a 4,747 hectare, Natura 2000 conservation area, called Risle, Guiel, Charentonne.

== Population ==
Historical population
| Year | Pop. | ±% p.a. |
|---|---|---|
| 1968 | 401 | — |
| 1975 | 381 | −0.73% |
| 1982 | 352 | −1.12% |
| 1990 | 367 | +0.52% |
| 1999 | 396 | +0.85% |
| 2007 | 423 | +0.83% |
| 2012 | 451 | +1.29% |
| 2017 | 469 | +0.79% |
| 2023 | 480 | +0.39% |
Source: INSEE

== See also ==
- Communes of the Eure department
