= Colletot =

- Commune
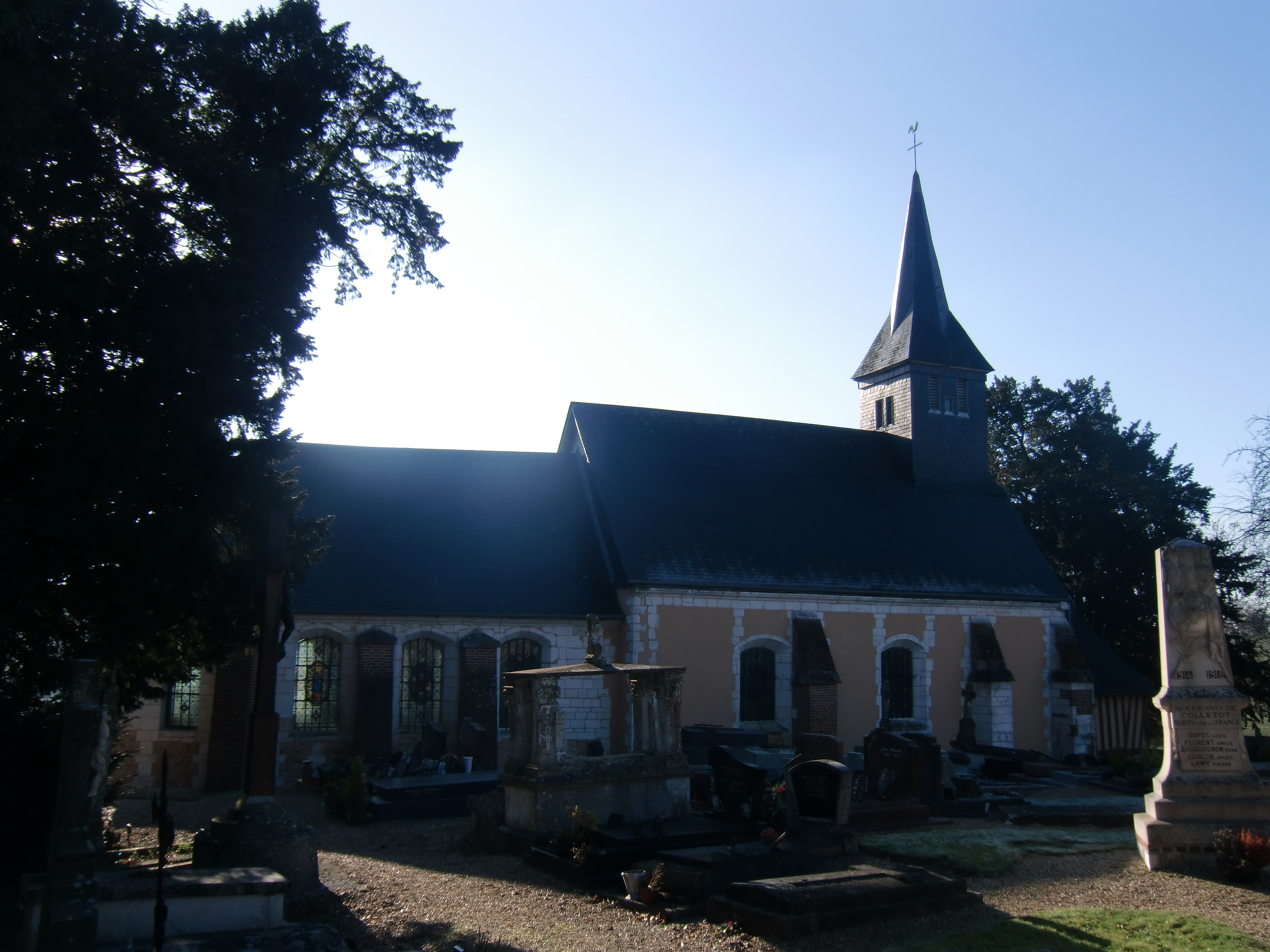
- The church in Colletot
- Location of Colletot
- Location within France Location within Normandy
- Coordinates: 49°21′03″N 0°37′11″E
- Country: France
- Region: Normandy
- Department: Eure
- Arrondissement: Bernay
- Canton: Pont-Audemer
- Intercommunality: Pont-Audemer / Val de Risle

Government
  - Mayor (2020–2026): Odile Gilbert
- Area^{1}: 4.32 km^{2} (1.67 sq mi)
- Elevation: 96 m (315 ft)
- Highest elevation: 134 m (440 ft)
- Lowest elevation: 60 m (200 ft)
- Population (2023): 177
  - Density: 41.0/km^{2} (106/sq mi)
- Time zone: UTC+01:00 (CET)
  - Summer (DST): UTC+02:00 (CEST)
- INSEE/Postal code: 27163 /27500
- ^{1} French Land Register data, which excludes lakes, ponds, glaciers > 1 km^{2} (0.386 sq mi or 247 acres) and river estuaries.

Colletot (French pronunciation: [kɔlto]) is a commune in the Eure department in northern France.

== Population ==
Historical population
Year	Pop.	±% p.a.
1968	88	—
1975	88	+0.00%
1982	94	+0.95%
1990	104	+1.27%
1999	110	+0.63%
2007	150	+3.95%
2012	186	+4.40%
2017	202	+1.66%
2023	177	−2.18%
Source: INSEE

== See also ==
- Communes of the Eure department
