= Écaquelon =

- Commune
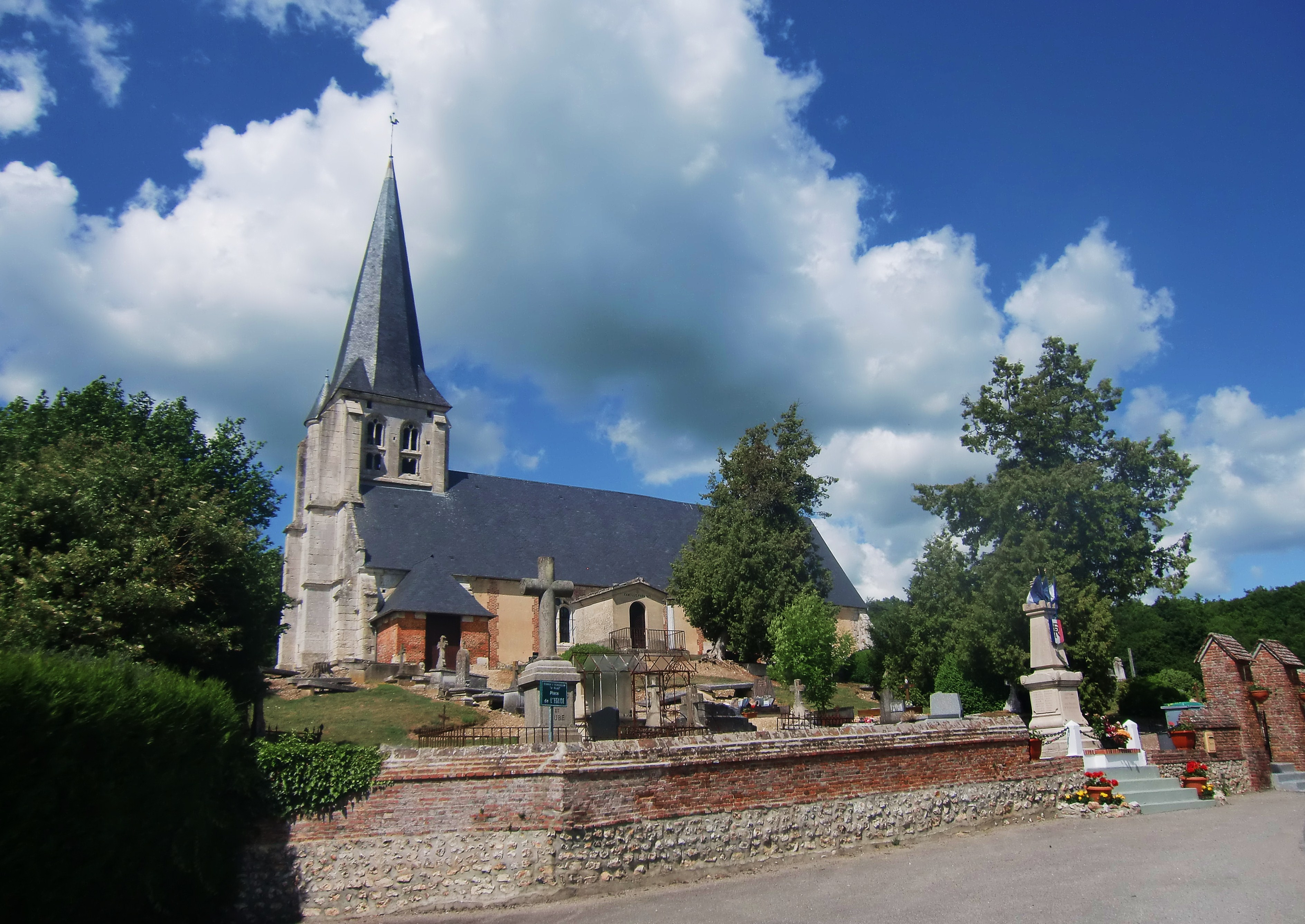
- St. James' Church
- Location of Écaquelon
- Location within France Location within Normandy
- Coordinates: 49°17′31″N 0°43′35″E
- Country: France
- Region: Normandy
- Department: Eure
- Arrondissement: Bernay
- Canton: Pont-Audemer

Government
  - Mayor (2020–2026): Jean-François Dumesnil
- Area^{1}: 13.04 km^{2} (5.03 sq mi)
- Elevation: 127 m (417 ft)
- Highest elevation: 144 m (472 ft)
- Lowest elevation: 47 m (154 ft)
- Population (2023): 607
  - Density: 46.5/km^{2} (121/sq mi)
- Time zone: UTC+01:00 (CET)
  - Summer (DST): UTC+02:00 (CEST)
- INSEE/Postal code: 27209 /27290
- ^{1} French Land Register data, which excludes lakes, ponds, glaciers > 1 km^{2} (0.386 sq mi or 247 acres) and river estuaries.

Écaquelon (French pronunciation: [ekaklɔ̃]) is a commune in the Eure department in northern France.

== Population ==
Historical population
Year	Pop.	±% p.a.
1968	372	—
1975	300	−3.03%
1982	357	+2.52%
1990	426	+2.23%
1999	428	+0.05%
2007	466	+1.07%
2012	561	+3.78%
2017	613	+1.79%
2023	607	−0.16%
Source: INSEE

== See also ==
- Communes of the Eure department
