= Saint-Mards-de-Blacarville =

- Commune
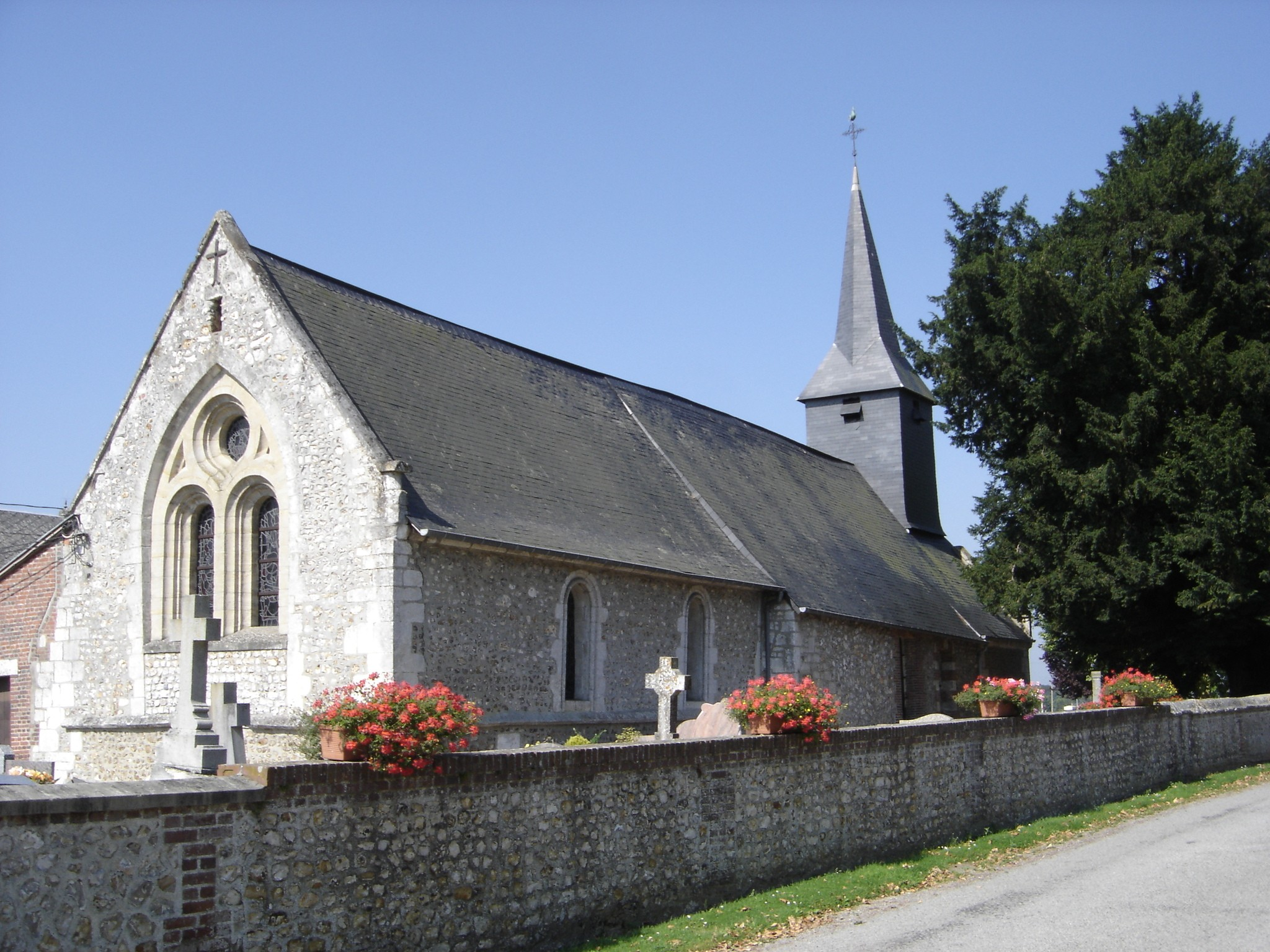
- The church in Saint-Mards-de-Blacarville

- Coat of arms
- Location of Saint-Mards-de-Blacarville
- Location within France Location within Normandy
- Coordinates: 49°22′45″N 0°30′52″E
- Country: France
- Region: Normandy
- Department: Eure
- Arrondissement: Bernay
- Canton: Pont-Audemer

Government
  - Mayor (2020–2026): Didier Swertvaeger
- Area^{1}: 8.78 km^{2} (3.39 sq mi)
- Elevation: 137 m (449 ft)
- Highest elevation: 130 m (430 ft)
- Lowest elevation: 2 m (6.6 ft)
- Population (2023): 877
  - Density: 99.9/km^{2} (259/sq mi)
- Time zone: UTC+01:00 (CET)
  - Summer (DST): UTC+02:00 (CEST)
- INSEE/Postal code: 27563 /27500
- ^{1} French Land Register data, which excludes lakes, ponds, glaciers > 1 km^{2} (0.386 sq mi or 247 acres) and river estuaries.

Saint-Mards-de-Blacarville (French pronunciation: [sɛ̃ maʁ də blakaʁvil]) is a commune in the Eure department in Normandy in northern France.

== Geography ==
The commune along with another 69 communes shares part of a 4,747 hectare, Natura 2000 conservation area, called Risle, Guiel, Charentonne.

== Population ==
Historical population
Year	Pop.	±% p.a.
1968	535	—
1975	644	+2.68%
1982	725	+1.71%
1990	796	+1.17%
1999	756	−0.57%
2007	752	−0.07%
2012	780	+0.73%
2017	801	+0.53%
2023	877	+1.52%
Source: INSEE

== See also ==
- Communes of the Eure department
