= Bonneville-Aptot =

- Commune
- Location of Bonneville-Aptot
- Location within France Location within Normandy
- Coordinates: 49°15′32″N 0°45′49″E
- Country: France
- Region: Normandy
- Department: Eure
- Arrondissement: Bernay
- Canton: Pont-Audemer

Government
  - Mayor (2021–2026): Fabrice Girard
- Area^{1}: 7.47 km^{2} (2.88 sq mi)
- Elevation: 150 m (490 ft)
- Highest elevation: 154 m (505 ft)
- Lowest elevation: 100 m (330 ft)
- Population (2023): 260
  - Density: 35/km^{2} (90/sq mi)
- Time zone: UTC+01:00 (CET)
  - Summer (DST): UTC+02:00 (CEST)
- INSEE/Postal code: 27083 /27290
- ^{1} French Land Register data, which excludes lakes, ponds, glaciers > 1 km^{2} (0.386 sq mi or 247 acres) and river estuaries.

Bonneville-Aptot (French pronunciation: [bɔnvil apto]) is a commune in the Eure department in Normandy in northern France.

== Population ==
Historical population
Year	Pop.	±% p.a.
1968	180	—
1975	149	−2.66%
1982	188	+3.38%
1990	161	−1.92%
1999	169	+0.54%
2007	212	+2.87%
2012	236	+2.17%
2017	257	+1.72%
2023	260	+0.19%
Source: INSEE

== See also ==
- Communes of the Eure department
