= Brestot =

- Commune
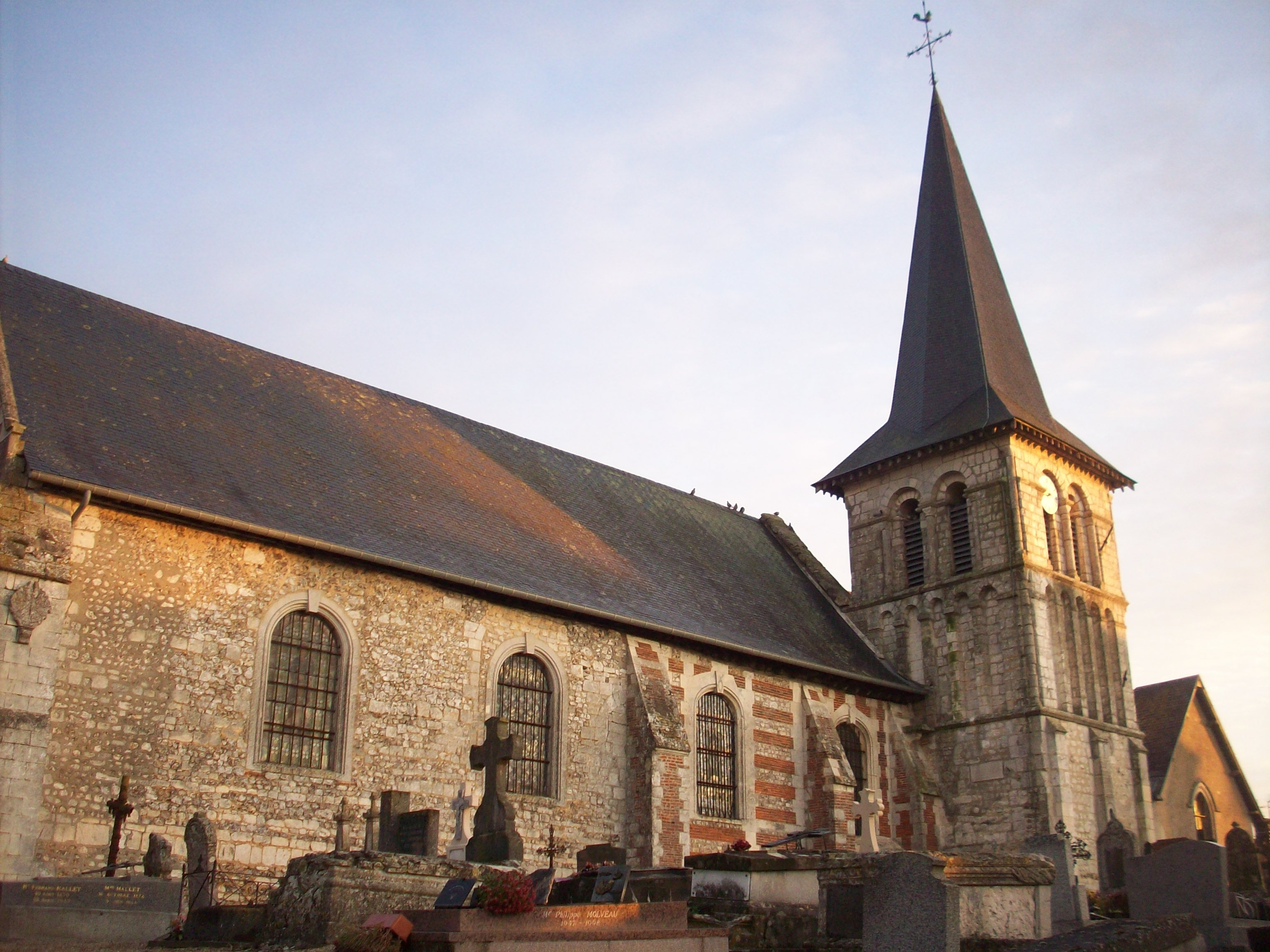
- The church in Brestot

- Coat of arms
- Location of Brestot
- Location within France Location within Normandy
- Coordinates: 49°21′09″N 0°41′10″E
- Country: France
- Region: Normandy
- Department: Eure
- Arrondissement: Bernay
- Canton: Pont-Audemer

Government
  - Mayor (2020–2026): Emilie Da Silva
- Area^{1}: 8.73 km^{2} (3.37 sq mi)
- Elevation: 103 m (338 ft)
- Highest elevation: 139 m (456 ft)
- Lowest elevation: 50 m (160 ft)
- Population (2023): 628
  - Density: 71.9/km^{2} (186/sq mi)
- Time zone: UTC+01:00 (CET)
  - Summer (DST): UTC+02:00 (CEST)
- INSEE/Postal code: 27110 /27350
- ^{1} French Land Register data, which excludes lakes, ponds, glaciers > 1 km^{2} (0.386 sq mi or 247 acres) and river estuaries.

Brestot is a commune in the Eure department in Normandy in northern France.

== Population ==
Historical population
Year	Pop.	±% p.a.
1968	267	—
1975	294	+1.39%
1982	337	+1.97%
1990	424	+2.91%
1999	404	−0.54%
2007	465	+1.77%
2012	501	+1.50%
2017	596	+3.53%
2023	628	+0.88%
Source: INSEE

== See also ==
- Communes of the Eure department
