= Pont-Audemer =

- Commune
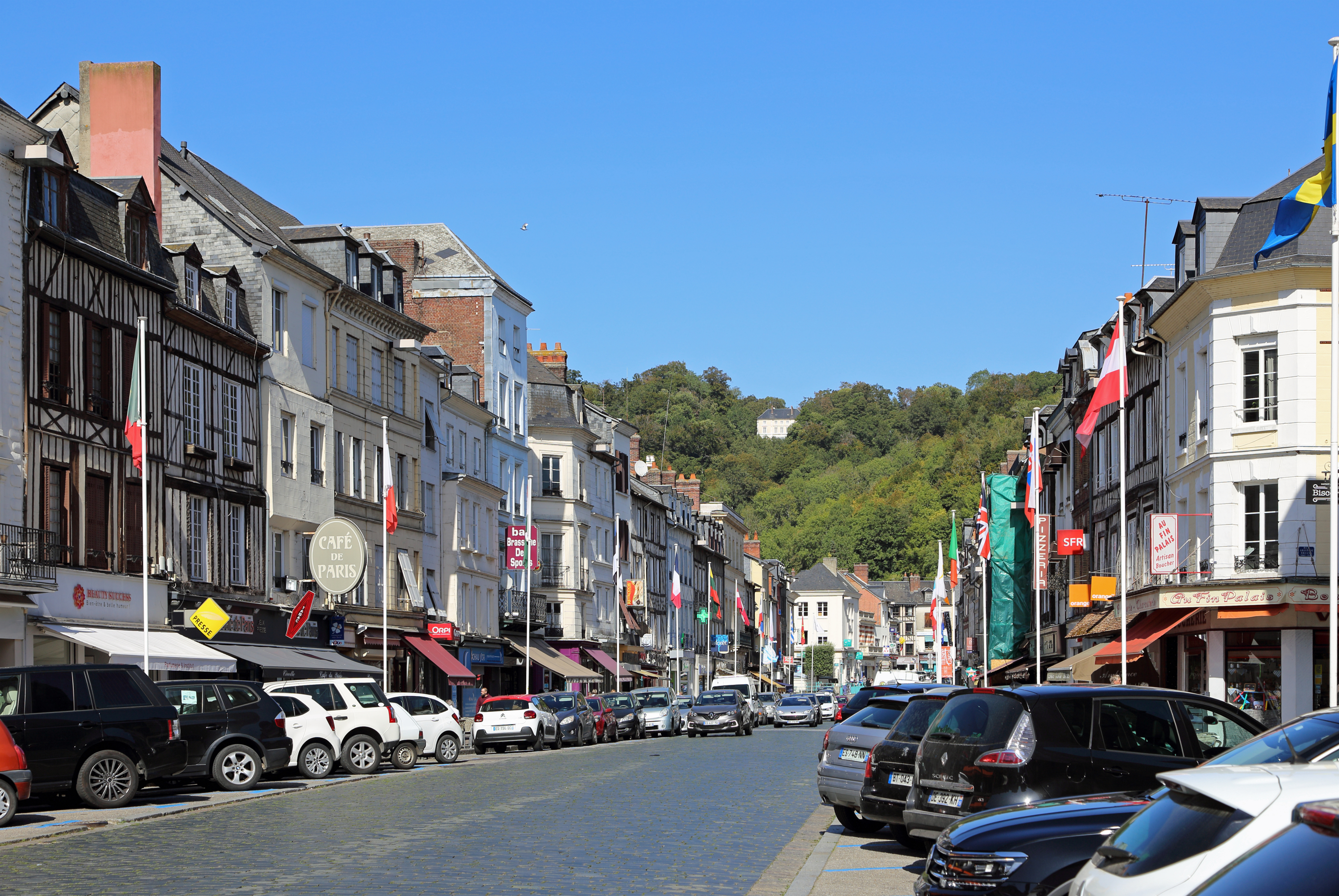
- Pont-Audemer: Rue de la République

- Coat of arms
- Location of Pont-Audemer
- Location within France Location within Normandy
- Coordinates: 49°21′23″N 00°30′56″E
- Country: France
- Region: Normandy
- Department: Eure
- Arrondissement: Bernay
- Canton: Pont-Audemer
- Intercommunality: Pont-Audemer / Val de Risle

Government
  - Mayor (2022–2026): Alexis Darmois
- Area^{1}: 14.66 km^{2} (5.66 sq mi)
- Elevation: 9 m (30 ft)
- Highest elevation: 115 m (377 ft)
- Lowest elevation: 2 m (6.6 ft)
- Population (2023): 10,023
  - Density: 683.7/km^{2} (1,771/sq mi)
- Time zone: UTC+01:00 (CET)
  - Summer (DST): UTC+02:00 (CEST)
- INSEE/Postal code: 27467 /27500
- ^{1} French Land Register data, which excludes lakes, ponds, glaciers > 1 km^{2} (0.386 sq mi or 247 acres) and river estuaries.

Pont-Audemer (French pronunciation: [pɔ̃.t‿odmɛʁ]) is a commune in the Eure department in the Normandy region in northern France. On 1 January 2018, the former commune of Saint-Germain-Village was merged into Pont-Audemer.

== Geography ==
The commune is situated on the river Risle, 13 km upstream from its outflow into the Seine. It lies on the border between the regions Roumois and Lieuvin.

The commune along with another 69 communes shares part of a 4,747 hectare, Natura 2000 conservation area, called Risle, Guiel, Charentonne.

== Population ==
The population data in the table below refer to the commune of Pont-Audemer proper, in its geography at the given years. The commune of Pont-Audemer absorbed part of the former commune of Saint-Aignan in 1835, Saint-Paul-sur-Risle in 1963 and Saint-Germain-Village in 2018.

Historical population

Year	Pop.	±% p.a.
1793	4,599	—
1800	5,207	+1.79%
1806	5,386	+0.56%
1821	5,426	+0.05%
1831	5,305	−0.23%
1836	5,358	+0.20%
1841	5,497	+0.51%
1846	5,733	+0.84%
1851	6,310	+1.94%
1856	6,106	−0.66%
1861	6,136	+0.10%
1866	6,182	+0.15%
1872	6,124	−0.16%
1876	5,942	−0.75%
1881	6,168	+0.75%
1886	6,163	−0.02%
1891	6,084	−0.26%
1896	6,012	−0.24%
1901	5,908	−0.35%

Year	Pop.	±% p.a.
1906	6,111	+0.68%
1911	6,123	+0.04%
1921	5,946	−0.29%
1926	5,953	+0.02%
1931	5,860	−0.31%
1936	6,279	+1.39%
1946	6,119	−0.26%
1954	6,724	+1.19%
1962	8,206	+2.52%
1968	8,969	+1.49%
1975	9,586	+0.95%
1982	9,750	+0.24%
1990	8,975	−1.03%
1999	8,981	+0.01%
2007	8,718	−0.37%
2012	9,011	+0.66%
2017	8,552	−1.04%
2023	10,023	+2.68%

Source: EHESS and INSEE (2007-2023)

== Sights ==
The commune was spared substantial damage to its historic buildings during the Battle of Normandy. Nowadays the half-timbered buildings and the canals running between them are a tourist attraction. The church of Saint-Ouen is noted for its Renaissance stained glass.

== Personalities ==
- Laetitia Casta, supermodel, was born there in 1978.
- Delphine Philippe-Lemaître, 19th-century historian, archaeologist
- Hervé Morin, politician, former French Minister of Defence was born there in 1961.
- Alexis Vastine, boxer, was born there in 1986.

== Transport ==
Pont-Audemer has a railway station, Gare de Pont-Audemer, but passenger services were ceased in 1969. The station is served by TER Haute-Normandie buses. PontAuRail, a heritage railway association, ran two Diesel multiple units (a X4500 and a X2400) from Pont-Audemer to Honfleur between 1995 and 2006.

== Administration ==
Until 1926, Pont-Audemer was a sub-prefecture of the Eure department.

== Media ==
The city is evoked in a poem of Paul Verlaine called "The Apollo of Pont-Audemer." The area is included in Ted Fahrenwald's book "Bailout Over Normandy: A Flyboy's Adventures" as the site where he met Riri, his sweetheart.

== Twin towns and sister cities ==
Pont-Audemer is twinned with:

- Ringwood in England
- Veghel in the Netherlands

== Gallery ==
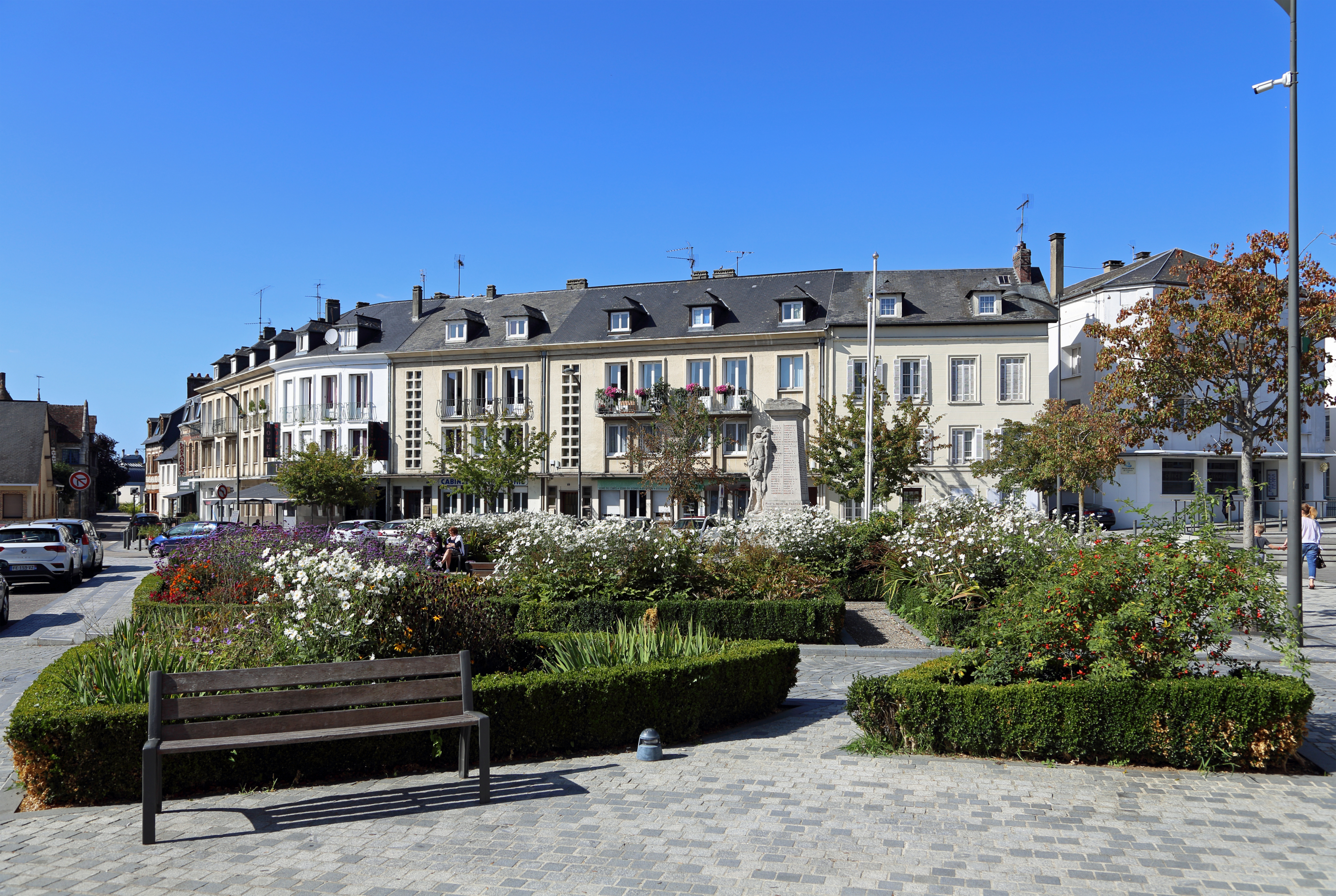
Place Louis Gillain

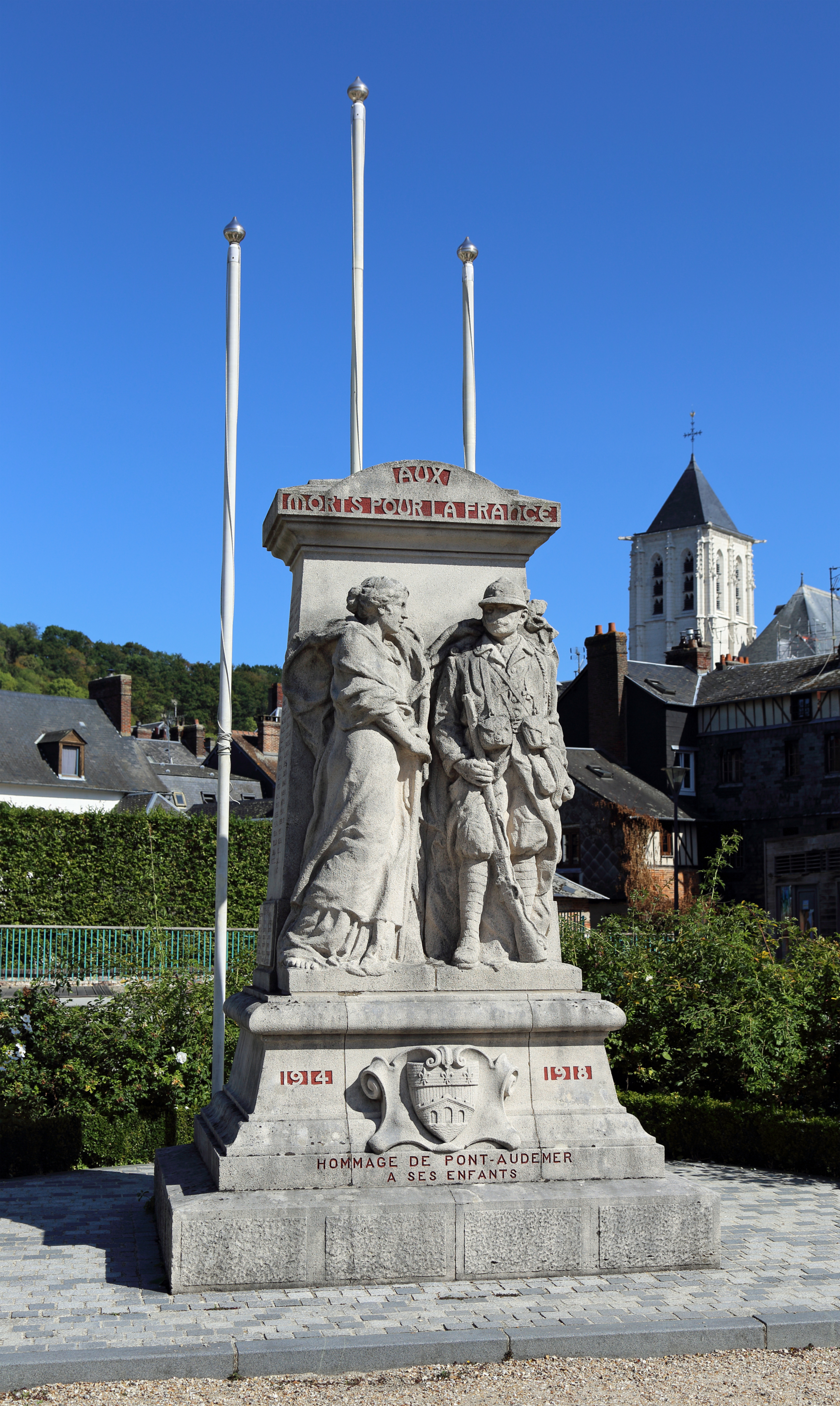
War memorial

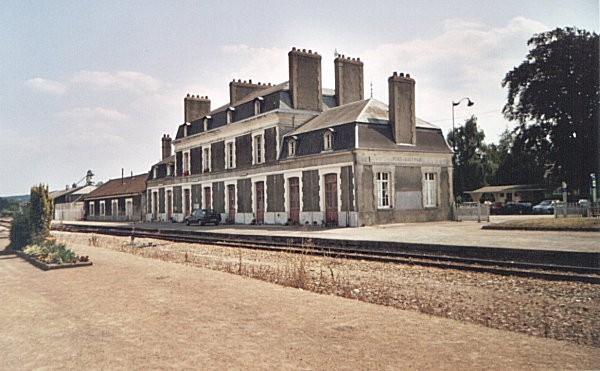
Train station

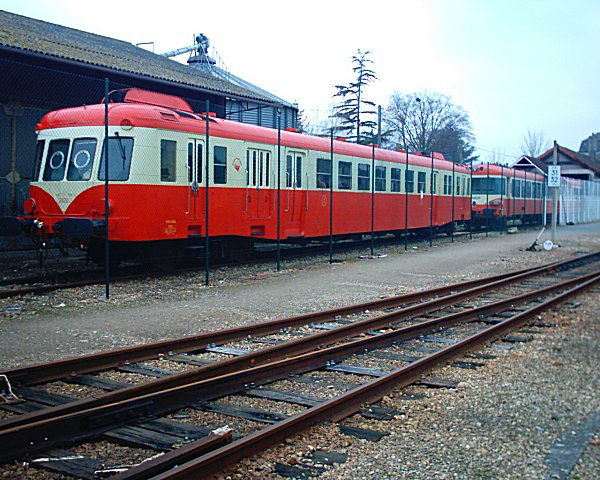
The X2426 at Pont-Audemer Station

== See also ==
- Communes of the Eure department
