= Montfort-sur-Risle =

- Commune
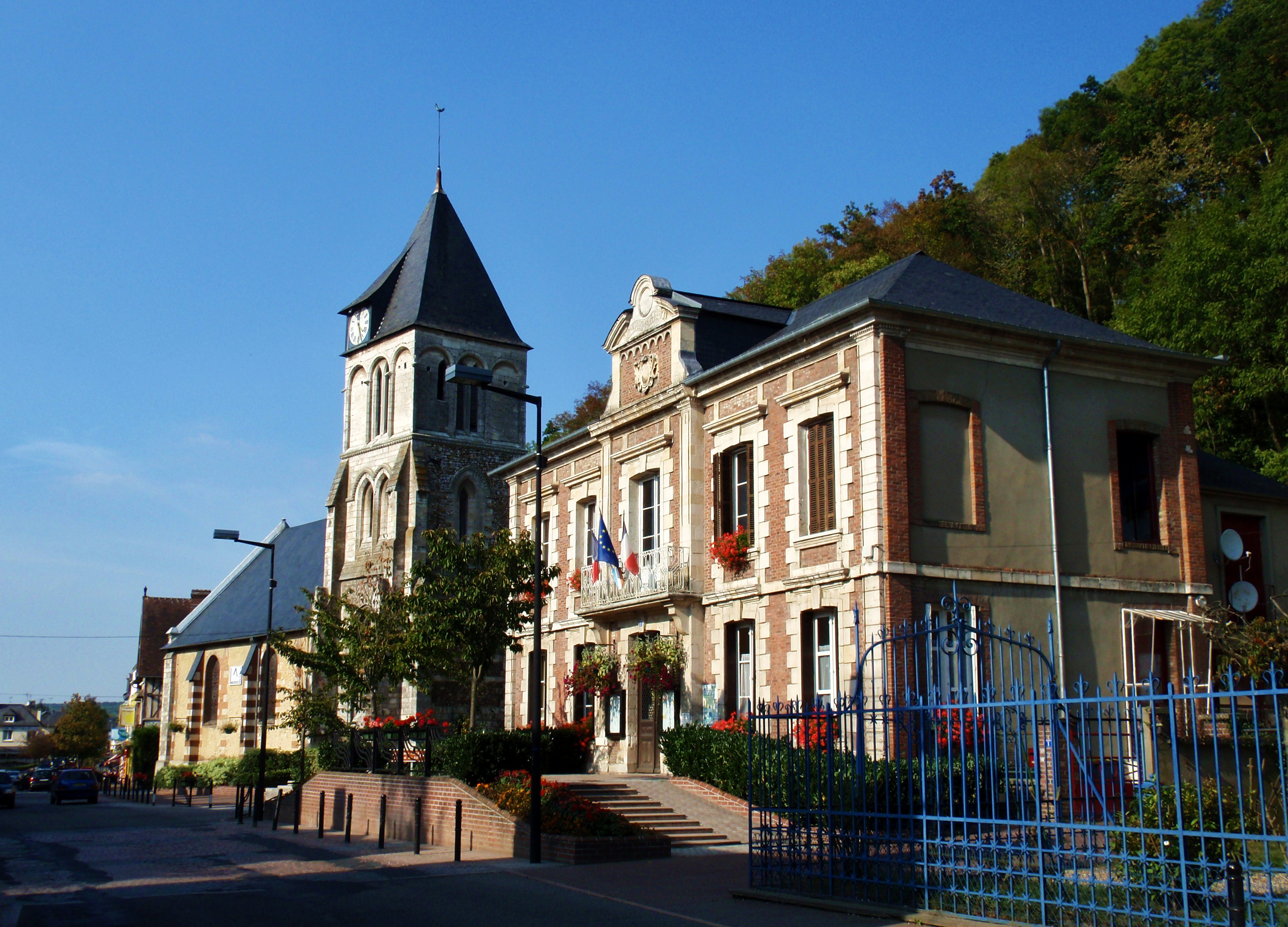
- The town hall and church in Montfort-sur-Risle

- Coat of arms
- Location of Montfort-sur-Risle
- Location within France Location within Normandy
- Coordinates: 49°17′46″N 0°39′56″E
- Country: France
- Region: Normandy
- Department: Eure
- Arrondissement: Bernay
- Canton: Pont-Audemer

Government
  - Mayor (2021–2026): Jean-Luc Barre
- Area^{1}: 3.94 km^{2} (1.52 sq mi)
- Highest elevation: 102 m (335 ft)
- Lowest elevation: 27 m (89 ft)
- Population (2023): 768
  - Density: 195/km^{2} (505/sq mi)
- Time zone: UTC+01:00 (CET)
  - Summer (DST): UTC+02:00 (CEST)
- INSEE/Postal code: 27413 /27290
- ^{1} French Land Register data, which excludes lakes, ponds, glaciers > 1 km^{2} (0.386 sq mi or 247 acres) and river estuaries.

Montfort-sur-Risle (French pronunciation: [mɔ̃fɔʁ syʁ ʁil], literally Montfort on Risle) is a commune in the Eure department in Normandy region in northern France.

== History ==
In Gallic times the river Risle delimited the territories of the tribes of Veliocasses and the Lexovii. Between 980 and 1204, when it passed into the hands of the King of France with its castle, Montfort-sur-Risle was a lordship. The most famous Lord of Montfort was Hugues II de Montfort (died 1083), who joined in the Norman conquest of England, for which he received 114 English manors.

== Geography ==
The commune along with another 69 communes shares part of a 4,747 hectare, Natura 2000 conservation area, called Risle, Guiel, Charentonne.

== Population ==
Historical population
Year	Pop.	±% p.a.
1968	766	—
1975	867	+1.79%
1982	885	+0.29%
1990	913	+0.39%
1999	882	−0.38%
2007	839	−0.62%
2012	774	−1.60%
2017	761	−0.34%
2023	768	+0.15%
Source: INSEE

== See also ==
- Communes of the Eure department
