= Saint-Philbert-sur-Risle =

- Commune
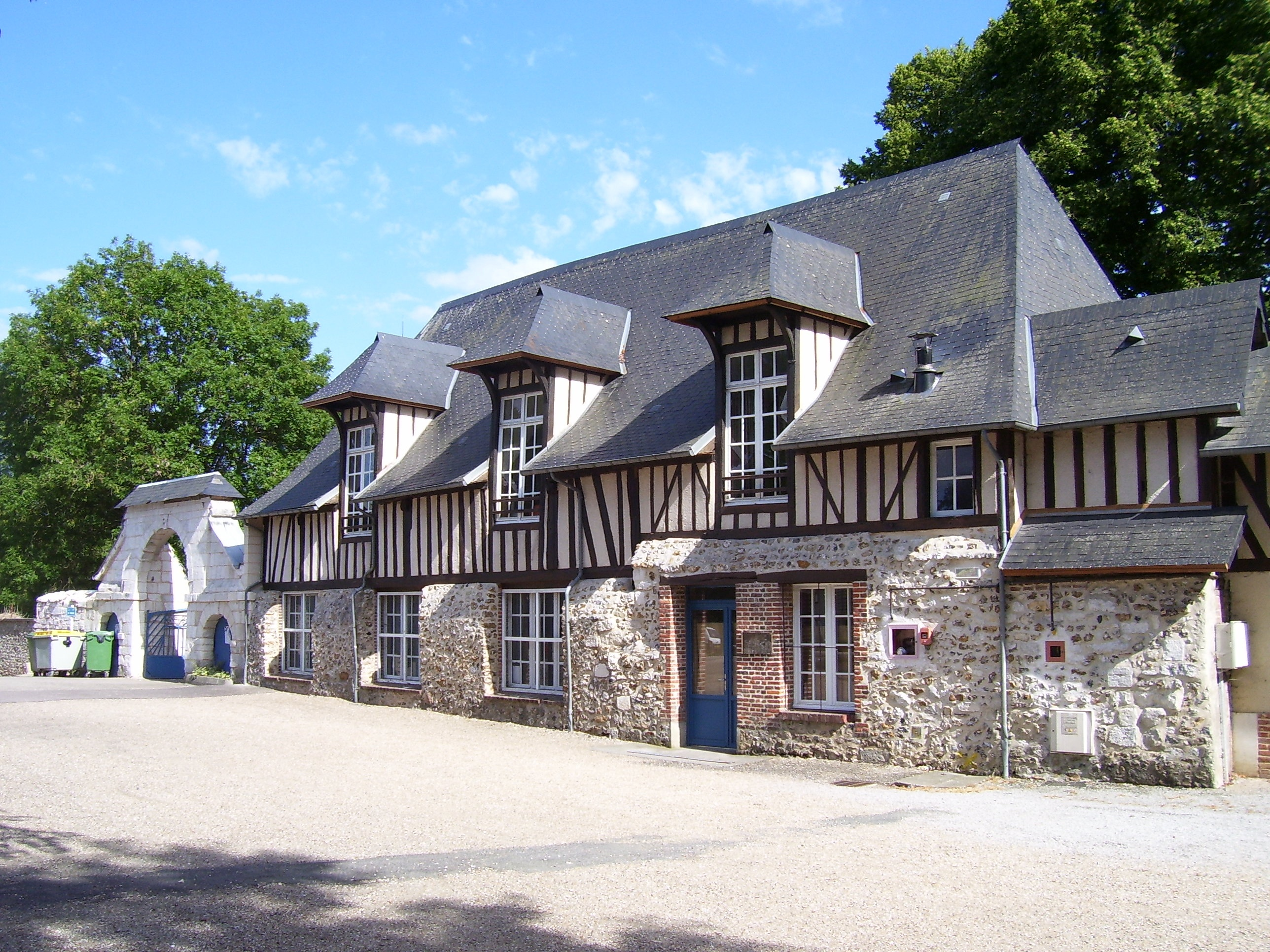
- Old priory
- Location of Saint-Philbert-sur-Risle
- Location within France Location within Normandy
- Coordinates: 49°17′45″N 0°39′02″E
- Country: France
- Region: Normandy
- Department: Eure
- Arrondissement: Bernay
- Canton: Pont-Audemer

Government
  - Mayor (2020–2026): Francis Courel
- Area^{1}: 13.15 km^{2} (5.08 sq mi)
- Elevation: 32 m (105 ft)
- Highest elevation: 149 m (489 ft)
- Lowest elevation: 26 m (85 ft)
- Population (2023): 840
  - Density: 64/km^{2} (170/sq mi)
- Time zone: UTC+01:00 (CET)
  - Summer (DST): UTC+02:00 (CEST)
- INSEE/Postal code: 27587 /27290
- ^{1} French Land Register data, which excludes lakes, ponds, glaciers > 1 km^{2} (0.386 sq mi or 247 acres) and river estuaries.

Saint-Philbert-sur-Risle (French pronunciation: [sɛ̃ filbɛʁ syʁ ʁil], literally Saint-Philbert on Risle) is a commune in the Eure department in Normandy in northern France.

== Geography ==
The commune along with another 69 communes shares part of a 4,747 hectare, Natura 2000 conservation area, called Risle, Guiel, Charentonne.

== Population ==
Historical population
Year	Pop.	±% p.a.
1968	843	—
1975	819	−0.41%
1982	733	−1.57%
1990	756	+0.39%
1999	796	+0.57%
2007	792	−0.06%
2012	753	−1.00%
2017	787	+0.89%
2023	840	+1.09%
Source: INSEE

== See also ==
- Communes of the Eure department
