= Canton of Pont-Audemer =

Coordinates: 49°20′33″N 0°31′05″E

Pont-Audemer
- Canton
- Interactive map of Pont-Audemer
- Country: France
- Region: Normandy
- Department: Eure
- No. of communes: {{{nbcomm}}}
- Area: 236.56 km^{2} (91.34 sq mi)
- Population (2023): 27,684
  - Density: 117.03/km^{2} (303.10/sq mi)
- INSEE code: 2717

The Canton of Pont-Audemer is a canton of the Eure département, in France.

At the French canton reorganisation which came into effect in March 2015, the canton was expanded from 14 to 26 communes:

- Appeville-Annebault
- Authou
- Bonneville-Aptot
- Brestot
- Campigny
- Colletot
- Condé-sur-Risle
- Corneville-sur-Risle
- Écaquelon
- Freneuse-sur-Risle
- Glos-sur-Risle
- Illeville-sur-Montfort
- Manneville-sur-Risle
- Montfort-sur-Risle
- Le Perrey
- Pont-Audemer
- Pont-Authou
- Les Préaux
- Saint-Mards-de-Blacarville
- Saint-Philbert-sur-Risle
- Saint-Symphorien
- Selles
- Thierville
- Tourville-sur-Pont-Audemer
- Toutainville
- Triqueville
