= Freneuse-sur-Risle =

- Commune
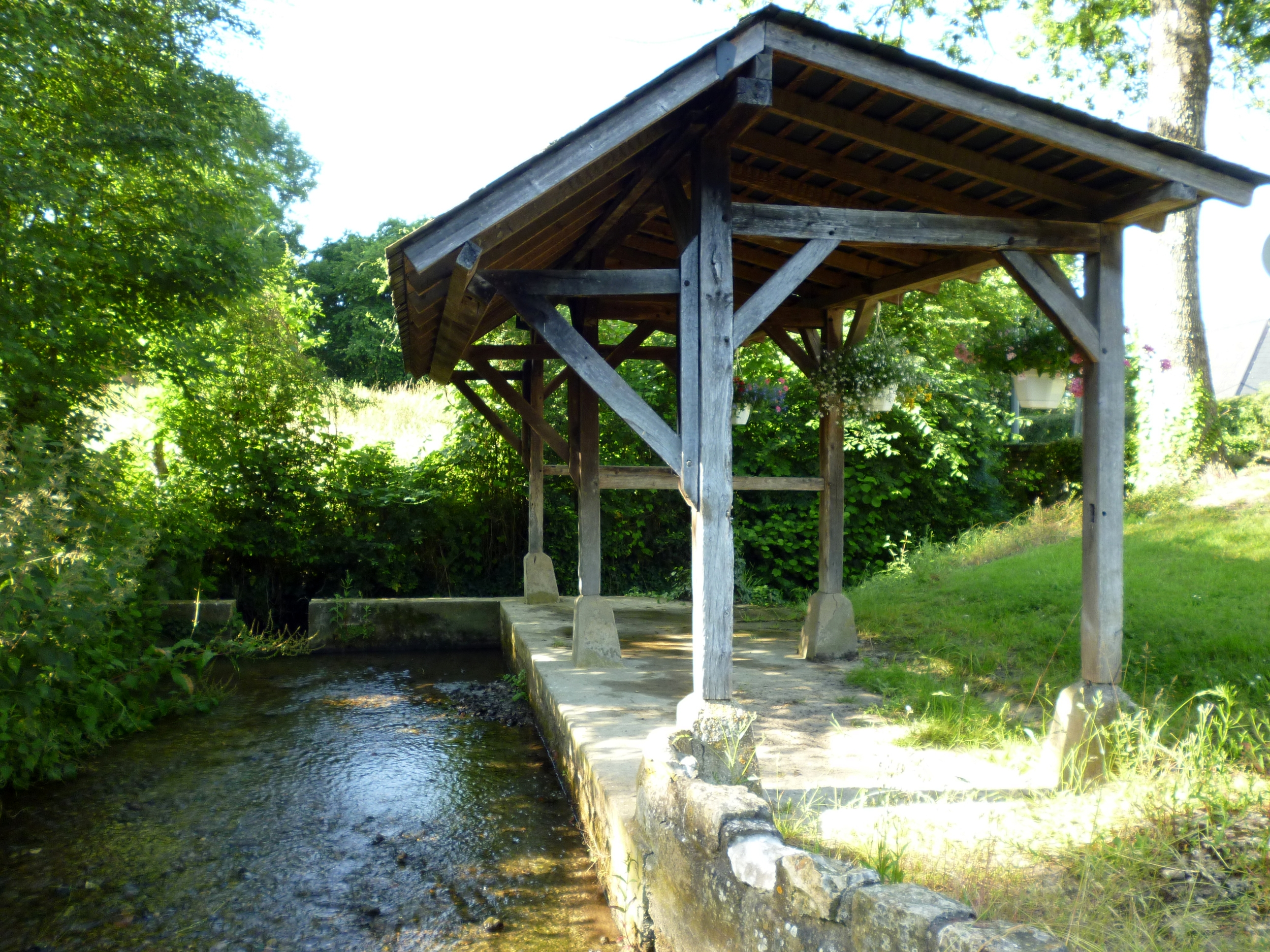
- The washhouse in Freneuse-sur-Risle

- Coat of arms
- Location of Freneuse-sur-Risle
- Location within France Location within Normandy
- Coordinates: 49°15′14″N 0°40′28″E
- Country: France
- Region: Normandy
- Department: Eure
- Arrondissement: Bernay
- Canton: Pont-Audemer

Government
  - Mayor (2020–2026): Patrice Bonvoisin
- Area^{1}: 8.13 km^{2} (3.14 sq mi)
- Elevation: 136 m (446 ft)
- Highest elevation: 155 m (509 ft)
- Lowest elevation: 35 m (115 ft)
- Population (2023): 331
  - Density: 40.7/km^{2} (105/sq mi)
- Time zone: UTC+01:00 (CET)
  - Summer (DST): UTC+02:00 (CEST)
- INSEE/Postal code: 27267 /27290
- ^{1} French Land Register data, which excludes lakes, ponds, glaciers > 1 km^{2} (0.386 sq mi or 247 acres) and river estuaries.

Freneuse-sur-Risle (French pronunciation: [fʁənøz syʁ ʁil], literally Freneuse on Risle) is a commune in the Eure department in the Normandy region in northern France.

== Geography ==
The commune along with another 69 communes shares part of a 4,747 hectare, Natura 2000 conservation area, called Risle, Guiel, Charentonne.

== Population ==
Historical population
Year	Pop.	±% p.a.
1968	469	—
1975	406	−2.04%
1982	359	−1.74%
1990	347	−0.42%
1999	340	−0.23%
2007	337	−0.11%
2012	353	+0.93%
2017	360	+0.39%
2023	331	−1.39%
Source: INSEE

== See also ==
- Communes of the Eure department
