= Manneville =

Manneville may refer to:

- Colmesnil-Manneville, a commune in Normandy, France
- Manneville-ès-Plains, a commune in Normandy, France
- Manneville-la-Goupil, a commune in Normandy, France
- Manneville-la-Pipard, a commune in Normandy, France
- Manneville-la-Raoult, a commune in Normandy, France
- Manneville-sur-Risle, a commune in Normandy, France
- Sainte-Gertrude-Manneville, a municipality in Quebec, Canada
- Saint-Pierre-de-Manneville, a commune in Normandy, France
- Thil-Manneville, a commune in Normandy, France
