= Saint-Benoît =

Saint-Benoît is the name of several communities around the world.

== Canada ==
- Saint-Benoît-du-Lac, Quebec, a municipality in the province of Quebec
- Saint-Benoît-Labre, Quebec, a municipality in the province of Quebec

== France ==
- Saint-Benoît, Ain, in the Ain département
- Saint-Benoît, Alpes-de-Haute-Provence, in the Alpes-de-Haute-Provence département
- Saint-Benoît, Aude, in the Aude département
- Saint-Benoît, Vienne, in the Vienne département
- Saint-Benoît, Réunion, in the Réunion département
- Saint-Benoît-de-Carmaux, in the Tarn département
- Saint-Benoît-des-Ombres, in the Eure département
- Saint-Benoît-des-Ondes, in the Ille-et-Vilaine département
- Saint-Benoît-d'Hébertot, in the Calvados département
- Saint-Benoît-du-Sault, in the Indre département
- Saint-Benoit-en-Diois, in the Drôme département
- Saint-Benoît-la-Chipotte, in the Vosges département
- Saint-Benoît-la-Forêt, in the Indre-et-Loire département
- Saint-Benoît-sur-Loire, in the Loiret département
- Saint-Benoît-sur-Seine, in the Aube département
- Saint-Benoist-sur-Mer, in the Vendée département
- Saint-Benoist-sur-Vanne, in the Aube département
