= Fauguernon =

- Commune
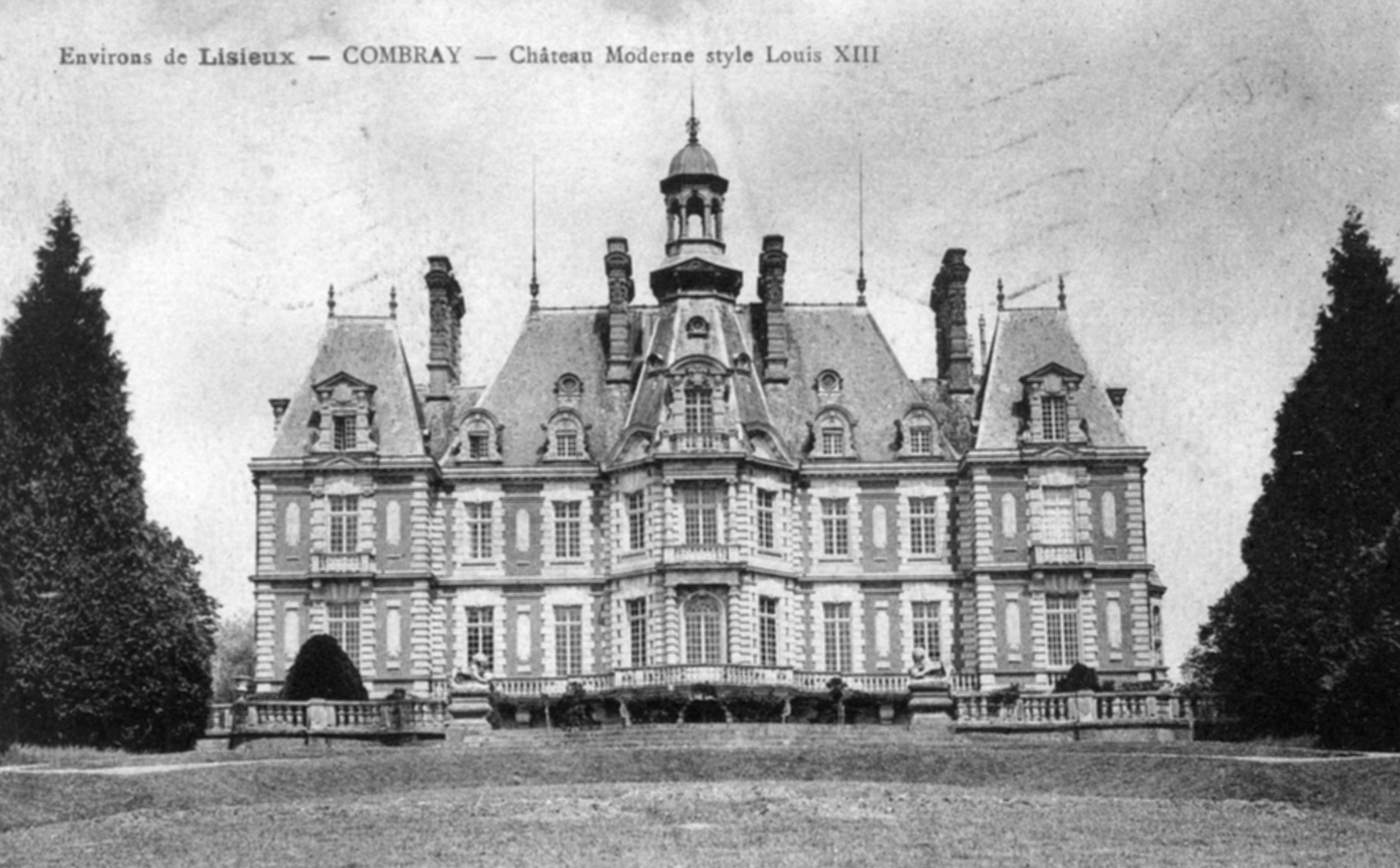
- The chateau in Combray, at the start of the 20th century

- Coat of arms
- Location of Fauguernon
- Location within France Location within Normandy
- Coordinates: 49°11′33″N 0°16′18″E
- Country: France
- Region: Normandy
- Department: Calvados
- Arrondissement: Lisieux
- Canton: Pont-l'Évêque
- Intercommunality: CA Lisieux Normandie

Government
  - Mayor (2020–2026): Patrick Flamand
- Area^{1}: 7.41 km^{2} (2.86 sq mi)
- Elevation: 150 m (490 ft)
- Highest elevation: 167 m (548 ft)
- Lowest elevation: 68 m (223 ft)
- Population (2023): 221
  - Density: 29.8/km^{2} (77.2/sq mi)
- Time zone: UTC+01:00 (CET)
  - Summer (DST): UTC+02:00 (CEST)
- INSEE/Postal code: 14260 /14100
- ^{1} French Land Register data, which excludes lakes, ponds, glaciers > 1 km^{2} (0.386 sq mi or 247 acres) and river estuaries.

Fauguernon (French pronunciation: [foɡɛʁnɔ̃]) is a commune in the Calvados department in the Normandy region in northwestern France.

== Population ==
Historical population
Year	Pop.	±% p.a.
1968	139	—
1975	162	+2.21%
1982	153	−0.81%
1990	200	+3.41%
1999	182	−1.04%
2007	242	+3.63%
2012	244	+0.16%
2017	246	+0.16%
2023	221	−1.77%
Source: INSEE

== See also ==
- Communes of the Calvados department
