= Pierrefitte-en-Auge =

- Commune
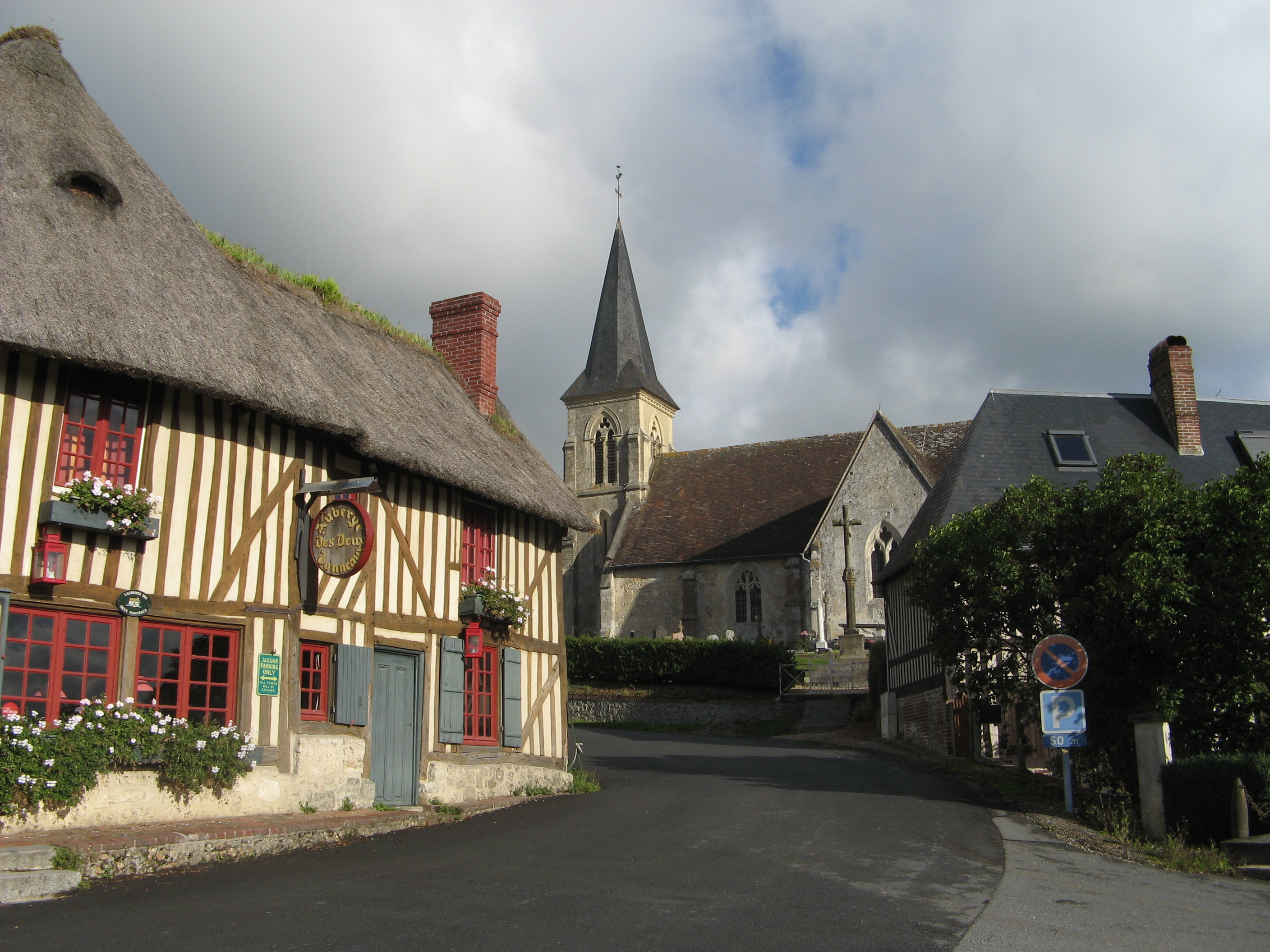
- The main road and church in Pierrefitte-en-Auge
- Location of Pierrefitte-en-Auge
- Location within France Location within Normandy
- Coordinates: 49°15′33″N 0°12′10″E
- Country: France
- Region: Normandy
- Department: Calvados
- Arrondissement: Lisieux
- Canton: Pont-l'Évêque
- Intercommunality: CC Terre d'Auge

Government
  - Mayor (2020–2026): Anne-Marie Samson
- Area^{1}: 5.48 km^{2} (2.12 sq mi)
- Elevation: 119 m (390 ft)
- Highest elevation: 136 m (446 ft)
- Lowest elevation: 11 m (36 ft)
- Population (2023): 152
  - Density: 27.7/km^{2} (71.8/sq mi)
- Time zone: UTC+01:00 (CET)
  - Summer (DST): UTC+02:00 (CEST)
- INSEE/Postal code: 14500 /14130
- ^{1} French Land Register data, which excludes lakes, ponds, glaciers > 1 km^{2} (0.386 sq mi or 247 acres) and river estuaries.

Pierrefitte-en-Auge (French pronunciation: [pjɛʁfit ɑ̃.n‿oʒ], literally Pierrefitte in Auge) is a commune in the Calvados department in the Normandy region in northwestern France.

== Population ==
Historical population
Year	Pop.	±% p.a.
1968	140	—
1975	158	+1.74%
1982	136	−2.12%
1990	122	−1.35%
1999	114	−0.75%
2007	146	+3.14%
2012	156	+1.33%
2017	159	+0.38%
2023	152	−0.75%
Source: INSEE

== See also ==
- Communes of the Calvados department
