= Firfol =

- Commune
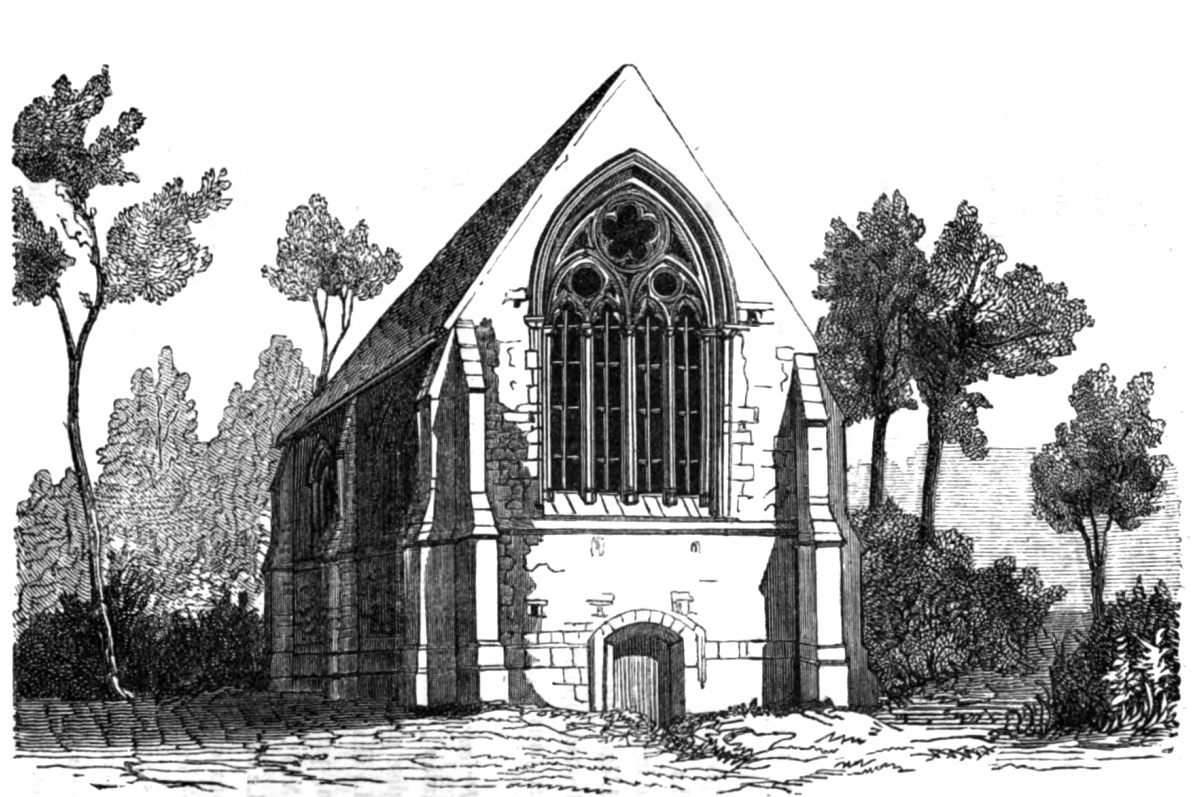
- The priory, drawn in 1867
- Location of Firfol
- Location within France Location within Normandy
- Coordinates: 49°09′17″N 0°19′17″E
- Country: France
- Region: Normandy
- Department: Calvados
- Arrondissement: Lisieux
- Canton: Pont-l'Évêque
- Intercommunality: CA Lisieux Normandie

Government
  - Mayor (2020–2026): Jean-Pierre Gallier
- Area^{1}: 5.01 km^{2} (1.93 sq mi)
- Elevation: 162 m (531 ft)
- Highest elevation: 162 m (531 ft)
- Lowest elevation: 97 m (318 ft)
- Population (2023): 366
  - Density: 73.1/km^{2} (189/sq mi)
- Time zone: UTC+01:00 (CET)
  - Summer (DST): UTC+02:00 (CEST)
- INSEE/Postal code: 14270 /14100
- ^{1} French Land Register data, which excludes lakes, ponds, glaciers > 1 km^{2} (0.386 sq mi or 247 acres) and river estuaries.

Firfol (French pronunciation: [fiʁfɔl]) is a commune in the Calvados department in the Normandy region in northwestern France.

== Population ==
Historical population
Year	Pop.	±% p.a.
1968	206	—
1975	281	+4.54%
1982	343	+2.89%
1990	382	+1.36%
1999	433	+1.40%
2007	428	−0.15%
2012	448	+0.92%
2017	414	−1.57%
2023	366	−2.03%
Source: INSEE

== See also ==
- Communes of the Calvados department
