= Bonneville-la-Louvet =

- Commune
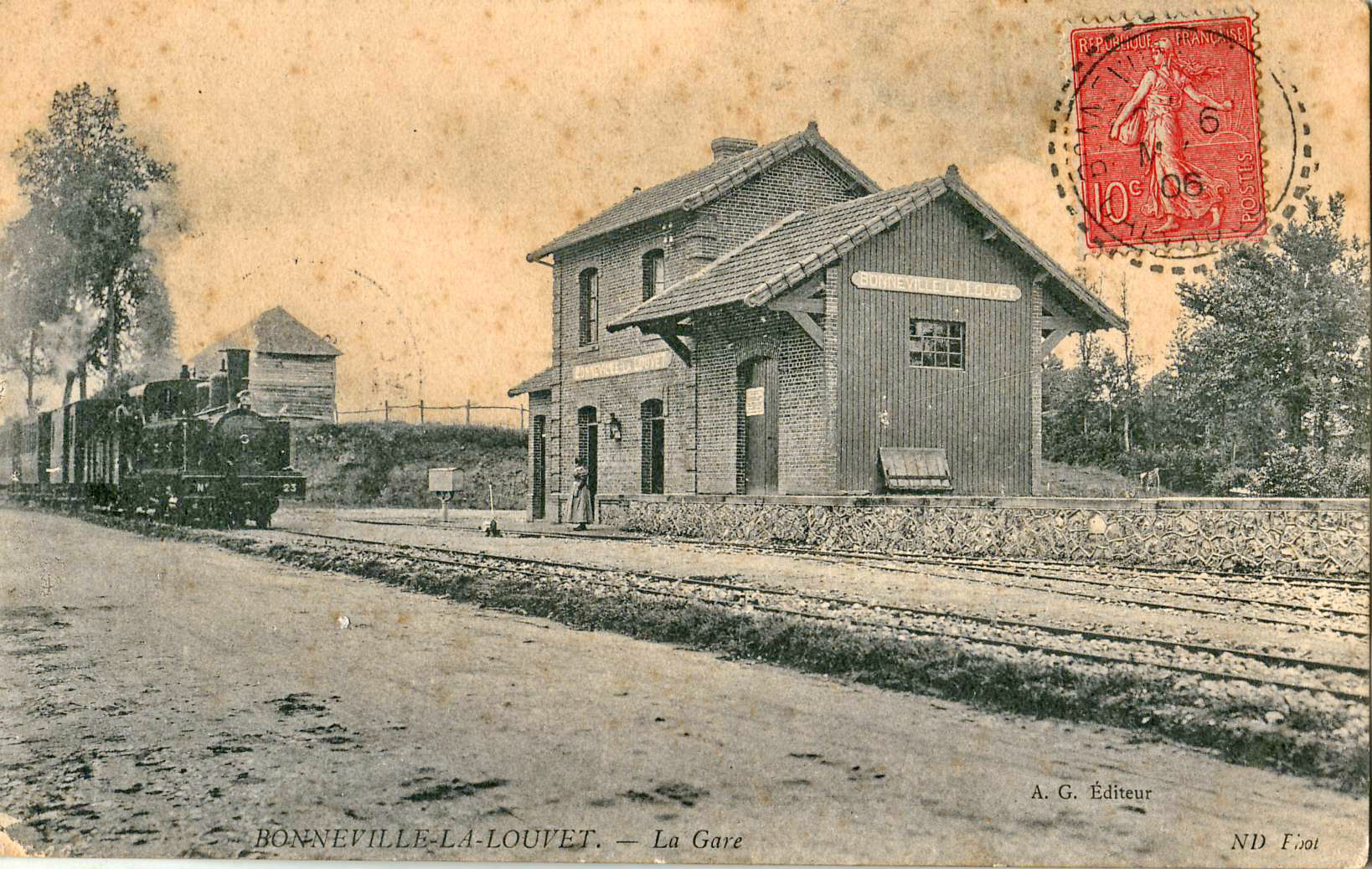
- A postcard view of Bonneville-la-Louvet railway station in the early 20th century
- Location of Bonneville-la-Louvet
- Location within France Location within Normandy
- Coordinates: 49°16′32″N 0°20′24″E
- Country: France
- Region: Normandy
- Department: Calvados
- Arrondissement: Lisieux
- Canton: Pont-l'Évêque
- Intercommunality: CC Terre d'Auge

Government
  - Mayor (2024–2026): Marcel Greaume
- Area^{1}: 20.75 km^{2} (8.01 sq mi)
- Elevation: 25 m (82 ft)
- Highest elevation: 166 m (545 ft)
- Lowest elevation: 39 m (128 ft)
- Population (2023): 825
  - Density: 39.8/km^{2} (103/sq mi)
- Time zone: UTC+01:00 (CET)
  - Summer (DST): UTC+02:00 (CEST)
- INSEE/Postal code: 14085 /14130
- ^{1} French Land Register data, which excludes lakes, ponds, glaciers > 1 km^{2} (0.386 sq mi or 247 acres) and river estuaries.

Bonneville-la-Louvet (French pronunciation: [bɔnvil la luvɛ]) is a commune in the Calvados department in the Normandy region in northwestern France.

== Geography ==
The commune is located in the heart of the Pays d'Auge, 12 km east of Pont-l'Évêque and 18 km southeast of Honfleur.

== Population ==
Historical population
Year	Pop.	±% p.a.
1968	677	—
1975	586	−2.04%
1982	613	+0.65%
1990	673	+1.17%
1999	667	−0.10%
2007	778	+1.94%
2012	785	+0.18%
2017	756	−0.75%
2023	825	+1.47%
Source: INSEE

== See also ==
- Communes of the Calvados department
