= Le Brévedent =

- Commune
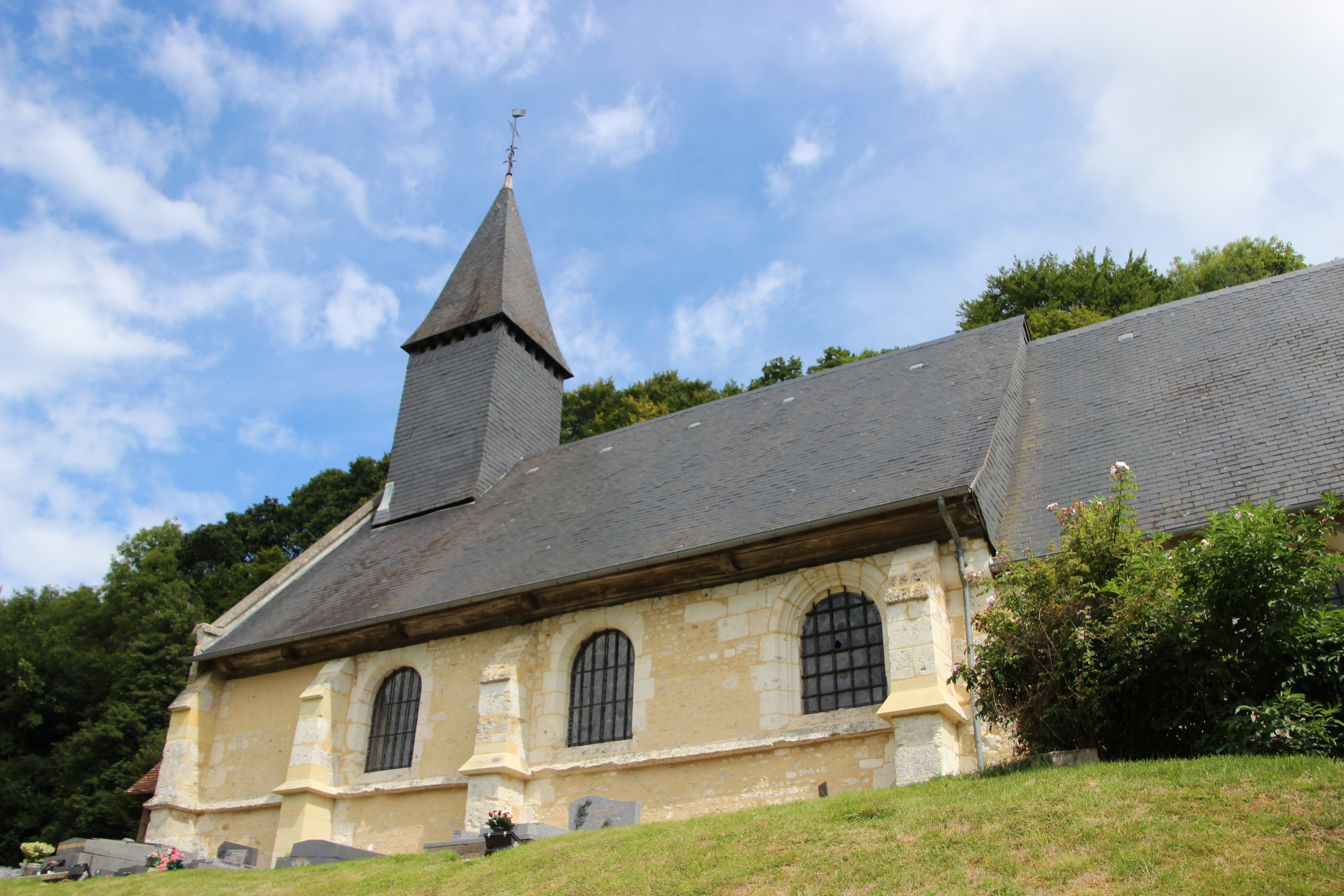
- The church in Le Brévedent
- Location of Le Brévedent
- Location within France Location within Normandy
- Coordinates: 49°13′43″N 0°18′18″E
- Country: France
- Region: Normandy
- Department: Calvados
- Arrondissement: Lisieux
- Canton: Pont-l'Évêque
- Intercommunality: CC Terre d'Auge

Government
  - Mayor (2020–2026): Jean-Aimé de Sanderval
- Area^{1}: 4.43 km^{2} (1.71 sq mi)
- Elevation: 85 m (279 ft)
- Highest elevation: 143 m (469 ft)
- Lowest elevation: 62 m (203 ft)
- Population (2023): 201
  - Density: 45.4/km^{2} (118/sq mi)
- Time zone: UTC+01:00 (CET)
  - Summer (DST): UTC+02:00 (CEST)
- INSEE/Postal code: 14104 /14130
- ^{1} French Land Register data, which excludes lakes, ponds, glaciers > 1 km^{2} (0.386 sq mi or 247 acres) and river estuaries.

Le Brévedent (French pronunciation: [lə bʁevdɑ̃]) is a commune in the Calvados department in the Normandy region in northwestern France.

== Population ==
Historical population
Year	Pop.	±% p.a.
1968	94	—
1975	86	−1.26%
1982	94	+1.28%
1990	101	+0.90%
1999	146	+4.18%
2007	148	+0.17%
2012	166	+2.32%
2017	172	+0.71%
2023	201	+2.63%
Source: INSEE

== See also ==
- Communes of the Calvados department
