= Canton of Pont-l'Évêque =

Coordinates: 49.29°N 0.19°E

Pont-l'Évêque
- Canton
- Interactive map of Pont-l'Évêque
- Country: France
- Region: Normandy
- Department: Calvados
- No. of communes: {{{nbcomm}}}

Government
  - Representatives (2021–2028): Hubert Courseaux; Audrey Gadenne
- Area: 371.91 km^{2} (143.60 sq mi)
- Population (2023): 28,957
  - Density: 77.860/km^{2} (201.66/sq mi)
- INSEE code: 14 21

The canton of Pont-l'Évêque is an administrative division of the Calvados department, northwestern France. Its borders were modified at the French canton reorganisation which came into effect in March 2015. Its seat is in Pont-l'Évêque.

== Composition ==
It consists of the following communes:

1. Les Authieux-sur-Calonne
2. Beaumont-en-Auge
3. Benerville-sur-Mer
4. Blangy-le-Château
5. Blonville-sur-Mer
6. Bonneville-la-Louvet
7. Bonneville-sur-Touques
8. Le Breuil-en-Auge
9. Le Brévedent
10. Canapville
11. Clarbec
12. Coquainvilliers
13. Englesqueville-en-Auge
14. Fauguernon
15. Le Faulq
16. Fierville-les-Parcs
17. Firfol
18. Fumichon
19. Glanville
20. Hermival-les-Vaux
21. Manneville-la-Pipard
22. Le Mesnil-sur-Blangy
23. Moyaux
24. Norolles
25. Ouilly-du-Houley
26. Ouilly-le-Vicomte
27. Pierrefitte-en-Auge
28. Le Pin
29. Pont-l'Évêque
30. Reux
31. Rocques
32. Saint-André-d'Hébertot
33. Saint-Arnoult
34. Saint-Benoît-d'Hébertot
35. Saint-Étienne-la-Thillaye
36. Saint-Hymer
37. Saint-Julien-sur-Calonne
38. Saint-Martin-aux-Chartrains
39. Saint-Philbert-des-Champs
40. Saint-Pierre-Azif
41. Surville
42. Le Torquesne
43. Tourgéville
44. Tourville-en-Auge
45. Vauville
46. Vieux-Bourg
47. Villers-sur-Mer

== Councillors ==
Election	Councillors	Party	Occupation
2015	Hubert Courseaux	DVD	Mayor of Bonneville-la-Louvet
2015	Audrey Gadenne	DVD	Councillor of Reux

== Pictures of the canton ==
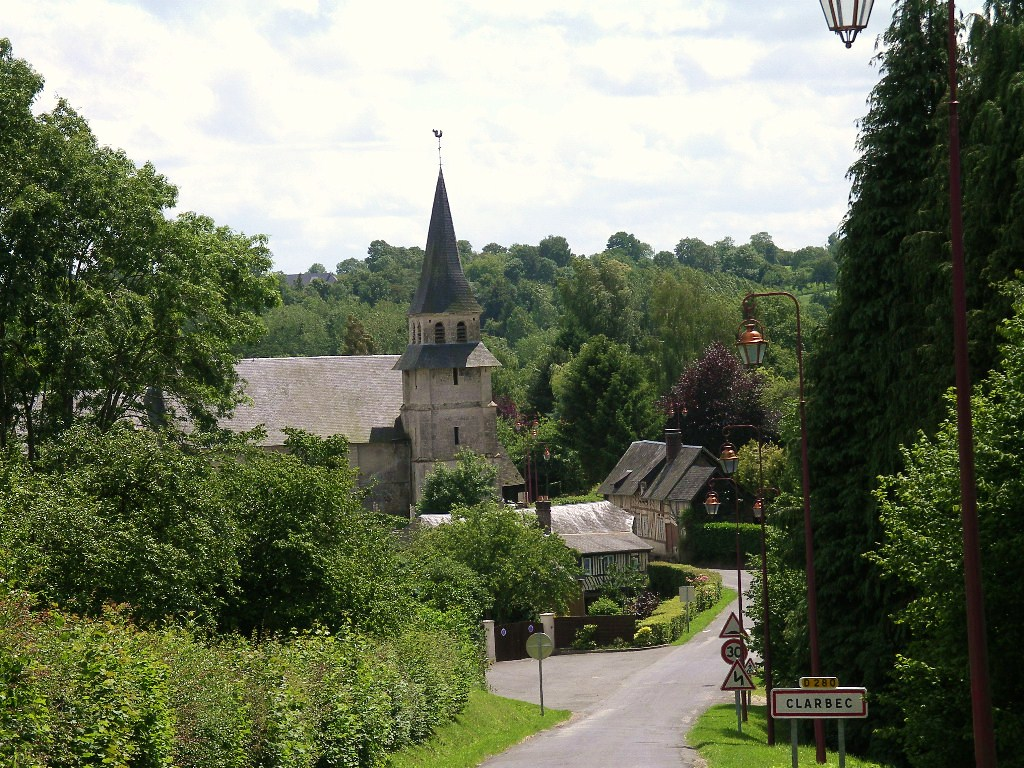
View of Clarbec

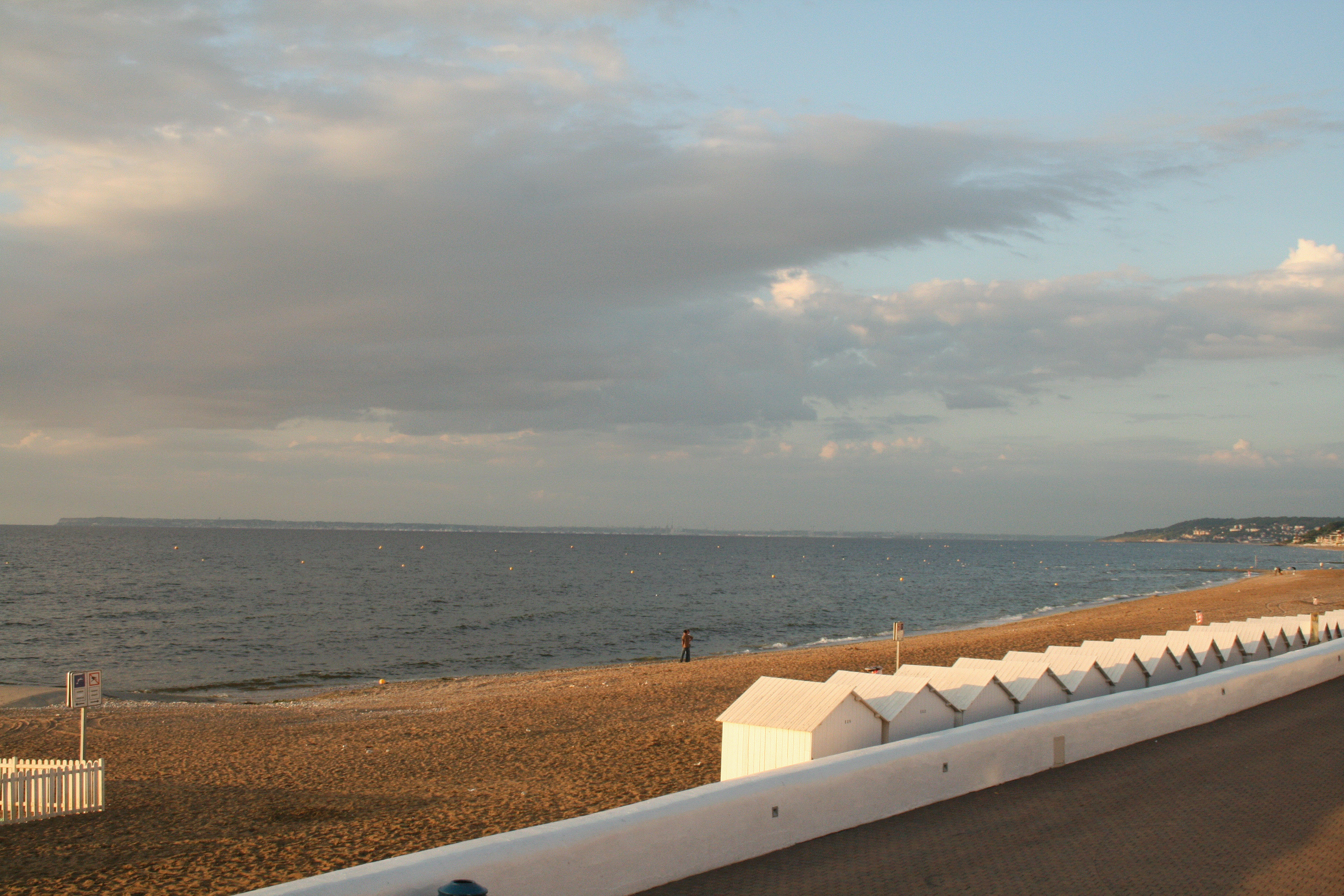
Beachside of Villers-sur-Mer

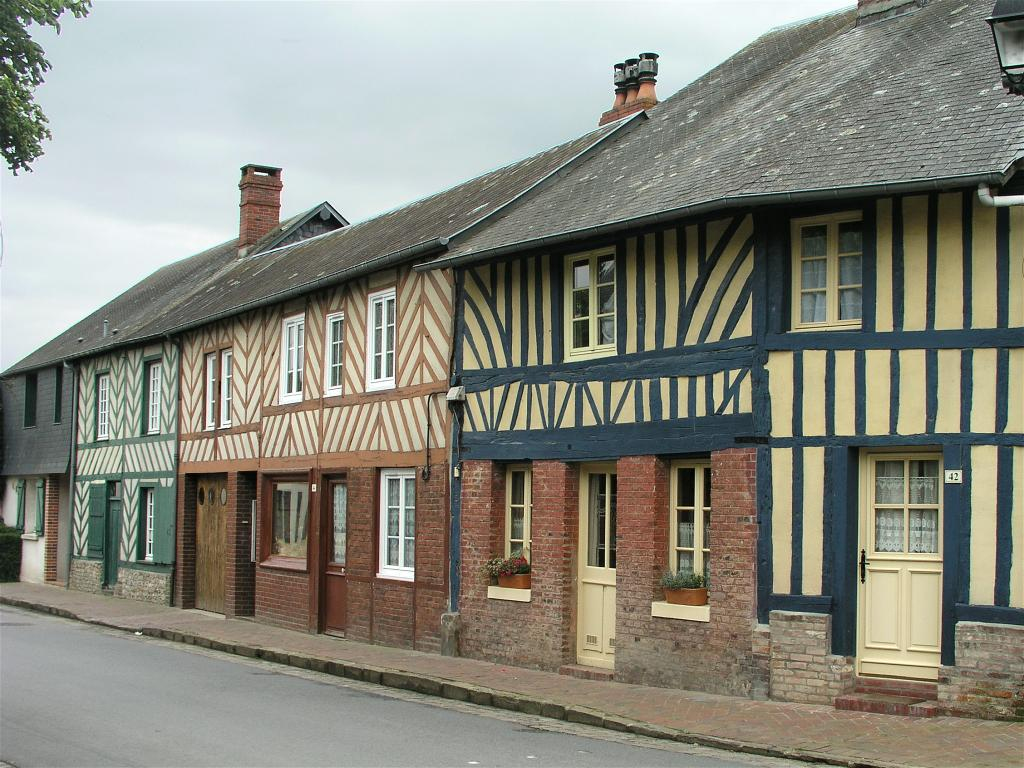
Timber-framed house in Blangy-le-Château
