= Ouilly-du-Houley =

- Commune
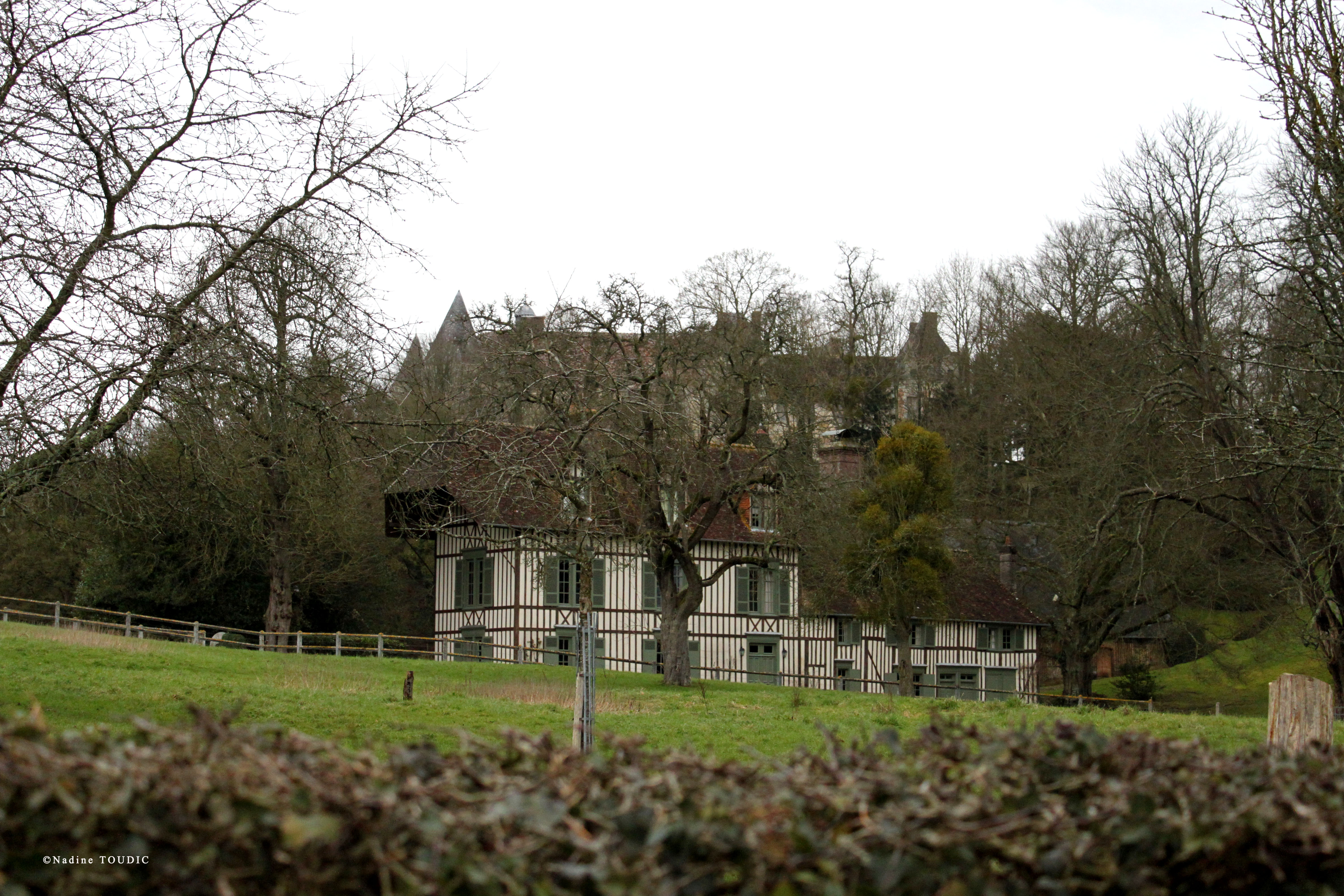
- The centre of Ouilly-du-Houley

- Coat of arms
- Location of Ouilly-du-Houley
- Location within France Location within Normandy
- Coordinates: 49°10′06″N 0°19′52″E
- Country: France
- Region: Normandy
- Department: Calvados
- Arrondissement: Lisieux
- Canton: Pont-l'Évêque
- Intercommunality: CA Lisieux Normandie

Government
  - Mayor (2025–2026): Laurent Castel
- Area^{1}: 8.92 km^{2} (3.44 sq mi)
- Elevation: 85 m (279 ft)
- Highest elevation: 165 m (541 ft)
- Lowest elevation: 72 m (236 ft)
- Population (2023): 256
  - Density: 28.7/km^{2} (74.3/sq mi)
- Time zone: UTC+01:00 (CET)
  - Summer (DST): UTC+02:00 (CEST)
- INSEE/Postal code: 14484 /14590
- ^{1} French Land Register data, which excludes lakes, ponds, glaciers > 1 km^{2} (0.386 sq mi or 247 acres) and river estuaries.

Ouilly-du-Houley (French pronunciation: [uji dy ulɛ]) is a commune in the Calvados department in the Normandy region in northwestern France.

== Population ==
Historical population
Year	Pop.	±% p.a.
1968	188	—
1975	158	−2.45%
1982	172	+1.22%
1990	183	+0.78%
1999	193	+0.59%
2007	184	−0.60%
2012	218	+3.45%
2017	240	+1.94%
2023	256	+1.08%
Source: INSEE

== See also ==
- Communes of the Calvados department
