= Saint-Julien-sur-Calonne =

- Commune
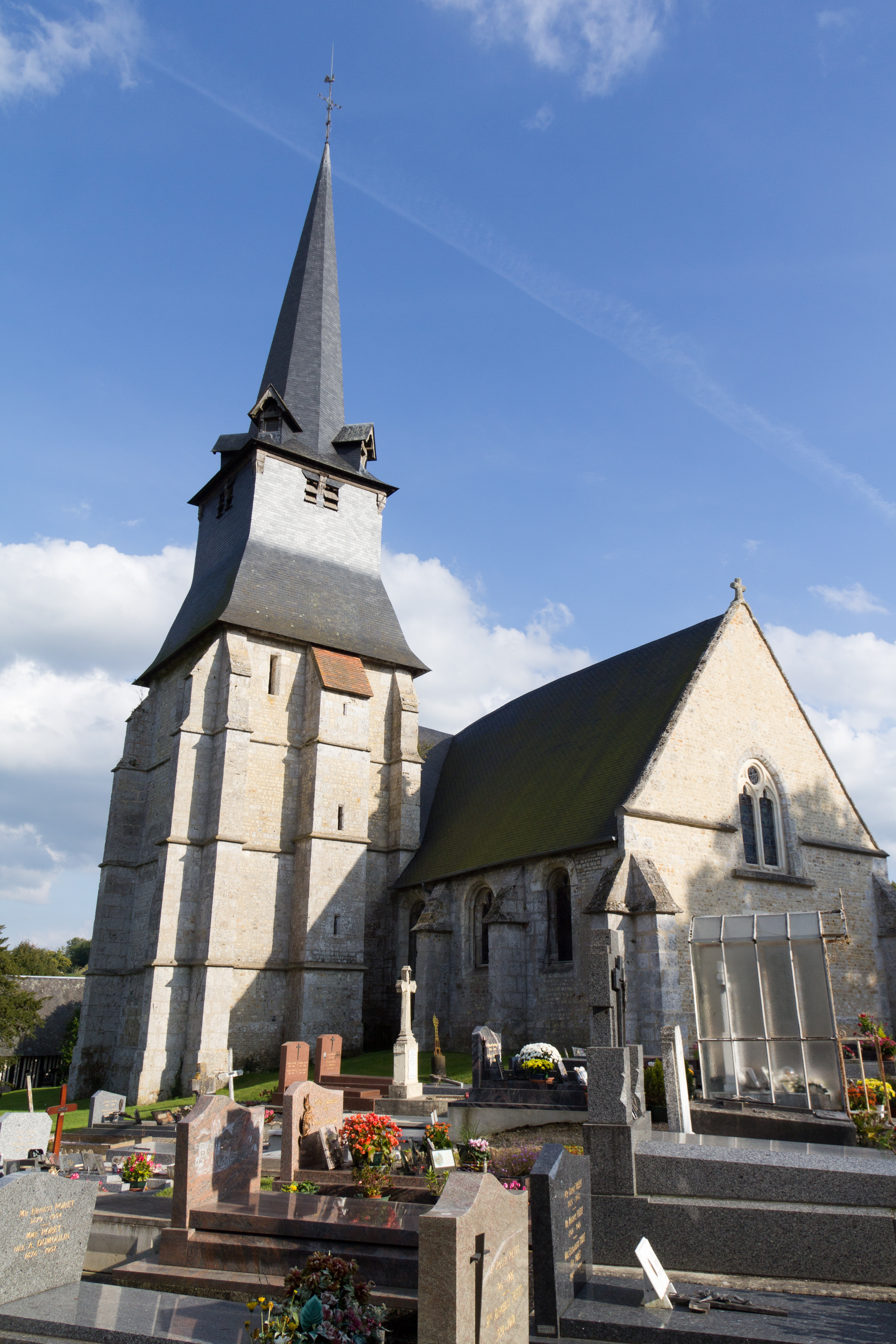
- The church in Saint-Julien-sur-Calonne
- Location of Saint-Julien-sur-Calonne
- Location within France Location within Normandy
- Coordinates: 49°17′29″N 0°13′43″E
- Country: France
- Region: Normandy
- Department: Calvados
- Arrondissement: Lisieux
- Canton: Pont-l'Évêque
- Intercommunality: CC Terre d'Auge

Government
  - Mayor (2022–2026): Patrick Levaque
- Area^{1}: 8.54 km^{2} (3.30 sq mi)
- Elevation: 132 m (433 ft)
- Highest elevation: 147 m (482 ft)
- Lowest elevation: 11 m (36 ft)
- Population (2023): 178
  - Density: 20.8/km^{2} (54.0/sq mi)
- Time zone: UTC+01:00 (CET)
  - Summer (DST): UTC+02:00 (CEST)
- INSEE/Postal code: 14601 /14130
- ^{1} French Land Register data, which excludes lakes, ponds, glaciers > 1 km^{2} (0.386 sq mi or 247 acres) and river estuaries.

Saint-Julien-sur-Calonne (French pronunciation: [sɛ̃ ʒyljɛ̃ syʁ kalɔn]) is a commune in the Calvados department in the Normandy region in northwestern France.

== Population ==
Historical population
Year	Pop.	±% p.a.
1968	211	—
1975	188	−1.64%
1982	199	+0.82%
1990	212	+0.79%
1999	189	−1.27%
2007	193	+0.26%
2012	182	−1.17%
2017	165	−1.94%
2023	178	+1.27%
Source: INSEE

== See also ==
- Communes of the Calvados department
