= Clarbec =

- Commune
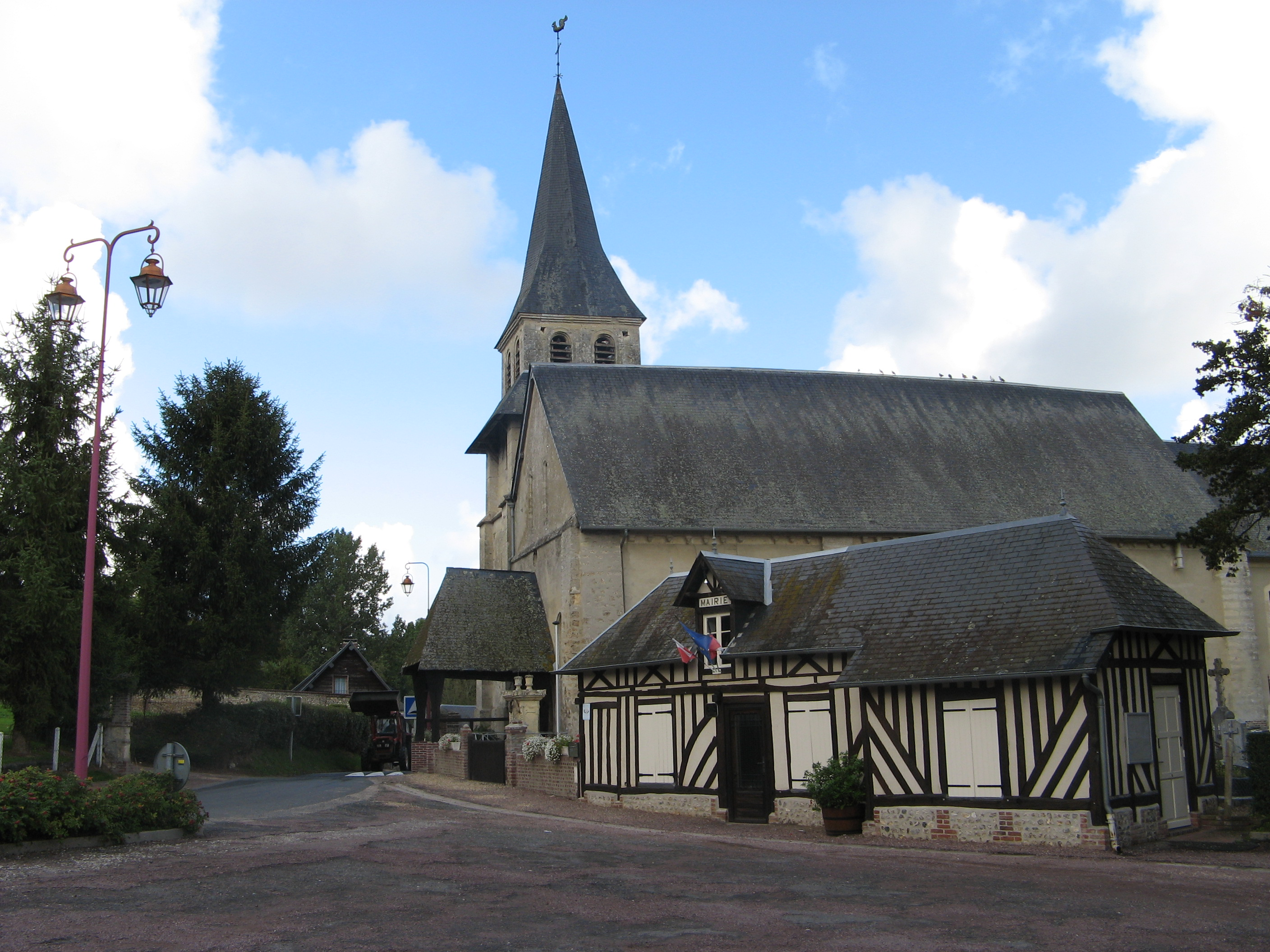
- The church in Clarbec

- Coat of arms
- Location of Clarbec
- Location within France Location within Normandy
- Coordinates: 49°15′02″N 0°08′04″E
- Country: France
- Region: Normandy
- Department: Calvados
- Arrondissement: Lisieux
- Canton: Pont-l'Évêque
- Intercommunality: CC Terre d'Auge

Government
  - Mayor (2020–2026): Nicole Lie
- Area^{1}: 9.7 km^{2} (3.7 sq mi)
- Elevation: 90 m (300 ft)
- Highest elevation: 140 m (460 ft)
- Lowest elevation: 47 m (154 ft)
- Population (2023): 314
  - Density: 32/km^{2} (84/sq mi)
- Time zone: UTC+01:00 (CET)
  - Summer (DST): UTC+02:00 (CEST)
- INSEE/Postal code: 14161 /14130
- ^{1} French Land Register data, which excludes lakes, ponds, glaciers > 1 km^{2} (0.386 sq mi or 247 acres) and river estuaries.

Clarbec (French pronunciation: [klaʁbɛk]) is a commune in the Calvados department in the Normandy region in northwestern France.

== Population ==
Historical population
Year	Pop.	±% p.a.
1968	309	—
1975	265	−2.17%
1982	251	−0.77%
1990	264	+0.63%
1999	275	+0.45%
2007	350	+3.06%
2012	386	+1.98%
2017	360	−1.38%
2023	314	−2.25%
Source: INSEE

== International relations ==
Clarbec is twinned with Veitshöchheim, Germany since 1995.

== See also ==
- Communes of the Calvados department
