= Tourville-en-Auge =

- Commune
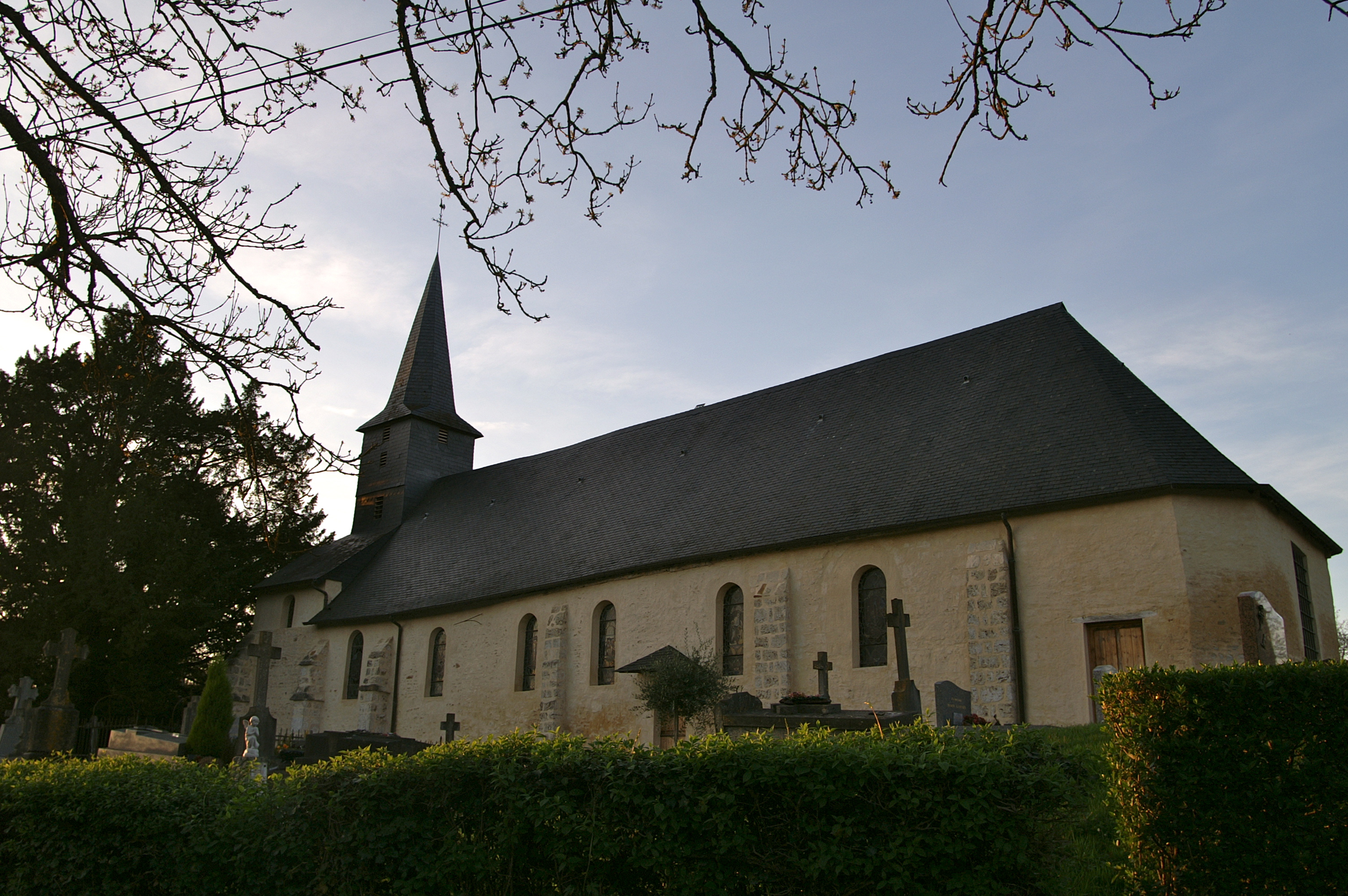
- The church in Tourville-en-Auge
- Location of Tourville-en-Auge
- Location within France Location within Normandy
- Coordinates: 49°19′21″N 0°12′10″E
- Country: France
- Region: Normandy
- Department: Calvados
- Arrondissement: Lisieux
- Canton: Pont-l'Évêque
- Intercommunality: CC Terre d'Auge

Government
  - Mayor (2020–2026): Rémy Laplanche
- Area^{1}: 3.16 km^{2} (1.22 sq mi)
- Elevation: 62 m (203 ft)
- Highest elevation: 140 m (460 ft)
- Lowest elevation: 27 m (89 ft)
- Population (2023): 257
  - Density: 81.3/km^{2} (211/sq mi)
- Time zone: UTC+01:00 (CET)
  - Summer (DST): UTC+02:00 (CEST)
- INSEE/Postal code: 14706 /14130
- ^{1} French Land Register data, which excludes lakes, ponds, glaciers > 1 km^{2} (0.386 sq mi or 247 acres) and river estuaries.

Tourville-en-Auge (French pronunciation: [tuʁvil ɑ̃.n‿oʒ], literally Tourville in Auge) is a commune in the Calvados department in the Normandy region in northwestern France.

== Population ==
Historical population
Year	Pop.	±% p.a.
1968	131	—
1975	140	+0.95%
1982	166	+2.46%
1990	207	+2.80%
1999	221	+0.73%
2007	231	+0.55%
2012	255	+2.00%
2017	234	−1.70%
2023	257	+1.57%
Source: INSEE

== See also ==
- Communes of the Calvados department
