= Le Breuil-en-Auge =

- Commune
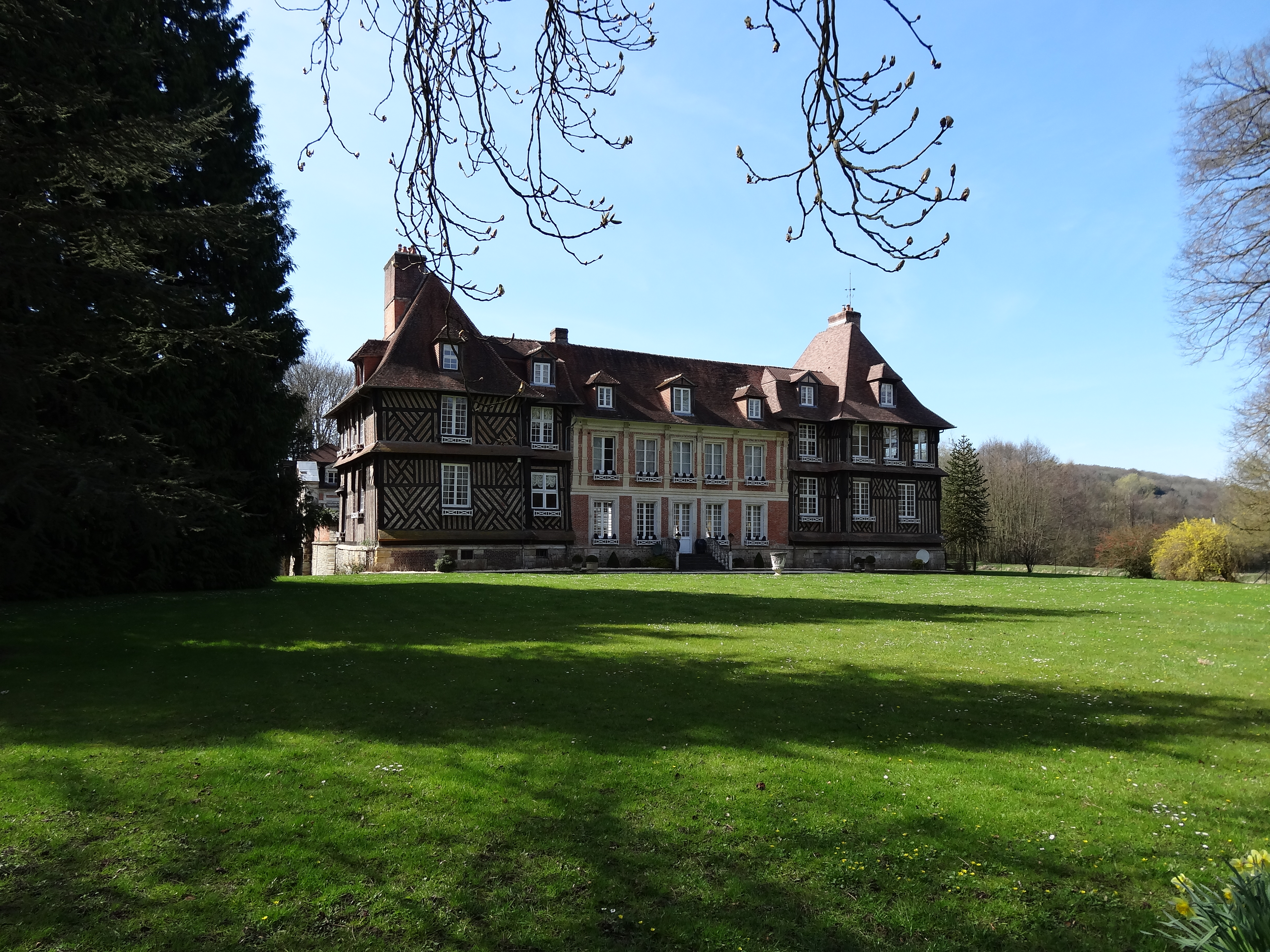
- The chateau in Le Breuil-en-Auge
- Location of Le Breuil-en-Auge
- Location within France Location within Normandy
- Coordinates: 49°13′40″N 0°13′37″E
- Country: France
- Region: Normandy
- Department: Calvados
- Arrondissement: Lisieux
- Canton: Pont-l'Évêque
- Intercommunality: CC Terre d'Auge

Government
  - Mayor (2020–2026): David Pottier
- Area^{1}: 9.39 km^{2} (3.63 sq mi)
- Elevation: 38 m (125 ft)
- Highest elevation: 145 m (476 ft)
- Lowest elevation: 21 m (69 ft)
- Population (2023): 952
  - Density: 101/km^{2} (263/sq mi)
- Time zone: UTC+01:00 (CET)
  - Summer (DST): UTC+02:00 (CEST)
- INSEE/Postal code: 14102 /14130
- ^{1} French Land Register data, which excludes lakes, ponds, glaciers > 1 km^{2} (0.386 sq mi or 247 acres) and river estuaries.

Le Breuil-en-Auge (French pronunciation: [lə bʁœj ɑ̃.n‿oʒ], literally Le Breuil in Auge) is a commune in the Calvados department in the Normandy region in northwestern France.

== Population ==
Historical population
Year	Pop.	±% p.a.
1968	599	—
1975	643	+1.02%
1982	751	+2.24%
1990	779	+0.46%
1999	846	+0.92%
2007	938	+1.30%
2012	1,002	+1.33%
2017	1,028	+0.51%
2023	952	−1.27%
Source: INSEE

== See also ==
- Communes of the Calvados department
