= Fumichon =

- Commune
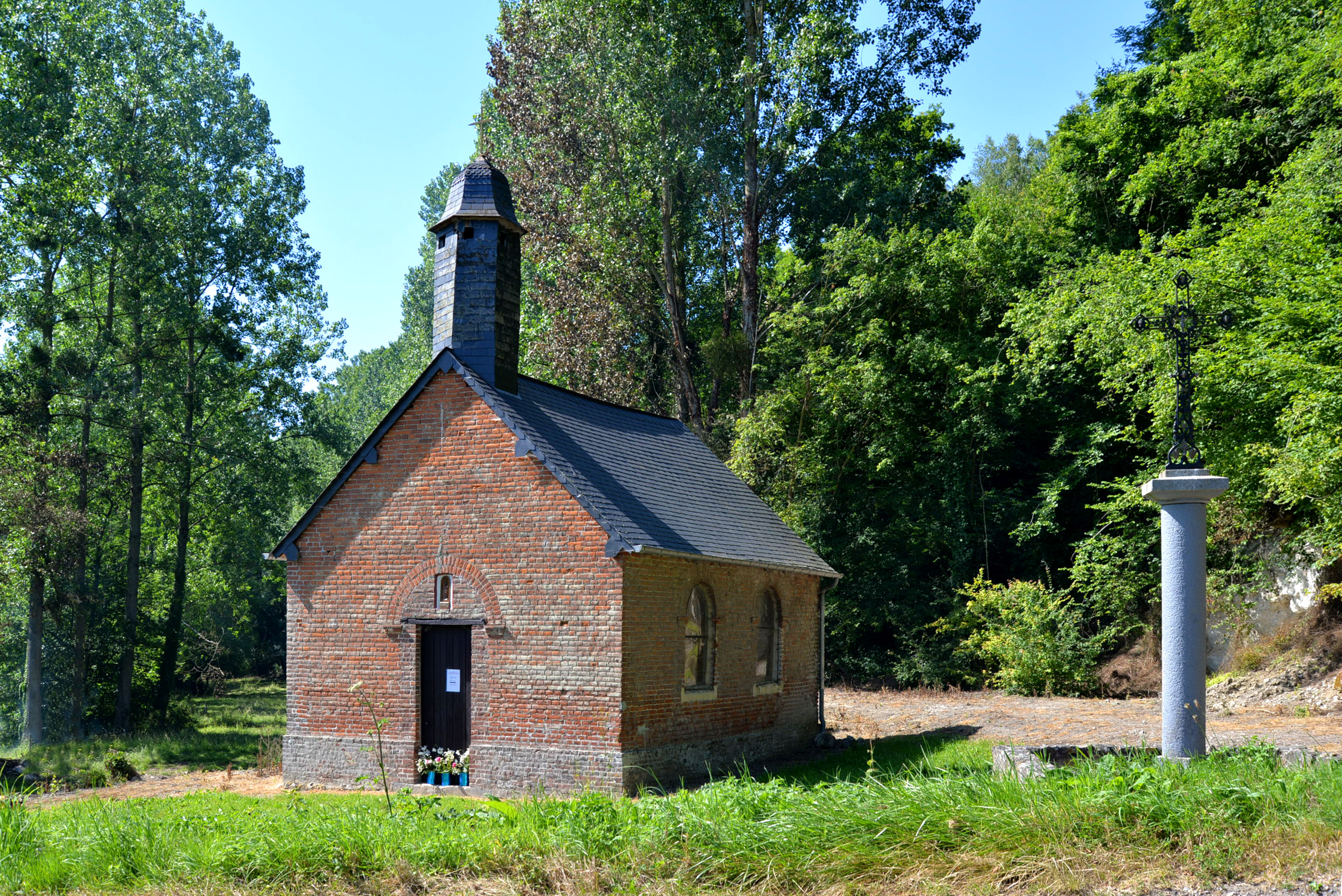
- The chapel in Fumichon
- Location of Fumichon
- Location within France Location within Normandy
- Coordinates: 49°10′26″N 0°22′19″E
- Country: France
- Region: Normandy
- Department: Calvados
- Arrondissement: Lisieux
- Canton: Pont-l'Évêque
- Intercommunality: CA Lisieux Normandie

Government
  - Mayor (2020–2026): Gilbert Daufresne
- Area^{1}: 6.63 km^{2} (2.56 sq mi)
- Elevation: 160 m (520 ft)
- Highest elevation: 171 m (561 ft)
- Lowest elevation: 103 m (338 ft)
- Population (2023): 268
  - Density: 40.4/km^{2} (105/sq mi)
- Time zone: UTC+01:00 (CET)
  - Summer (DST): UTC+02:00 (CEST)
- INSEE/Postal code: 14293 /14590
- ^{1} French Land Register data, which excludes lakes, ponds, glaciers > 1 km^{2} (0.386 sq mi or 247 acres) and river estuaries.

Fumichon (French pronunciation: [fymiʃɔ̃]) is a commune in the Calvados department in the Normandy region in northwestern France.

== Population ==
Historical population
Year	Pop.	±% p.a.
1968	146	—
1975	131	−1.54%
1982	178	+4.48%
1990	185	+0.48%
1999	244	+3.12%
2007	272	+1.37%
2012	276	+0.29%
2017	283	+0.50%
2023	268	−0.90%
Source: INSEE

== See also ==
- Communes of the Calvados department
