= Saint-Étienne-la-Thillaye =

- Commune
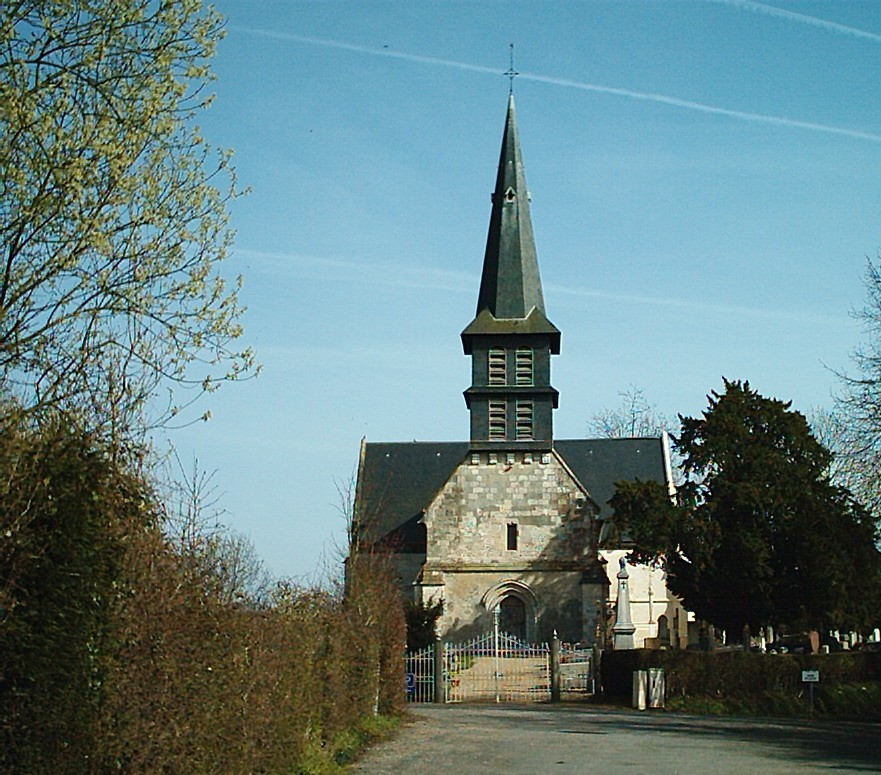
- The church in Saint-Étienne-la-Thillaye
- Location of Saint-Étienne-la-Thillaye
- Location within France Location within Normandy
- Coordinates: 49°17′26″N 0°07′09″E
- Country: France
- Region: Normandy
- Department: Calvados
- Arrondissement: Lisieux
- Canton: Pont-l'Évêque
- Intercommunality: CC Terre d'Auge

Government
  - Mayor (2020–2026): Bruno Vay
- Area^{1}: 12.36 km^{2} (4.77 sq mi)
- Elevation: 20 m (66 ft)
- Highest elevation: 123 m (404 ft)
- Lowest elevation: 2 m (6.6 ft)
- Population (2023): 386
  - Density: 31.2/km^{2} (80.9/sq mi)
- Time zone: UTC+01:00 (CET)
  - Summer (DST): UTC+02:00 (CEST)
- INSEE/Postal code: 14575 /14950
- ^{1} French Land Register data, which excludes lakes, ponds, glaciers > 1 km^{2} (0.386 sq mi or 247 acres) and river estuaries.

Saint-Étienne-la-Thillaye (French pronunciation: [sɛ̃.t‿etjɛn la tijɛ]) is a commune in the Calvados department in the Normandy region in northwestern France.

== Population ==
Historical population
| Year | Pop. | ±% p.a. |
|---|---|---|
| 1968 | 354 | — |
| 1975 | 358 | +0.16% |
| 1982 | 363 | +0.20% |
| 1990 | 386 | +0.77% |
| 1999 | 437 | +1.39% |
| 2007 | 486 | +1.34% |
| 2012 | 463 | −0.96% |
| 2017 | 414 | −2.21% |
| 2023 | 386 | −1.16% |
Source: INSEE

== See also ==
- Communes of the Calvados department
