= Saint-Philbert-des-Champs =

- Commune
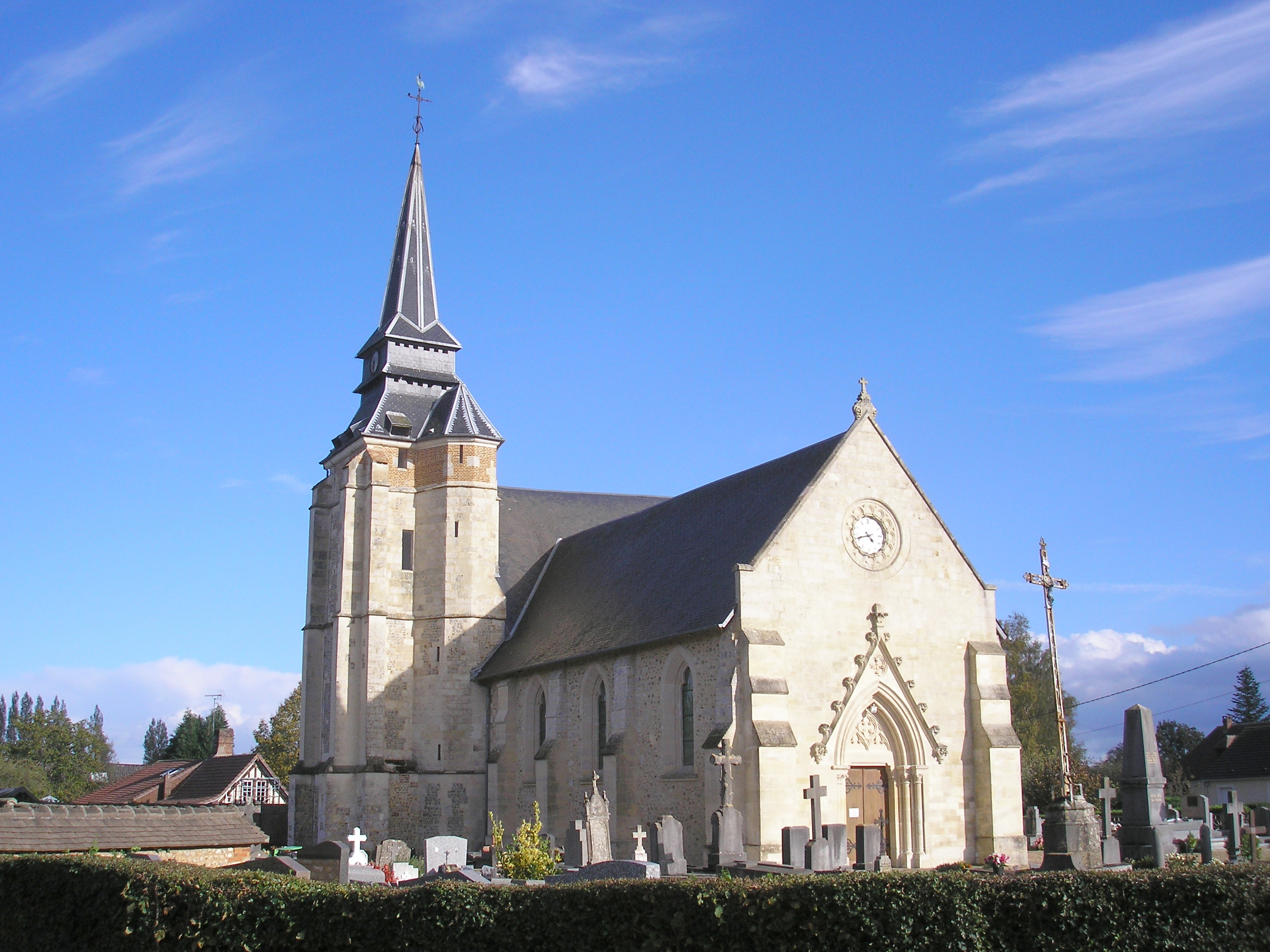
- The church in Saint-Philbert-des-Champs
- Location of Saint-Philbert-des-Champs
- Location within France Location within Normandy
- Coordinates: 49°12′33″N 0°17′01″E
- Country: France
- Region: Normandy
- Department: Calvados
- Arrondissement: Lisieux
- Canton: Pont-l'Évêque
- Intercommunality: CC Terre d'Auge

Government
  - Mayor (2020–2026): Françoise Spruytte
- Area^{1}: 12.03 km^{2} (4.64 sq mi)
- Elevation: 150 m (490 ft)
- Highest elevation: 166 m (545 ft)
- Lowest elevation: 89 m (292 ft)
- Population (2023): 639
  - Density: 53.1/km^{2} (138/sq mi)
- Time zone: UTC+01:00 (CET)
  - Summer (DST): UTC+02:00 (CEST)
- INSEE/Postal code: 14644 /14130
- ^{1} French Land Register data, which excludes lakes, ponds, glaciers > 1 km^{2} (0.386 sq mi or 247 acres) and river estuaries.

Saint-Philbert-des-Champs (French pronunciation: [sɛ̃ filbɛʁ de ʃɑ̃]) is a commune in the Calvados department in the Normandy region in northwestern France.

== Population ==
Historical population
Year	Pop.	±% p.a.
1968	347	—
1975	368	+0.84%
1982	528	+5.29%
1990	574	+1.05%
1999	606	+0.60%
2007	680	+1.45%
2012	657	−0.69%
2017	644	−0.40%
2023	639	−0.13%
Source: INSEE

== See also ==
- Communes of the Calvados department
