= Rocques =

- Commune
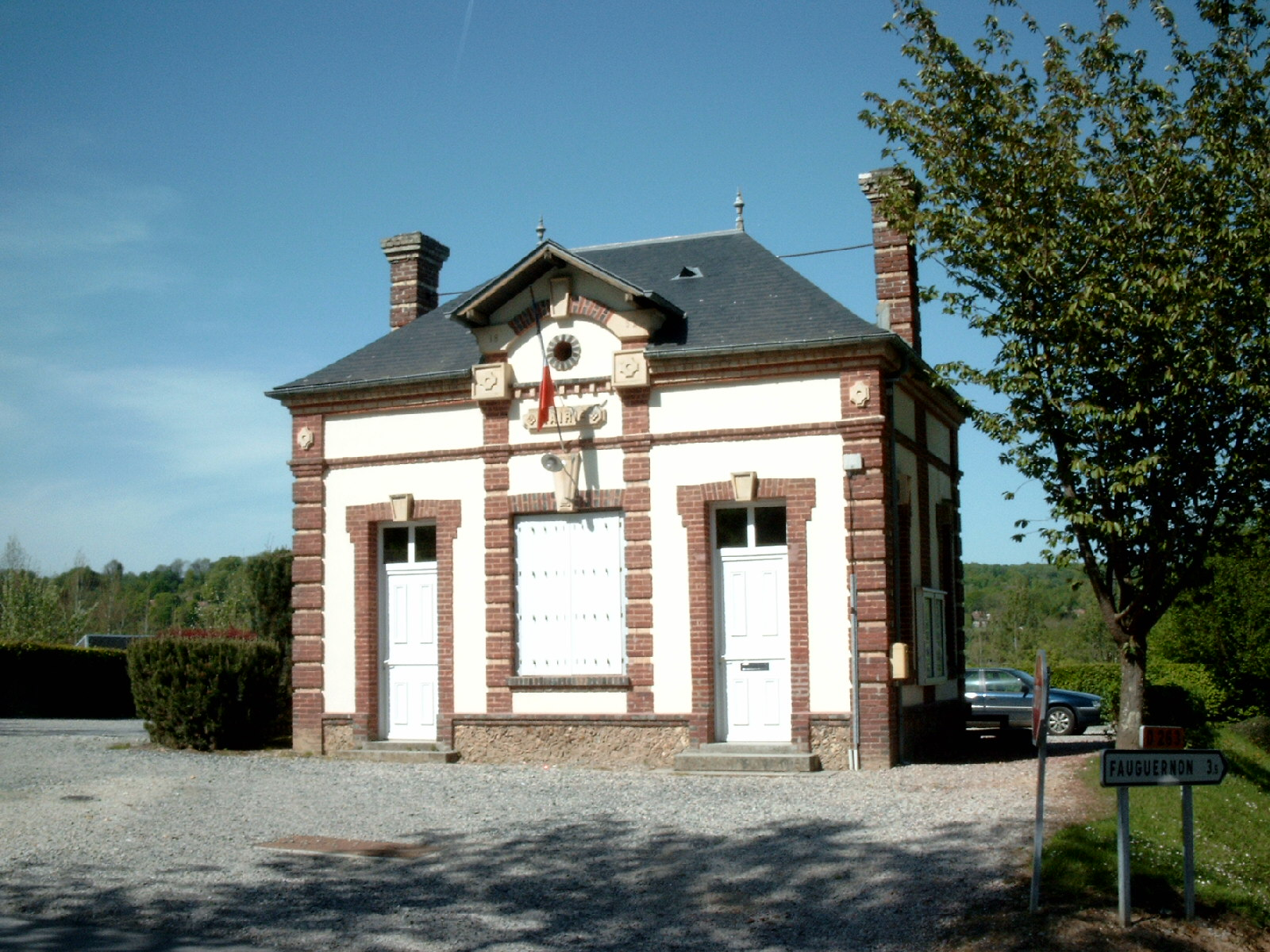
- Town hall

- Coat of arms
- Location of Rocques
- Location within France Location within Normandy
- Coordinates: 49°10′19″N 0°14′38″E
- Country: France
- Region: Normandy
- Department: Calvados
- Arrondissement: Lisieux
- Canton: Pont-l'Évêque
- Intercommunality: CA Lisieux Normandie

Government
  - Mayor (2020–2026): Francine Angée
- Area^{1}: 6.14 km^{2} (2.37 sq mi)
- Elevation: 50 m (160 ft)
- Highest elevation: 143 m (469 ft)
- Lowest elevation: 44 m (144 ft)
- Population (2023): 285
  - Density: 46.4/km^{2} (120/sq mi)
- Time zone: UTC+01:00 (CET)
  - Summer (DST): UTC+02:00 (CEST)
- INSEE/Postal code: 14540 /14100
- ^{1} French Land Register data, which excludes lakes, ponds, glaciers > 1 km^{2} (0.386 sq mi or 247 acres) and river estuaries.

Rocques (French pronunciation: [ʁɔk]) is a commune in the Calvados department in the Normandy région in northwestern France.

It is located 3.5 kilometres (2.2 mi) from Lisieux.

== Administrative ==
The postal code for Rocques is 14100.

== Population ==
Historical population
Year	Pop.	±% p.a.
1968	244	—
1975	201	−2.73%
1982	209	+0.56%
1990	287	+4.04%
1999	308	+0.79%
2007	319	+0.44%
2012	301	−1.15%
2017	286	−1.02%
2023	285	−0.06%
Source: INSEE

== See also ==
- Communes of the Calvados department
