= Norolles =

- Commune
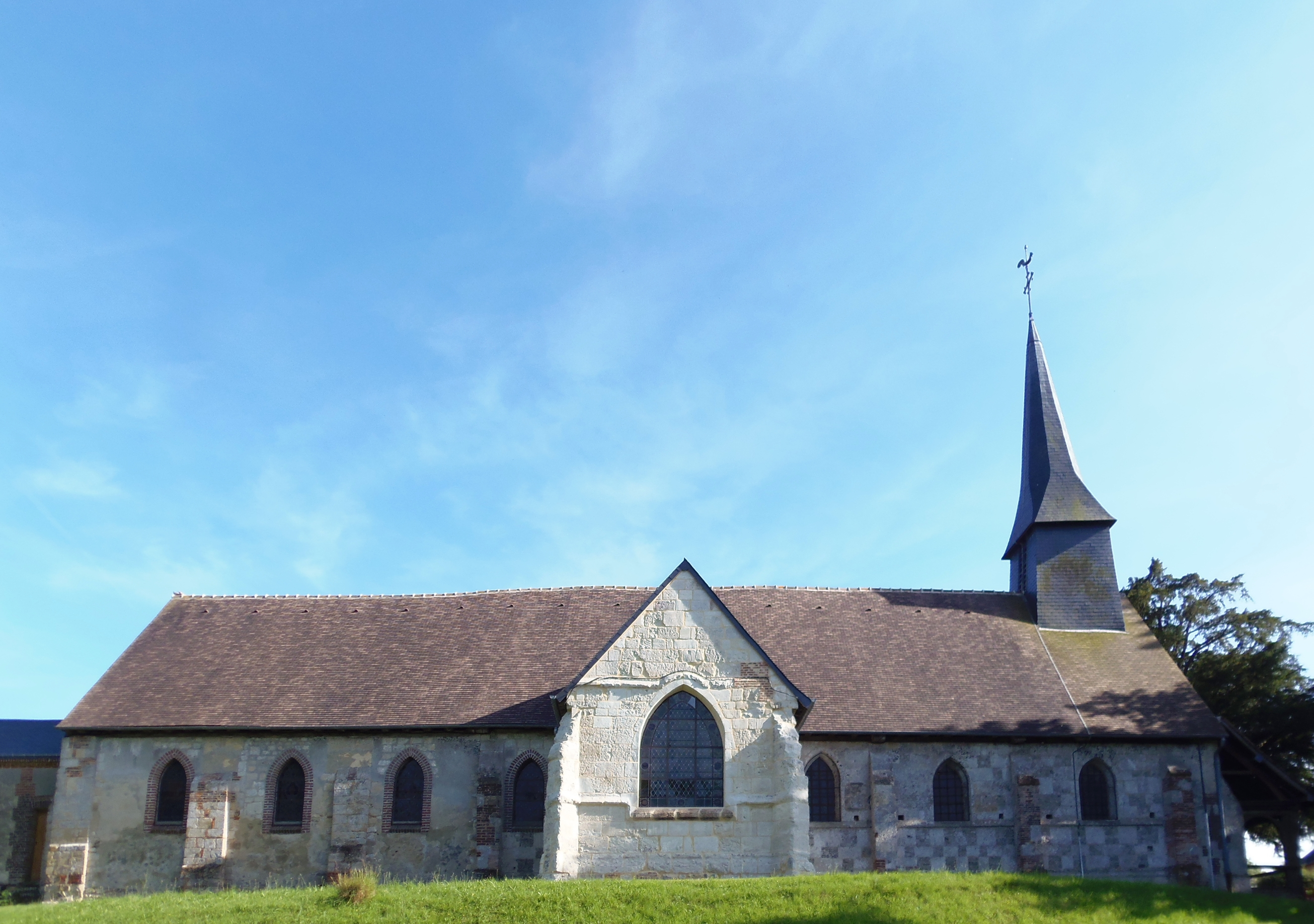
- The church in Norolles
- Location of Norolles
- Location within France Location within Normandy
- Coordinates: 49°12′00″N 0°14′29″E
- Country: France
- Region: Normandy
- Department: Calvados
- Arrondissement: Lisieux
- Canton: Pont-l'Évêque
- Intercommunality: CC Terre d'Auge

Government
  - Mayor (2020–2026): Pierre Avoyne
- Area^{1}: 6.52 km^{2} (2.52 sq mi)
- Elevation: 100 m (330 ft)
- Highest elevation: 157 m (515 ft)
- Lowest elevation: 27 m (89 ft)
- Population (2023): 361
  - Density: 55.4/km^{2} (143/sq mi)
- Time zone: UTC+01:00 (CET)
  - Summer (DST): UTC+02:00 (CEST)
- INSEE/Postal code: 14466 /14100
- ^{1} French Land Register data, which excludes lakes, ponds, glaciers > 1 km^{2} (0.386 sq mi or 247 acres) and river estuaries.

Norolles (French pronunciation: [nɔʁɔl]) is a commune in the Calvados in the Normandy region in northwestern France.

== Population ==
Historical population
Year	Pop.	±% p.a.
1968	169	—
1975	191	+1.76%
1982	236	+3.07%
1990	241	+0.26%
1999	272	+1.35%
2007	263	−0.42%
2012	276	+0.97%
2017	318	+2.87%
2023	361	+2.14%
Source: INSEE

== See also ==
- Communes of the Calvados department
