= Coquainvilliers =

- Commune
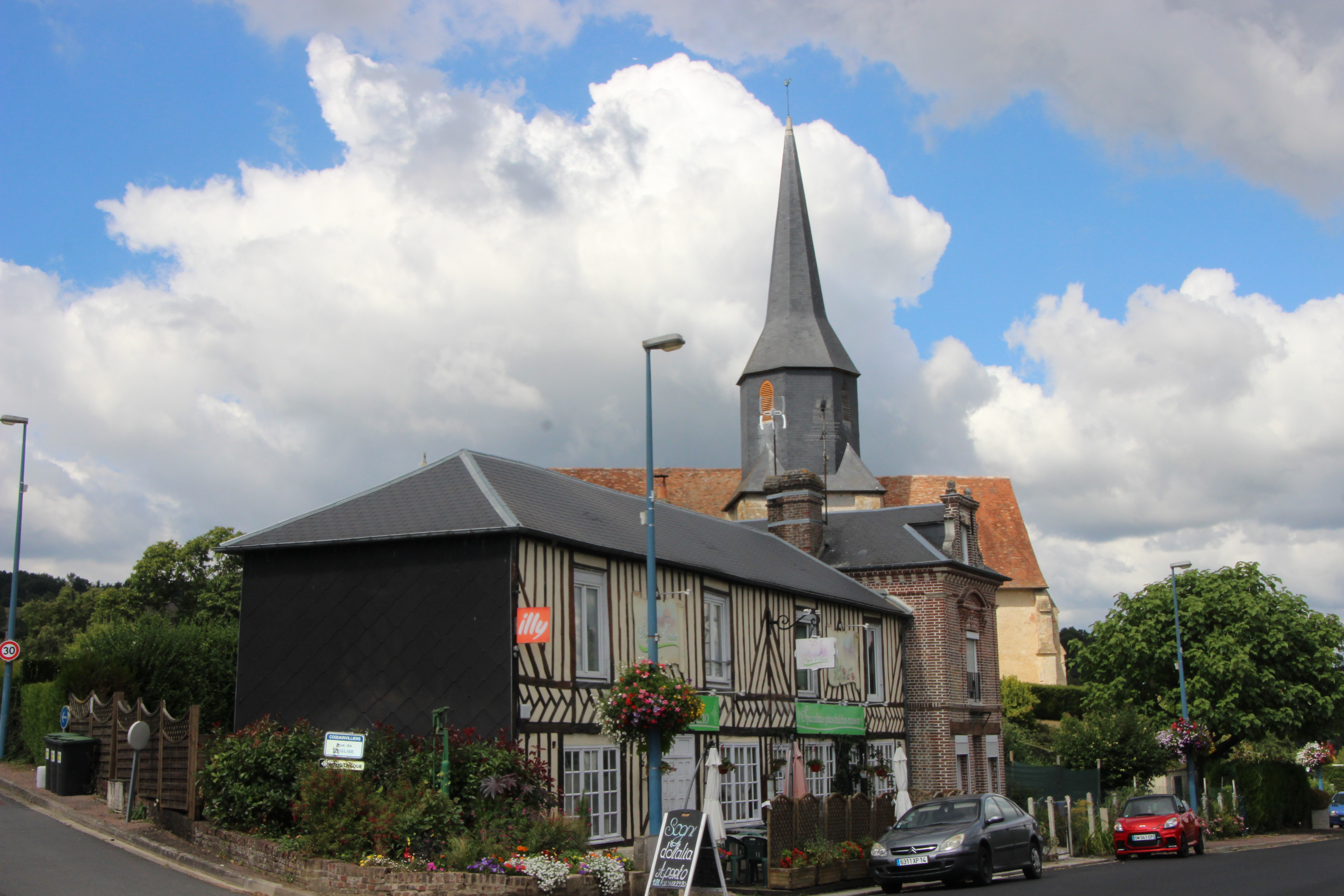
- The church in Coquainvilliers

- Coat of arms
- Location of Coquainvilliers
- Location within France Location within Normandy
- Coordinates: 49°12′00″N 0°13′00″E
- Country: France
- Region: Normandy
- Department: Calvados
- Arrondissement: Lisieux
- Canton: Pont-l'Évêque
- Intercommunality: CA Lisieux Normandie

Government
  - Mayor (2020–2026): Evelyne Le Barbier
- Area^{1}: 12 km^{2} (4.6 sq mi)
- Elevation: 35 m (115 ft)
- Highest elevation: 146 m (479 ft)
- Lowest elevation: 22 m (72 ft)
- Population (2023): 849
  - Density: 71/km^{2} (180/sq mi)
- Time zone: UTC+01:00 (CET)
  - Summer (DST): UTC+02:00 (CEST)
- INSEE/Postal code: 14177 /14130
- ^{1} French Land Register data, which excludes lakes, ponds, glaciers > 1 km^{2} (0.386 sq mi or 247 acres) and river estuaries.

Coquainvilliers (French pronunciation: [kɔkɛ̃vilje]) is a commune in the Calvados department in the Normandy region in northwestern France.

Coquainvilliers, in the Pays d'Auge—a land of horsebreeding, apples, and cows—at the crossroad of the Touques Valley, 10 km (6.2 mi) from Pont-l'Évêque and 6 km (3.7 mi) from Lisieux

It hosts the Calvados brandy apple distillery Boulard.

== Population ==
Historical population
Year	Pop.	±% p.a.
1968	427	—
1975	523	+2.94%
1982	669	+3.58%
1990	712	+0.78%
1999	765	+0.80%
2007	819	+0.86%
2012	863	+1.05%
2017	856	−0.16%
2023	849	−0.14%
Source: INSEE

== International relations ==
Coquainvilliers is twinned with:

- Creech St Michael near Taunton, Somerset, England since 1995.

== See also ==
- Communes of the Calvados department
