= Surville, Calvados =

Surville
- Commune
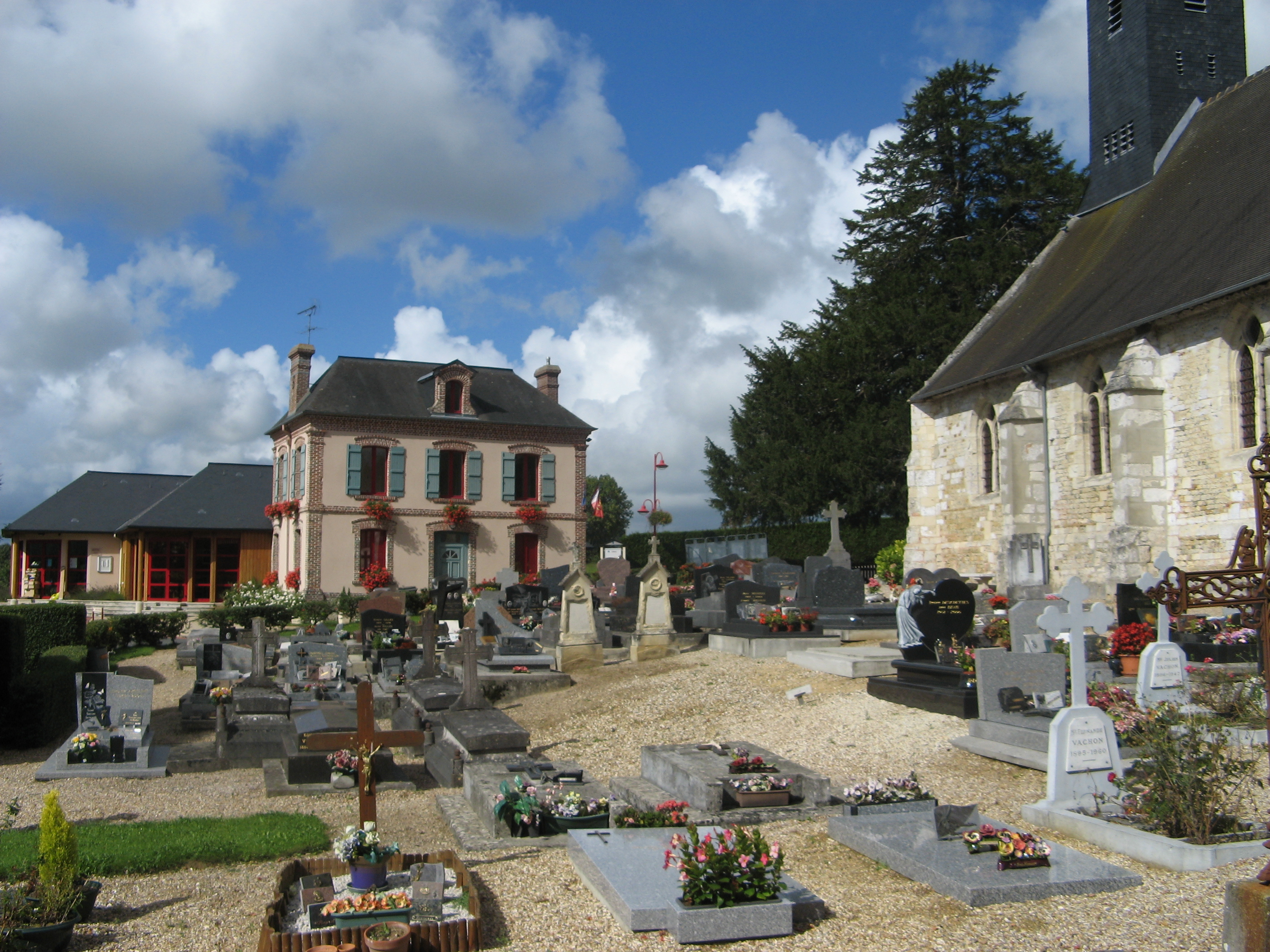
- The town hall in Surville
- Location of Surville
- Location within France Location within Normandy
- Coordinates: 49°18′05″N 0°12′48″E
- Country: France
- Region: Normandy
- Department: Calvados
- Arrondissement: Lisieux
- Canton: Pont-l'Évêque
- Intercommunality: CC Terre d'Auge

Government
  - Mayor (2020–2026): Bernard Dupré
- Area^{1}: 4.80 km^{2} (1.85 sq mi)
- Elevation: 44 m (144 ft)
- Highest elevation: 141 m (463 ft)
- Lowest elevation: 12 m (39 ft)
- Population (2023): 473
  - Density: 98.5/km^{2} (255/sq mi)
- Time zone: UTC+01:00 (CET)
  - Summer (DST): UTC+02:00 (CEST)
- INSEE/Postal code: 14682 /14130
- ^{1} French Land Register data, which excludes lakes, ponds, glaciers > 1 km^{2} (0.386 sq mi or 247 acres) and river estuaries.

Surville (French pronunciation: [syʁvil]) is a commune in the Calvados department in the Normandy region in northwestern France.

== Population ==
Historical population
Year	Pop.	±% p.a.
1968	203	—
1975	198	−0.36%
1982	243	+2.97%
1990	290	+2.23%
1999	381	+3.08%
2007	433	+1.61%
2012	445	+0.55%
2017	442	−0.14%
2023	473	+1.14%
Source: INSEE

== See also ==
- Communes of the Calvados department
