= Ouilly-le-Vicomte =

- Commune
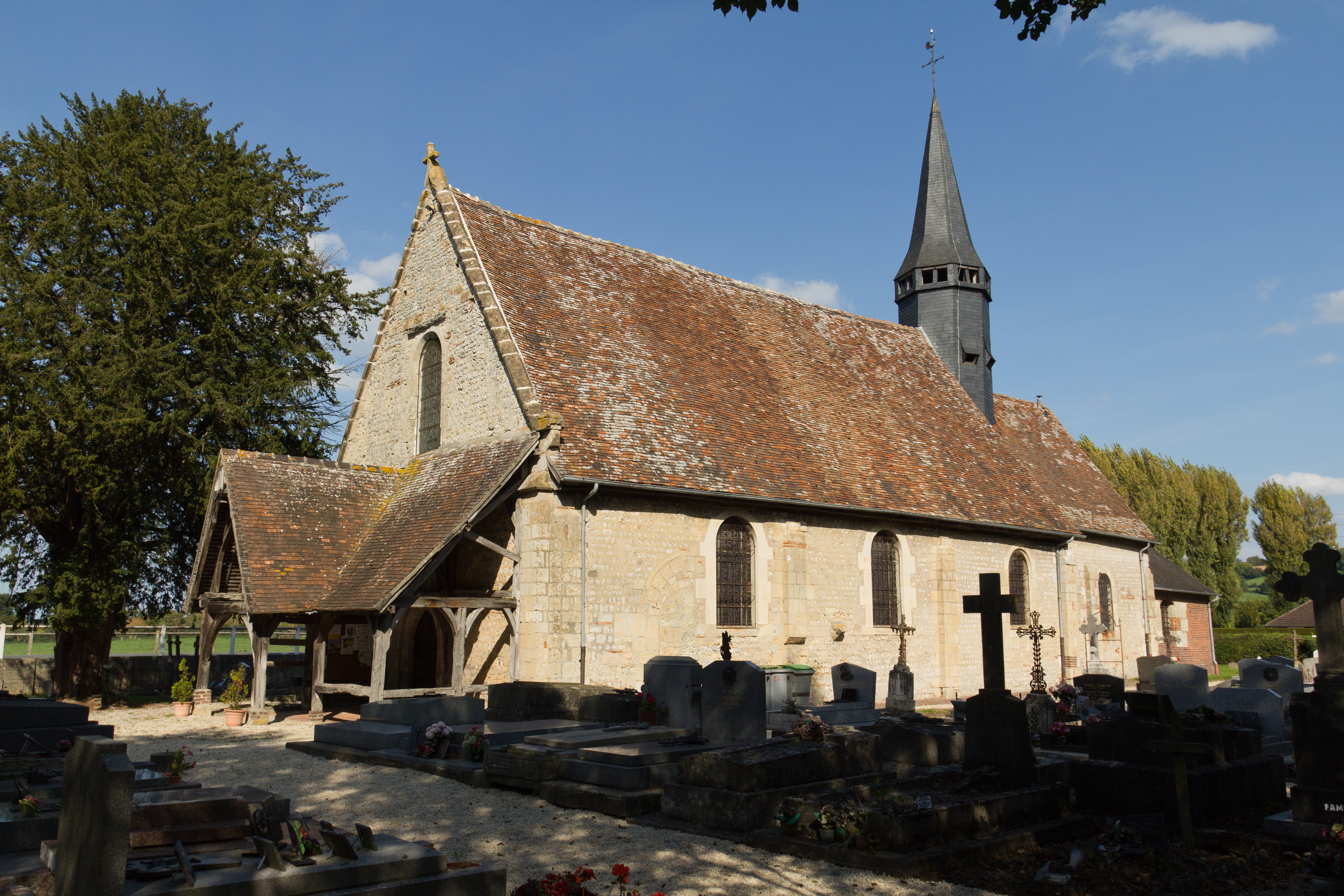
- The church in Ouilly-le-Vicomte

- Coat of arms
- Location of Ouilly-le-Vicomte
- Location within France Location within Normandy
- Coordinates: 49°10′57″N 0°13′30″E
- Country: France
- Region: Normandy
- Department: Calvados
- Arrondissement: Lisieux
- Canton: Pont-l'Évêque
- Intercommunality: CA Lisieux Normandie

Government
  - Mayor (2020–2026): Patrice Metais
- Area^{1}: 7.73 km^{2} (2.98 sq mi)
- Elevation: 35 m (115 ft)
- Highest elevation: 141 m (463 ft)
- Lowest elevation: 31 m (102 ft)
- Population (2023): 756
  - Density: 97.8/km^{2} (253/sq mi)
- Time zone: UTC+01:00 (CET)
  - Summer (DST): UTC+02:00 (CEST)
- INSEE/Postal code: 14487 /14100
- ^{1} French Land Register data, which excludes lakes, ponds, glaciers > 1 km^{2} (0.386 sq mi or 247 acres) and river estuaries.

Ouilly-le-Vicomte (French pronunciation: [uji lə vikɔ̃t]) is a commune in the Calvados department in the Normandy region in northwestern France.

== Population ==
Historical population
Year	Pop.	±% p.a.
1968	570	—
1975	762	+4.23%
1982	854	+1.64%
1990	810	−0.66%
1999	784	−0.36%
2007	746	−0.62%
2012	885	+3.48%
2017	810	−1.76%
2023	756	−1.14%
Source: INSEE

== See also ==
- Communes of the Calvados department
