= Saint-Martin-aux-Chartrains =

- Commune
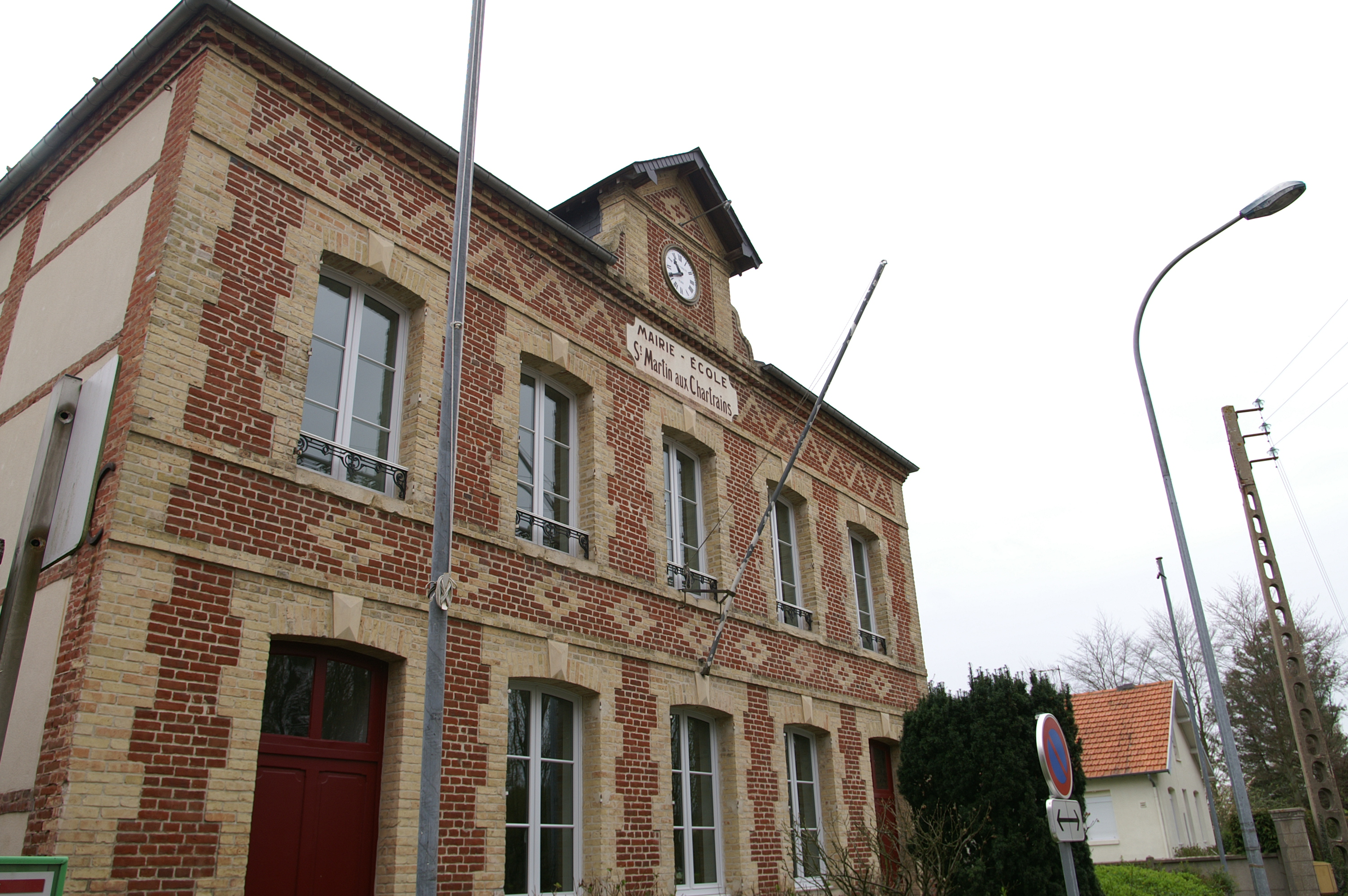
- Town hall

- Coat of arms
- Location of Saint-Martin-aux-Chartrains
- Location within France Location within Normandy
- Coordinates: 49°18′30″N 0°09′18″E
- Country: France
- Region: Normandy
- Department: Calvados
- Arrondissement: Lisieux
- Canton: Pont-l'Évêque
- Intercommunality: CC Terre d'Auge

Government
  - Mayor (2020–2026): Thierry De Koninck
- Area^{1}: 5.06 km^{2} (1.95 sq mi)
- Elevation: 13 m (43 ft)
- Highest elevation: 125 m (410 ft)
- Lowest elevation: 3 m (9.8 ft)
- Population (2023): 429
  - Density: 84.8/km^{2} (220/sq mi)
- Time zone: UTC+01:00 (CET)
  - Summer (DST): UTC+02:00 (CEST)
- INSEE/Postal code: 14620 /14130
- ^{1} French Land Register data, which excludes lakes, ponds, glaciers > 1 km^{2} (0.386 sq mi or 247 acres) and river estuaries.

Saint-Martin-aux-Chartrains (French pronunciation: [sɛ̃ maʁtɛ̃ o ʃaʁtʁɛ̃]) is a commune in the Calvados department in the Normandy region in northwestern France.

== Population ==
Historical population
Year	Pop.	±% p.a.
1968	262	—
1975	249	−0.72%
1982	309	+3.13%
1990	369	+2.24%
1999	351	−0.55%
2007	386	+1.20%
2012	400	+0.72%
2017	412	+0.59%
2023	429	+0.68%
Source: INSEE

== See also ==
- Communes of the Calvados department
