= Le Faulq =

- Commune
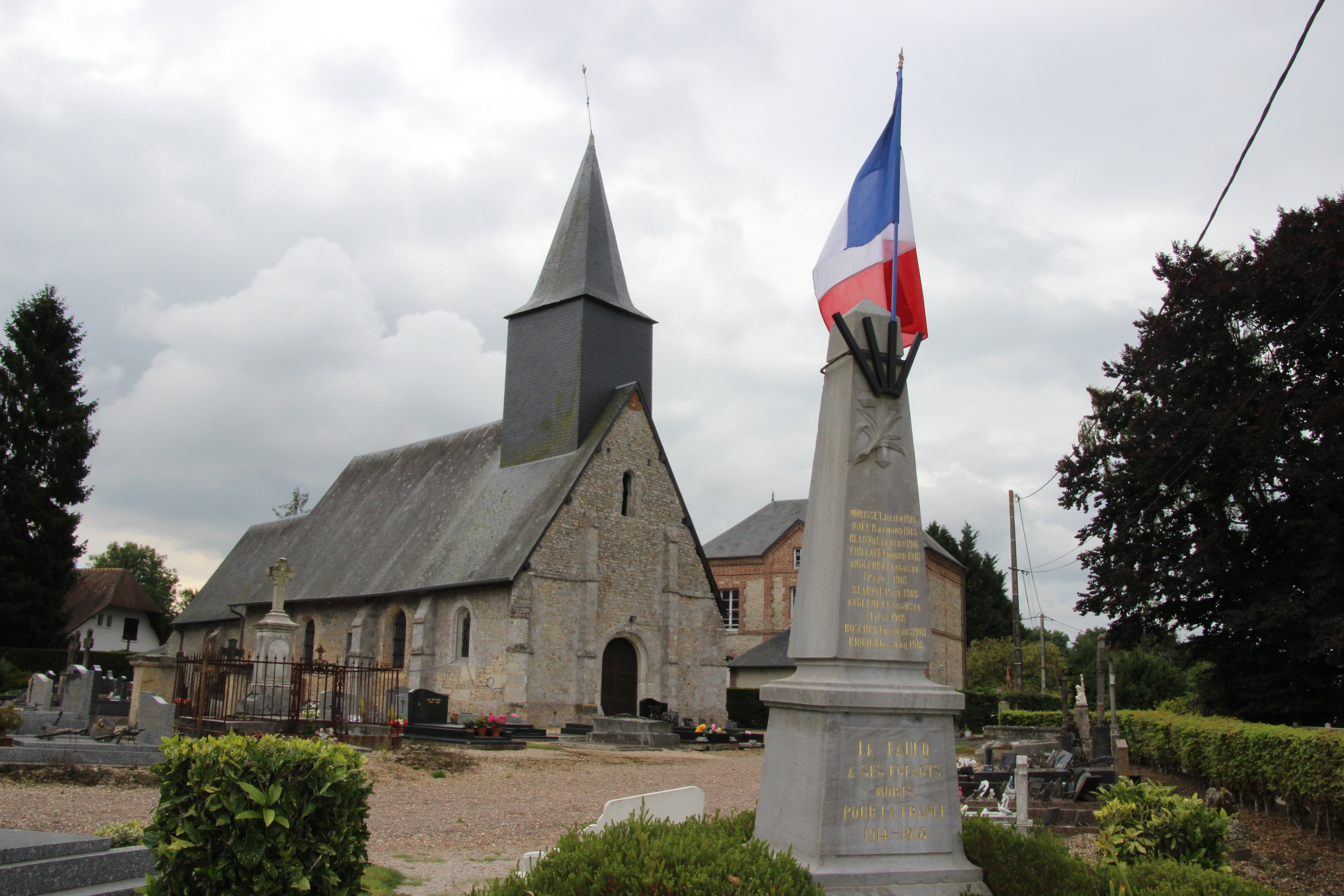
- The church in Le Faulq
- Location of Le Faulq
- Location within France Location within Normandy
- Coordinates: 49°13′53″N 0°19′10″E
- Country: France
- Region: Normandy
- Department: Calvados
- Arrondissement: Lisieux
- Canton: Pont-l'Évêque
- Intercommunality: CC Terre d'Auge

Government
  - Mayor (2020–2026): Bruno Lethuillier
- Area^{1}: 4.45 km^{2} (1.72 sq mi)
- Elevation: 154 m (505 ft)
- Highest elevation: 165 m (541 ft)
- Lowest elevation: 89 m (292 ft)
- Population (2023): 319
  - Density: 71.7/km^{2} (186/sq mi)
- Time zone: UTC+01:00 (CET)
  - Summer (DST): UTC+02:00 (CEST)
- INSEE/Postal code: 14261 /14130
- ^{1} French Land Register data, which excludes lakes, ponds, glaciers > 1 km^{2} (0.386 sq mi or 247 acres) and river estuaries.

Le Faulq (French pronunciation: [lə fo]) is a commune in the Calvados department in the Normandy region in northwestern France.

== Population ==
Historical population
Year	Pop.	±% p.a.
1968	125	—
1975	113	−1.43%
1982	153	+4.42%
1990	201	+3.47%
1999	204	+0.16%
2007	279	+3.99%
2012	342	+4.16%
2017	343	+0.06%
2023	319	−1.20%
Source: INSEE

== See also ==
- Communes of the Calvados department
