= Moyaux =

- Commune
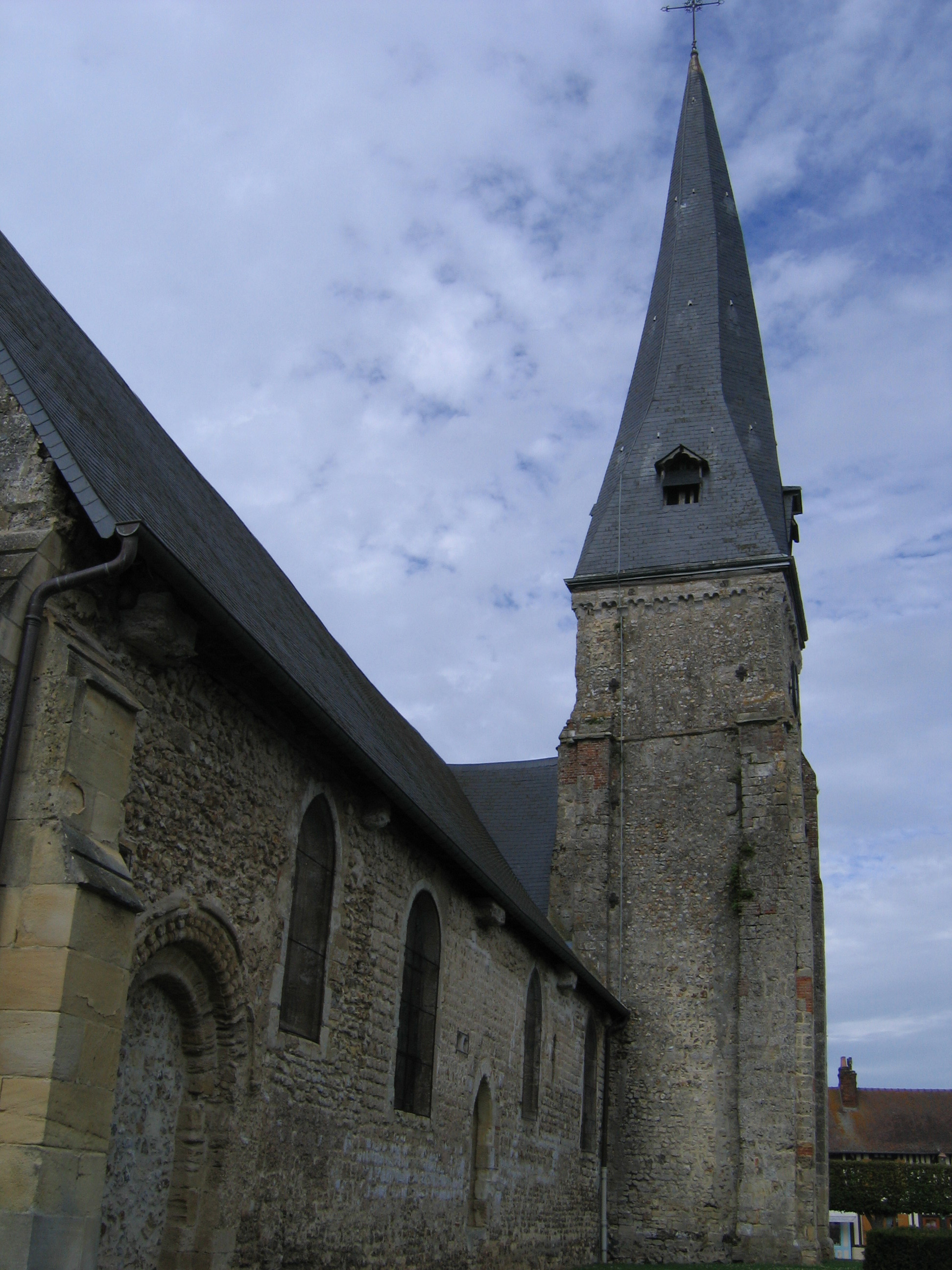
- The church in Moyaux
- Location of Moyaux
- Location within France Location within Normandy
- Coordinates: 49°11′46″N 0°21′25″E
- Country: France
- Region: Normandy
- Department: Calvados
- Arrondissement: Lisieux
- Canton: Pont-l'Évêque
- Intercommunality: CA Lisieux Normandie

Government
  - Mayor (2020–2026): Benoît Charbonneau
- Area^{1}: 16.23 km^{2} (6.27 sq mi)
- Elevation: 34 m (112 ft)
- Highest elevation: 171 m (561 ft)
- Lowest elevation: 115 m (377 ft)
- Population (2023): 1,383
  - Density: 85.21/km^{2} (220.7/sq mi)
- Time zone: UTC+01:00 (CET)
  - Summer (DST): UTC+02:00 (CEST)
- INSEE/Postal code: 14460 /14590
- ^{1} French Land Register data, which excludes lakes, ponds, glaciers > 1 km^{2} (0.386 sq mi or 247 acres) and river estuaries.

Moyaux (French pronunciation: [mwajo] or [mɔjo]) is a commune in the Calvados department in the Normandy region in northwestern France.

== Population ==
Historical population
Year	Pop.	±% p.a.
1968	746	—
1975	857	+2.00%
1982	931	+1.19%
1990	1,185	+3.06%
1999	1,235	+0.46%
2007	1,317	+0.81%
2012	1,348	+0.47%
2017	1,359	+0.16%
2023	1,383	+0.29%
Source: INSEE

== See also ==
- Communes of the Calvados department
