= Fierville-les-Parcs =

- Commune
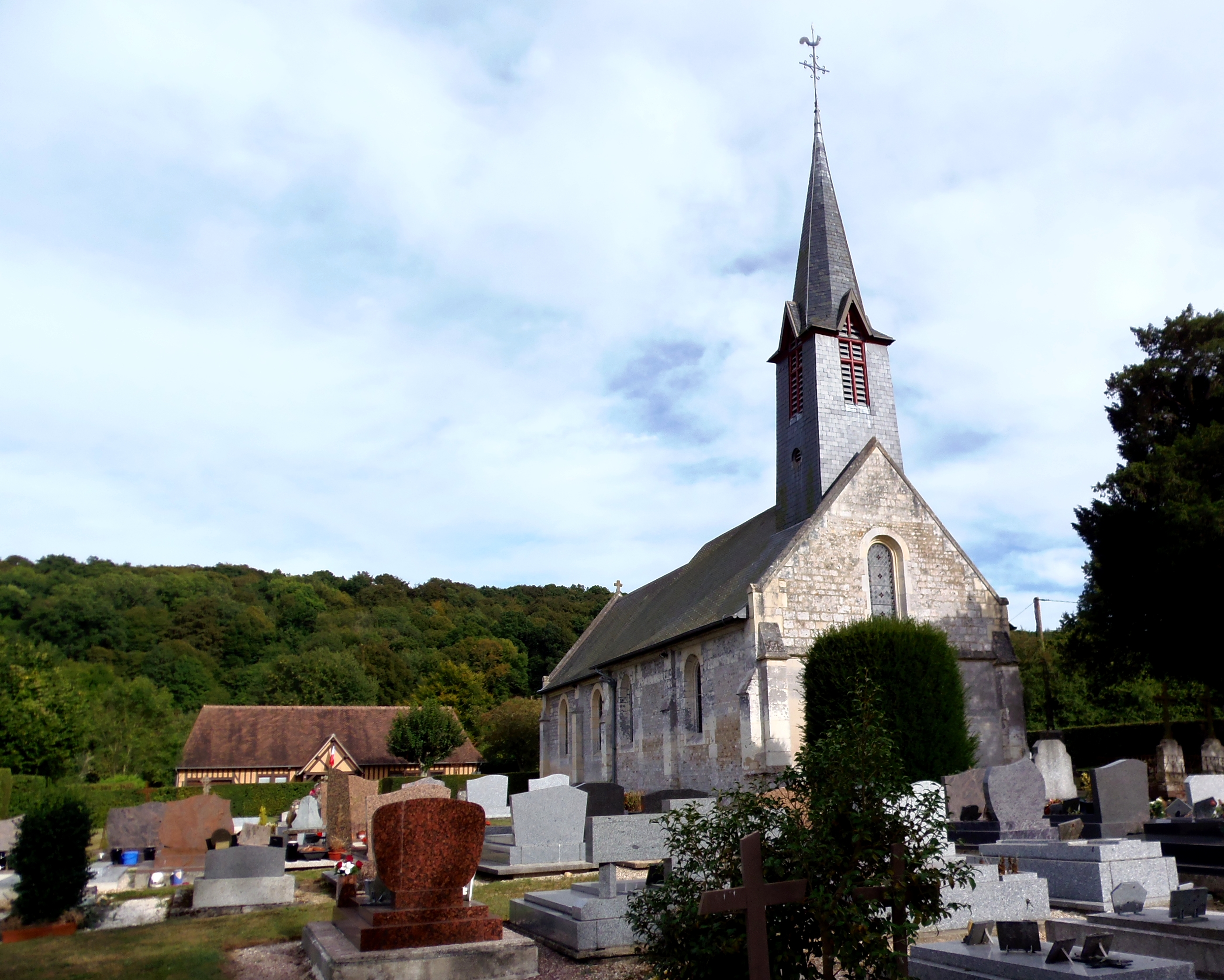
- The church in Fierville-les-Parcs

- Coat of arms
- Location of Fierville-les-Parcs
- Location within France Location within Normandy
- Coordinates: 49°14′35″N 0°13′35″E
- Country: France
- Region: Normandy
- Department: Calvados
- Arrondissement: Lisieux
- Canton: Pont-l'Évêque
- Intercommunality: CC Terre d'Auge

Government
  - Mayor (2020–2026): Christian Larose
- Area^{1}: 4.91 km^{2} (1.90 sq mi)
- Elevation: 23 m (75 ft)
- Highest elevation: 126 m (413 ft)
- Lowest elevation: 17 m (56 ft)
- Population (2023): 237
  - Density: 48.3/km^{2} (125/sq mi)
- Time zone: UTC+01:00 (CET)
  - Summer (DST): UTC+02:00 (CEST)
- INSEE/Postal code: 14269 /14130
- ^{1} French Land Register data, which excludes lakes, ponds, glaciers > 1 km^{2} (0.386 sq mi or 247 acres) and river estuaries.

Fierville-les-Parcs is a commune in the Calvados department. It's situated in the Normandy region of northwestern France.

== Population ==
Historical population
Year	Pop.	±% p.a.
1968	124	—
1975	112	−1.44%
1982	121	+1.11%
1990	135	+1.38%
1999	192	+3.99%
2007	225	+2.00%
2012	218	−0.63%
2017	212	−0.56%
2023	237	+1.88%
Source: INSEE

== See also ==
- Communes of the Calvados department
