= Vieux-Bourg =

- Commune
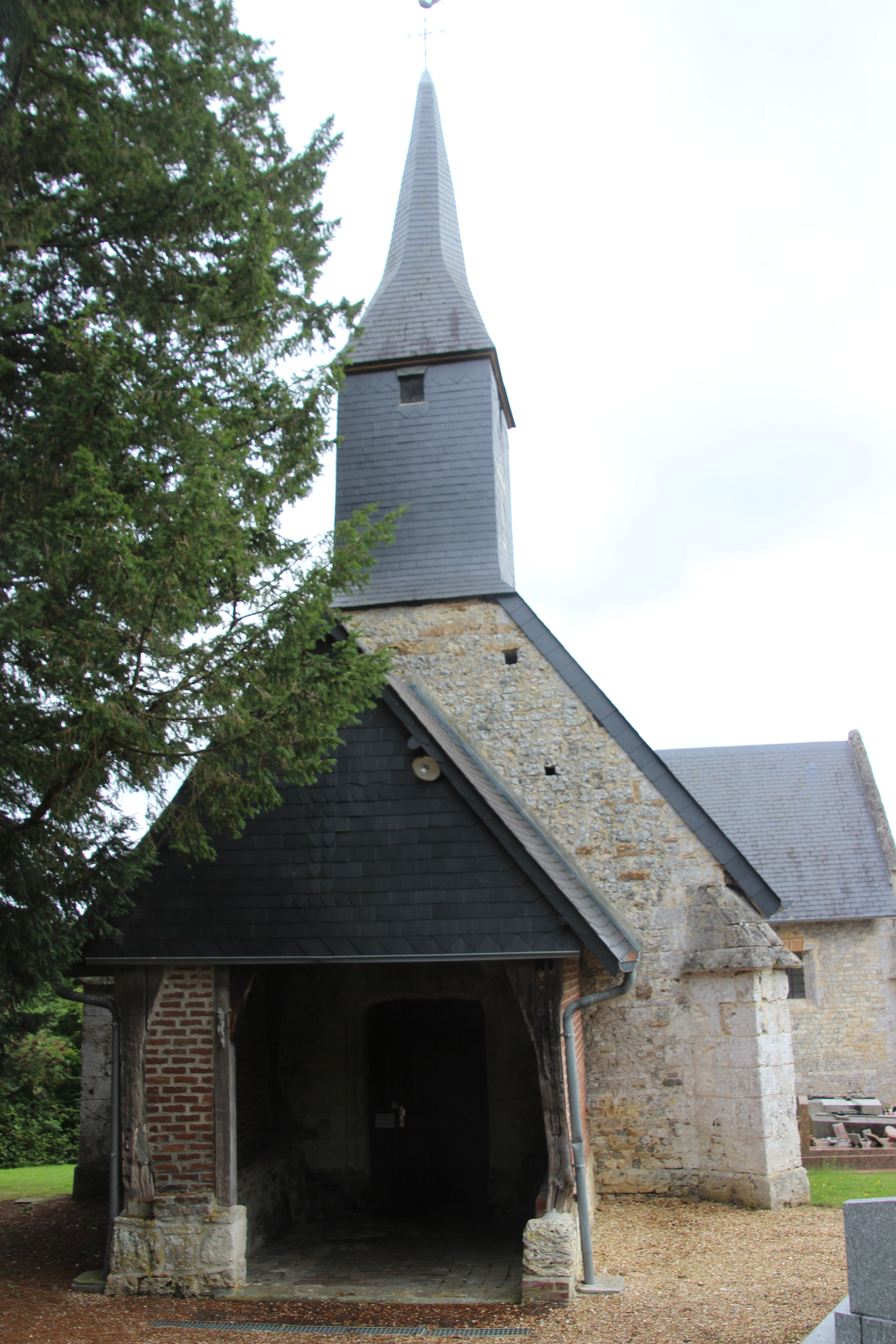
- The church in Vieux-Bourg

- Coat of arms
- Location of Vieux-Bourg
- Location within France Location within Normandy
- Coordinates: 49°18′43″N 0°15′01″E
- Country: France
- Region: Normandy
- Department: Calvados
- Arrondissement: Lisieux
- Canton: Pont-l'Évêque
- Intercommunality: CC Terre d'Auge

Government
  - Mayor (2024–2026): Laurent Desjardins
- Area^{1}: 1.30 km^{2} (0.50 sq mi)
- Elevation: 65 m (213 ft)
- Highest elevation: 135 m (443 ft)
- Lowest elevation: 44 m (144 ft)
- Population (2023): 104
  - Density: 80.0/km^{2} (207/sq mi)
- Time zone: UTC+01:00 (CET)
  - Summer (DST): UTC+02:00 (CEST)
- INSEE/Postal code: 14748 /14130
- ^{1} French Land Register data, which excludes lakes, ponds, glaciers > 1 km^{2} (0.386 sq mi or 247 acres) and river estuaries.

Vieux-Bourg (French pronunciation: [vjø buʁ]) is a commune in the Calvados department in the Normandy region in northwestern France.

== Population ==
Historical population
| Year | Pop. | ±% p.a. |
|---|---|---|
| 1968 | 74 | — |
| 1975 | 76 | +0.38% |
| 1982 | 90 | +2.44% |
| 1990 | 87 | −0.42% |
| 1999 | 74 | −1.78% |
| 2007 | 80 | +0.98% |
| 2012 | 85 | +1.22% |
| 2017 | 78 | −1.70% |
| 2023 | 104 | +4.91% |
Source: INSEE

== See also ==
- Communes of the Calvados department
