= Le Torquesne =

- Commune
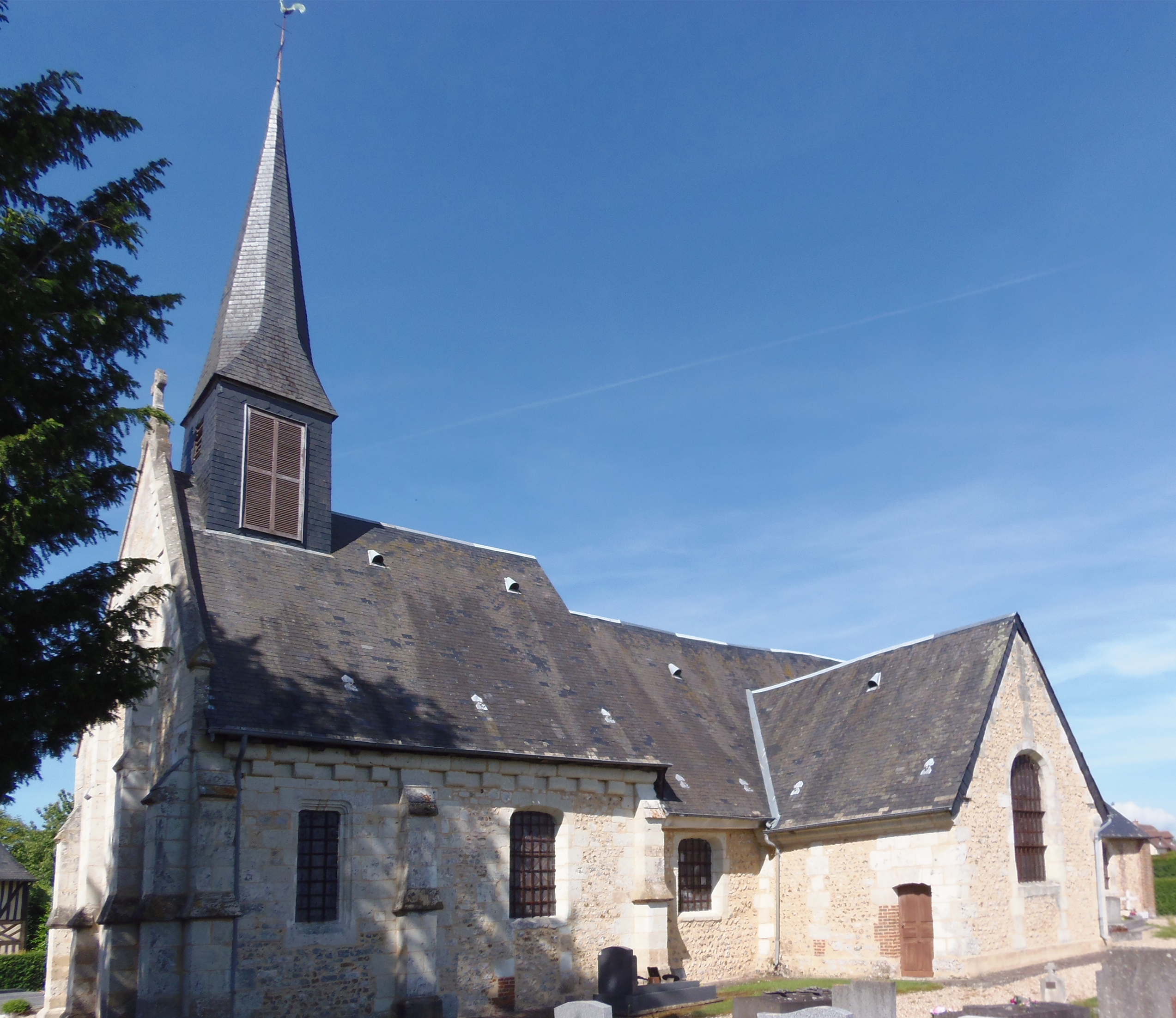
- The Notre-Dame church
- Location of Le Torquesne
- Location within France Location within Normandy
- Coordinates: 49°13′06″N 0°10′07″E
- Country: France
- Region: Normandy
- Department: Calvados
- Arrondissement: Lisieux
- Canton: Pont-l'Évêque
- Intercommunality: CC Terre d'Auge

Government
  - Mayor (2020–2026): Sylvain Marie
- Area^{1}: 5.26 km^{2} (2.03 sq mi)
- Elevation: 140 m (460 ft)
- Highest elevation: 147 m (482 ft)
- Lowest elevation: 93 m (305 ft)
- Population (2023): 529
  - Density: 101/km^{2} (260/sq mi)
- Time zone: UTC+01:00 (CET)
  - Summer (DST): UTC+02:00 (CEST)
- INSEE/Postal code: 14694 /14130
- ^{1} French Land Register data, which excludes lakes, ponds, glaciers > 1 km^{2} (0.386 sq mi or 247 acres) and river estuaries.

Le Torquesne (French pronunciation: [lə tɔʁkɛn]) is a commune in the Calvados department in the Normandy region in northwestern France.

== Population ==
Historical population
Year	Pop.	±% p.a.
1968	204	—
1975	155	−3.85%
1982	205	+4.07%
1990	245	+2.25%
1999	301	+2.31%
2007	409	+3.91%
2012	460	+2.38%
2017	509	+2.05%
2023	529	+0.64%
Source: INSEE

== See also ==
- Communes of the Calvados department
