= Saint-Benoît-d'Hébertot =

- Commune
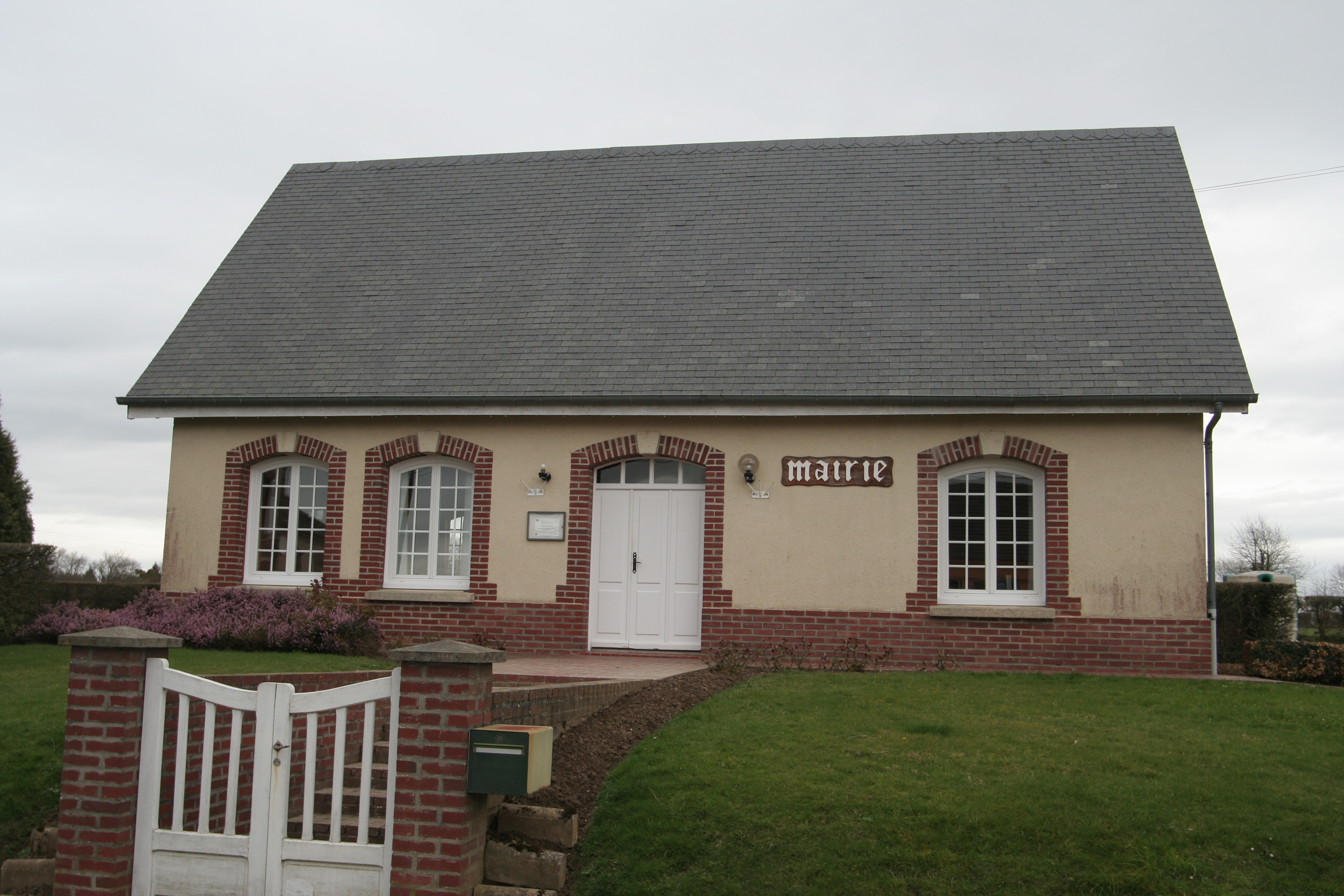
- The town hall in Saint-Benoît-d'Hébertot
- Location of Saint-Benoît-d'Hébertot
- Location within France Location within Normandy
- Coordinates: 49°19′03″N 0°16′13″E
- Country: France
- Region: Normandy
- Department: Calvados
- Arrondissement: Lisieux
- Canton: Pont-l'Évêque
- Intercommunality: CC Terre d'Auge

Government
  - Mayor (2020–2026): Delphine Carval-Boulanger
- Area^{1}: 7.13 km^{2} (2.75 sq mi)
- Elevation: 9 m (30 ft)
- Highest elevation: 148 m (486 ft)
- Lowest elevation: 50 m (160 ft)
- Population (2023): 446
  - Density: 62.6/km^{2} (162/sq mi)
- Time zone: UTC+01:00 (CET)
  - Summer (DST): UTC+02:00 (CEST)
- INSEE/Postal code: 14563 /14130
- ^{1} French Land Register data, which excludes lakes, ponds, glaciers > 1 km^{2} (0.386 sq mi or 247 acres) and river estuaries.

Saint-Benoît-d'Hébertot (French pronunciation: [sɛ̃ bənwa debɛʁto]) is a commune in the Calvados department in the Normandy region in northwestern France.

== Population ==
Historical population
Year	Pop.	±% p.a.
1968	240	—
1975	266	+1.48%
1982	243	−1.28%
1990	286	+2.06%
1999	293	+0.27%
2007	332	+1.57%
2012	389	+3.22%
2017	425	+1.79%
2023	446	+0.81%
Source: INSEE

== See also ==
- Communes of the Calvados department
