= Manneville-la-Pipard =

- Commune
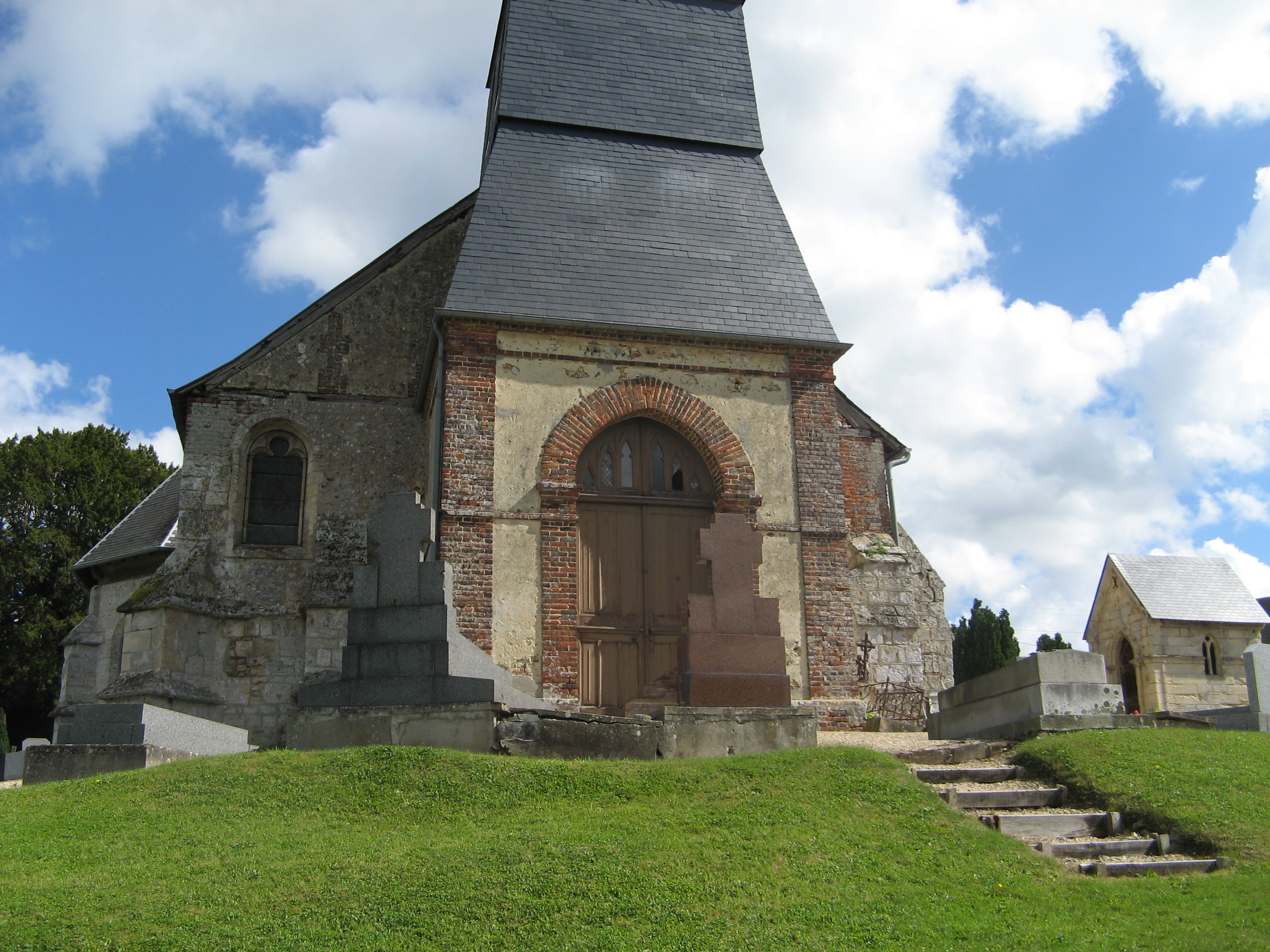
- The church in Manneville-la-Pipard
- Location of Manneville-la-Pipard
- Location within France Location within Normandy
- Coordinates: 49°15′45″N 0°13′16″E
- Country: France
- Region: Normandy
- Department: Calvados
- Arrondissement: Lisieux
- Canton: Pont-l'Évêque
- Intercommunality: CC Terre d'Auge

Government
  - Mayor (2020–2026): Jean-Louis Lefrancois
- Area^{1}: 6.31 km^{2} (2.44 sq mi)
- Elevation: 19 m (62 ft)
- Highest elevation: 149 m (489 ft)
- Lowest elevation: 12 m (39 ft)
- Population (2023): 257
  - Density: 40.7/km^{2} (105/sq mi)
- Time zone: UTC+01:00 (CET)
  - Summer (DST): UTC+02:00 (CEST)
- INSEE/Postal code: 14399 /14130
- ^{1} French Land Register data, which excludes lakes, ponds, glaciers > 1 km^{2} (0.386 sq mi or 247 acres) and river estuaries.

Manneville-la-Pipard (French pronunciation: [manvil la pipaʁ]) is a commune in the Calvados department in the Normandy region in northwestern France.

== Population ==
Historical population
Year	Pop.	±% p.a.
1968	236	—
1975	213	−1.45%
1982	290	+4.51%
1990	317	+1.12%
1999	348	+1.04%
2007	318	−1.12%
2012	318	+0.00%
2017	290	−1.83%
2023	257	−1.99%
Source: INSEE

== See also ==
- Communes of the Calvados department
