= Mont Canisy battery =

WW2 German fortification in Calvados, Normandy, France

- Part of Atlantic Wall
- Normandy, France
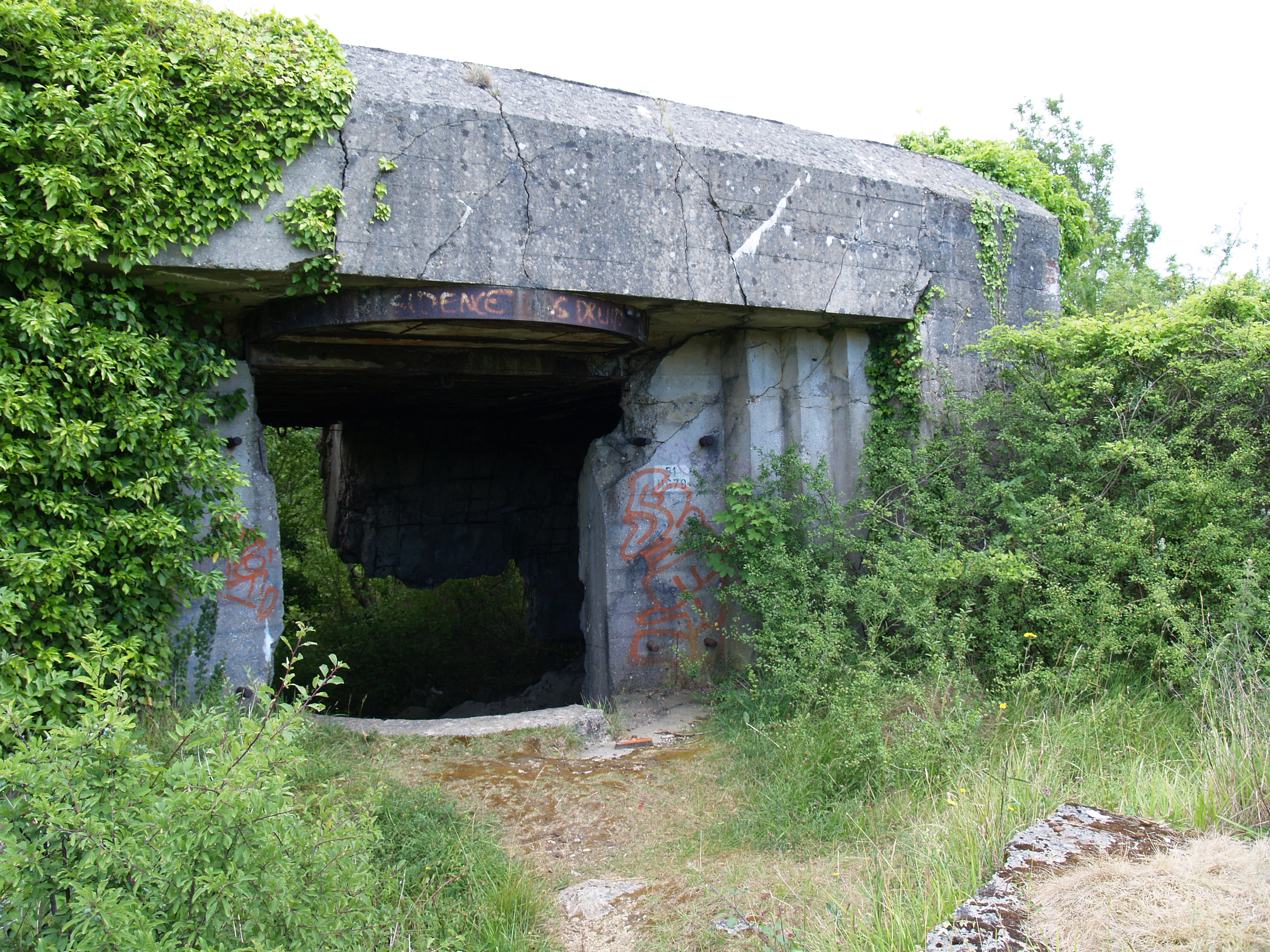
- Casemate for 155mm artillery at Mont Canisy

Location
- Coordinates: 49°20′27″N 0°02′24″E

Site history
- Built: 1941
- Built by: Organisation Todt
- In use: 1944
- Materials: Concrete and steel
- Battles/wars: Invasion of Normandy

Garrison information
- Garrison: 1255 Heeres-Küsten-Artillerie-Abteilung (HKAA)

The Mont Canisy battery was a World War II German artillery battery constructed close to the French village of Benerville-sur-Mer in the Calvados department in the Lower Normandy region. Located on the highest ground in Normandy (110 m (360 ft) high), the vantage point overlooks the Côte Fleurie. The bunker complex was constructed between 1941 and 1944 to protect the River Seine estuary and the port of Le Havre. It was a large artillery bunker complex between Cherbourg and Le Havre (the largest being the Maisy Battery complex with its 6 x 155mm French guns at Le Perruques); 4 x 105's at La Martiniere; 4 x 150mm's at Foucher's farm). The battery is 8 km (5.0 mi) east of the Houlgate battery.

A French naval coastal battery was on the site from 1935 to 1940. In 1940 the guns were put out of action before the site was captured by advancing German troops in 1940.

Much of the site is now a nature reserve and the bunker complex is open to the public and guided tours take place throughout the summer.

== French battery ==
In late 1938 the French army installed four 138mm cannons at the battery and in January 1940 three 75mm guns were added. The battery was evacuated on 14 June 1940 and the German army later occupied the strategic position.

== Construction ==
The Germans built the twenty-five hectare bunker complex (designated Widerstandsnest WN Vill 013 - resistance nest or strongpoint) in 1942 to house six captured French First World War-vintage 155mm cannons. In January 1944, two casemates were constructed to protect two artillery pieces from Allied bombing of the site. The complex featured several casemates, 25 ammunition bunkers, 25 barracks, defensive mortar pits and Tobruks fitted with machine guns and a post fire control bunker all linked by 250 metres of tunnels.

== Garrison ==
The battery was garrisoned by the 2nd Company of the 1255 Heeres-Küsten-Artillerie-Abteilung (HKAA).

== D-Day and Normandy landings ==
By the time of the Normandy landing in June 1944, only four cannons remained, two in casemates. On D-Day, 6 June 1944, HMS Warspite (03), Ramillies and HMS Roberts engaged the bunker complex at Mont Canisy. However, the German guns could not reach the warships and it was determined that they were not a threat to the landing beach at Sword either (24 km (15 mi) distant). As the Allies advanced out of Normandy, the Germans evacuated the bunker complex on 21 August 1944 without a fight.

== Gallery of bunker photographs ==
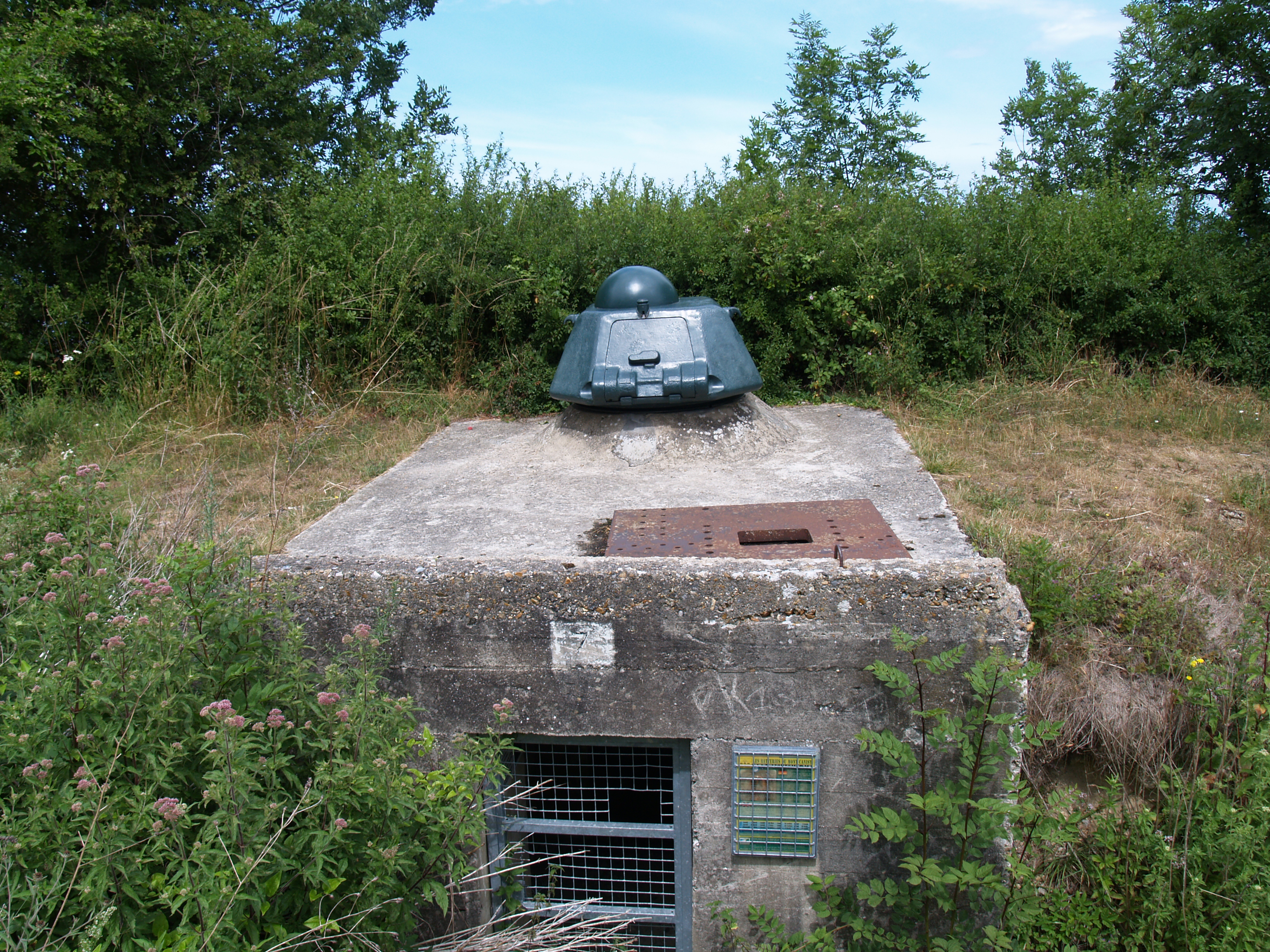
Defensive Tobruk position

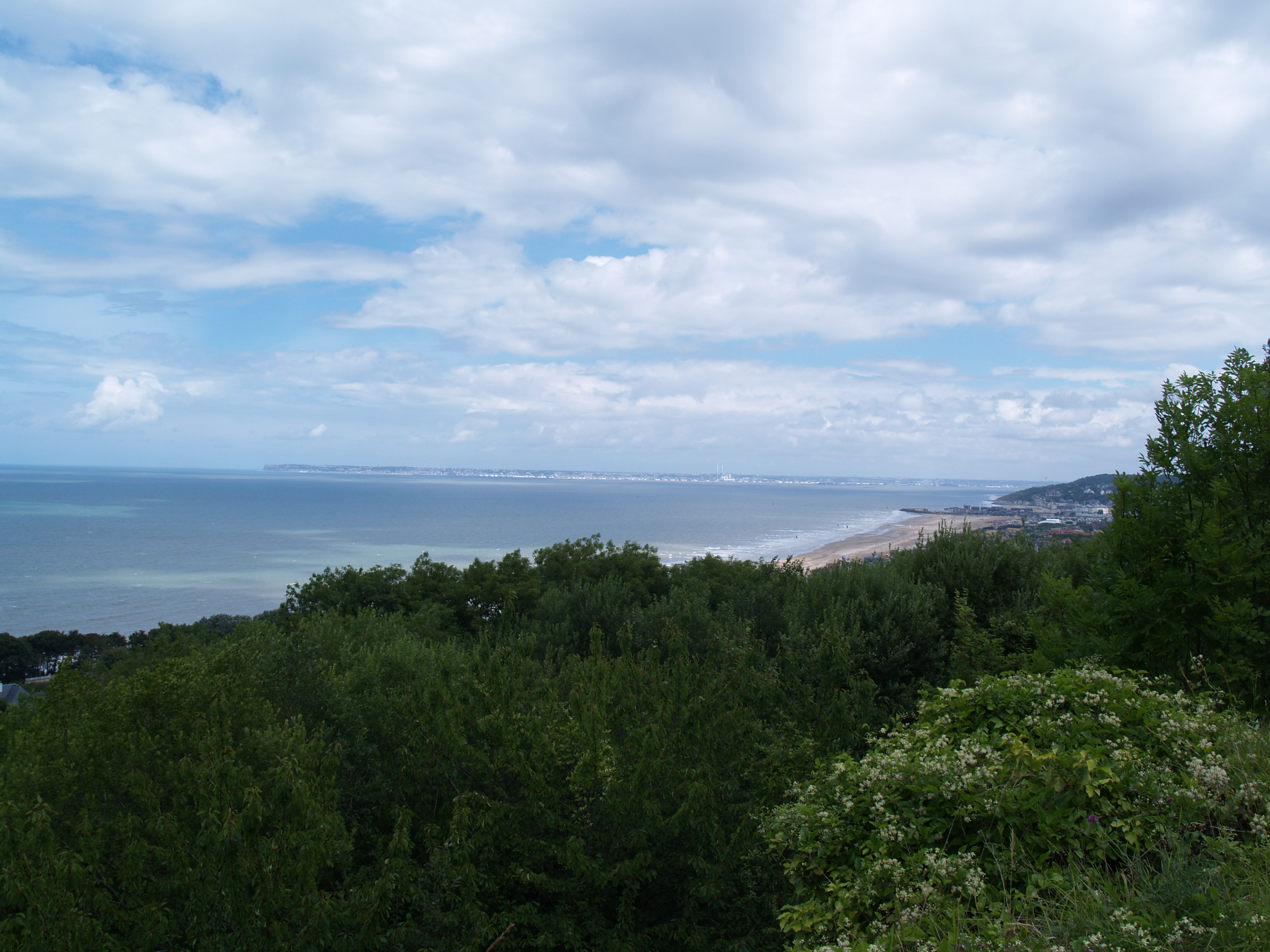
View from Mont Caisn towards Le Harve

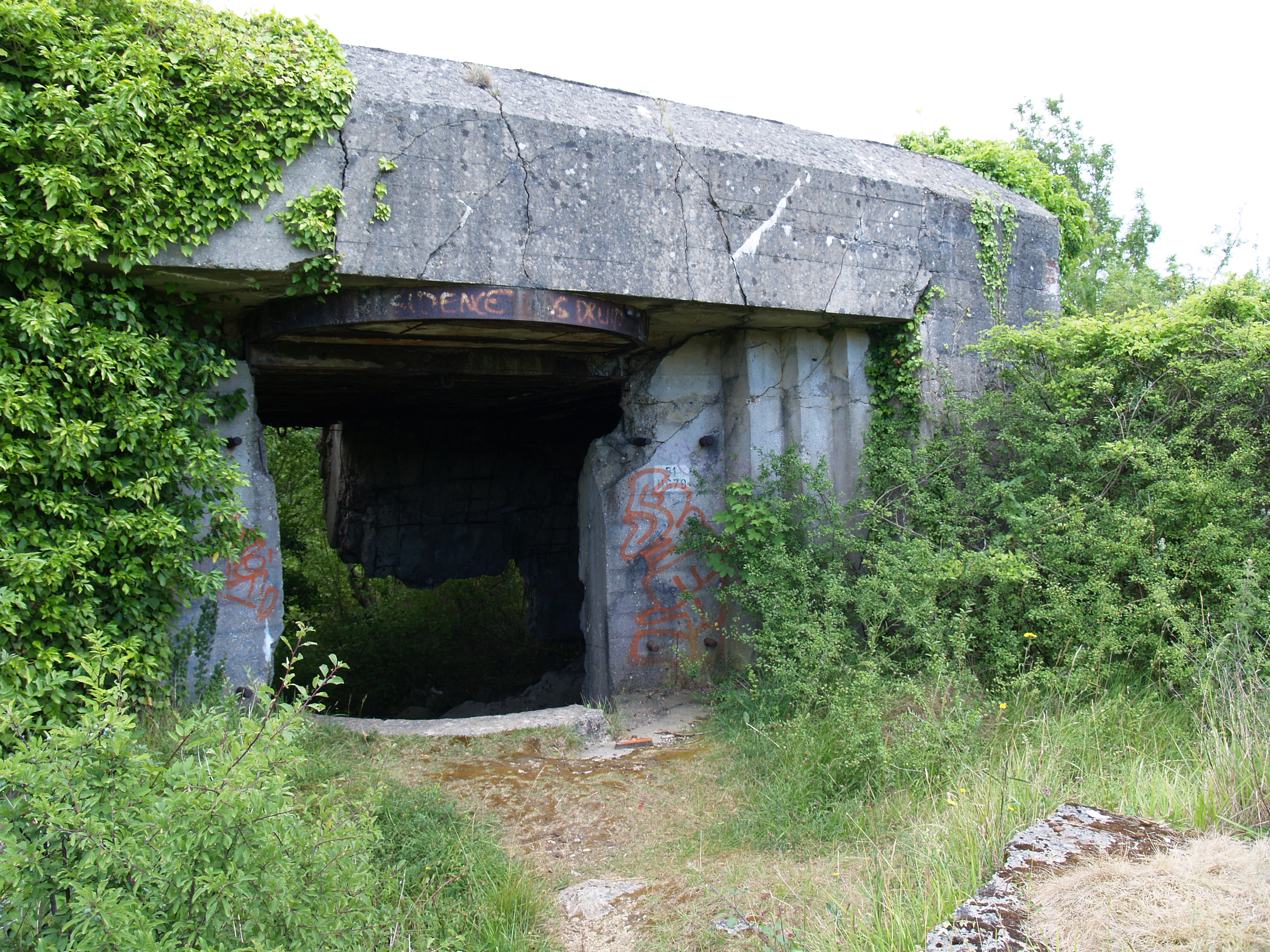
Casemate for 155mm artillery

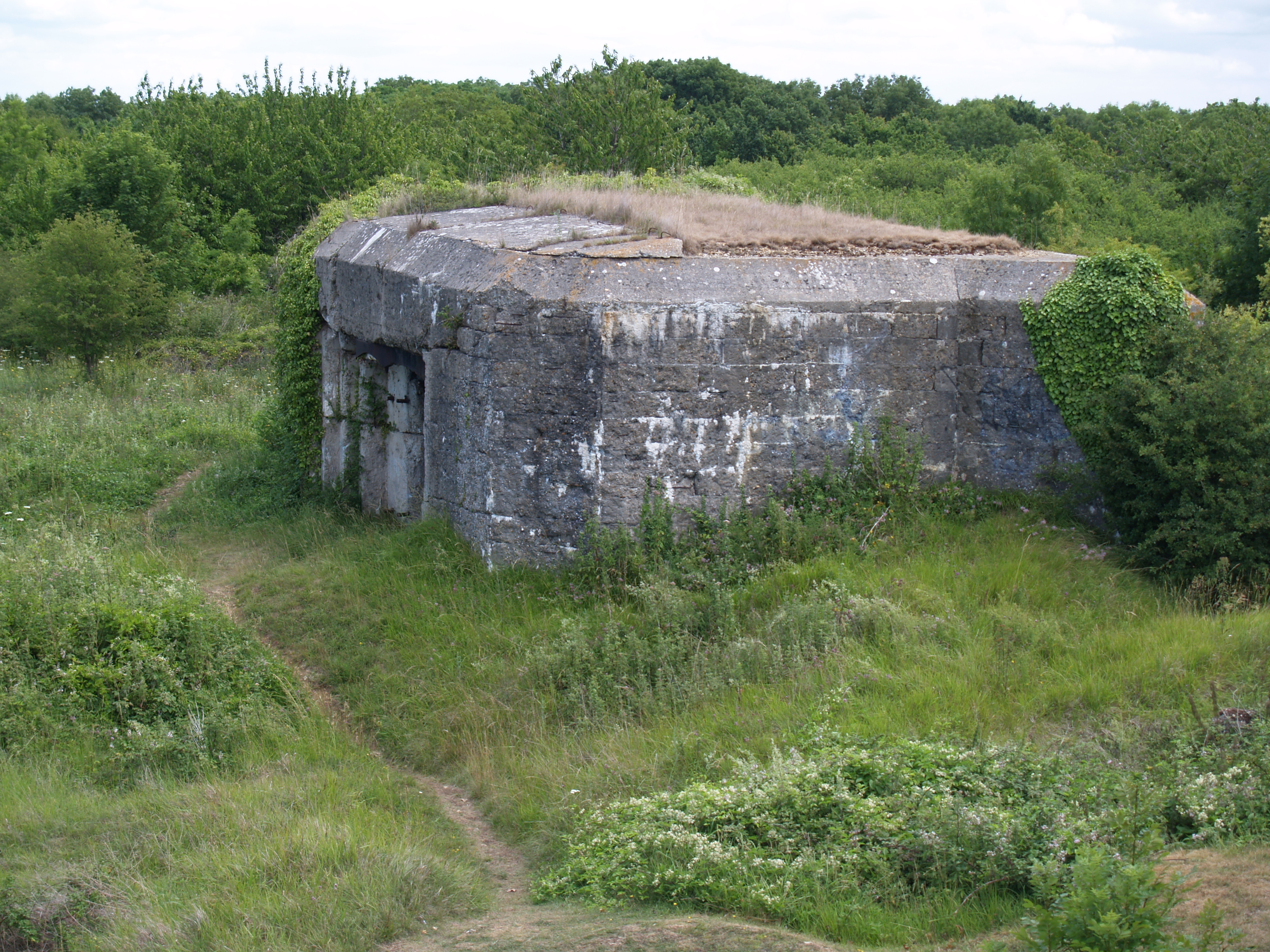
Casemate at Mont Caisy battery

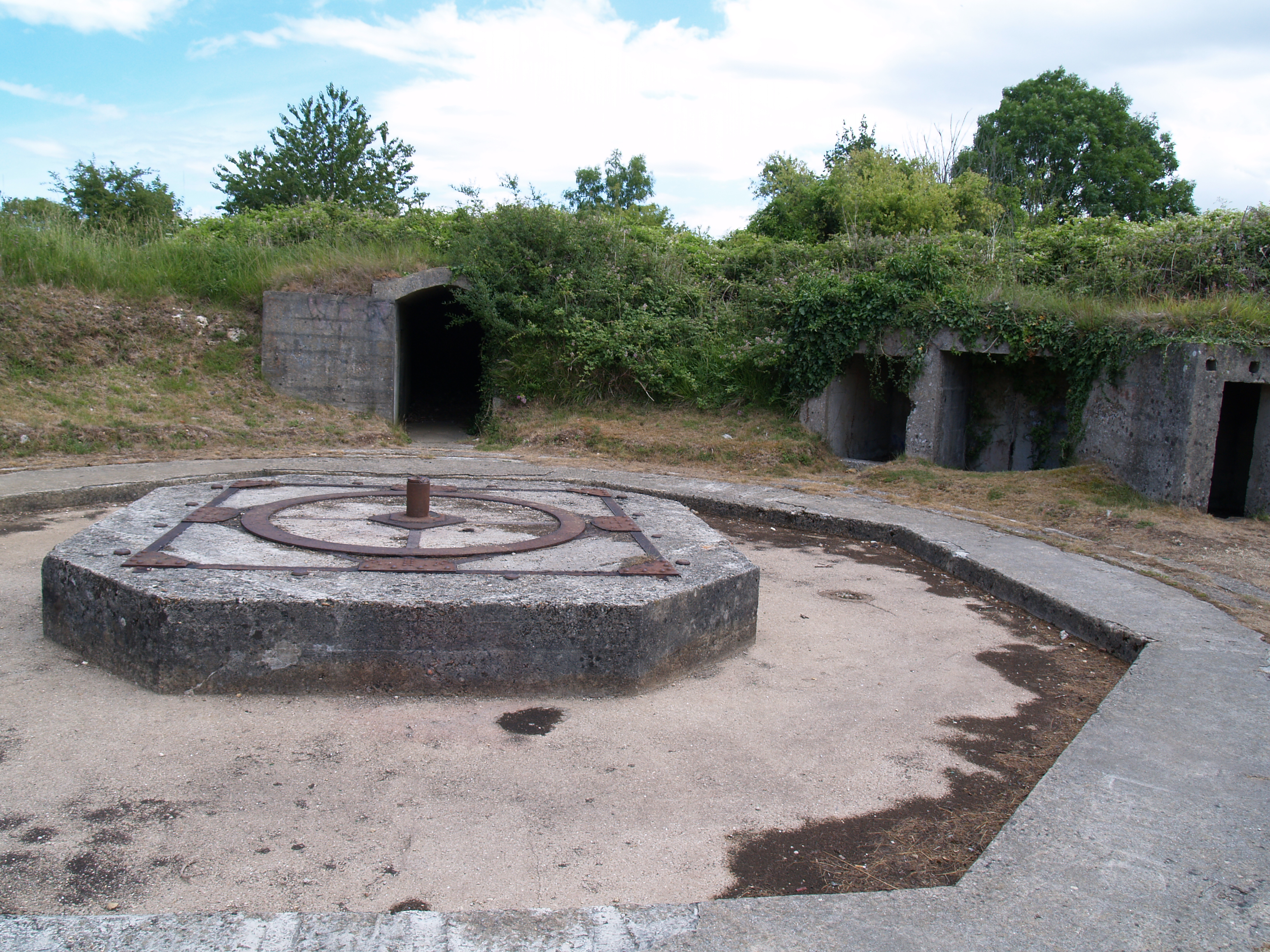
Open position for 155mm artillery with bunker storage behind

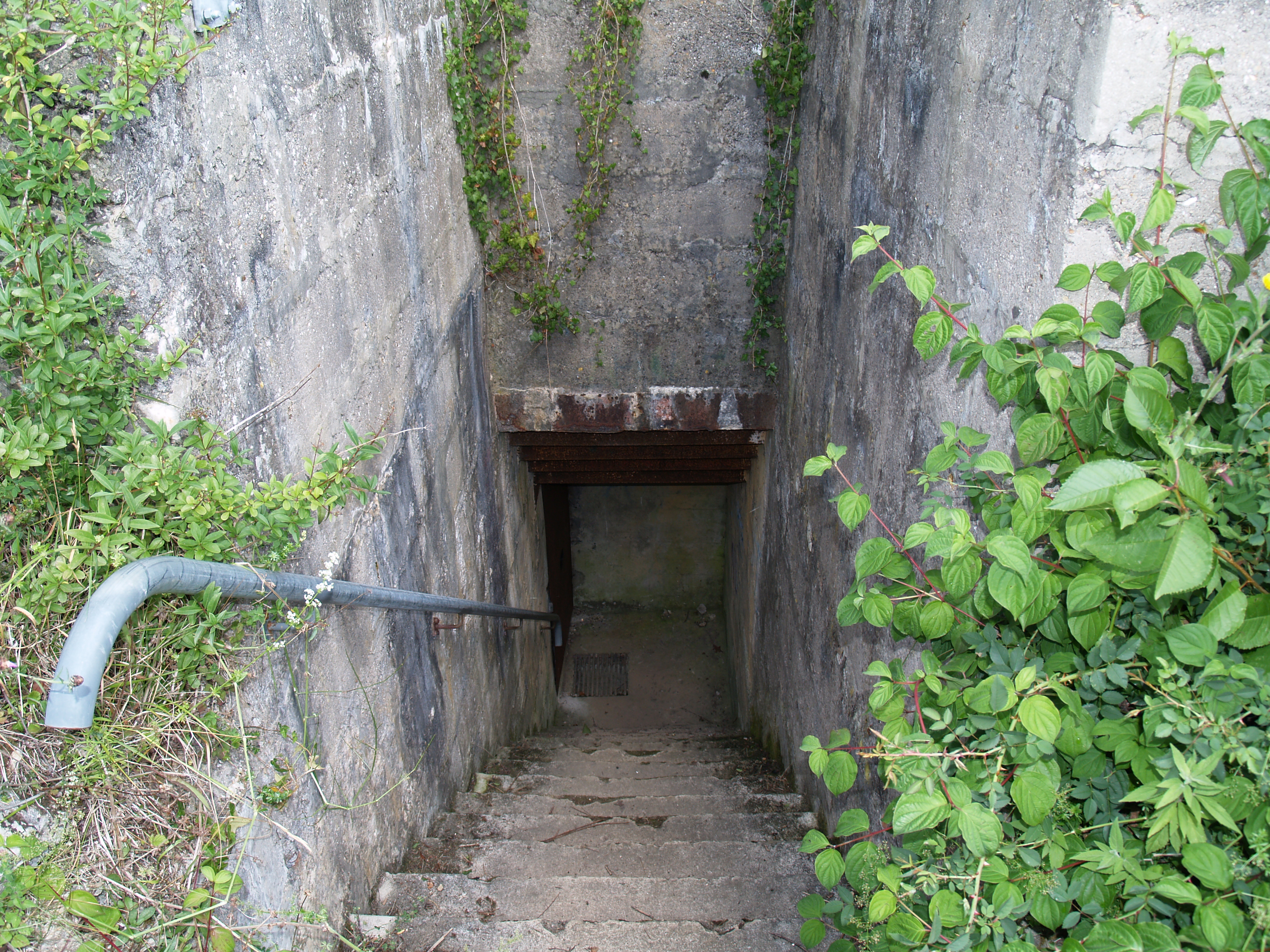
Steps leading to bunker 15m underground

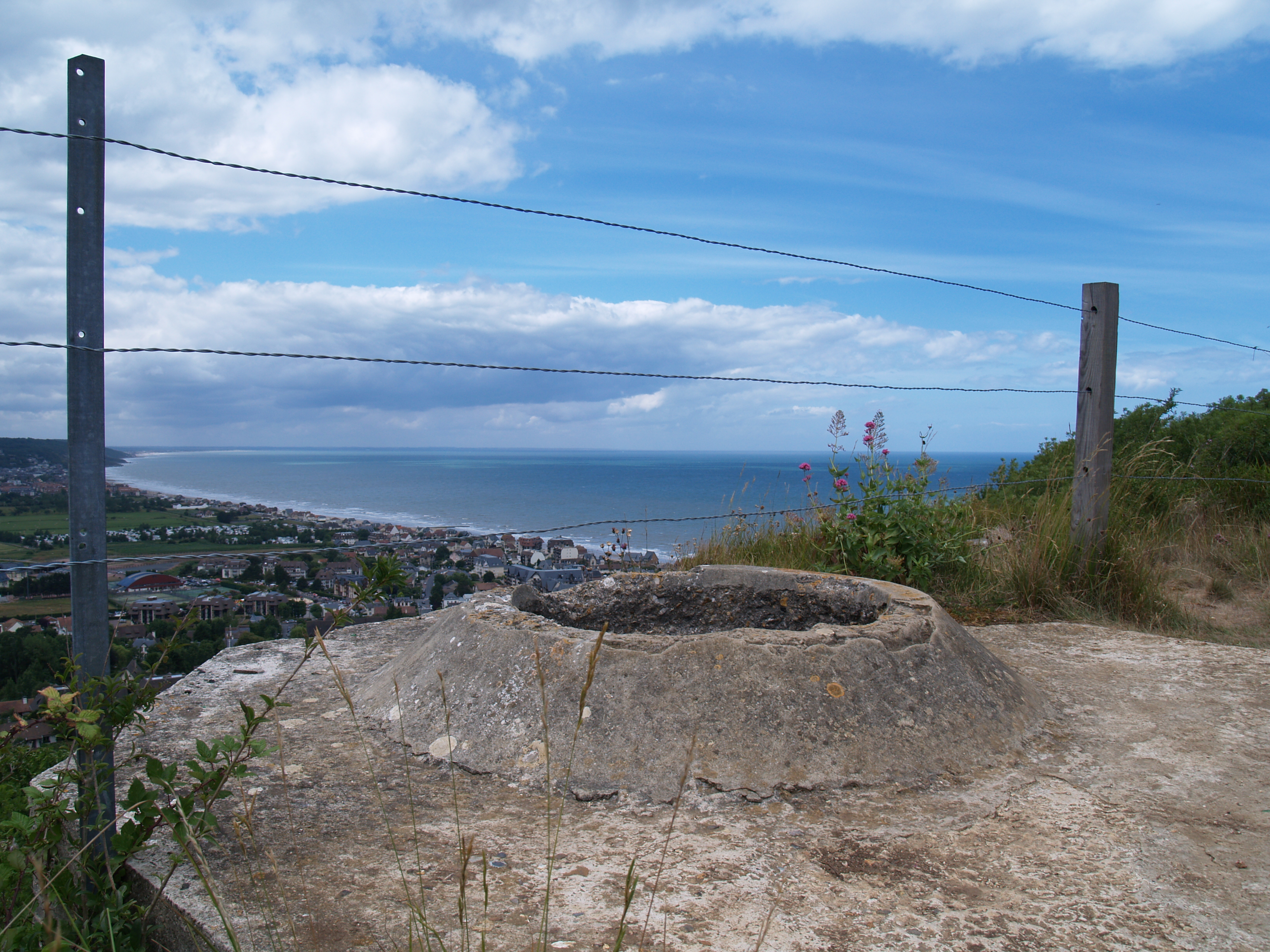
Machine gun Tobruk
