= Vauville =

Vauville may refer to the following communes in France:

- Vauville, Calvados
- Vauville, Manche
