= Côte Fleurie =

Coastline in France

Coordinates: 49°19′N 0°0′E

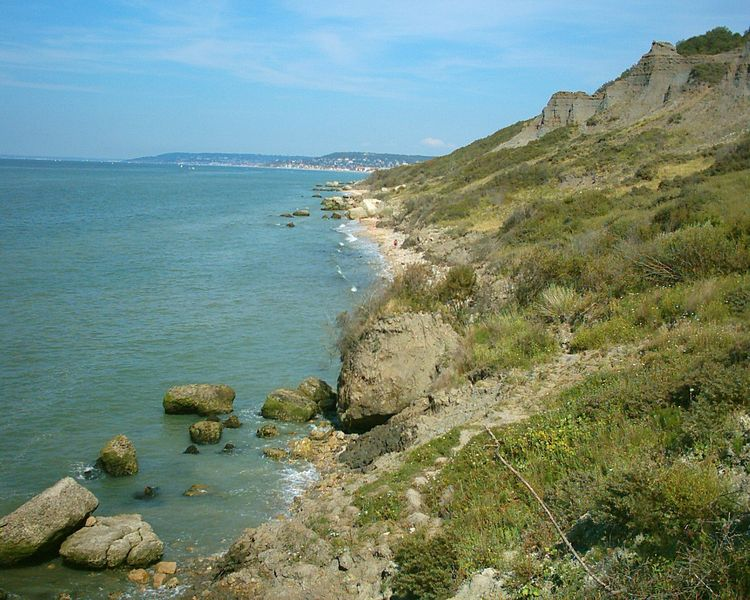
Falaises des Vaches Noires on the Côte Fleurie.

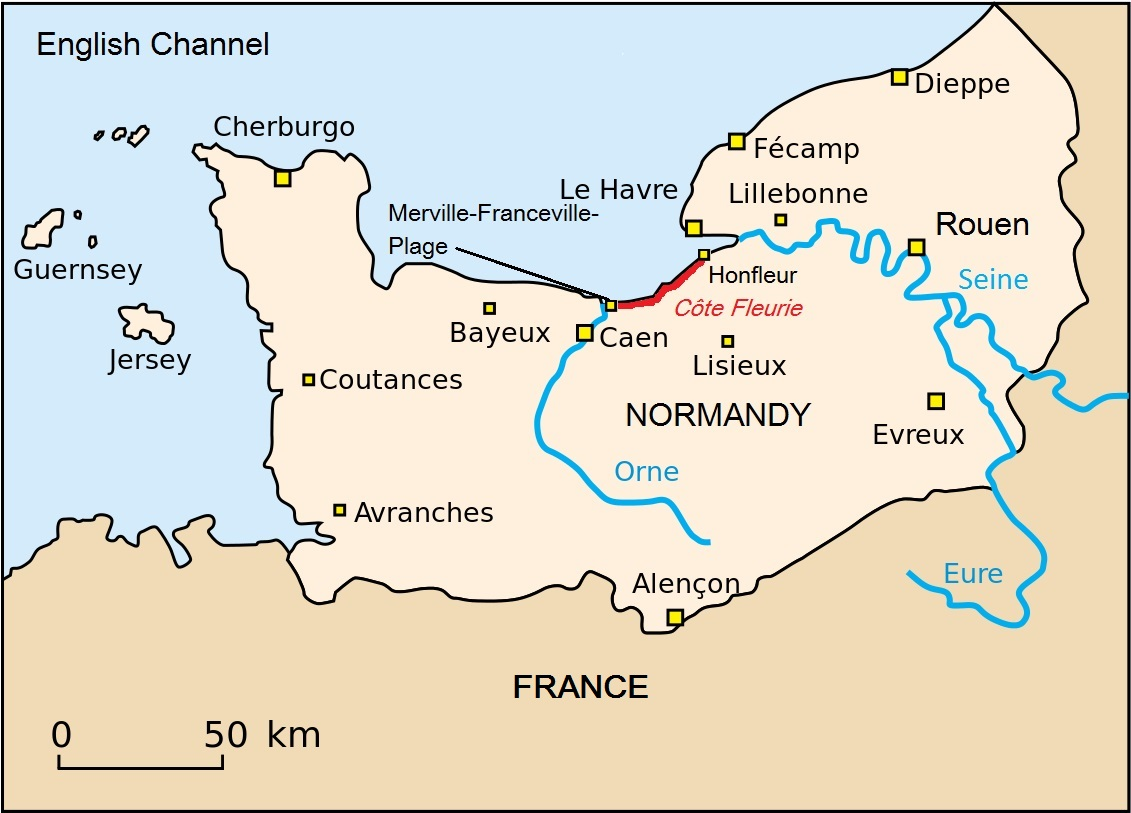
Location of the Côte Fleurie on the Normandy coast.

The Côte Fleurie (French pronunciation: [kot flœ.ʁi]) (or Flowery Coast) stretches for approximately 40 km (25 mi) between Merville-Franceville-Plage, at the mouth of the Orne river, opposite Ouistreham to the west and Honfleur on the Seine estuary in the east. It forms part of the eastern Basse-Normandie (Lower Normandy) coast on the English Channel to the north of the Pays d'Auge in the Calvados department. The coast between the towns of Trouville and Honfleur, although part of the Côte Fleurie, is named Côte de Grace. Dives-sur-Mer is on the Côte Fleurie but possesses no beach or seafront. The Côte de Nacre continues west from the Touques estuary.

The name was given in 1903 by Raymond Coustant de Yanville, president of the regional horticultural society, to the flowered countryside lying beyond the coastal hills and to the gardens of the 19th-century seafront villas built during the Belle Époque. With the development of tourism in the late 19th and early 20th centuries, the French coastline was split into various names to distinguish their varying landscapes (see map). The coastline had a number of long sandy beaches separated by low cliffs and two river valleys; the Vallées de la Dives and the Vallée de la Touques.

From east to west, the coast's main towns and villages are:

- Honfleur
- Villerville
- Trouville-sur-Mer
- Deauville
- Bénerville-sur-Mer
- Tourgéville
- Blonville-sur-Mer
- Villers-sur-Mer
- Houlgate
- Dives-sur-Mer
- Cabourg
- La Home-Varaville
- Merville-Franceville-Plage
- Sallenelles

== Second World War ==
The area was liberated by the Brigade Piron in September 1944.

== Gallery ==
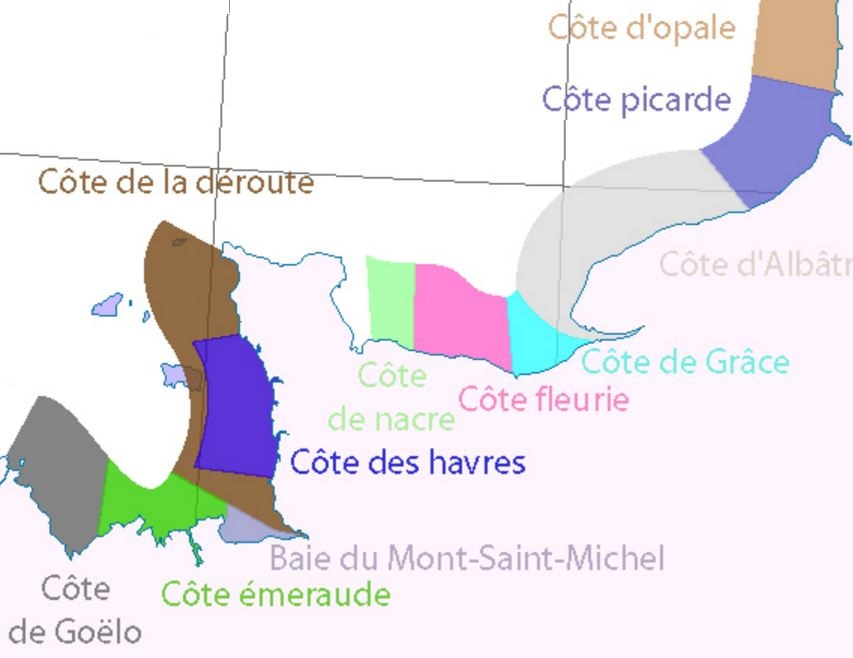
The various "Côtes" (coastal names) in Normandy.

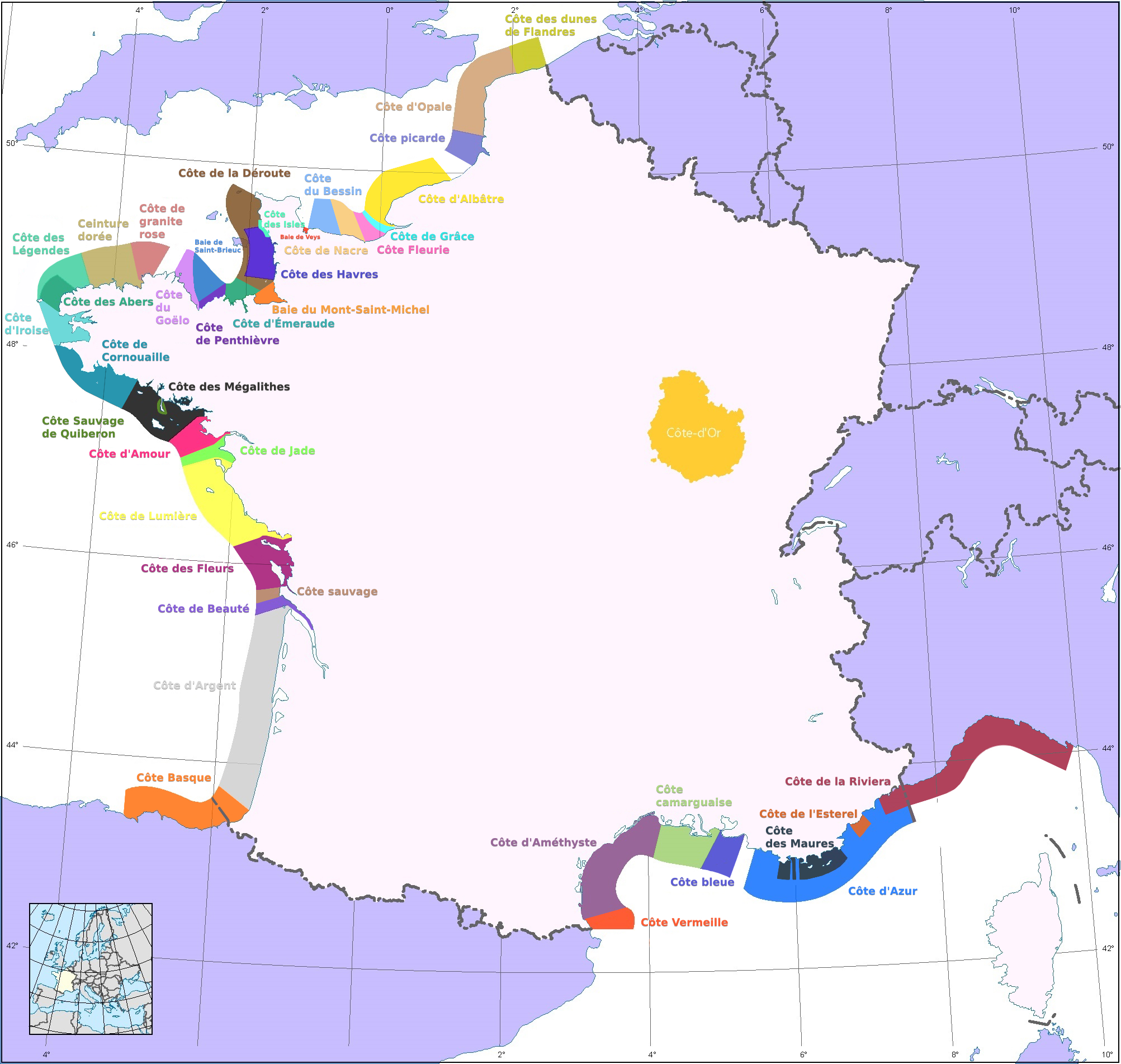
Map of the "Côtes" (coastal names) of France.

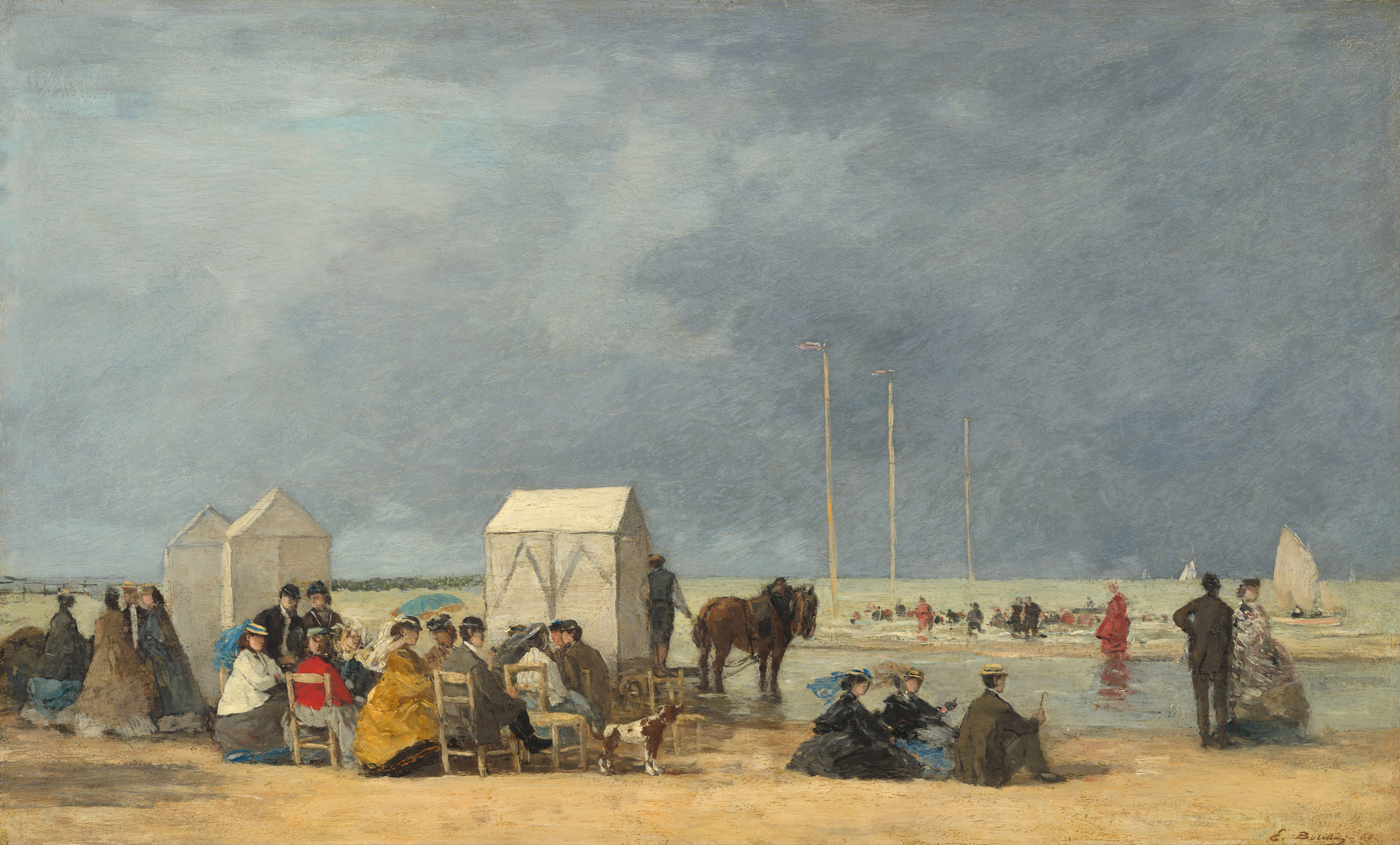
Deauville, by Eugène Boudin.
