= Haguenauer =

Haguenauer is a surname. Notable people with the surname include:

- Jean-Louis Haguenauer (born 1954), French classical pianist
- Michel Haguenauer (1916–2000), French international table tennis player
- Romain Haguenauer (born 1976), French ice dancing coach, choreographer, and former competitor
