= Tourgéville =

- Commune
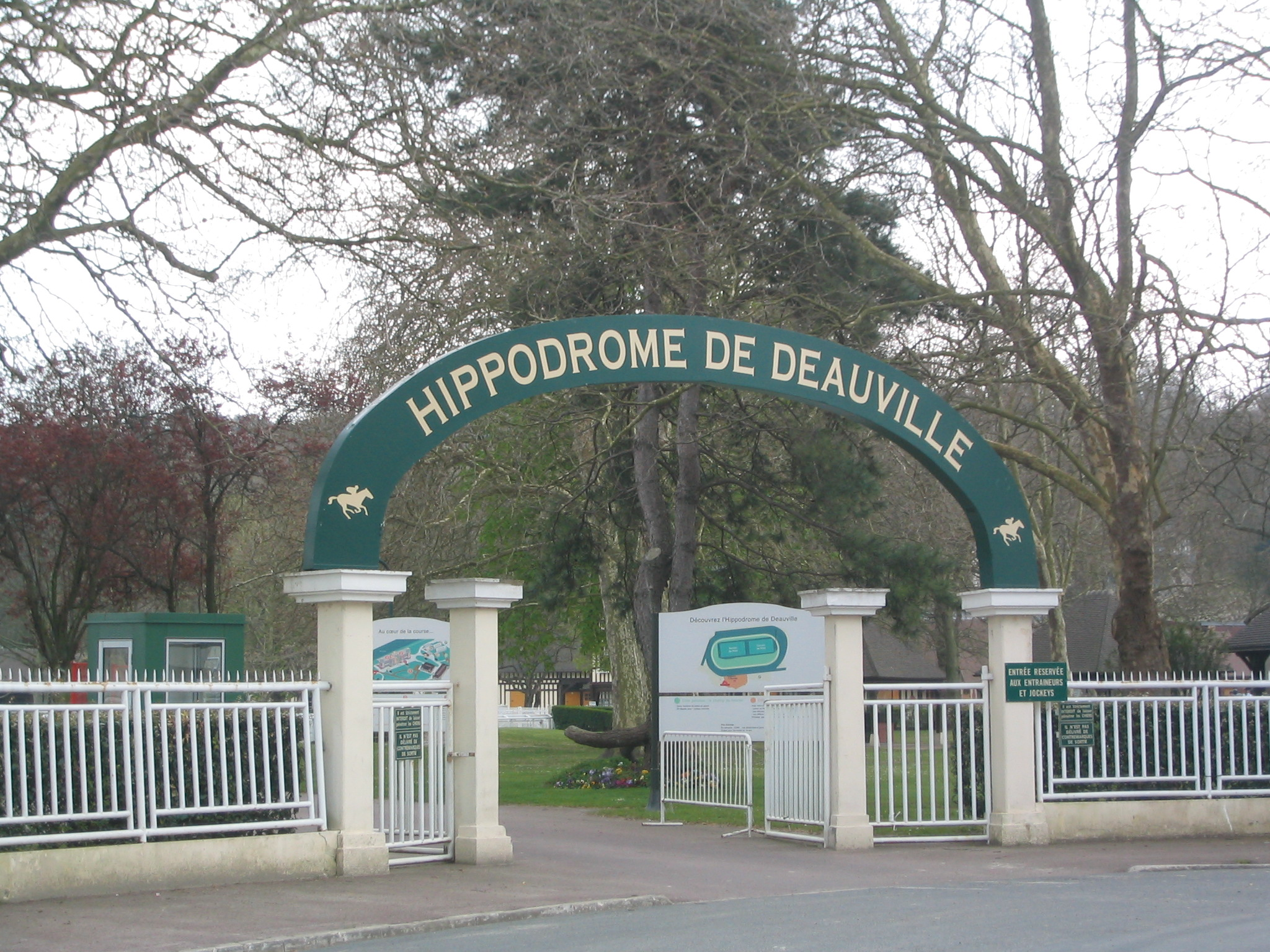
- Entrance of the Deauville-Clairefontaine Racecourse

- Coat of arms
- Location of Tourgéville
- Location within France Location within Normandy
- Coordinates: 49°19′29″N 0°03′54″E
- Country: France
- Region: Normandy
- Department: Calvados
- Arrondissement: Lisieux
- Canton: Pont-l'Évêque
- Intercommunality: CC Cœur Côte Fleurie

Government
  - Mayor (2020–2026): Michel Chevallier
- Area^{1}: 12.01 km^{2} (4.64 sq mi)
- Elevation: 15 m (49 ft)
- Highest elevation: 100 m (330 ft)
- Lowest elevation: 2 m (6.6 ft)
- Population (2023): 846
  - Density: 70.4/km^{2} (182/sq mi)
- Time zone: UTC+01:00 (CET)
  - Summer (DST): UTC+02:00 (CEST)
- INSEE/Postal code: 14701 /14800
- ^{1} French Land Register data, which excludes lakes, ponds, glaciers > 1 km^{2} (0.386 sq mi or 247 acres) and river estuaries.

Tourgéville (French pronunciation: [tuʁʒevil]) is a commune in the Calvados department in the Normandy region in northwestern France.

The Deauville-Clairefontaine Racecourse is located on the territory of the commune.

== Population ==
Historical population
Year	Pop.	±% p.a.
1968	718	—
1975	686	−0.65%
1982	748	+1.24%
1990	730	−0.30%
1999	848	+1.68%
2007	914	+0.94%
2012	943	+0.63%
2017	799	−3.26%
2023	846	+0.96%
Source: INSEE

== See also ==
- Côte Fleurie
- Communes of the Calvados department
- Tourgeville, diary of a small Normandy village - news clippings from the 19th and 20th century
