= Houlgate battery =

WW2 German fortification in Calvados, Normandy, France

- Part of Atlantic Wall
- Normandy, France

Location
- Coordinates: 49°18′17″N 0°04′04″W

Site history
- Built: 1941
- Built by: Organisation Todt
- In use: 1944
- Materials: Concrete and steel
- Battles/wars: Invasion of Normandy

Garrison information
- Past commanders: Major Fritz Günther
- Garrison: 1255 Heeres-Küsten-Artillerie-Abteilung (HKAA)

The Houlgate battery (also called the Battery de Tournebride) was a World War II German artillery battery constructed close to the French village of Houlgate in the Calvados department in the Lower Normandy region. Built into the top of a 300 ft (91 m) cliff, the bunker complex was created to protect the western bank of the mouth of the River Seine and was 10 mi (16 km) east of the Normandy landing beach Sword which it shelled. The former fire control post has been turned into an orientation table. The battery is 8 km west of the Mont Canisy battery.

== Construction ==
The Organisation Todt constructed concrete pits to protect six 155 mm K420 cannons in 1941. Each pit was linked via tunnels to ammunition stores and by telephone to a range-finding post. The Germans aimed to place all the First World War vintage French guns inside H679 casements but by the time of the Normandy landings only two had been completed.

== Garrison ==
The Houlgate battery was garrisoned by the 3 Company of the 1255 Heeres-Küsten-Artillerie-Abteilung (HKAA) and commanded by Major Fritz Günther.

== Operation Sunstar ==
The battery was the target of a raid by British commandos of No. 9 Commando in late November 1941. Their attempt to destroy the battery failed.

== D-Day and Normandy landings ==
Two weeks prior to D-Day, the battery was bombed by B-26 Marauders. Over 500 tons of bombs landed in the vicinity and two guns were made inoperable by the attack. On 5 June the RAF bombed the battery but caused minimal damage. On the morning of 6 June 1944, the battery shelled the Allied landing beach Sword. The officer commanding the Merville battery called in fire from Houlgate onto his own when it was being attacked by paratroopers.

At 0523 on 6 June 1944 the Royal Navy Roberts-class monitor, HMS Roberts engaged the battery from 20,000 yards with her 15 in (38 cm) guns but the 27 rounds fired caused minimal damage. In late June, the bunker was shelled by the 15 inch guns of HMS Erebus.

At the end of June 1944 the Germans evacuated the battery and moved the remaining guns inland for safety.

=== Operation Frog ===
The Houlgate battery was considered a serious threat to the landing beaches and it was initially considered as a target for No. 4 Commando. However, the need for commandos in the immediate vicinity of the landing beaches and the confidence of the RAF and Royal Navy to silence the battery saw this cancelled.
