= Hausen bei Würzburg =

- Municipality
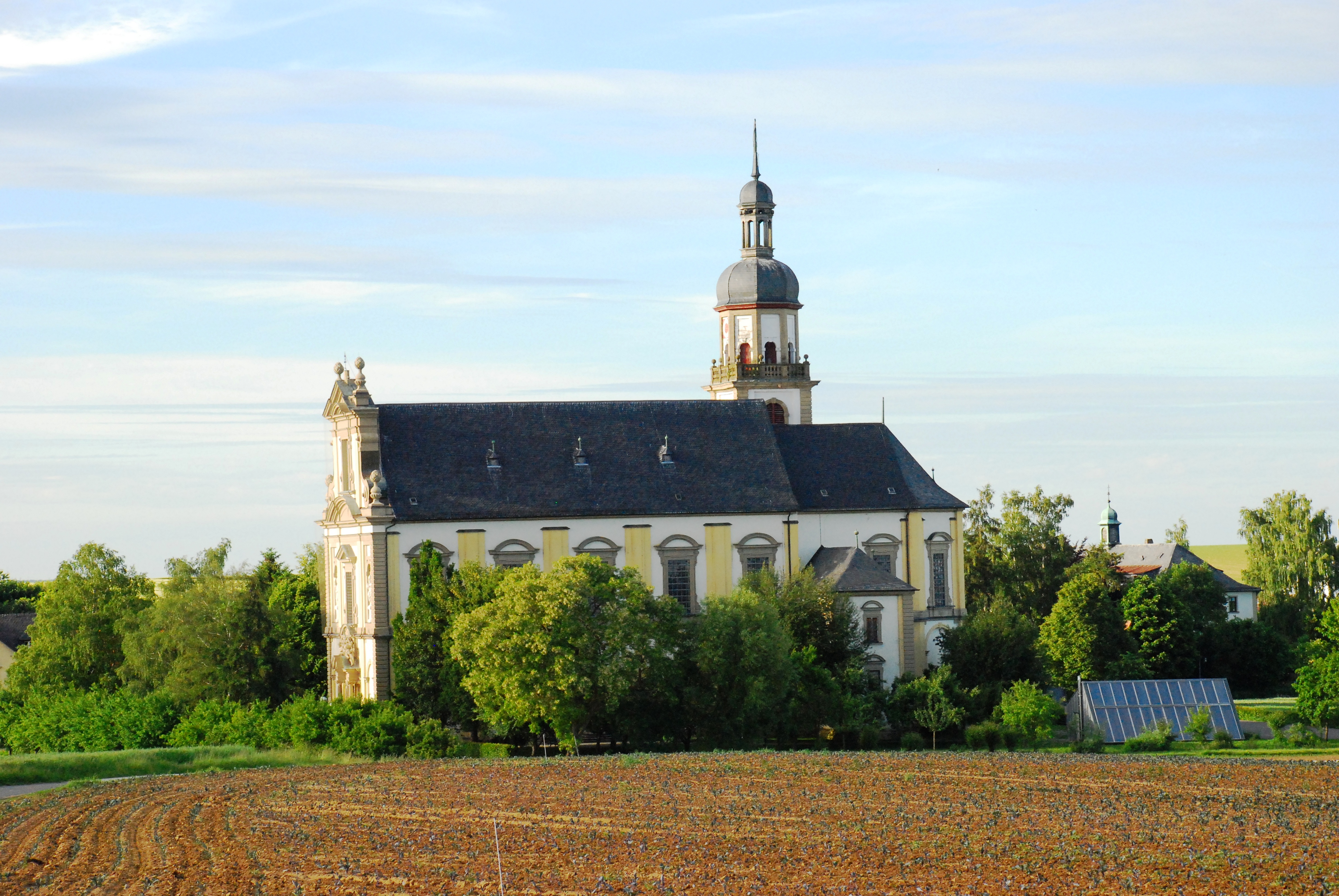
- Former Augustinian abbey in Fährbrück

- Coat of arms

- Location of Hausen bei Würzburg within Würzburg district
- Interactive map of Hausen bei Würzburg
- Location within Germany Location within Bavaria
- Coordinates: 49°56′N 10°1′E
- Country: Germany
- State: Bavaria
- Admin. region: Unterfranken
- District: Würzburg

Government
  - Mayor (2020–26): Bernd Schraud

Area
  - Total: 21.97 km^{2} (8.48 sq mi)
- Elevation: 272 m (892 ft)

Population (2025-12-31)
  - Total: 2,524
  - Density: 114.9/km^{2} (297.5/sq mi)
- Time zone: UTC+01:00 (CET)
  - Summer (DST): UTC+02:00 (CEST)
- Postal codes: 97262
- Dialling codes: 09367
- Vehicle registration: WÜ
- Website: www.hausen-wzbg.de

Hausen bei Würzburg is a municipality in the district of Würzburg in Bavaria in Germany. Hausen was founded in 1194. The municipality consists of three parts (populations as of July 2023):

- Erbshausen, population 906
- Hausen, population 854
- Rieden, population 769

== Twin towns ==
Hausen bei Würzburg is twinned with Villerville (France).
