= Jean Fassina =

French classical pianist (born 1936)

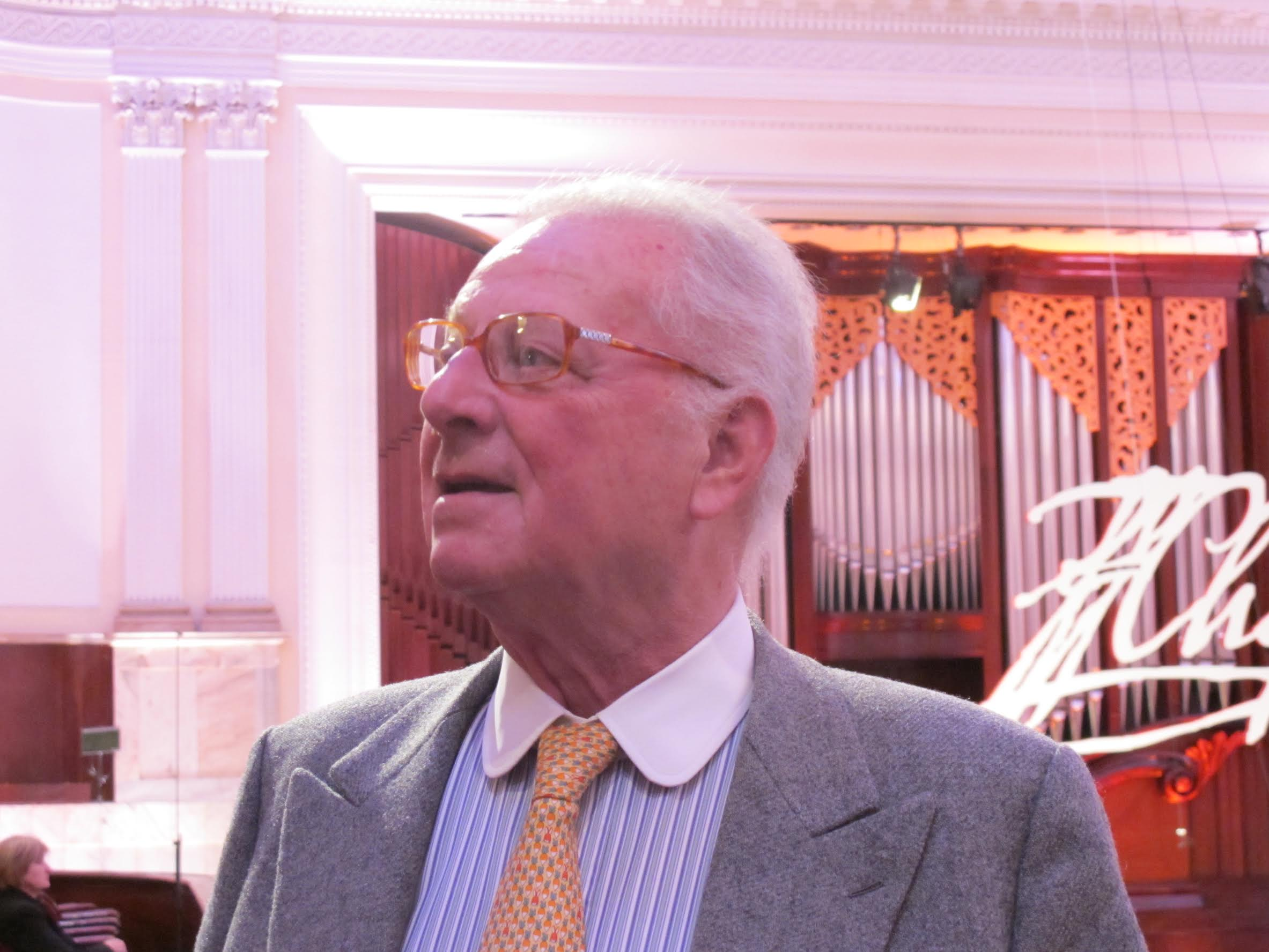
Fassina in October 2010, at the International Chopin Piano Competition

Jean Fassina (born 9 November 1936) is a French classical pianist born in Algiers.

A concert artist and direct heir to the Paderewski piano tradition, Fassina is a teacher who counts among his students a host of French and international artists.[livre 1]

== Biography ==
Fassina's grandmother was a pianist and composer, and his mother performed in concert and was his first teacher. He was trained at a very young age at the Conservatoire de Paris. (Note: Pages 15-16) After winning his prizes there, Fassina felt the desire to go and study in Eastern European countries, where the results of the teaching given there worked wonders in international competitions: "When not one but twenty pianists dazzle you, there is something obvious about it". (Note: Page 17)

Fassina obtained a scholarship that allowed him to study in Poland. He completed his training as a pianist in Kraków, the high place of the Polish piano school, under the benevolent guidance of Henryk Sztompka, himself a former student of Paderewski and worthy heir of an instrumental and stylistic tradition going back to Chopin and Liszt. (Note: Page 13)

In the first lesson, Sztompka told him "You are a musician, but you have to do everything over again...". Thus began four years of intensive work which Fassina himself describes as "the most extraordinary of his life". (Note: Page 19)

After a short and intense concert career from 1961 to 1975, he devoted himself to what he considered his true vocation: teaching the piano. In about ten years, he trained a good number of artists and teachers of all nationalities, to whom he passed on the knowledge he received in Poland.

After forty years of teaching, Jean Fassina published a book (Lettre à un jeune pianiste Fayard) in which he shares his pianistic knowledge and his pedagogical experience.

== Pedagogy ==
Fassina teaches in many countries in Europe and Asia:

- Conservatoire de Strasbourg
- Academies of Nice and Barèges (France)
- Académie de Haut Perfectionnement de Musique de Saluzzo (Italy)
- Conservatories of Sapporo, Osaka, Hiroshima, Okinawa (Japan)
- Central Conservatory of Music (China)
- Rencontres internationales d’Enghien,

=== Pupils ===
More than a hundred internationally known musicians have been students of Fassina such as:

- Jacques Rouvier
- Michel Béroff
- Olivier Gardon
- Jean-Rodolphe Kars
- Jacqueline Bourges-Mounoury
- Jean-Louis Haguenauer
- Beate Perrey

=== Master classes ===
Fassina is the permanent guest of prestigious master classes:

- Institut Chopin de Varsovie,
- Rencontre internationale de musique d'Enghien,
- Institut supérieur de musique et de pédagogie as well as the Higher Conservatories and Universities of Porto, Brussels, Bucharest, Beijing, Tokyo, Osaka.

=== Jury of international competitions ===
He also sits on the jury of numerous international competitions:

- Concours international P.T.N.A (Japan 2003)
- Concours international Frédéric Chopin de Moscou (Russia 2004)
- Concours international de Musique de Porto (Portugal 2002 and 2004)
- Concours international de Musique du Maroc (March 2013)
- Piano Campus International Competition (Pontoise, France, 2002, 2005, 2008, 2011)

== Sources ==
- Lettre à un jeune pianiste - Jean Fassina - Foreword by Jacques Rouvier - Éditions Fayard - III 2000

== Bibliography ==
- Lettre à un jeune pianiste - Jean Fassina - Foreword by Jacques Rouvier - Éditions Fayard - III 2000 ISBN 2-213-60592-0
