= Francis Bayer =

French composer and musicologist

Francis Bayer (c. 11 July 1938 – 2 January 2004) was a French composer and musicologist.

== Life ==
Born in Villerville (Calvados), it was only after having undertaken postgraduate studies in philosophy at the University of Paris, studies that led him to a doctorate, that Bayer decided to devote himself to musical composition. He was then a student of Henri Dutilleux at the École Normale de Musique de Paris and obtained a degree in composition in his class in 1970.

Among his main works are Perspectives for solo cello (1991), the Prélude à la nuit for orchestra (1992–96), as well as the Propositions series, a cycle of eight pieces for different audiences, each composed between 1972 and 1989, each illustrating in its own way what can be called a "poetic timbre".

In addition to his activity as a composer, Bayer has been teaching aesthetics and musical analysis as well as instrumentation and orchestration since 1971 in the Music Department of the Paris 8 University where he had as students future composers as different in their aesthetic orientations as Bernard Cavanna, Pascal Dusapin, Jean-Louis Florentz, Régis Renouard-Larivière, Bernard de Vienne and Patrick Andrey, for example.

He is also the author of several studies published in various journals and of an important theoretical book entitled: De Schönberg à Cage, published in Paris by Klincksieck Editions and, in collaboration with Nicolas Zourabichvili, of a translation and critical edition of the Correspondance de Moussorgski (Fayard).

Bayer died from cancer in Paris at age 65.

== Discography ==
- Propositions I à VIII, ensembles vocal et instrumentaux, Les Percussions de Strasbourg, dir. Jean-Louis Forestier, Erato Records, 1990
- Cinq Essais, with Jean-Louis Haguenauer, piano, Renaud François, flute; Alain Meunier, cello; Épisode, Ensemble Tétra, with Madalena Soveral, piano; Christian Hamouy and Georges Van Gucht, percussions, Perspectives, Alain Meunier, cello; éditions Pierre Vérany, 1996.
