= Villerville =

- Commune
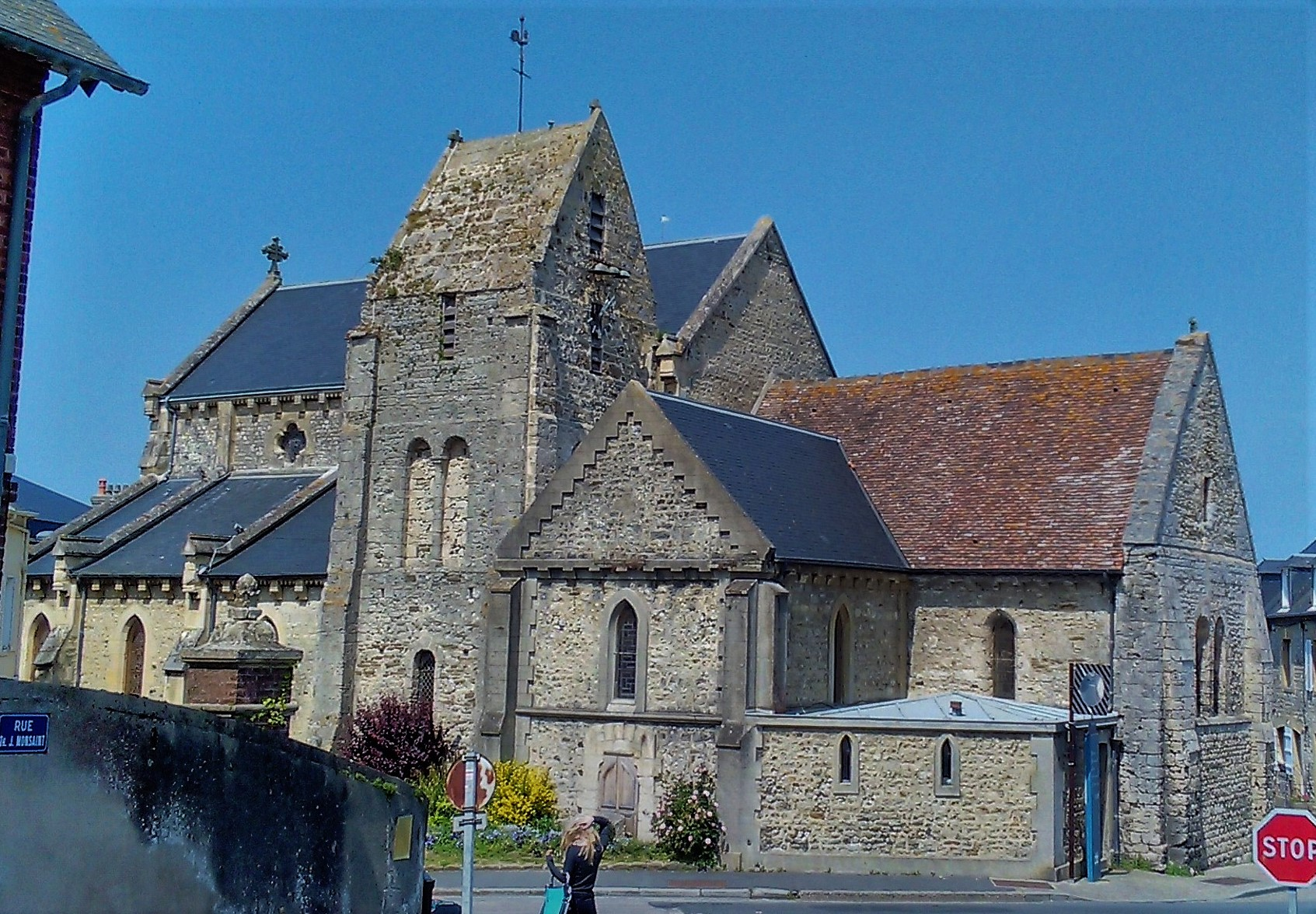
- The church in Villerville

- Coat of arms
- Location of Villerville
- Location within France Location within Normandy
- Coordinates: 49°24′06″N 0°07′46″E
- Country: France
- Region: Normandy
- Department: Calvados
- Arrondissement: Lisieux
- Canton: Honfleur-Deauville
- Intercommunality: CC Cœur Côte Fleurie

Government
  - Mayor (2020–2026): Michel Marescot
- Area^{1}: 3.30 km^{2} (1.27 sq mi)
- Elevation: 60 m (200 ft)
- Highest elevation: 144 m (472 ft)
- Lowest elevation: 0 m (0 ft)
- Population (2023): 620
  - Density: 190/km^{2} (490/sq mi)
- Time zone: UTC+01:00 (CET)
  - Summer (DST): UTC+02:00 (CEST)
- INSEE/Postal code: 14755 /14113
- ^{1} French Land Register data, which excludes lakes, ponds, glaciers > 1 km^{2} (0.386 sq mi or 247 acres) and river estuaries.

Villerville (French pronunciation: [vilɛʁvil]) is a commune in the Calvados department in the Normandy region in northwestern France. The commune is located towards the eastern end of the 40 km (25 mi) coastline called the Côte Fleurie (Flowery Coast).

== In entertainment ==
In the summer of 1923 the American art collector and patron Peggy Guggenheim rented a villa in the village and entertained, amongst others, the American photographer Man Ray and his partner, the French model, singer, artist and 'Queen of Montparnasse' Alice Prin, also known as 'Kiki'. According the recently published biography of Kiki, Peggy would encourage her guests to paint in the villa's garden, and Peggy "picked up a brush for the first and last time of her life."

Composer Francis Bayer (1938–2004) was born in Villerville.

The film A Monkey in Winter Un singe en hiver, starring Jean Gabin and Jean-Paul Belmondo, was shot there in 1962. Villerville celebrated the film's 50th anniversary with special events from 30 June to 20 October 2012.

La Baleine Theatre (The Whale Theater) operated between July and November 1894. The brainchild of Simon-Max, who managed Villerville's Casino for a time, he purchased the remains of a beached whale at auction and had it converted into a theater seating 80–100, where he himself performed in various revues.

The attraction was so successful it was moved first to Trouville, then to the Casino de Paris, where it served the dual function of a museum and theater. It was destroyed by fire on the night of February 25–26, 1895, causing the Casino substantial damage.

The "Friends of the Villerville Whale" was founded in 2013 with the aim of reviving the town's casino. In July 2014 they commemorated the 120th anniversary of The Whale Theater.

== Population ==
Historical population
Year	Pop.	±% p.a.
1968	728	—
1975	722	−0.12%
1982	733	+0.22%
1990	686	−0.82%
1999	676	−0.16%
2007	761	+1.49%
2012	720	−1.10%
2017	627	−2.73%
2023	620	−0.19%
Source: INSEE

== International relations ==
Villerville is twinned with:

- Hausen bei Würzburg (in Bavaria, Germany)

== See also ==
- Communes of the Calvados department
