= Communauté de communes Cœur Côte Fleurie =

Intercommunal structure in Normandy, France

Cœur Côte Fleurie
- Communauté de communes
- Interactive map of Cœur Côte Fleurie
- Coordinates: 49°21′N 00°04′E
- Country: France
- Region: Normandy
- Department: Calvados
- No. of communes: {{{nbcomm}}}
- Established: 1974

Government
  - President: Philippe Augier
- Area: 118.2 km^{2} (45.6 sq mi)
- Population (2021): 20,632
  - Density: 174.6/km^{2} (452.1/sq mi)
- Website: www.coeurcotefleurie.org

Communauté de Communes Cœur Côte Fleurie is the intercommunal structure centered on the town of Deauville. It is located in the Calvados department in Normandy, northwestern France. It was created in 1974 as the district of Trouville-Deauville, which was converted into a communauté de communes in 2002, and its seat is in Deauville. Its area is 118.2 square kilometers. As of 2021, its population was 20,632 people, with 3,565 people living in Deauville proper.

== Composition ==
Communauté de communes Cœur Côte Fleurie is made up of the following 12 communes:

1. Benerville-sur-Mer
2. Blonville-sur-Mer
3. Deauville
4. Saint-Arnoult
5. Saint-Gatien-des-Bois
6. Saint-Pierre-Azif
7. Touques
8. Tourgéville
9. Trouville-sur-Mer
10. Vauville
11. Villers-sur-Mer
12. Villerville
