= Saint-Arnoult, Calvados =

Saint-Arnoult
- Commune
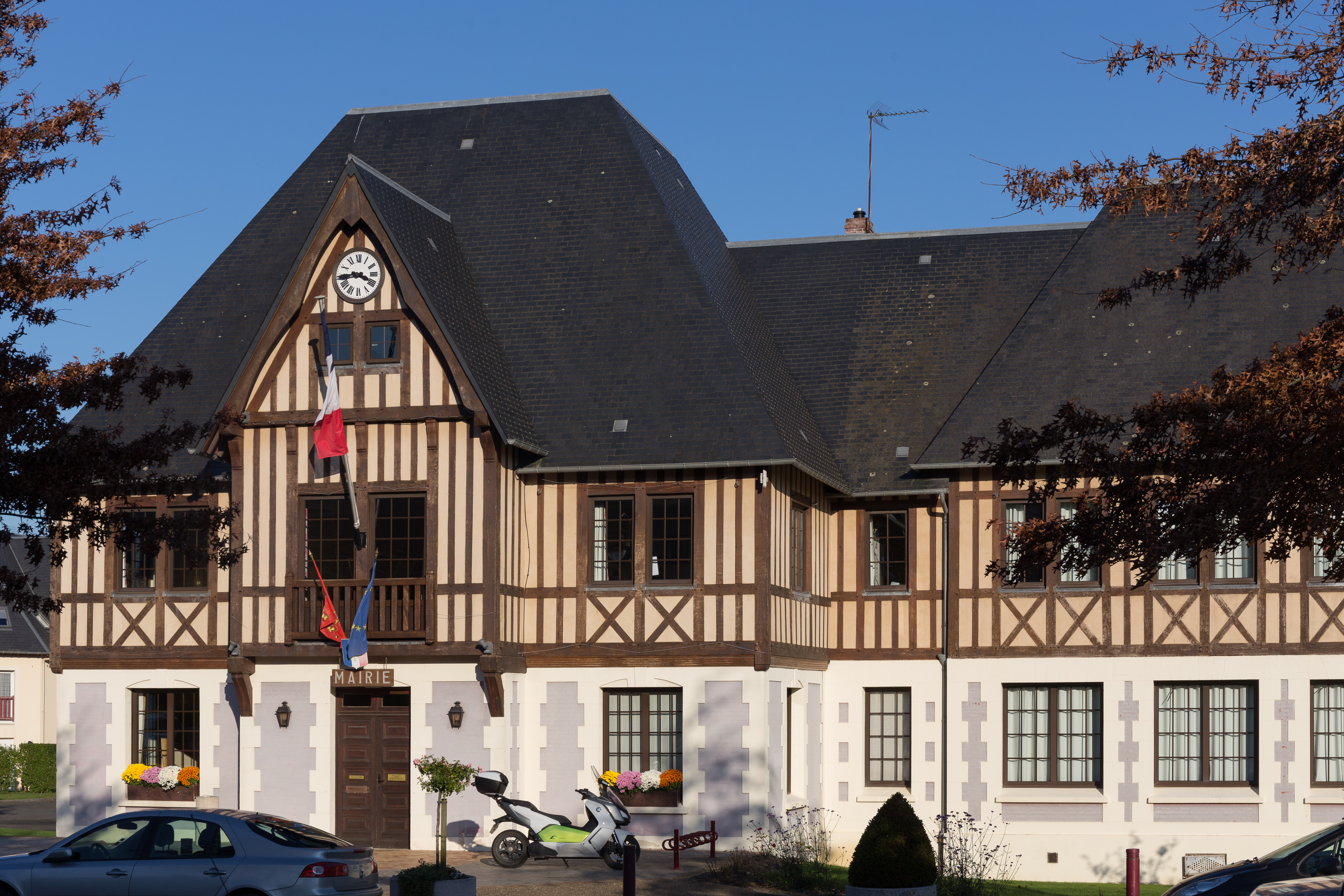
- The town hall in Saint-Arnoult

- Coat of arms
- Location of Saint-Arnoult
- Location within France Location within Normandy
- Coordinates: 49°20′03″N 0°05′25″E
- Country: France
- Region: Normandy
- Department: Calvados
- Arrondissement: Lisieux
- Canton: Pont-l'Évêque
- Intercommunality: CC Cœur Côte Fleurie

Government
  - Mayor (2020–2026): François Pédrono
- Area^{1}: 5.12 km^{2} (1.98 sq mi)
- Elevation: 30 m (98 ft)
- Highest elevation: 100 m (330 ft)
- Lowest elevation: 2 m (6.6 ft)
- Population (2023): 1,092
  - Density: 213/km^{2} (552/sq mi)
- Time zone: UTC+01:00 (CET)
  - Summer (DST): UTC+02:00 (CEST)
- INSEE/Postal code: 14557 /14800
- ^{1} French Land Register data, which excludes lakes, ponds, glaciers > 1 km^{2} (0.386 sq mi or 247 acres) and river estuaries.

Saint-Arnoult (French pronunciation: [sɛ̃.t‿aʁnu]) is a commune in the Calvados department, region of Normandy, northwestern France.

== Population ==
Historical population
Year	Pop.	±% p.a.
1968	523	—
1975	526	+0.08%
1982	518	−0.22%
1990	766	+5.01%
1999	903	+1.85%
2007	1,004	+1.33%
2012	1,185	+3.37%
2017	1,165	−0.34%
2023	1,092	−1.07%
Source: INSEE

== See also ==
- Communes of the Calvados department
