= Sallenelles =

- Commune
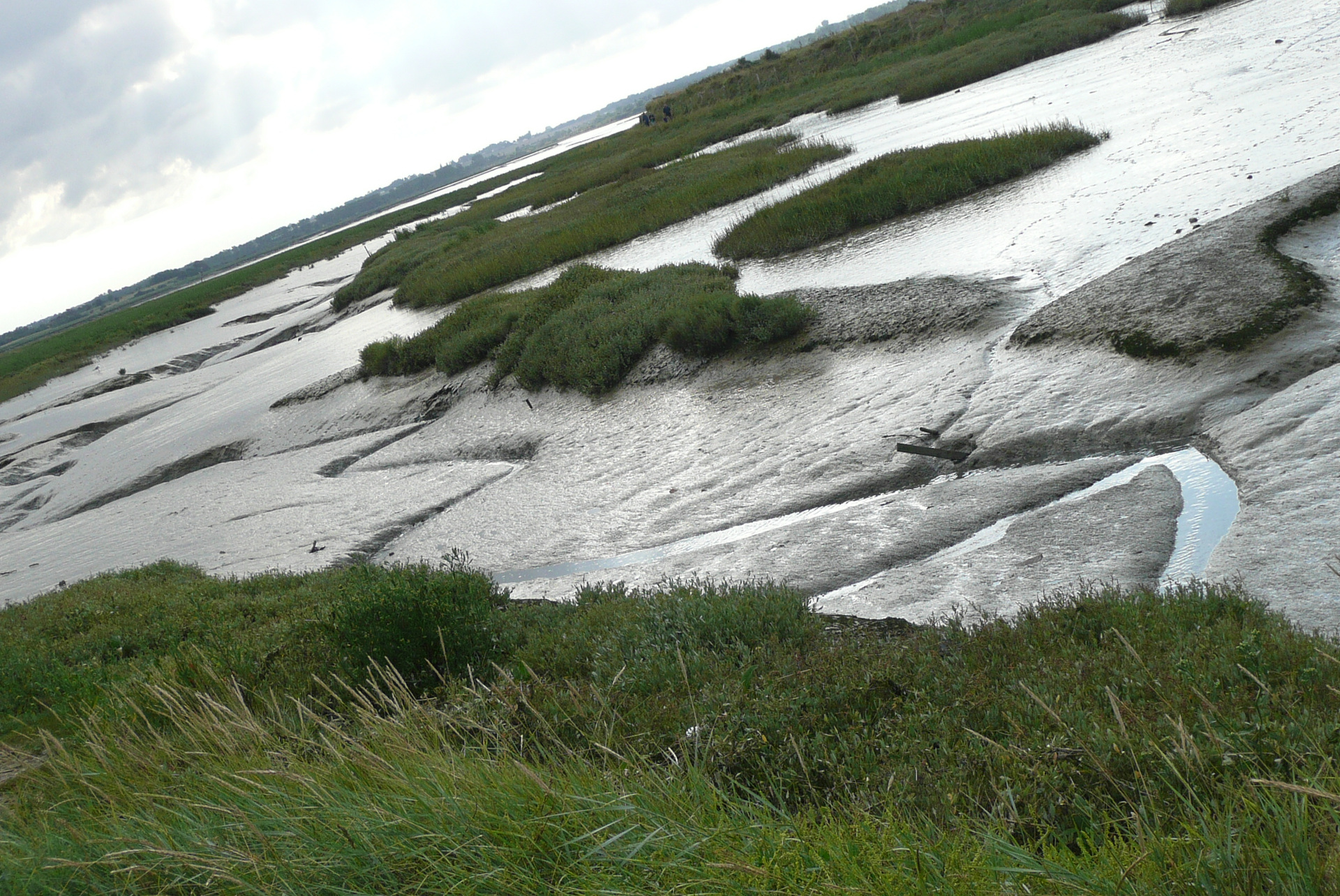
- Orne estuary

- Coat of arms
- Location of Sallenelles
- Location within France Location within Normandy
- Coordinates: 49°15′50″N 0°13′41″W
- Country: France
- Region: Normandy
- Department: Calvados
- Arrondissement: Lisieux
- Canton: Cabourg
- Intercommunality: CC Normandie-Cabourg-Pays d'Auge

Government
  - Mayor (2020–2026): Laurent Lemarchand
- Area^{1}: 1.25 km^{2} (0.48 sq mi)
- Elevation: 5 m (16 ft)
- Highest elevation: 40 m (130 ft)
- Lowest elevation: 0 m (0 ft)
- Population (2023): 287
  - Density: 230/km^{2} (595/sq mi)
- Time zone: UTC+01:00 (CET)
  - Summer (DST): UTC+02:00 (CEST)
- INSEE/Postal code: 14665 /14121
- ^{1} French Land Register data, which excludes lakes, ponds, glaciers > 1 km^{2} (0.386 sq mi or 247 acres) and river estuaries.

Sallenelles (French pronunciation: [salnɛl]) is a commune in the Calvados department in the Normandy region in northwestern France.

== Population ==
Historical population
Year	Pop.	±% p.a.
1968	306	—
1975	314	+0.37%
1982	290	−1.13%
1990	240	−2.34%
1999	293	+2.24%
2007	277	−0.70%
2012	309	+2.21%
2017	294	−0.99%
2023	287	−0.40%
Source: INSEE

== Tourism ==
Most visitors to Sallenelles come to see the Orne estuary, to walk, cycle, or hunt the local water-fowl, or the Maison de la Nature, a permanent exhibition on the local ecosystem. World War II veterans come to see the memorial to the Belgian Brigade Piron which liberated the village in 1944.

=== Transportation ===
Sallenelles is on the D514 between Ranville and Merville-Franceville-Plage. There is also a road to Amfreville. The Bus Verts line 20 has some services that stop at Sallenelles.

== See also ==
- Communes of the Calvados department
