= Blonville-sur-Mer =

- Commune
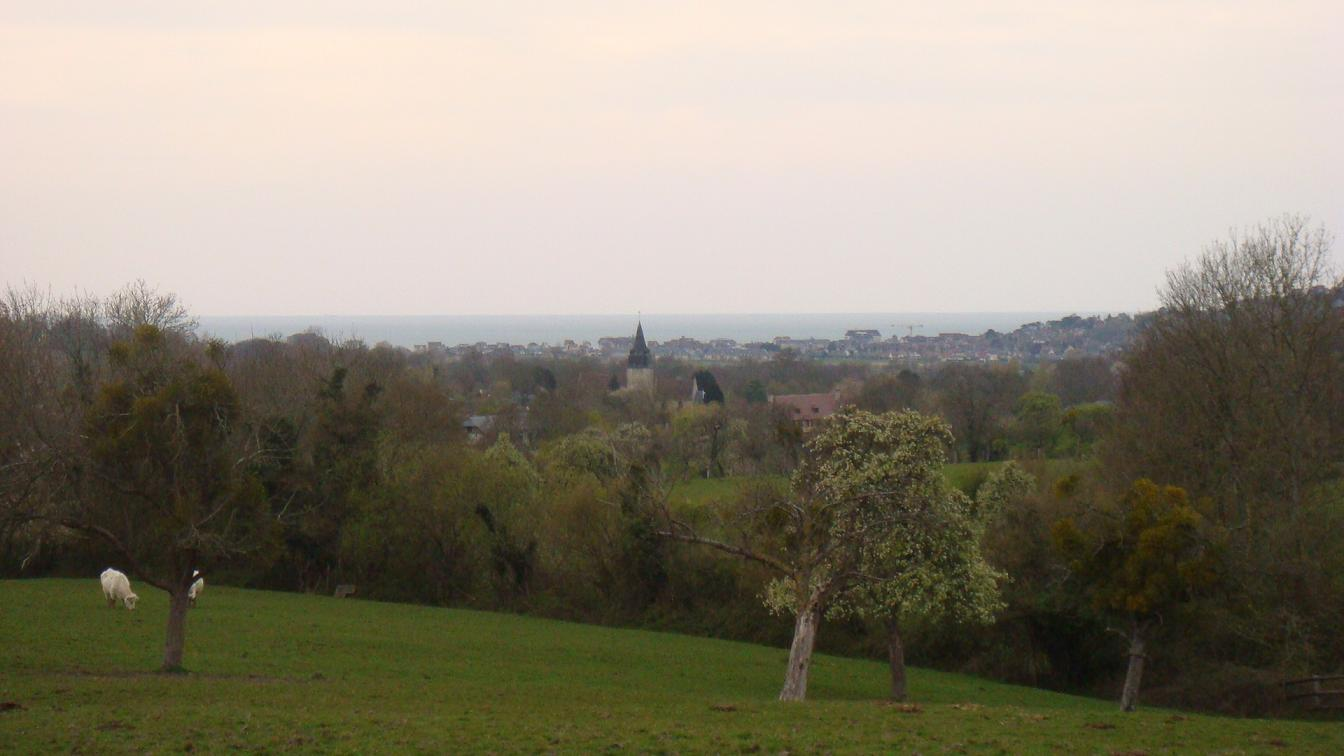
- Countryside and beach

- Coat of arms
- Location of Blonville-sur-Mer
- Location within France Location within Normandy
- Coordinates: 49°20′21″N 0°01′53″E
- Country: France
- Region: Normandy
- Department: Calvados
- Arrondissement: Lisieux
- Canton: Pont-l'Évêque
- Intercommunality: CC Cœur Côte Fleurie

Government
  - Mayor (2020–2026): Yves Lemonnier
- Area^{1}: 6.8 km^{2} (2.6 sq mi)
- Elevation: 101 m (331 ft)
- Highest elevation: 112 m (367 ft)
- Lowest elevation: 2 m (6.6 ft)
- Population (2023): 1,621
  - Density: 240/km^{2} (620/sq mi)
- Time zone: UTC+01:00 (CET)
  - Summer (DST): UTC+02:00 (CEST)
- INSEE/Postal code: 14079 /14910
- ^{1} French Land Register data, which excludes lakes, ponds, glaciers > 1 km^{2} (0.386 sq mi or 247 acres) and river estuaries.

Blonville-sur-Mer (French pronunciation: [blɔ̃vil syʁ mɛʁ], literally Blonville on Sea) is a commune in the Calvados department in the Normandy region in northwestern France. It is a seaside resort on the Côte Fleurie with a long sandy beach.

== Transport ==
Blonville-sur-Mer is on the railway line from Deauville to Dives-sur-Mer. The station building (Blonville-Bénerville) is no longer open but train services operate year-round at weekends as well as on week days during the summer season.

== Population ==
Historical population
Year	Pop.	±% p.a.
1968	727	—
1975	758	+0.60%
1982	889	+2.30%
1990	1,062	+2.25%
1999	1,341	+2.63%
2007	1,576	+2.04%
2012	1,567	−0.11%
2017	1,545	−0.28%
2023	1,621	+0.80%
Source: INSEE

== Notable people linked to the commune ==
=== Deaths ===
- Jean Baud (1919-2012), founder of Leader Price.

=== Others ===
- Robert Gangnat, representative of the society of dramatic authors. It was at his home that the publisher Gaston Gallimard first met Marcel Proust, in August 1908.
- Vincent Bolloré, French businessman, bought a villa by the sea in 2008.
- The writer and member of the French Resistance René Hardy (1911-1987) lived here from 1974 to 1982 in a villa rented to a professor of medicine.

== See also ==
- Communes of the Calvados department
