= Olivier Gardon =

French classical pianist

Olivier Gardon is a French classical pianist and piano teacher born on 29 January 1950 in Nice, France.

== Early life ==
The seven year old prodigy had come to the attention of the Hungarian pianist Lili Kraus, who had strongly encouraged him to pursue a career in music. When he first performed with an orchestra at the Opéra de Nice playing Bach's piano Concerto in D Minor, he was only ten years old.

He was trained by Madam Audibert-Lambert, a student of Alfred Cortot, and went on to study at the Conservatoire de Nice and at the Conservatoire de Paris with Pierre Sacan, a student of Yves Nat. He perfected his skills under the advisory of Jean Hubeau, Jean Fassina, Géza Anda, Lili Kraus, and György Sebök.

== Career ==
He has been honored numerous awards in prestigious international competitions, including the Long-Thibaud-Crespin Competition (1973), the Queen Elisabeth Music Competition (1975), the Viotti International Music Competition, the Rina Sala Gallo International Piano Competition, the Senigallia Competition and the Alfredo Casella Piano Competition in Naples.

After that, he started his career as a soloist and as a chamber music player. He performed in the biggest venues of the world's musical capitals such as the Théâtre des Champs-Élysées, the Salle Pleyel, and the Théâtre du Châtelet in Paris, the Royal Festival Hall and the Barbican Center in London, the Carnegie Hall in New York, the Großes Festspielhaus in Salzbourg, the Tokyo Bunka Kaikan Hall in Tokyo, the Dvorak Hall in Prague, etc.

For his debut at Carnegie Hall in New York, the New York Times critic praised his "full-bodied, clear, clean and refreshingly unsentimental" playing.

== Discography (selected) ==
- l'Œuvre pour piano de Louis Vierne (Timpani 2C2023)
- Franz Liszt: Fantasie et Fugue sur le nom de BACH, etc. (BNL 112748)
- Mussorgsky: Tableau d'une exposition, etc. (BNL 112789)
- Ludwig van Beethoven: Les 3 dernières sonates, (BNL 112911)
- Alkan: La Musique de chamber, Olivier Gardon, Dong-Suk Kang, Yvan Chiffoleau (Timpani 1C1013)
- Brahms' Sonata in F minor and Variations and Fugue on a Theme by Handel (5 Diapasons)
