= Jean-Rodolphe Kars =

French pianist

Jean-Rodolphe Kars (born 1947) is an Indian-born French pianist of Austrian Jewish origin, who became a Catholic priest of the Catholic Emmanuel Community.

== Biography ==
The parents of Jean-Rodolphe Kars were both Viennese Jews who had fled Austria after the Anschluss in 1938. They met in Calcutta, India, where Gustav Kars (himself born in 1913 in Shanghai) met Mila, a qualified doctor (who had volunteered to work in a Red Cross hospital after being widowed in New Zealand). Jean-Rodolphe – Gustav's first child and Mila's second – was born in 1947.

Deciding that Europe would offer their children the possibility of a superior education, the Kars family left India for France. They lived for some years in a small town in the Haute Loire, but eventually settled in Paris where Gustav found employment in a private Jewish school. The family's circumstances were quite modest, but Jean-Rodolphe's musical ability was obvious; he gained entrance to the Paris Conservatoire, where he studied from 1958–64. He also studied with Julius Katchen. From 1974, Jean-Rodolphe Kars studied with the French pianist and pedagogue Jean Fassina, the most important and inspiring teaching, according to Kars, in his musical formation.

At the age of 19, Jean-Rodolphe Kars took part in the second Leeds Piano Competition (1966). In somewhat controversial circumstances, Kars received the fourth prize, with the first prize going to the Spaniard Rafael Orozco, the second being awarded jointly to the Russians Viktoria Postnikova and Semion Kruchin, and the third to the Russian Aleksey Nasedkin.

Kars' London debut was in 1967; in 1968 he was awarded first prize in the Olivier Messiaen piano competition.

During this time the Kars family lived in a working-class area of Paris called quartier Alésia, in an apartment so cramped that the piano and a tiny bath installation (isolated by a curtain) had to be kept in the same room. In 1971, he partook in a well received tour of Southern Africa.

Kars' upbringing had been that of a secular Jew; in 1976, however, he converted to Catholicism and was baptised at Sacré-Cœur, Paris, in 1977. In 1980, he joined a Catholic association of the faithful (the Emmanuel Community). In 1981, he ended his official career as concert pianist. In 1986 he entered the priesthood, becoming Père Jean-Rodolphe Kars. Since 1986, he has been Chaplain of Paray-le-Monial, a town in the Burgundy region of France.

Although he possessed a varied and eclectic repertoire, ranging from Bach to Schoenberg, Kars then specialized in the works of Olivier Messiaen. Later, as a priest, he also lectured and wrote articles on the spiritual and theological aspects of the music of the great French composer. Having begun to study Messiaen's music and writings as long ago as 1966, Kars credits him with playing an important role in his eventual conversion to Catholicism and his vocation as a priest, and considers him his 'first spiritual father'.

== Recordings ==
Debussy: Fantasie for Piano and Orchestra
Jean-Rodolphe Kars (Piano); Sir Alexander Gibson; London Symphony Orchestra (DECCA)

Debussy: Preludes for Piano, Book 1; Book 2
Jean-Rodolphe Kars (Piano) (DECCA)

Delius: Concerto for Piano in C minor
Jean-Rodolphe Kars (Piano); Sir Alexander Gibson; London Symphony Orchestra (DECCA)

Schoenberg: Three Piano pieces Op 11; Six Little Piano Pieces Op 19; Five Piano pieces Op 23; Suite for Piano Op 25; Piano Pieces Op 33a and b
Jean-Rodolphe Kars (Piano) (EMI France, C 065 12870; 1975)

Messiaen: "Vingt Regards sur l'Enfant Jésus". Jean-Rodolphe Kars (piano) (Piano classics, 2017) Recording of a concert given by Jean-Rodolphe Kars in 1976 in Amsterdam.

== Writings ==
- Père Jean-Rodolphe Kars: 'Hommage a Olivier Messiaen', in Olivier Messiaen, homme de foi, regard sur son œuvre d’orgue (Trinité Média Communication, 1995).
- Père Jean-Rodolphe Kars: 'Das Werk Olivier Messiaens und die katholische Liturgie', in Olivier Messiaen. La Cite celeste – das himmlische Jerusalem. Über das Leben und Werk des französischen Komponisten (Köln Wienand Verlag, 1998).
- Père Jean-Rodolphe Kars: 'The Spirituality of Messiaen's Organ Works', Organists Review, November 2008.
