= Deauville-Clairefontaine Racecourse =

Horse race track in France

Coordinates: 49°20′46″N 0°3′25″E

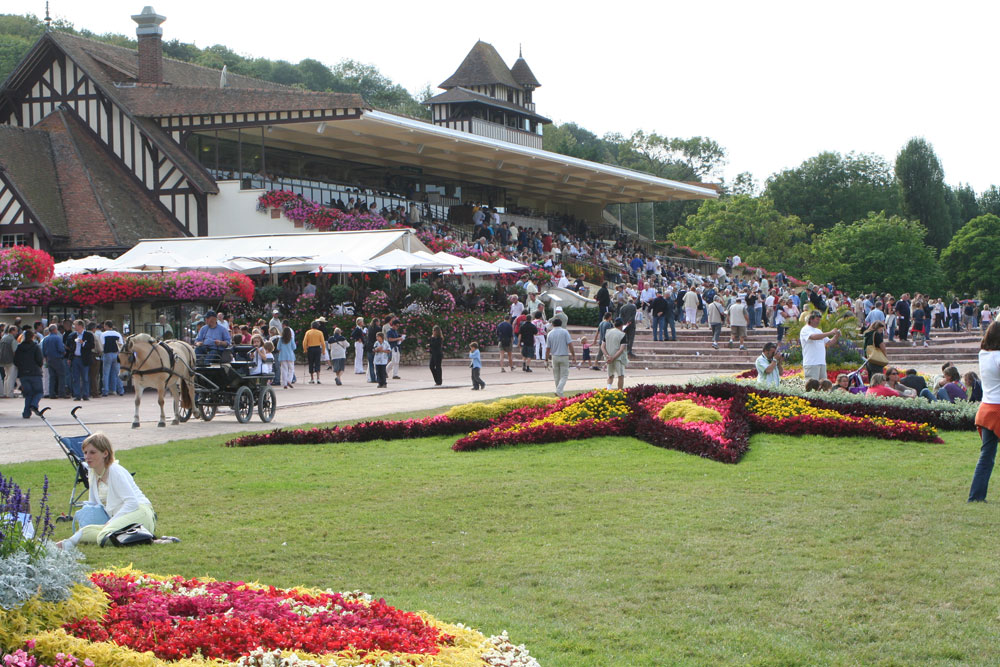
Deauville - Clairefontaine racecourse

Deauville-Clairefontaine Racecourse is a horse race track located in Tourgéville near Deauville in the Calvados département in the Normandy région of France. The 40-acre (16 ha) facility hosts harness racing, thoroughbred flat racing, steeplechase and hurdle races.

The countryside around Deauville is the main horse breeding region in France and home to numerous stud farms.

== See also ==
- Deauville-La Touques Racecourse
