= Jean-Louis Haguenauer =

French pianist (born 1954)

Jean-Louis Haguenauer (born 1954) is a French classical pianist.

== Biography ==
Born in Paris, Haguenauer has taken courses in music analysis, writing and music composition with Nadia Boulanger and Henri Dutilleux. He worked with Louis Hiltbrand, Germaine Mounier, Alfred Loewenguth and Jean Fassina.

In chamber formation, Haguenauer works notably with Jeff Cohen, Alexis Galpérine, Annick Roussin, Jaime Laredo, Pierre-Henri Xuereb, Atar Arad, Arnaud Thorette, Cécilia Tsan, Sharon Robinson, Tsuyoshi Tsutsumi, Patrick Gallois, Thomas Robertello, András Adorján Michel Lethiec, James Campbell, the Ebène Quartet, the Fine Arts Quartet, the Stanislas Ensemble, Les Percussions de Strasbourg and the "Accroche-Notes" ensemble. From 1991 to 1997, he was a member of the Florence Gould Hall Chamber Players, and from 2003 to 2007, of the American Chamber Players.

Haguenauer has been invited to the Festival de La Roque-d'Anthéron, La Folle Journée of Nantes, the Radio France-Montpellier festival, the Church of the Jacobins in Toulouse, the Orangerie de Sceaux, the Vichy opera, the Library of Congress, and the Kreeger Museum festivals.

For the past twenty years, Haguenauer has formed a duo with tenor Gilles Ragon, with whom he has deepened the repertoire of French mélodies and lieder.

From 1988 to 1998, Haguenauer taught the piano at the Conservatoire de Strasbourg.

In 2012, he finished the first complete recording of Claude Debussy's melodies, made in Brive-la-Gaillarde, on the composer's piano kept at the Brive Museum.

Haguenauer currently lives in the United States, and teaches at the Indiana University Bloomington.

== Discography ==
- Ernest Bloch's works for viola, with Pierre-Henry Xuereb, Andras Adorjan; éditions Adda, 1989
- Carl Maria von Weber's Chamber music: Piano quartet, Flute trio, Variations for violin and piano; Alexis Galperine, Pierre-Henry Xuereb, Cecilia Tsan, Jean-Christophe Falala; éditions Timpani, 1991
- Transcriptions of Beethoven's symphonies n°1 et 2 by Franz Liszt, éditions Harmonia Mundi, 1995;
- Francis Bayer's Cinq Essais, with Renaud François, flute; Alain Meunier, cello; Épisode, Tétra Ensemble, with Madalena Soveral, piano; Christian Hamouy and Georges Van Gucht, percussions, éditions Pierre Vérany, 1996;
- Claude Debussy's Préludes, éditions Ligia Digital, 1998
- Claude Debussy's Piano music, éditions Meridian Records, 1999
- Guy Ropartz's Trio in A minor for violin, cello and piano, with Alexis Gasparine, violin; Cecilia Tsan, cello, éditions Timpani, 1999
- Guy Ropartz's 1st and 2nd sonatas for violin and piano, with Alexis Galpérine, éditions La Guilde des musiciens, 2003
- Beethoven's An die ferne Geliebte and Robert Schumann, Fantasie op.17 Dichterliebe, with Gilles Ragon, tenor; éditions Saphir Productions
- Igor Stravinsky's Histoire du soldat and other pieces, with Michel Lethiec, Patrick Gallois, Annick Roussin, Alexis Galperine, Pierre-Henry Xuereb, Philippe Muller, Francis Pierre; éditions Saphir Productions, 2010
- Hector Berlioz's Mélodies and duos, with Gilles Ragon, Didier Henry, éditions Maguelone, 2013
- Johann Strauss' Four Waltz, Transcription by Schoenberg, Berg and Webern, Stanislas ensemble, éditions Gallo
- Claude Debussy's complete melodies

== Prizes and awards ==
- Licence de concerts à l'unanimité à l'École Normale de Musique de Paris, 1973
- First prize for virtuosity unanimously, with congratulations from the jury, at the Conservatoire de Musique de Genève (Louis Hiltbrand's class), 1977
- Counterpoint and Fugue Prize at the Geneva Conservatory
- Lili Boulanger Composition prize
- Laureate of the Yehudi Menuhin Foundation, 1983
