= Vauville, Calvados =

Vauville
- Commune
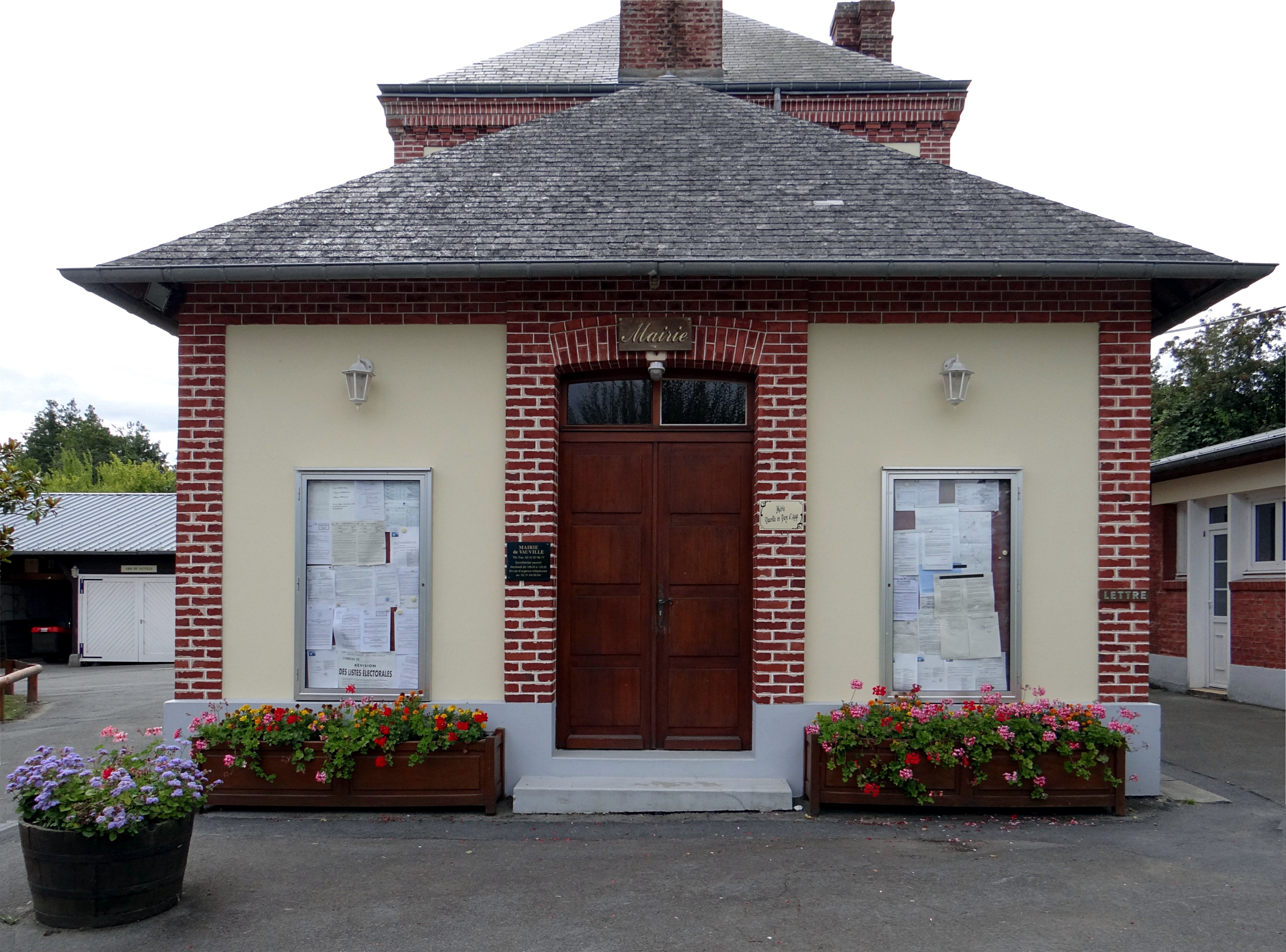
- The town hall in Vauville
- Location of Vauville
- Location within France Location within Normandy
- Coordinates: 49°18′46″N 0°03′13″E
- Country: France
- Region: Normandy
- Department: Calvados
- Arrondissement: Lisieux
- Canton: Pont-l'Évêque
- Intercommunality: CC Cœur Côte Fleurie

Government
  - Mayor (2020–2026): Régine Curzydlo
- Area^{1}: 5.13 km^{2} (1.98 sq mi)
- Elevation: 17 m (56 ft)
- Highest elevation: 95 m (312 ft)
- Lowest elevation: 9 m (30 ft)
- Population (2023): 201
  - Density: 39.2/km^{2} (101/sq mi)
- Time zone: UTC+01:00 (CET)
  - Summer (DST): UTC+02:00 (CEST)
- INSEE/Postal code: 14731 /14800
- ^{1} French Land Register data, which excludes lakes, ponds, glaciers > 1 km^{2} (0.386 sq mi or 247 acres) and river estuaries.

Vauville (French pronunciation: [vovil]) is a commune in the Calvados department in the Normandy region in northwestern France.

== Population ==
Historical population
| Year | Pop. | ±% p.a. |
|---|---|---|
| 1968 | 211 | — |
| 1975 | 164 | −3.54% |
| 1982 | 184 | +1.66% |
| 1990 | 259 | +4.37% |
| 1999 | 253 | −0.26% |
| 2007 | 235 | −0.92% |
| 2012 | 205 | −2.69% |
| 2017 | 189 | −1.61% |
| 2023 | 201 | +1.03% |
Source: INSEE

== See also ==
- Communes of the Calvados department
