= Merville-Franceville-Plage =

- Commune
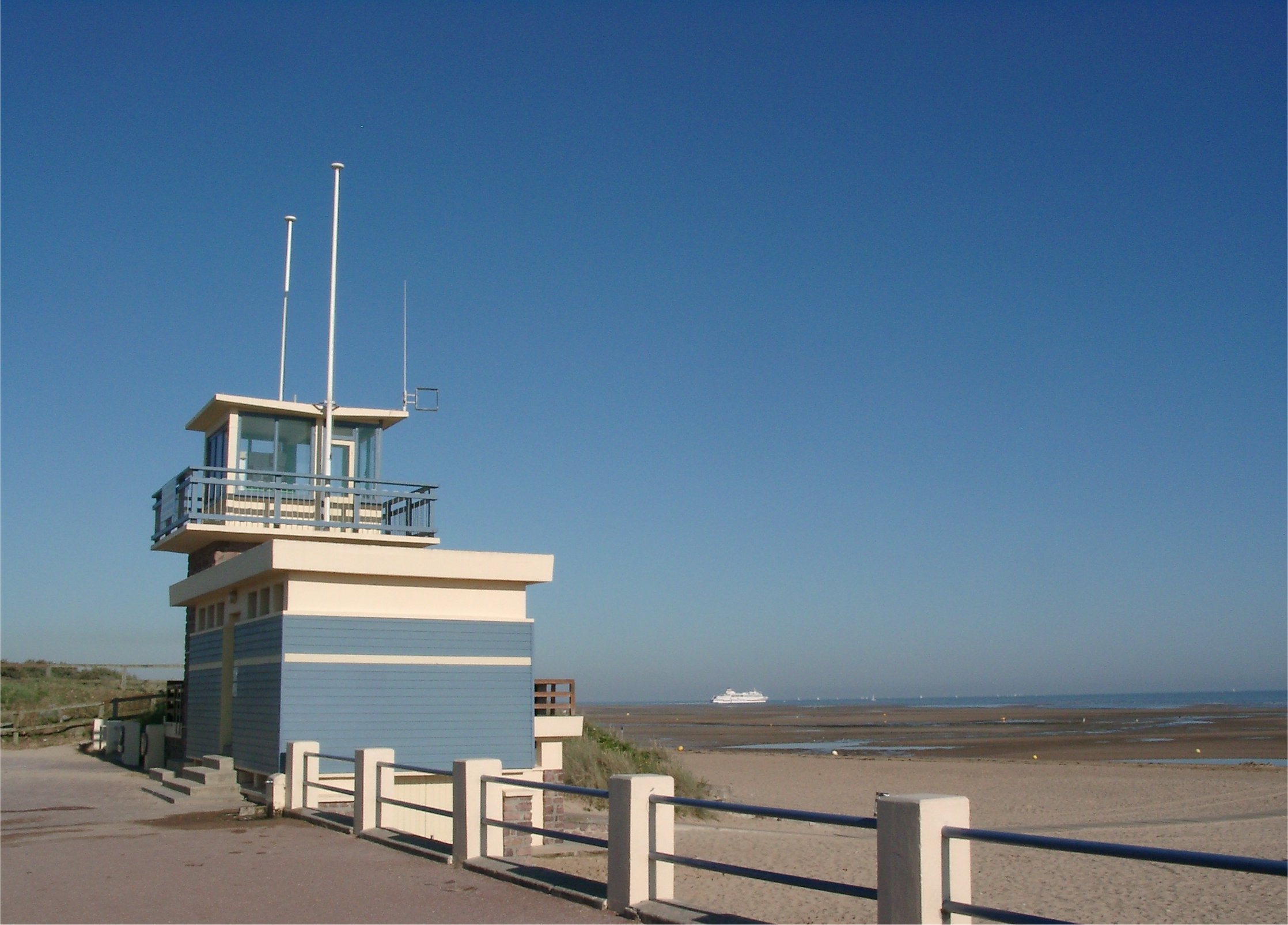
- First aid post

- Coat of arms
- Location of Merville-Franceville-Plage
- Location within France Location within Normandy
- Coordinates: 49°16′39″N 0°12′12″W
- Country: France
- Region: Normandy
- Department: Calvados
- Arrondissement: Lisieux
- Canton: Cabourg
- Intercommunality: CC Normandie-Cabourg-Pays d'Auge

Government
  - Mayor (2020–2026): Olivier Paz
- Area^{1}: 10.42 km^{2} (4.02 sq mi)
- Elevation: 14 m (46 ft)
- Highest elevation: 42 m (138 ft)
- Lowest elevation: 0 m (0 ft)
- Population (2023): 2,231
  - Density: 214.1/km^{2} (554.5/sq mi)
- Time zone: UTC+01:00 (CET)
  - Summer (DST): UTC+02:00 (CEST)
- INSEE/Postal code: 14409 /14810
- ^{1} French Land Register data, which excludes lakes, ponds, glaciers > 1 km^{2} (0.386 sq mi or 247 acres) and river estuaries.

Merville-Franceville-Plage (French pronunciation: [mɛʁvil fʁɑ̃svil plaʒ]) is a commune in the Calvados department in the Normandy region in northwestern France.

== Geography ==
Merville-Franceville-Plage, more usually called Franceville, is situated on the Côte Fleurie, 6 km from Cabourg and 14 km (8.7 mi) from Caen. Merville Franceville is located on the east side of the Baie de l'Orne.

The back country is a plain, favourable to cereal cultivation and dairy cattle.

== Population ==
Historical population
Year	Pop.	±% p.a.
1968	1,046	—
1975	1,184	+1.79%
1982	1,309	+1.44%
1990	1,317	+0.08%
1999	1,521	+1.61%
2007	1,753	+1.79%
2012	2,196	+4.61%
2017	2,169	−0.25%
2023	2,231	+0.47%
Source: INSEE

== Climate ==
The commune has a maritime climate : Winters are warm and summers rarely suffer from excessive heat.

== Sights ==
- Redoute de Merville, fortification edified on Vauban's plans in 1779. Rediscovered by the occupying forces during the Second World War.
- The Merville Gun Battery (Batterie de Merville) is an historic site situated on the eastern flank of the landing area codenamed Sword. Lieutenant-Colonel Terence Otway, and the 9th Parachute Battalion, neutralized the German battery during the Battle of Merville Gun Battery on 6 June prior to the beach landings.

== Tourism ==
Merville Franceville is attractive for families, thanks to the various beach activities and excursions in the back-country.

This town is famous for being a good spot for kite surfing.

== Twin towns ==
- Clyst St. Mary, England
- Merville, British Columbia, Canada

== See also ==
- Communes of the Calvados department

== Photos ==
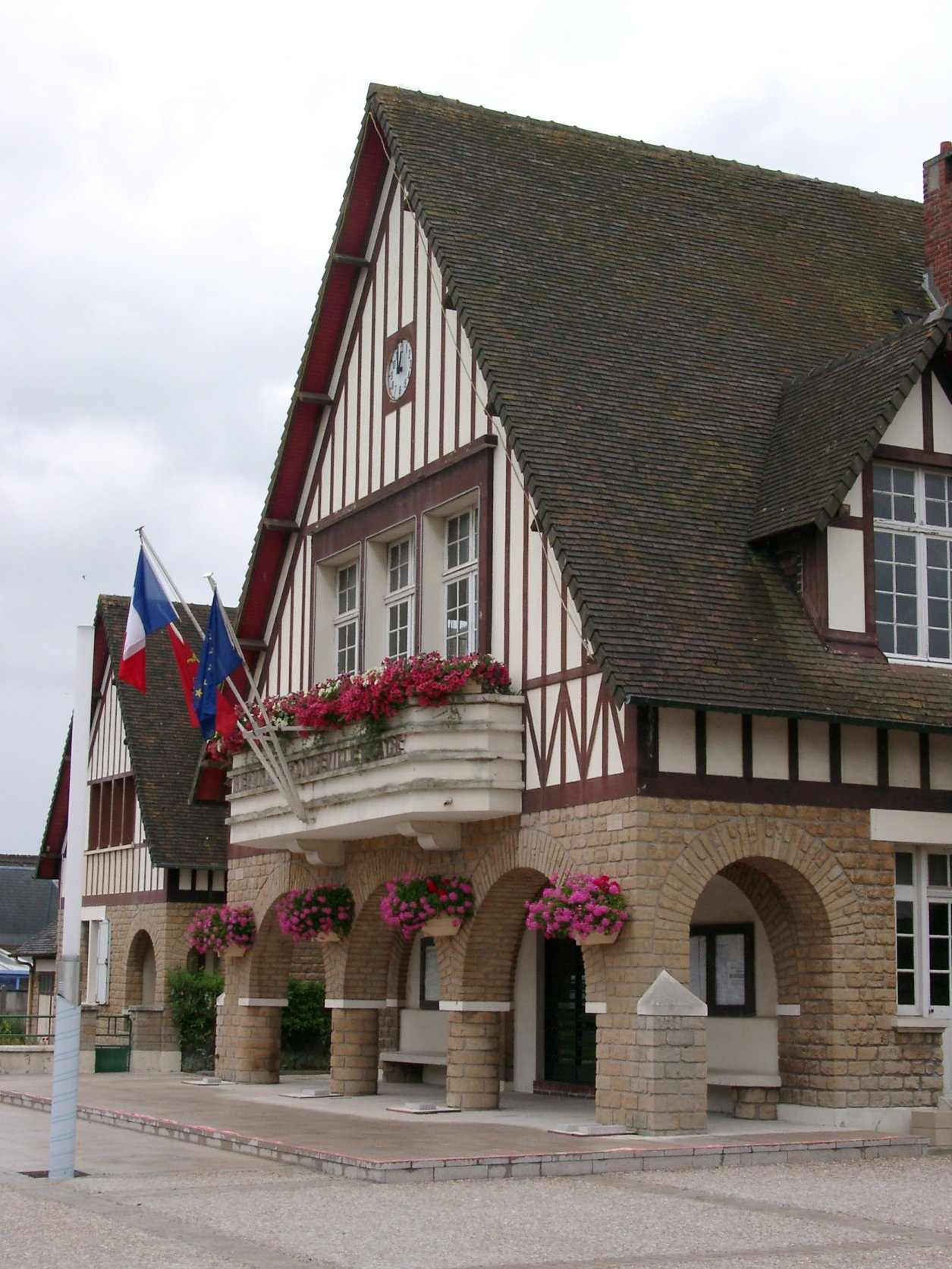
Town hall

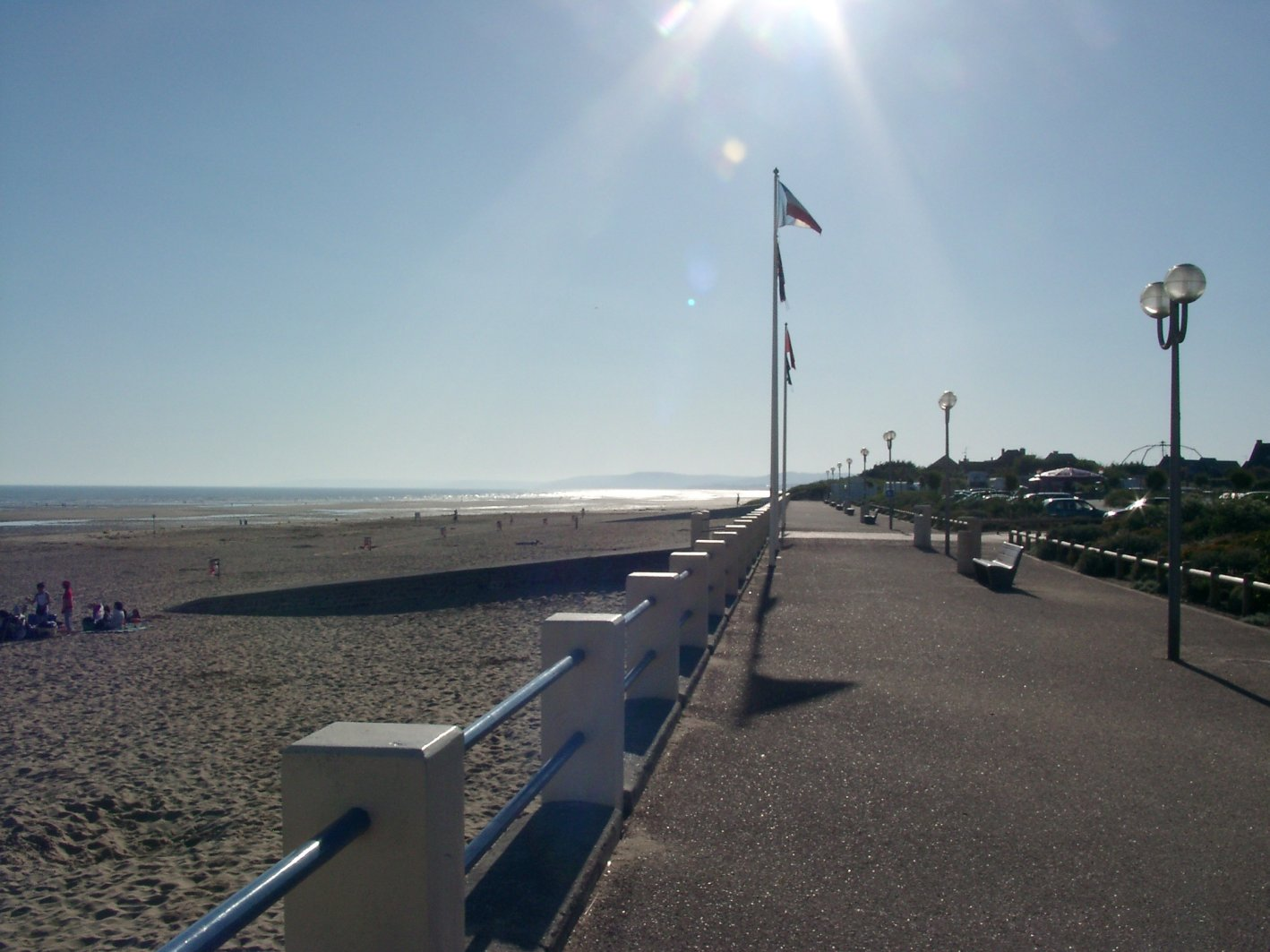
seafront

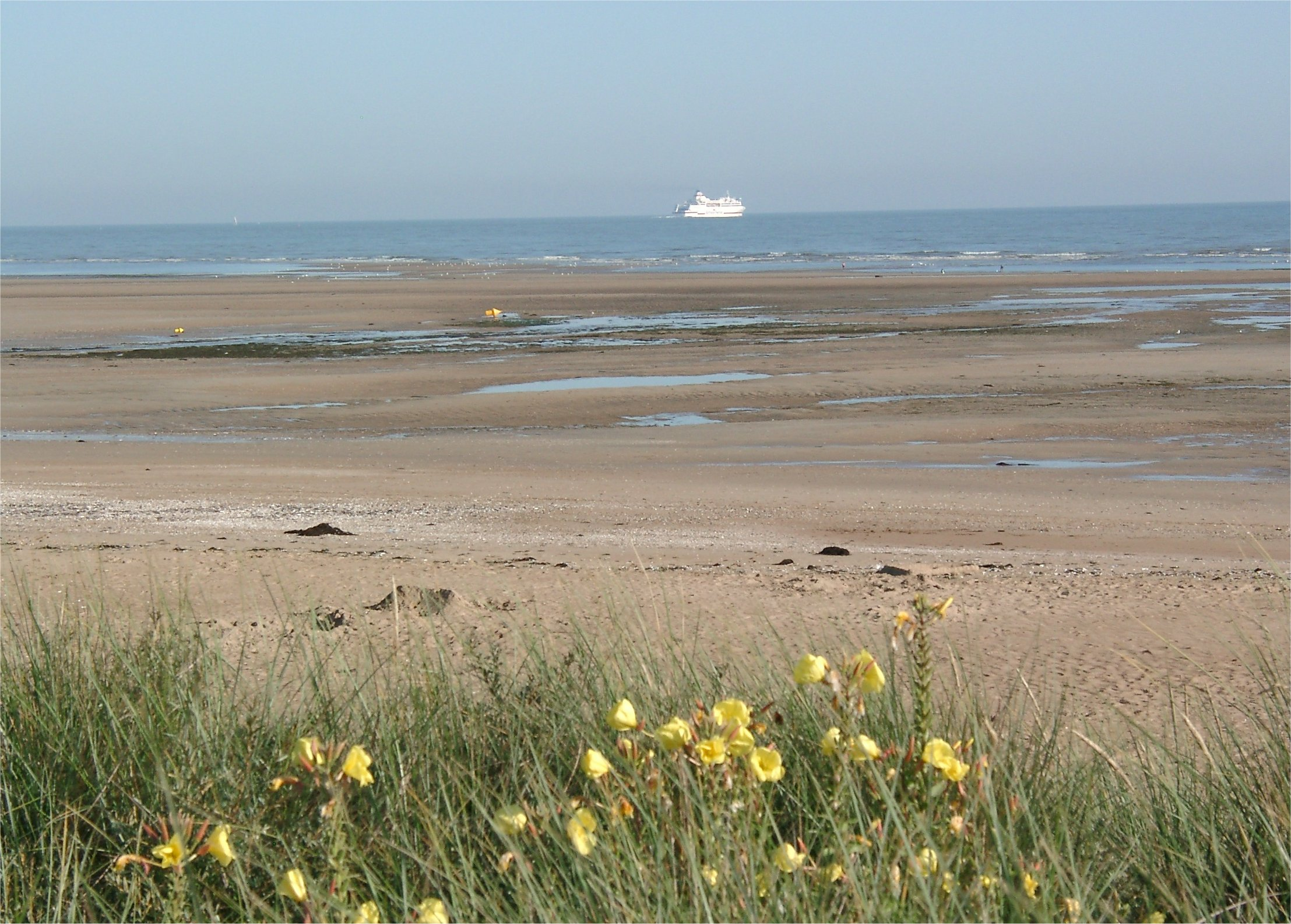
low tide

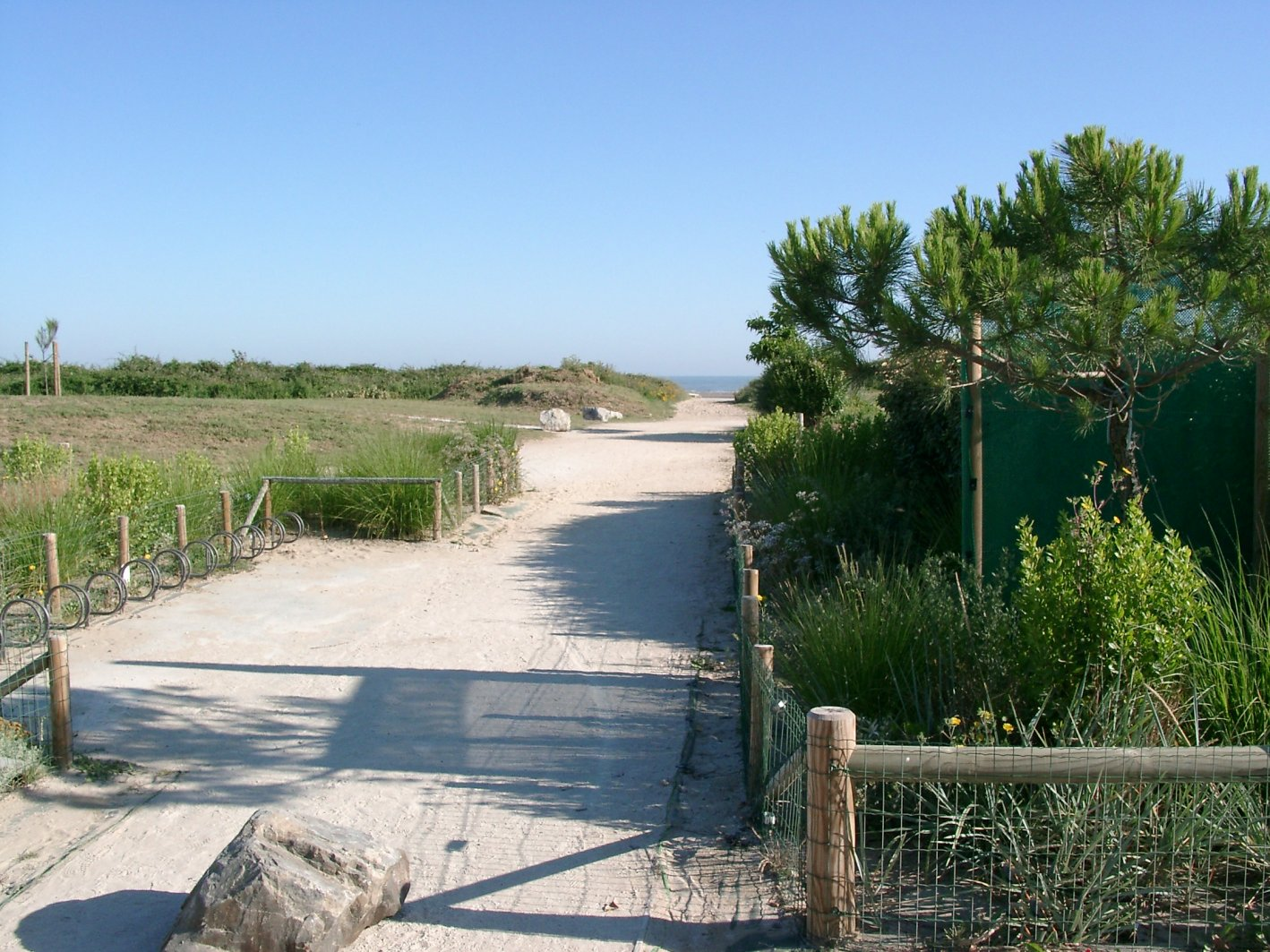
footpath to the beach

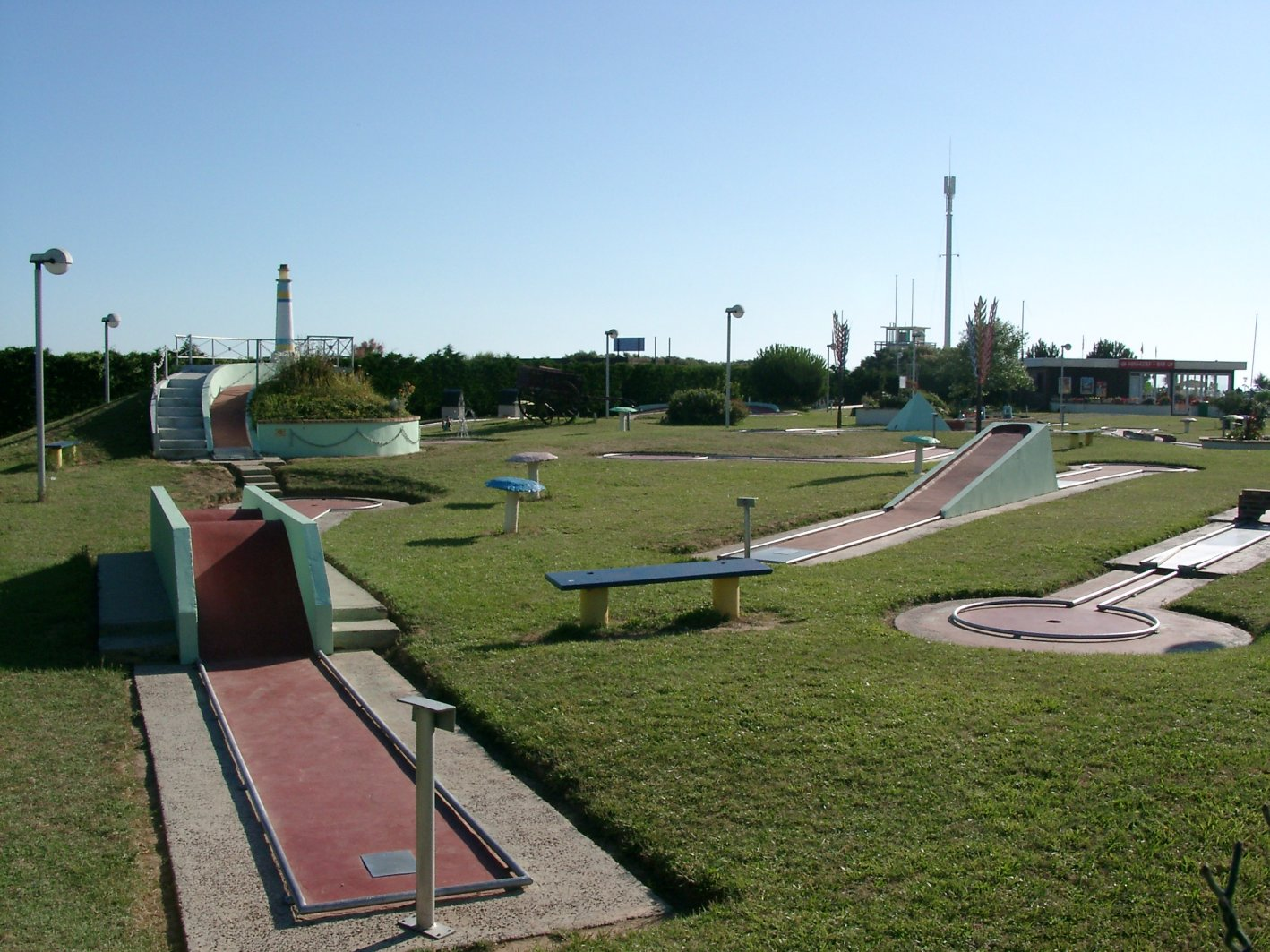
miniature golf

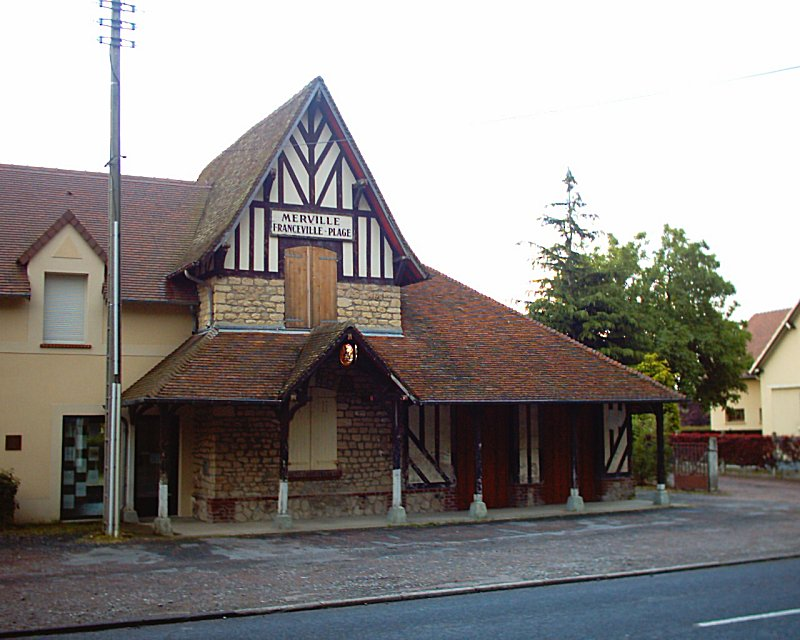
former railway station now solicitor office
