= Benerville-sur-Mer =

- Commune
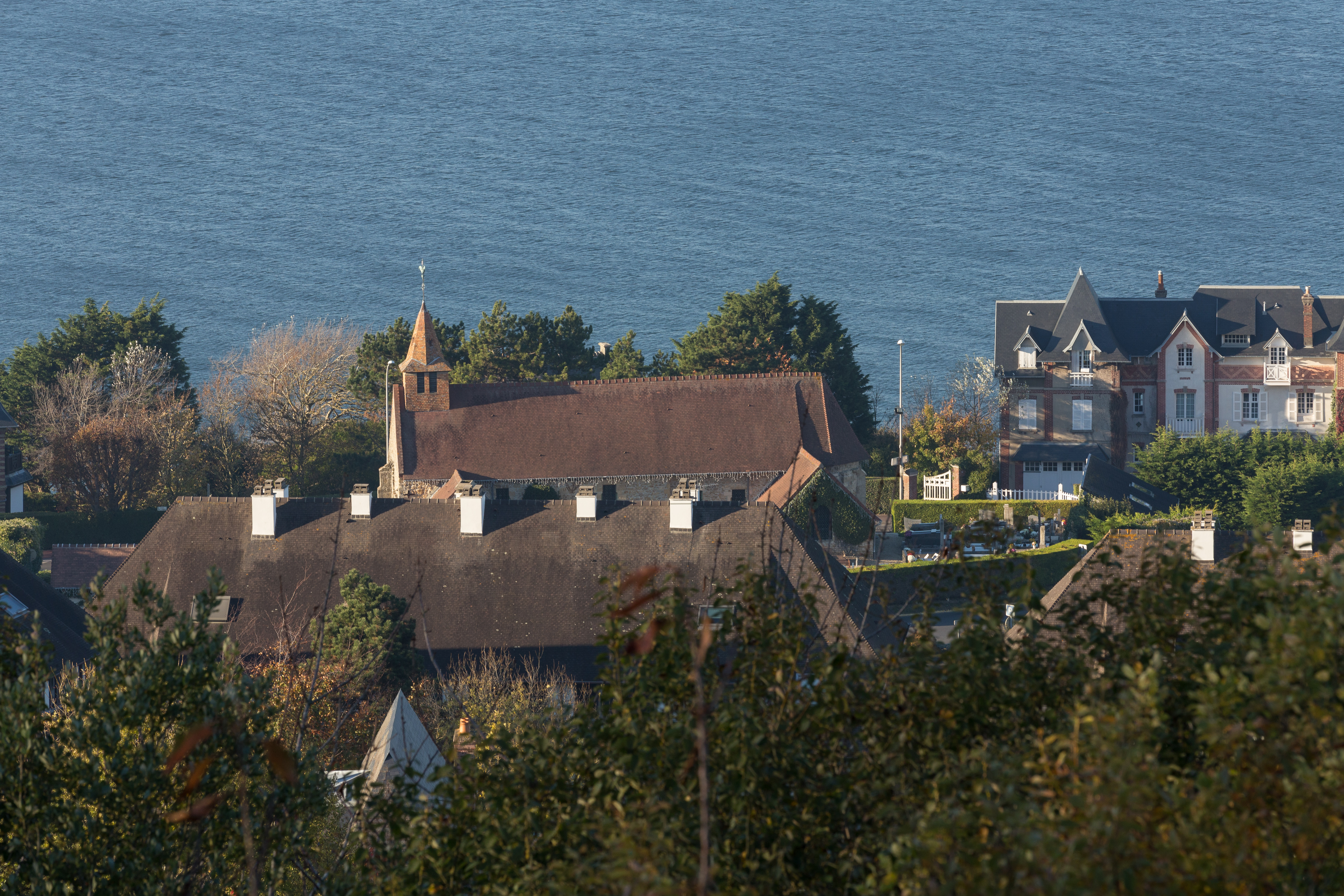
- Benerville-sur-Mer seen from Mont Canisy

- Coat of arms
- Location of Benerville-sur-Mer
- Location within France Location within Normandy
- Coordinates: 49°20′35″N 0°02′14″E
- Country: France
- Region: Normandy
- Department: Calvados
- Arrondissement: Lisieux
- Canton: Pont-l'Évêque
- Intercommunality: CC Cœur Côte Fleurie

Government
  - Mayor (2020–2026): Jacques Marie
- Area^{1}: 3.03 km^{2} (1.17 sq mi)
- Elevation: 112 m (367 ft)
- Highest elevation: 111 m (364 ft)
- Lowest elevation: 2 m (6.6 ft)
- Population (2023): 367
  - Density: 121/km^{2} (314/sq mi)
- Time zone: UTC+01:00 (CET)
  - Summer (DST): UTC+02:00 (CEST)
- INSEE/Postal code: 14059 /14910
- ^{1} French Land Register data, which excludes lakes, ponds, glaciers > 1 km^{2} (0.386 sq mi or 247 acres) and river estuaries.

Benerville-sur-Mer (French pronunciation: [bənɛʁvil syʁ mɛʁ]) is a commune in the Calvados department and Normandy region of north-western France.

== Population ==
Historical population
Year	Pop.	±% p.a.
1968	337	—
1975	361	+0.99%
1982	523	+5.44%
1990	411	−2.97%
1999	505	+2.31%
2007	494	−0.27%
2012	486	−0.33%
2017	420	−2.88%
2023	367	−2.22%
Source: INSEE

== See also ==
- Communes of the Calvados department
