= Kjell =

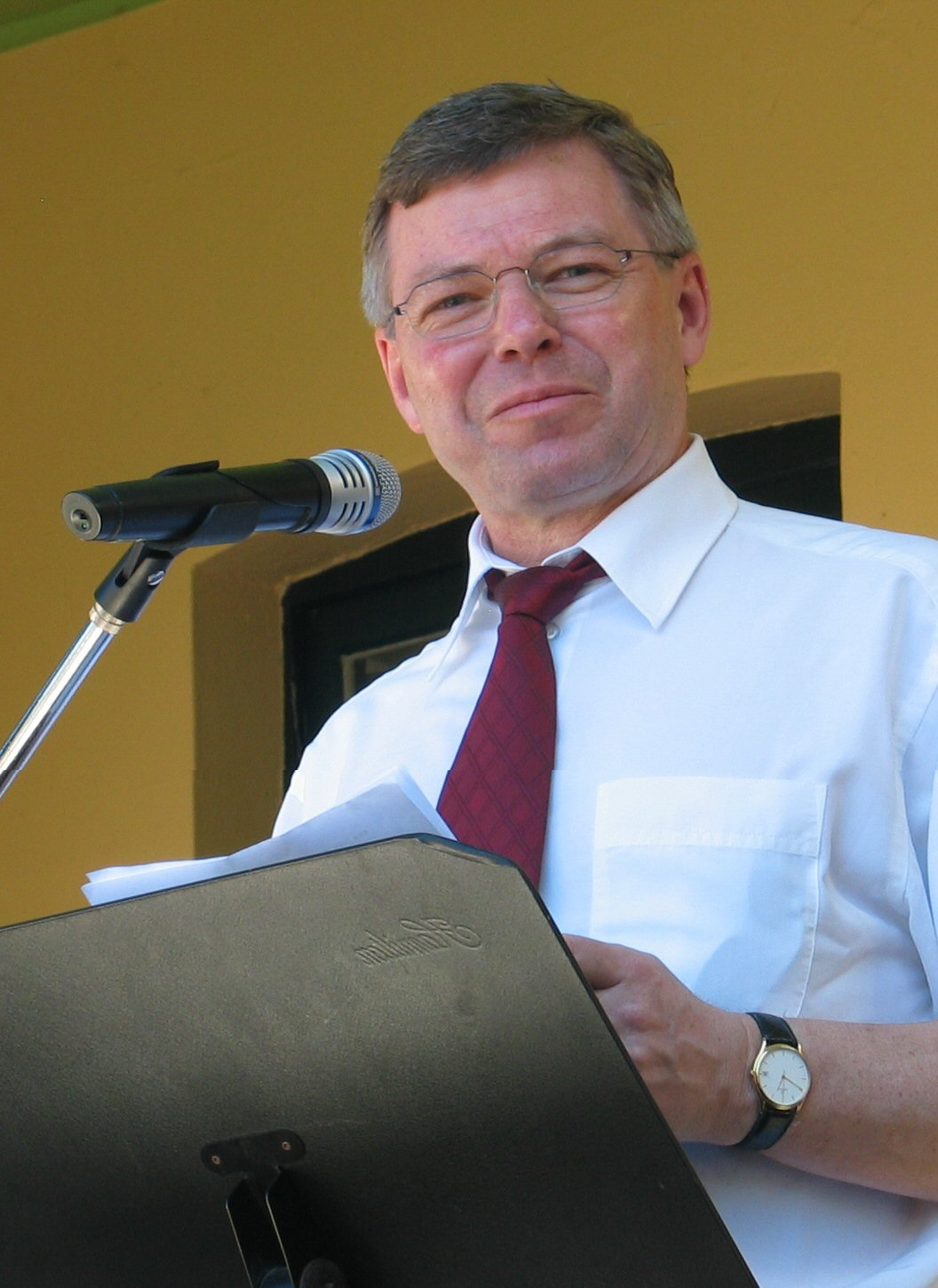
- Kjell Magne Bondevik, former prime minister of Norway
- Pronunciation: Swedish: [ˈɕɛlː]
- Gender: Male
- Language: Icelandic, Norwegian, Swedish, Danish including variants
- Name day: Norway (11 July); Denmark; Sweden (8 July); Finland (8 June)

Origin
- Origin: Old Norse ketill
- Meaning: Kettle, cauldron or helmet
- Region of origin: Norway; Sweden; Finland (Kjell); Denmark (Kjeld)

Other names
- Alternative spelling: Kjella (female)
- Variant forms: Kjeld, Keld, Kell, Kjell, Kield (Danish)
- Related names: Keld, Ketil, Ketill, Kittel, Kittil, Kjeld, Kjetil, Kjetill
- Popularity: see popular names

Kjell is a Scandinavian usually male given name. In Denmark, the cognate is Kjeld or Keld. The name comes from the Old Norse word kętill, which means "kettle" and probably also "helmet" or perhaps "cauldron". Examples of old spellings or forms are Ketill (Old Norse), Kjætil (Old Swedish) and Ketil (Old Danish). An equally likely meaning is a source, a hope that the boy will get ample resources to draw upon later in life.

Kjell has a name day on July 11 in Norway and July 8 in Sweden, and in Denmark with the variant Kjeld.

== Prevalence ==
In 2007, there were 59,011 men in Sweden with "Kjell" as their first name, making it the 42nd most common masculine name in Sweden. In Swedish and Norwegian it is pronounced with the voiceless alveolo-palatal sibilant fricative [ɕ]. There were 30,809 men in Norway with "Kjell" as their first name. This makes it the 5th most common masculine name in Norway. In Denmark, 8079 men were called "Kjeld" and 5491 "Keld". In Finland, the number of men called Kjell in 2008 was 1405.

The name began to be widely used in the 1600s when it took over from the older name form Kætil or Ketill, which were also precursors of the name Kjetil, and a loan from Latin catillus, which is the diminutive of catinus (= barrel, bowl). Kætil/Ketill was probably one of the most common male names in Old Norse times. In Landnámabók, it is the male name that occurs most often - even more frequently than the most widely used compositions with Tor-. There are 44 found runic inscriptions from the Viking era that contain the name Kætill, which is why it is the 13th most used male name in this material. Five of the inscriptions are found in Denmark and three in Norway, most others have unknown sites. The name was most often written with runes like ᚲᛖᛏᛁᛚ (ketil), ᚲᛁᛏᛁᛚ (kitil) or ᚲᚨᛏᛁᛚ (katil).

In Denmark the name appears in many village (torp) names, so there are nearly 20 places named Kelstrup or Kjelstrup. However, the name does not appear in compositions with -lev, and it can only be explained that it was not used at the time when -lev names were formed. Consequently, we can date the period when Kætil/Ketill was used as a name, at the time between the end of the Migration Period and the beginning of the Viking Age. But the reason that the name gained such tremendous prevalence within a few centuries, we do not know.

The name Kjell is known in Norway from the 1400s. In recent times, the name was widely used in the 1940s and 50s, but is now rarely used for newborn boys.

Historical development of the popularity of the name Kjell in Norway.

In Sweden, the name was most popular in the 1940s.

Historical development of the popularity of the name Kjell in Sweden.

Kjell is today a common name in Norway and Sweden, and Kjeld or Keld is common in Denmark.

The following table provides a detailed overview of the popularity of the male name Kjell and its variants in some of the countries where statistics are available.

Country	Variant	Among the country's population			Among newborns		
Country	Variant	Number	Percent	Ranking	Number	Percent	Ranking
Norway	Kjell	28,834 (2012)	1%	6	10 (2006)	0.03%	308
Sweden	Kjell	33,420 (2010)	0.7%	32			
Norway	Kjetil	10,247 (2012)	0.4%	53	9 (2006)	0.03%	325
Denmark	Kjeld	7,275 (2013)	0.3%	ca. 131			
Denmark	Keld	5,197 (2013)	0.2%	ca. 153			
Norway	Ketil	2,578 (2012)	0.10%	194			
Germany	Kjell				(2012)		253
Finland	Kjell	1,451	0.05%	ca. 272			
Iceland	Ketill	50 (2012)	0.03%	ca. 352			
Denmark	Kell	403 (2013)	0.01%	ca. 492			
Netherlands	Kjeld				22 (2012)	0.02%	591
Faroe Islands	Kjell	6 (2006)	0.01%	670			
Faroe Islands	Kjeld	6 (2006)	0.01%	670			
Denmark	Kjell	197 (2013)	0.007%	ca. 683			
Netherlands	Kjell				18 (2012)	0.02%	695
Denmark	Ketil	129 (2013)	0.005%	ca. 828			

== Name compositions ==
Kjell is found in many name compositions, both of the old date, written in one word, or in new ones, which are written in two words.

- Female names: Kjellaug, Kjellrun, Kjellfrid, Audkjell, Kjella, Kjellbjørg
- Male names: Torkel, Arnkjell, Askjell, Finnkjell, Grimkjell, Hallkjell, Kjellbjørn, Kjellfred, Torkjell

Newer: Kjell Inge, Kjell Magne, Kjell Einar osv.

Kjell is also present in at least one notable Swedish surname: Kjellberg.

== People ==
=== A ===
- Kjell Almskog (born 1941), Norwegian businessman
- Kjell Anneling (born 1938), Swedish diplomat
- Kjell Askildsen (1929–2021), Norwegian writer
- Kjell Aukrust (1920–2002), Norwegian poet, author and artist

=== B ===
- Kjell Bækkelund (1930–2004), Norwegian classical pianist
- Kjell Bäckman (1934–2019), Swedish speed skater
- Kjell Berg (born 1962), Norwegian curler
- Kjell Bergqvist (born 1953), Swedish actor
- Kjell Bjartveit (1927–2011), Norwegian physician and politician
- Kjell Bohlin (1928–2011), Norwegian politician
- Kjell Bondevik (1901–1983), Norwegian politician and uncle of Kjell Magne
- Kjell Magne Bondevik (born 1947), former Norwegian prime minister and nephew of Kjell
- Kjell Borgen (1939–1996), Norwegian politician

=== C ===
- Kjell Carlström (born 1976), Finnish cyclist
- Kjell Colding (1931–2009), Norwegian diplomat and politician

=== D ===
- Kjell Dahlin (born 1963), Swedish ice hockey player

=== E ===
- Kjell Elvis (born 1968), Norwegian Elvis impersonator
- Kjell Engebretsen (born 1941), Norwegian politician
- Kjell Eriksson (born 1953), Swedish author
- Kjell Espmark (1930–2022), Swedish author

=== F ===
- Kjell Fjalsett (born 1952), Norwegian musician
- Kjell Fjørtoft (1930–2010), Norwegian journalist and writer

=== G ===
- Kjell Gjerseth (1946–2025), Norwegian novelist and journalist
- Kjell Grede (1936–2017), Swedish film director
- Kjell Grengmark (1935–2022), Swedish curler

=== H ===
- Kjell Håkonsen (1935–2011), Norwegian harness racing coach
- Kjell Hallbing (1934–2004), Norwegian author
- Kjell Heggelund (1932–2017), Norwegian literary researcher and lecturer
- Kjell Helland (born 1940), Norwegian politician
- Kjell Henriksen (1938–1996), Norwegian scientist
- Kjell Höglund (born 1945), Swedish singer
- Kjell Holler (1925–2000), Norwegian politician
- Kjell Holmström (1916–1999), Swedish bobsledder
- Kjell Hovda (born 1945), Norwegian biathlete

=== I ===
- Kjell Isaksson (born 1948), Swedish pole vault world record holder

=== J ===
- Kjell Jansson (born 1959), Swedish politician
- Kjell Jennstig (born 1960), Swedish musician
- Kjell Johansson (disambiguation)
- Kjell Jonevret (born 1962), Swedish football manager and former player

=== K ===
- Kjell Kaspersen (born 1939), Norwegian footballer
- Kjell Kjær (1942–2025), Norwegian actor, puppeteer, director, and program host
- Kjell Knudsen (1931–2022), Norwegian politician
- Kjell Koserius (1943–2002), Swedish Air Force major general

=== L ===
- Kjell Larsson (1943–2002), Swedish politician
- Kjell Eugenio Laugerud García (1930–2009), President of Guatemala
- Kjell Lauri, Swedish orienteer
- Kjell N. Lindgren (born 1973), US astronaut
- Kjell Lönnå (1936–2022), Swedish choir leader and composer

=== N ===
- Kjell Nilsson (disambiguation)
- Kjell Nordström (politician) (born 1949), Swedish politician
- Kjell A. Nordström (born 1958), Swedish economist, writer and public speaker

=== O ===
- Kjell Olofsson (born 1965), Swedish footballer
- Kjell Opseth (1936–2017), Norwegian politician
- Kjell Oscarius (born 1943), Swedish curler
- Kjell-Arne Ottosson (born 1975), Swedish politician
- Kjell Øvergård (born 1947), Norwegian politician
- Kjell Qvale (1919–2013), Norwegian-American business executive

=== R ===
- Kjell Risvik (1941–2021), Norwegian translator
- Kjell Rodian (1942–2007), Danish cyclist
- Kjell Inge Røkke (born 1958), Norwegian investor
- Kjell Roos (born 1956), Swedish musician

=== S ===
- Kjell Samuelsson (born 1958), Swedish hockey player
- Kjell Bloch Sandved (1922–2015), Norwegian author and lecturer
- Kjell Scherpen (born 2000), Dutch footballer
- Kjell Schneider (born 1976), German beach volleyball player
- Kjell Sjöberg (1937–2013), Swedish ski jumper
- Kjell Søbak (born 1957), Norwegian biathlete
- Kjell-Erik Ståhl (1946–2025), Swedish long-distance runner
- Kjell Storelid (born 1970), Norwegian speed skater
- Kjell Stormoen (1921–2010), Norwegian actor and theatre director
- Kjell Storvik (born 1930), Norwegian economist and former Governor of the Central Bank of Norway
- Kjell Sundvall (born 1953), Swedish director
- Kjell Svindland (1933–2025), Norwegian politician

=== W ===
- Kjell Westö (born 1961), Finnish author

== See also ==
- Kell
- Ketil
- Kjeld
- Kjetil
- HNoMS Kjell
