= Kjeld =

Kjeld is a person name derived from the Old Norse and may refer to:

== Given name ==
- Saint Kjeld (fl. 1100–1150), Danish clergyman
- Kjeld Abell (1901–1961), Danish playwright and theatrical designer
- Kjeld Ammentorp (1895–1975), Danish-British businessesman
- Kjeld Bonfils (1918–1984), Danish jazz pianist and vibraphone player
- Kjeld Hillingsø (born 1935), Danish Army general
- Kjeld Stub Irgens (1879–1963), Norwegian politician
- Kjeld Jacobsen (1915–1970), Danish actor
- Kjeld Kirk Kristiansen (born 1947), the president and CEO of Lego between 1979 and 2004
- Kjeld Langeland (1920–1973), Norwegian politician for the Conservative Party
- Kjeld Nielsen (1887–1910), Danish athlete
- Kjeld Nuis (born 1989), Dutch speed skater
- Kjeld Olesen (born 1932), Danish former Social Democratic politician
- Kjeld Østrøm (born 1933), Danish rower
- Kjeld Petersen (1920–1962), Danish film actor
- Kjeld Philip (1912–1989), Danish economist and politician representing the Danish Social Liberal Party
- Kjeld Rimberg (born 1943), Norwegian businessman
- Kjeld Steen (1925–2005), Danish boxer
- Kjeld Stub (1607–1663), Danish-Norwegian priest
- Kjeld Stub (1868–1955), Norwegian priest and politician
- Kjeld Thorst (born 1940), Danish footballer
- Kjeld Toft-Christensen (1910–1945), Danish Special Operations Executive officer WWII resistance fighter
- Kjeld Tolstrup (1965–2011), Danish radio DJ
- Kjeld Vibe (1927–2011), Norwegian diplomat

== Middle name ==
- Hans Kjeld Rasmussen (born 1954), Danish sports shooter and Olympic Champion

== See also ==
- Ketil
- Kjetil
- Kjell
