= Kjellberg =

Kjellberg may refer to:

== People ==
- Agnes de Frumerie née Kjellberg (1869–1937), Swedish artist
- Anna Kjellberg (born 1984), Swedish Olympic sailor
- Bertil Kjellberg (born 1953), Swedish politician of the Moderate Party
- Ellen Kjellberg (born 1948), Norwegian dancer
- Felix Kjellberg (born 1989), better known as PewDiePie, Swedish web-based comedian and video producer
- Friedl Kjellberg (1905-1993), Austrian-born Finnish ceramist
- Lennart Kjellberg (1857–1936), Swedish archaeologist
- Marzia Kjellberg (born 1992), Italian internet personality and entrepreneur, wife of Felix
- Oscar Kjellberg (1870–1931), Swedish inventor and industrialist
- Patric Kjellberg (born 1969), Swedish ice hockey player
- Peder Kjellberg (1902–1975), Norwegian boxer
- Reidar Kjellberg (1904–1978), Norwegian art historian and museum director
- L. Viktoria Tolstoy née Kjellberg (born 1974), Swedish jazz singer

== Other uses ==
- Anders Kjellberg Farm, a building in Indiana, United States
- Kjellberg Finsterwalde, a group of German companies in the metal and electrical industry
- Kjellberg Peak, a small rock peak in Antarctica

== See also ==
- Kjell Berg, Norwegian curler
