= Böhlau =

Böhlau or Boehlau may refer to:

- Helene Böhlau (1859–1940), a German novelist
- Johannes Boehlau (1861–1941), a German archaeologist
- Böhlau Verlag, a publishing house
