= Saint-Gatien-des-Bois =

- Commune
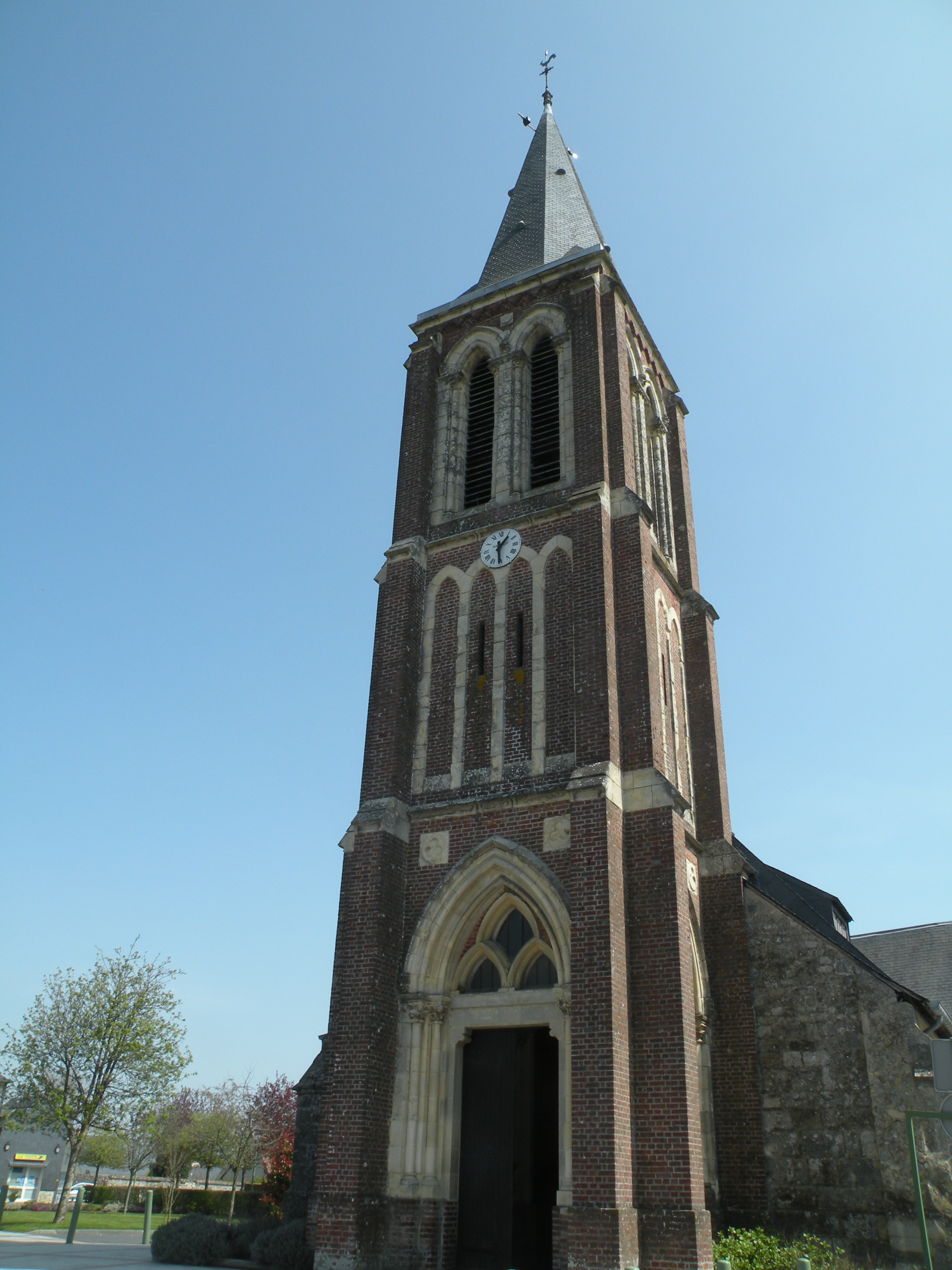
- The church in Saint-Gatien-des-Bois

- Coat of arms
- Location of Saint-Gatien-des-Bois
- Location within France Location within Normandy
- Coordinates: 49°20′55″N 0°11′10″E
- Country: France
- Region: Normandy
- Department: Calvados
- Arrondissement: Lisieux
- Canton: Honfleur-Deauville
- Intercommunality: CC Cœur Côte Fleurie

Government
  - Mayor (2020–2026): Philippe Langlois
- Area^{1}: 49.11 km^{2} (18.96 sq mi)
- Elevation: 150 m (490 ft)
- Highest elevation: 153 m (502 ft)
- Lowest elevation: 30 m (98 ft)
- Population (2023): 1,295
  - Density: 26.37/km^{2} (68.30/sq mi)
- Time zone: UTC+01:00 (CET)
  - Summer (DST): UTC+02:00 (CEST)
- INSEE/Postal code: 14578 /14130
- ^{1} French Land Register data, which excludes lakes, ponds, glaciers > 1 km^{2} (0.386 sq mi or 247 acres) and river estuaries.

Saint-Gatien-des-Bois (French pronunciation: [sɛ̃ ɡasjɛ̃ de bwa]) is a commune in the Calvados in the Normandy region in northwestern France.

== History ==
Saint-Gatien-des-Bois is located approximately 150 miles northwest of Paris, a few miles from Deauville along the English Channel, and near the port of Honfleur. The name Gatien (also rendered as Grathien) is derived from Gatianus, a bishop of Tours. In the 17th century, the settlement was a small village with a population of fewer than 500 inhabitants.

== Geography ==
Saint-Gatien-des-Bois has an average elevation of approximately 145 metres and covers an area of 49.11 square kilometres. It is located at a latitude of 49.347° north and a longitude of 0.187° east. Nearby communes include Tourville-en-Auge (2.82 km), Englesqueville-en-Auge (3.36 km), Fourneville (3.67 km), Saint-Martin-aux-Chartrains (4.30 km), and Barneville-la-Bertran (4.44 km).

== Climate ==
Climate data for Saint-Gatien-des-Bois (1991–2020 averages)
Month	Jan	Feb	Mar	Apr	May	Jun	Jul	Aug	Sep	Oct	Nov	Dec	Year
Record high °C (°F)	16.8 (62.2)	20.9 (69.6)	24.2 (75.6)	26.7 (80.1)	30.6 (87.1)	35.0 (95.0)	39.4 (102.9)	37.7 (99.9)	33.2 (91.8)	28.9 (84.0)	21.3 (70.3)	16.4 (61.5)	39.4 (102.9)
Mean daily maximum °C (°F)	7.4 (45.3)	8.2 (46.8)	11.0 (51.8)	13.9 (57.0)	16.9 (62.4)	19.7 (67.5)	21.6 (70.9)	21.7 (71.1)	19.2 (66.6)	15.3 (59.5)	10.9 (51.6)	8.1 (46.6)	14.5 (58.1)
Daily mean °C (°F)	5.0 (41.0)	5.3 (41.5)	7.5 (45.5)	9.7 (49.5)	12.7 (54.9)	15.5 (59.9)	17.4 (63.3)	17.5 (63.5)	15.2 (59.4)	12.0 (53.6)	8.2 (46.8)	5.5 (41.9)	11.0 (51.8)
Mean daily minimum °C (°F)	2.5 (36.5)	2.4 (36.3)	4.1 (39.4)	5.6 (42.1)	8.5 (47.3)	11.3 (52.3)	13.2 (55.8)	13.4 (56.1)	11.1 (52.0)	8.7 (47.7)	5.4 (41.7)	3.0 (37.4)	7.4 (45.3)
Record low °C (°F)	−17.8 (0.0)	−14.2 (6.4)	−9.1 (15.6)	−3.3 (26.1)	−0.6 (30.9)	1.3 (34.3)	5.9 (42.6)	6.0 (42.8)	2.1 (35.8)	−3.1 (26.4)	−7.1 (19.2)	−10.3 (13.5)	−17.8 (0.0)
Average precipitation mm (inches)	77.9 (3.07)	64.4 (2.54)	61.2 (2.41)	60.4 (2.38)	65.3 (2.57)	68.3 (2.69)	64.2 (2.53)	81.4 (3.20)	80.4 (3.17)	95.3 (3.75)	94.5 (3.72)	107.1 (4.22)	920.4 (36.24)
Average precipitation days (≥ 1.0 mm)	13.8	12.0	11.4	10.5	10.3	9.8	9.8	10.3	10.6	13.2	14.5	15.3	141.4
Mean monthly sunshine hours	66.8	81.4	127.6	177.9	190.0	203.3	205.3	196.2	160.0	113.4	70.7	58.3	1,650.7
Source: Meteociel

== Population and housing ==
Historical population
Year	Pop.	±% p.a.
1968	807	—
1975	983	+2.86%
1982	1,054	+1.00%
1990	1,182	+1.44%
1999	1,163	−0.18%
2007	1,333	+1.72%
2012	1,313	−0.30%
2017	1,314	+0.02%
2023	1,295	−0.24%
Source: INSEE

In 2022, the commune had an estimated 921 dwellings, comprising 572 primary residences, 298 secondary or occasional residences, and 51 vacant dwellings.

== See also ==
- Communes of the Calvados department
