= Byfuglien =

Byfuglien is a surname. Notable people with the surname include:

- Dustin Byfuglien (born 1985), American professional ice hockey player
- Helga Haugland Byfuglien (born 1950), Norwegian Lutheran bishop
- Kjetil Byfuglien (born 1977), Norwegian footballer
