= Quetteville =

- Commune
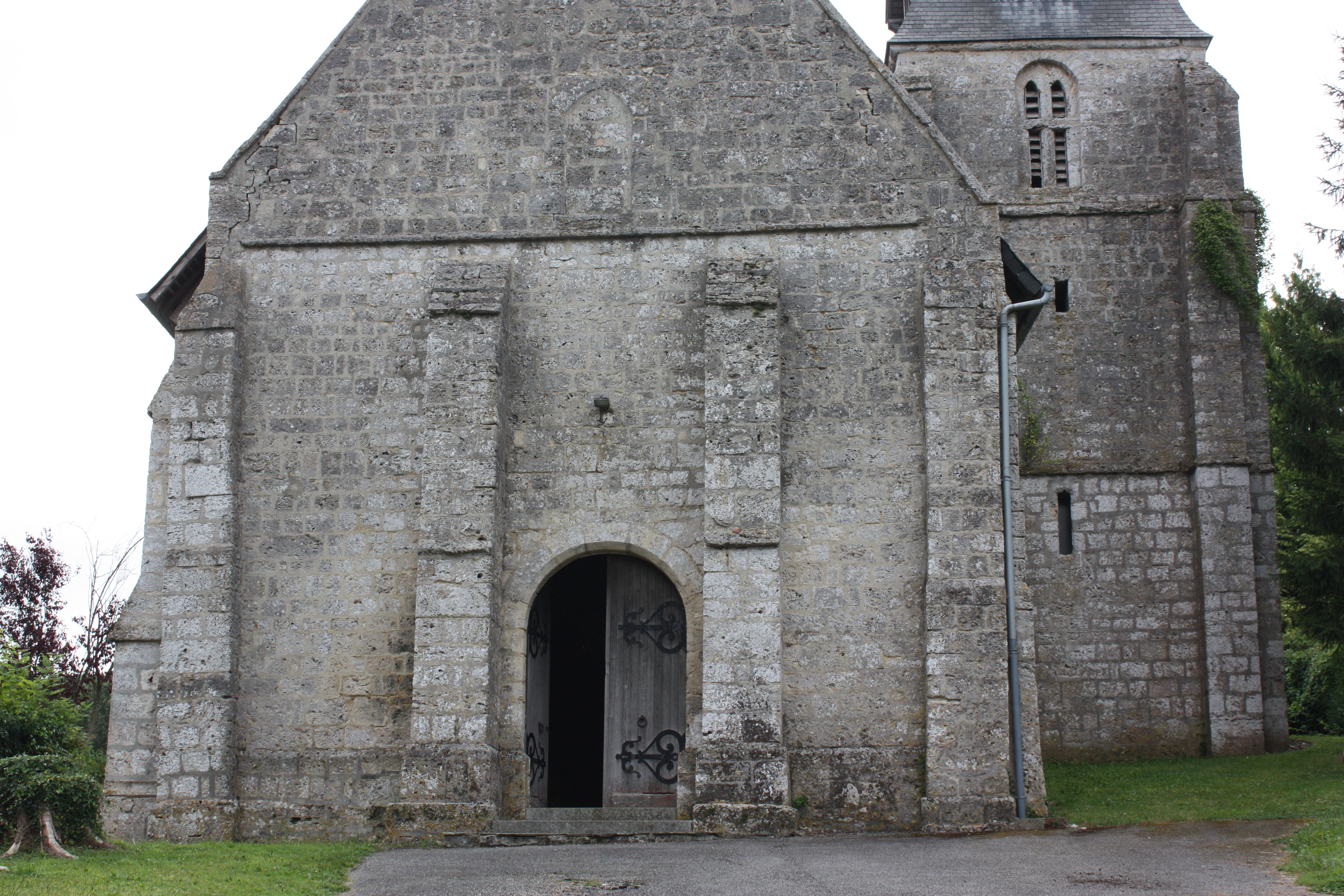
- The church in Quetteville
- Location of Quetteville
- Location within France Location within Normandy
- Coordinates: 49°20′15″N 0°18′34″E
- Country: France
- Region: Normandy
- Department: Calvados
- Arrondissement: Lisieux
- Canton: Honfleur-Deauville
- Intercommunality: Pays de Honfleur-Beuzeville

Government
  - Mayor (2020–2026): Richard Griset
- Area^{1}: 10.32 km^{2} (3.98 sq mi)
- Elevation: 85 m (279 ft)
- Highest elevation: 141 m (463 ft)
- Lowest elevation: 30 m (98 ft)
- Population (2023): 397
  - Density: 38.5/km^{2} (99.6/sq mi)
- Time zone: UTC+01:00 (CET)
  - Summer (DST): UTC+02:00 (CEST)
- INSEE/Postal code: 14528 /14130
- ^{1} French Land Register data, which excludes lakes, ponds, glaciers > 1 km^{2} (0.386 sq mi or 247 acres) and river estuaries.

Quetteville (French pronunciation: [kɛtvil]) is a commune in the Calvados department in the Normandy region in northwestern France.

The name of the city is derived from the Latin Ketelvilla, meaning Ketil's villa. Ketil was probably the name of a Viking settler.

The surname DeQuetteville is derived from the city's name.

== Population ==
Historical population
Year	Pop.	±% p.a.
1968	303	—
1975	251	−2.65%
1982	221	−1.80%
1990	263	+2.20%
1999	295	+1.28%
2007	375	+3.04%
2012	371	−0.21%
2017	375	+0.21%
2023	397	+0.95%
Source: INSEE

== See also ==
- Communes of the Calvados department
