= Kitl =

Kitl or KITL may refer to:

- Kittel, a Jewish ritual garment
- Stem cell factor, or KIT ligand
- KZTN-LD, a low-power television station (channel 20) licensed to serve Boise, Idaho, United States, which held the call sign KITL-LP or KITL-LD from 2002 to 2013

== See also ==
- Kjetil, a Norwegian masculine name
