= Ablon =

- Commune
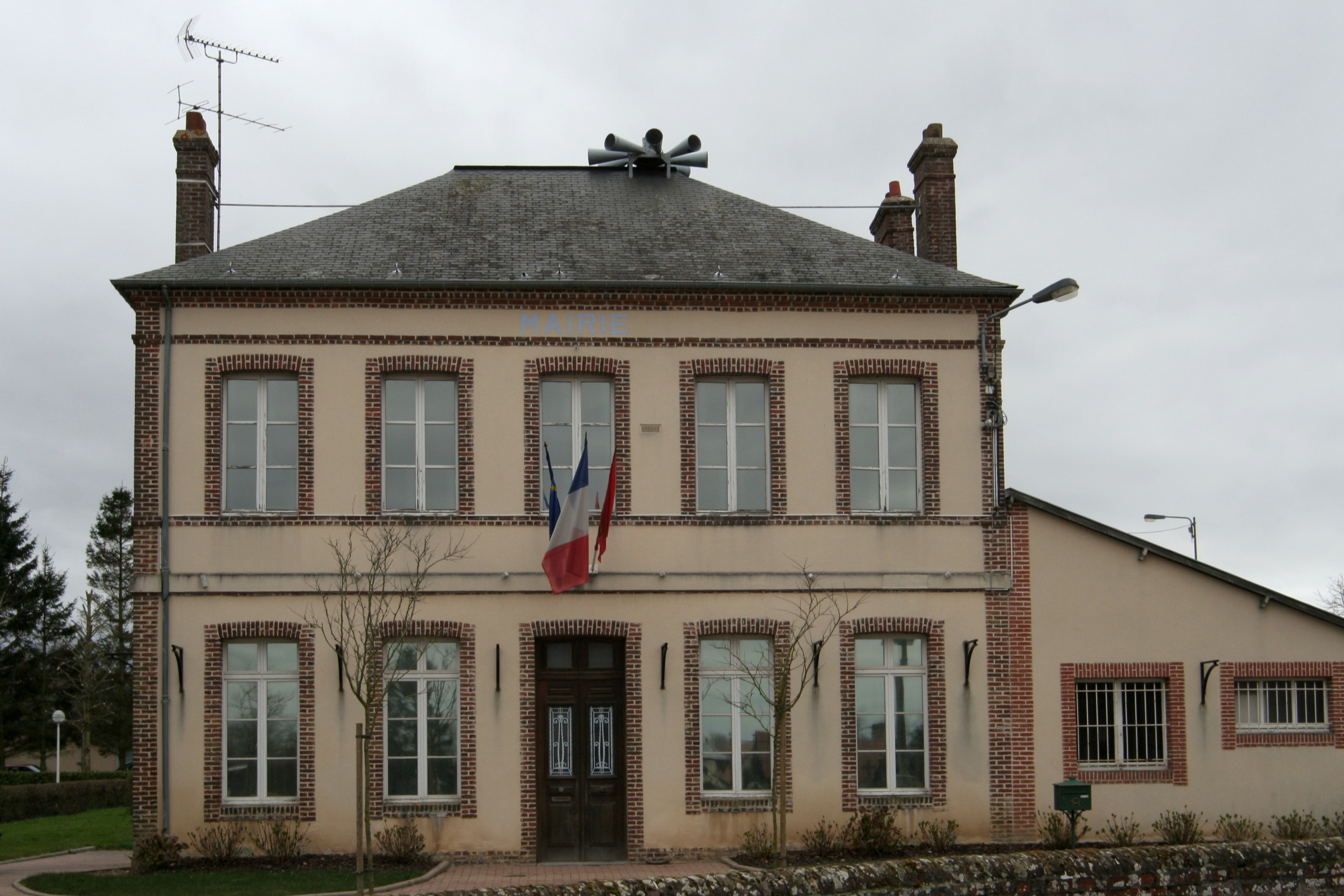
- Ablon Town Hall
- Location of Ablon
- Location within France Location within Normandy
- Coordinates: 49°23′39″N 0°17′48″E
- Country: France
- Region: Normandy
- Department: Calvados
- Arrondissement: Lisieux
- Canton: Honfleur-Deauville
- Intercommunality: Pays de Honfleur-Beuzeville

Government
  - Mayor (2020–2026): Xavier Canu
- Area^{1}: 12 km^{2} (4.6 sq mi)
- Elevation: 98 m (322 ft)
- Highest elevation: 118 m (387 ft)
- Lowest elevation: 0 m (0 ft)
- Population (2023): 1,166
  - Density: 97/km^{2} (250/sq mi)
- Demonym(s): Ablonnais, Ablonnaises
- Time zone: UTC+01:00 (CET)
  - Summer (DST): UTC+02:00 (CEST)
- INSEE/Postal code: 14001 /14600
- ^{1} French Land Register data, which excludes lakes, ponds, glaciers > 1 km^{2} (0.386 sq mi or 247 acres) and river estuaries.

Ablon (French pronunciation: [ablɔ̃]) is a commune in the Calvados department in the Normandy region in northwestern France.

== Geography ==
Ablon is 5 km south east of Honfleur and 16 km north-west of Pont-Audemer with its northern border on the Seine Estuary. It can be reached on Highway D580A from Honfleur turning right on the small country road called Cote de Vats to reach the village of Ablon. Road D140 (Route de Genneville) from Genneville in the south passes through the western side of the commune to join the D580a just outside the commune. The D144 road forms the southern border of the commune. Ablon is in the north-eastern corner of the Calvados department with its eastern border being the departmental border with Eure.

The Morelle river passes through the north of the commune from east to west although oddly does not form part of the commune. The Canal de Retour is parallel to it but also does not form part of the commune.

== Toponymy ==
The name of the village is attested as far back as 1180 as Abelon.

One theory states that the town's name comes from the Norse Epi-lundr, meaning “apple orchard”. The nearby village of Yébleron shares this etymology. The ancient scandinavian lundr meaning orchard or wood has regularly been followed by the suffix -lon (for example, Bouquelon, Écaquelon, Yquelon, etc.).

Another theory suggests that the town's name derives from the Germanic personal name Abilo, followed by the suffix -o/-one, but this suffix does not usually accompany Germanic personal names. It has also been suggested that the name is based solely on the name ‘Abilo' with no suffix but the usage of a personal name with no suffix or epithet would be exceptional among Norman place names.

A third theory suggests that Ablon comes from the Germanic personal name Abbo followed by the suffix -lon. If this is the case the name of the town means “Abbo's wood”.

The similarity with the nearby village of Ablon-sur-Seine is coincidental.

== History ==
In 1809, Ablon grew in size following its union with two neighbouring communes: Crémanville and Ableville.

Ablon was the site of a Nobel dynamite factory from 1879 until 1989. The factory ceased operations following an explosion on 3 March 1988 which killed 5, including the factory's director, and left 8 injured. Windows were broken more than a kilometre away in the village of Honfleur.

== Administration ==
List of Successive Mayors of Ablon

From	To	Name	Party
2001	2008	Christian Trocque	UMP
2008	Current	Xavier Canu	DVD

== Population ==
The inhabitants of the commune are known as Ablonnais or Ablonnaises in French.

Historical population

Year	Pop.	±% p.a.
1793	324	—
1800	259	−3.15%
1806	332	+4.23%
1821	982	+7.50%
1831	901	−0.86%
1836	738	−3.91%
1841	702	−1.00%
1846	702	+0.00%
1851	721	+0.54%
1856	660	−1.75%
1861	719	+1.73%
1866	660	−1.70%
1872	638	−0.56%
1876	628	−0.39%
1881	650	+0.69%
1886	660	+0.31%
1891	740	+2.31%
1896	757	+0.46%
1901	803	+1.19%

Year	Pop.	±% p.a.
1906	741	−1.59%
1911	760	+0.51%
1921	728	−0.43%
1926	772	+1.18%
1931	741	−0.82%
1936	775	+0.90%
1946	841	+0.82%
1954	813	−0.42%
1962	852	+0.59%
1968	866	+0.27%
1975	838	−0.47%
1982	880	+0.70%
1990	940	+0.83%
1999	1,047	+1.21%
2007	1,160	+1.29%
2012	1,204	+0.75%
2017	1,204	+0.00%
2023	1,166	−0.53%

Source: EHESS (1793-1999) and INSEE

== Culture and heritage ==
=== Civil heritage ===
The commune has two buildings that are registered as historical monuments:

- The Chateau of Ablon (1767 and 1845)
- The Dynamite Factory (1885 to 1916). The factory contains several items that are registered as historical objects:
  - A Dreiswerke moulding machine (1952)
  - A Weighing machine (20th century)
  - A Nitroglycerine production line (20th century)

Other sites of interest

- La Houssaye Manor-farm

=== Religious heritage ===
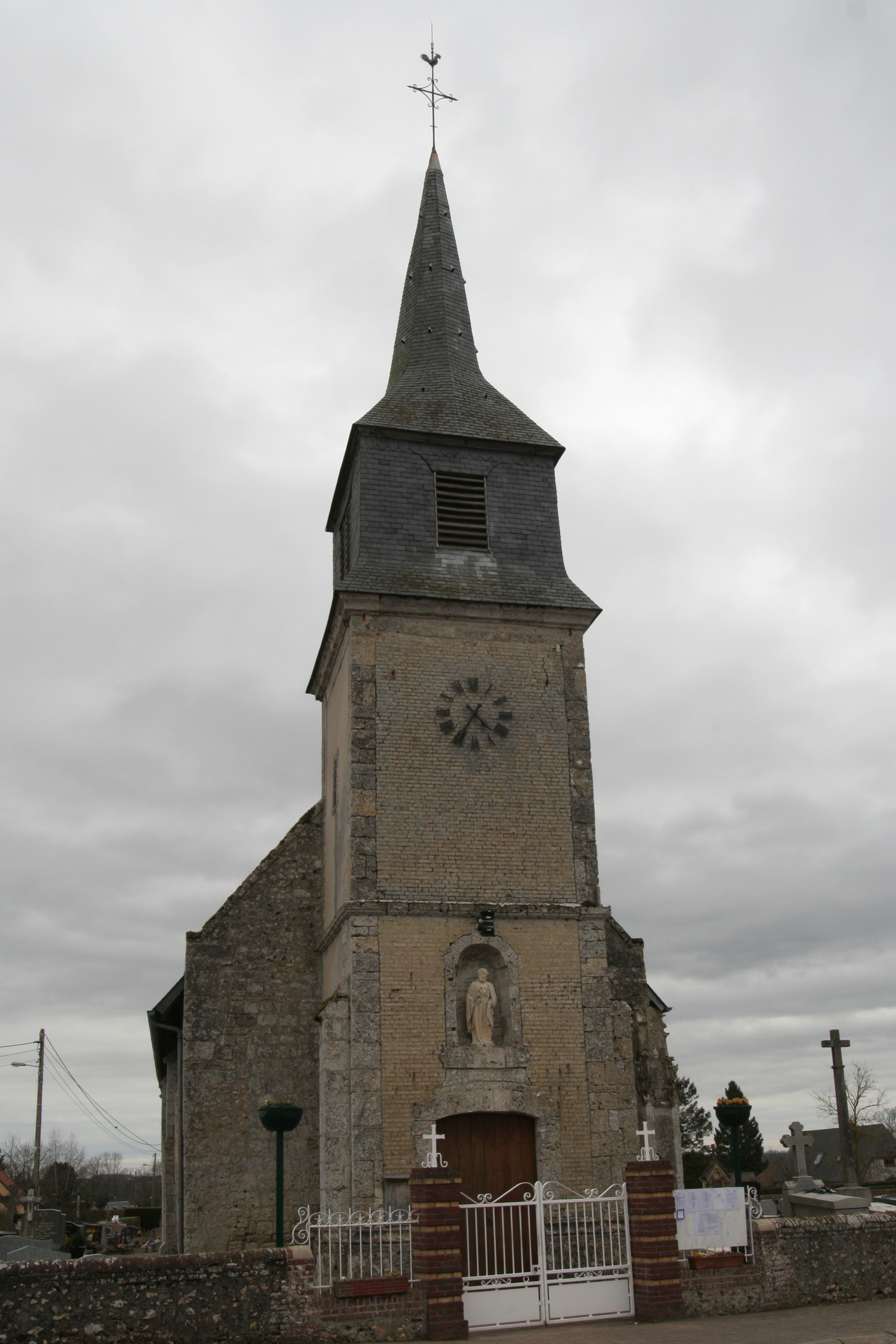
The Church of Saint-Pierre

The Parish Church of Saint-Pierre contains one item that is registered as an historical object:

- A Baptismal font (12th century)

== See also ==
- Communes of the Calvados department
