= Barneville-la-Bertran =

- Commune
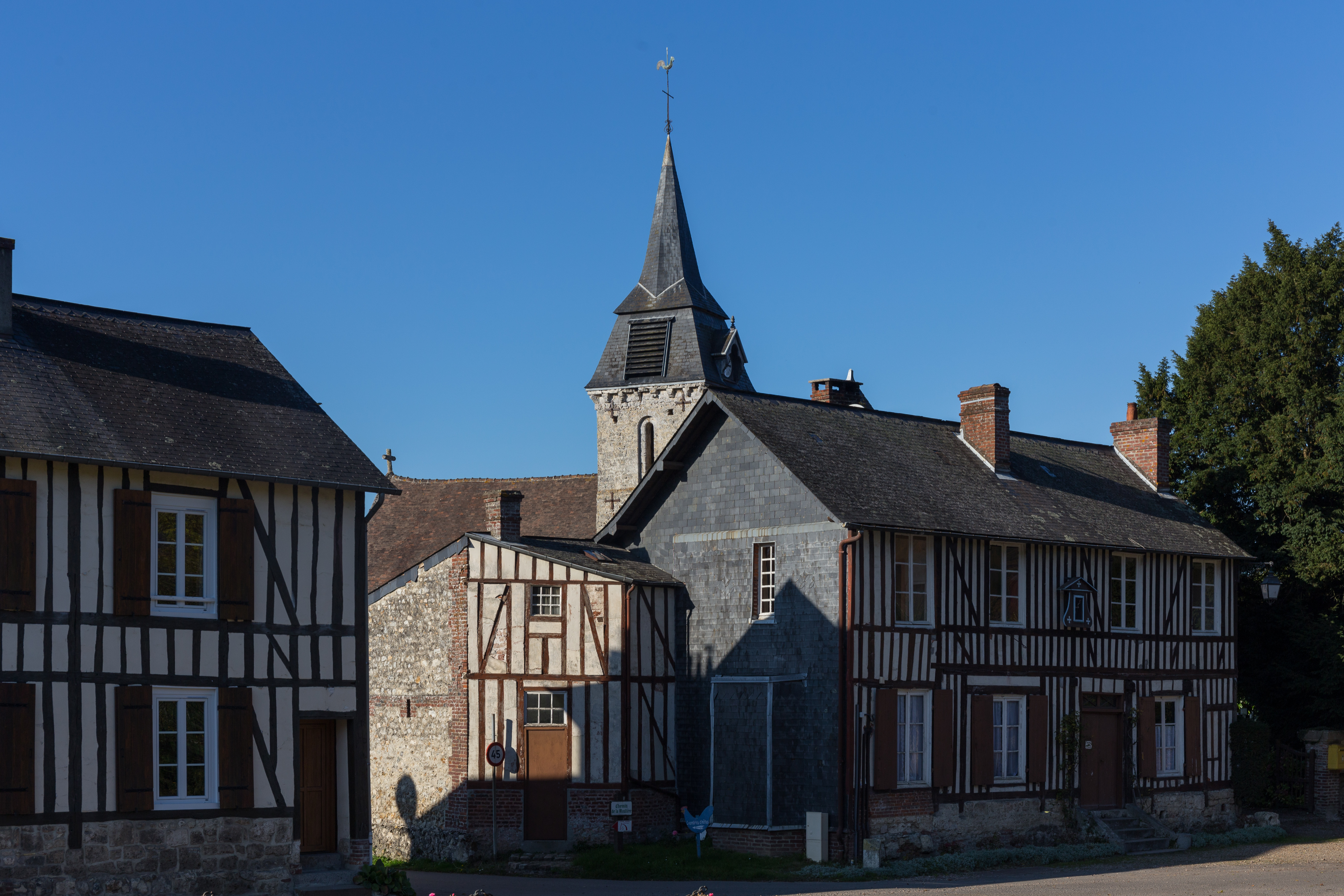
- The centre of Barneville-la-Bertran
- Location of Barneville-la-Bertran
- Location within France Location within Normandy
- Coordinates: 49°23′21″N 0°11′19″E
- Country: France
- Region: Normandy
- Department: Calvados
- Arrondissement: Lisieux
- Canton: Honfleur-Deauville
- Intercommunality: Pays de Honfleur-Beuzeville

Government
  - Mayor (2020–2026): Jean-François Bernard
- Area^{1}: 4.18 km^{2} (1.61 sq mi)
- Elevation: 40 m (130 ft)
- Highest elevation: 127 m (417 ft)
- Lowest elevation: 15 m (49 ft)
- Population (2023): 121
  - Density: 28.9/km^{2} (75.0/sq mi)
- Time zone: UTC+01:00 (CET)
  - Summer (DST): UTC+02:00 (CEST)
- INSEE/Postal code: 14041 /14600
- ^{1} French Land Register data, which excludes lakes, ponds, glaciers > 1 km^{2} (0.386 sq mi or 247 acres) and river estuaries.

Barneville-la-Bertran (before 1995: Barneville) is a commune in the Calvados department in the Normandy region of north-western France.

The inhabitants of the commune are known as Barnevillais or Barnevillaises.

== Geography ==
Barneville-la-Bertran is located north of the Pays d'Auge some 6 km south-west of Honfleur, 15 km south by south-east of Le Havre (across the Seine Estuary) and 10 km north-east of Deauville. Access to the commune is by the D62 from Pennedepie in the north which passes through the north of the commune and continues east to Équemauville. The D279 branches from the D288 south of the commune - just east of Deauville – Normandie Airport - and passes north through the village and joins the D62 just east of the commune. The commune is mostly farmland.

== Toponymy ==
Barneville was called Barnavilla in 1062: from the Scandinavian antroponym Biarn or Barni and the Latin villa giving the meaning "rural domain". Bertran is the family name of the lords of the area in the Middle Ages.

On 6 November 1995 the commune of Barneville officially changed its name to Barneville-la-Bertran.

== History ==
Barneville-la-Bertran appears as Barneville-la-Bertrand on the 1750 Cassini Map and as Barneville on the 1790 version.

== Administration ==
List of Successive Mayors

From	To	Name
1790	1792	Léonard Joseph Chauffer de Barneville
1792	1795	François Trembley
1800	1811	Pierre Charles Coulon
1811	1830	Alexandre Naguet de Saint-Georges
1830	1840	Jean Charles Casimir Langin
1840	1846	Jean Pierre Canterel
1846	1848	Jean Jacques Lebey
1848	1849	Elie Paumier
1849	1855	Jean Jacques Lebey
1850	1883	Amand Constant Rufin
1995	2001	Jean Pierre Aubert
2001	2026	Jean-François Bernard

The municipal council is made up of 11 members including the Mayor and two deputies.

== Demography ==
Historical population

Year	Pop.	±% p.a.
1793	236	—
1821	301	+0.87%
1846	279	−0.30%
1872	242	−0.55%
1901	223	−0.28%
1926	197	−0.49%
1936	187	−0.52%
1946	156	−1.80%
1954	174	+1.37%
1962	128	−3.77%

Year	Pop.	±% p.a.
1968	150	+2.68%
1975	131	−1.92%
1982	125	−0.67%
1990	124	−0.10%
1999	138	+1.20%
2007	143	+0.45%
2012	134	−1.29%
2017	127	−1.07%
2023	121	−0.80%

Source: EHESS and INSEE

== Culture and heritage ==
=== Civil heritage ===
The commune has two buildings and sites that are registered as historical monuments:

- The Manoir des Vallées (12th century)
- The Chateau of Barneville Park (1873)

=== Religious heritage ===
- The Church of Saint John the Baptist is flanked by a quadrangular tower and is registered as an historical monument.

== Notable people linked to the commune ==
- Jean Doublet (1655 - 1728 at Barneville), pirate.
- Marie-Catherine d'Aulnoy (1651 at Barneville - 1705), French writer of fairy tales.
- Françoise Sagan (1935-2004), writer, lived in the Breuil Manor before Lucien and Sacha Guitry. Died in hospital at Équemauville on 24 September 2004. Her body remained in her manor before being buried in Lot where she was born.

== See also ==
- Communes of the Calvados department
