= Canton of Honfleur-Deauville =

Coordinates: 49.42°N 0.23°E

- Canton
- Situation of the canton of Honfleur-Deauville in the department of Calvados
- Country: France
- Region: Normandy
- Department: Calvados
- No. of communes: {{{nbcomm}}}
- Population (2023): 29,315
- INSEE code: 1415

The canton of Honfleur-Deauville is an administrative division of the Calvados department, northwestern France. It was created at the French canton reorganisation which came into effect in March 2015. Its seat is in Honfleur.

It consists of the following communes:

1. Ablon
2. Barneville-la-Bertran
3. Cricquebœuf
4. Deauville
5. Équemauville
6. Fourneville
7. Genneville
8. Gonneville-sur-Honfleur
9. Honfleur
10. Pennedepie
11. Quetteville
12. La Rivière-Saint-Sauveur
13. Saint-Gatien-des-Bois
14. Le Theil-en-Auge
15. Touques
16. Trouville-sur-Mer
17. Villerville
