= Samuel Wide =

Swedish historian and archaeologist

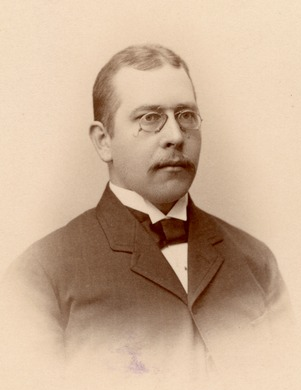
Samuel Wide (1892)

Samuel (Sam) Karl Anders Wide (c. 1861 – 13 February 1918) was a Swedish classical archaeologist, ancient historian and philologist.

== Biography ==
Wide was born at Stora Tuna in Kopparberg County, Sweden. Wide became a student at Uppsala University in 1879. In 1888 he received his PhD in Greek language and literature from Uppsala University.

In 1895 he became a professor of classical languages at the University of Lund, attaining a similar position at Uppsala in 1899. In 1909 he became the first professor of classical archaeology and ancient history at the University of Uppsala.

Wide made many study and research trips to the countries of classical culture. In 1893–95, he travelled extensively throughout Italy and Greece. In the summer of 1894, with Lennart Kjellberg (1857 –1936) he performed excavatory work of the Sanctuary of Poseidon on the island of Kalaureia. This was considered to be the first Swedish archaeological excavation in Greece. Later the same year, he conducted an excavation at Aphidna in Attica.

In 1889, Wide received the Swedish Academy minor prize for a study of Euripides and was a member of the Humanities Science Society in Uppsala (1900) and the Swedish Academy of Sciences (1915). He died during 1918 at Uppsala.

== Published works ==
- De sacris Troezeniorum, Hermionensium, Epidauriorum, Uppsala 1888 (dissertation).
- Lakonische Kulte, Leipzig 1893 – Laconian cult.
- Altgriechische Vase im Nationalmuseum zu Stockholm, in: Jahrbuch des Kaiserlich Deutschen Archäologischen Instituts. Band XII. 1897, Berlin: Georg Reimer, 1898; S. 195–199 – Ancient Greek vase in the National Museum of Stockholm.
- Geometrische Vasen aus Griechenland, in: Jahrbuch des Kaiserlich Deutschen Archäologischen Instituts. Band XIV. 1899. Berlin: Georg Reimer, 1900; S. 26–43, 78–86 und 188–215 – Geometric vases of Greece.
- Geometrische Vasen aus Griechenland (Schluß), in: Jahrbuch des Kaiserlich Deutschen Archäologischen Instituts. Band XV. 1900. Berlin: Georg Reimer, 1901, S. 49–58.
- Mykenische Götterbilder und Idole, in: Mitteilungen des Kaiserlich Deutschen Archäologischen Instituts. Athenische Abteilung. Band XXVI. 1901 – Mycenaean god-images and idols.
- Griechische und römische Religion, Leipzig 1910, 1912, 1922, 1931 in Gercke-Norden, Einleitung in die Altertumswissenschaft – Greek and Roman religion.
