= Gatianus of Tours =

3rd-century founding bishop of Tours

Saint Gatianus of Tours
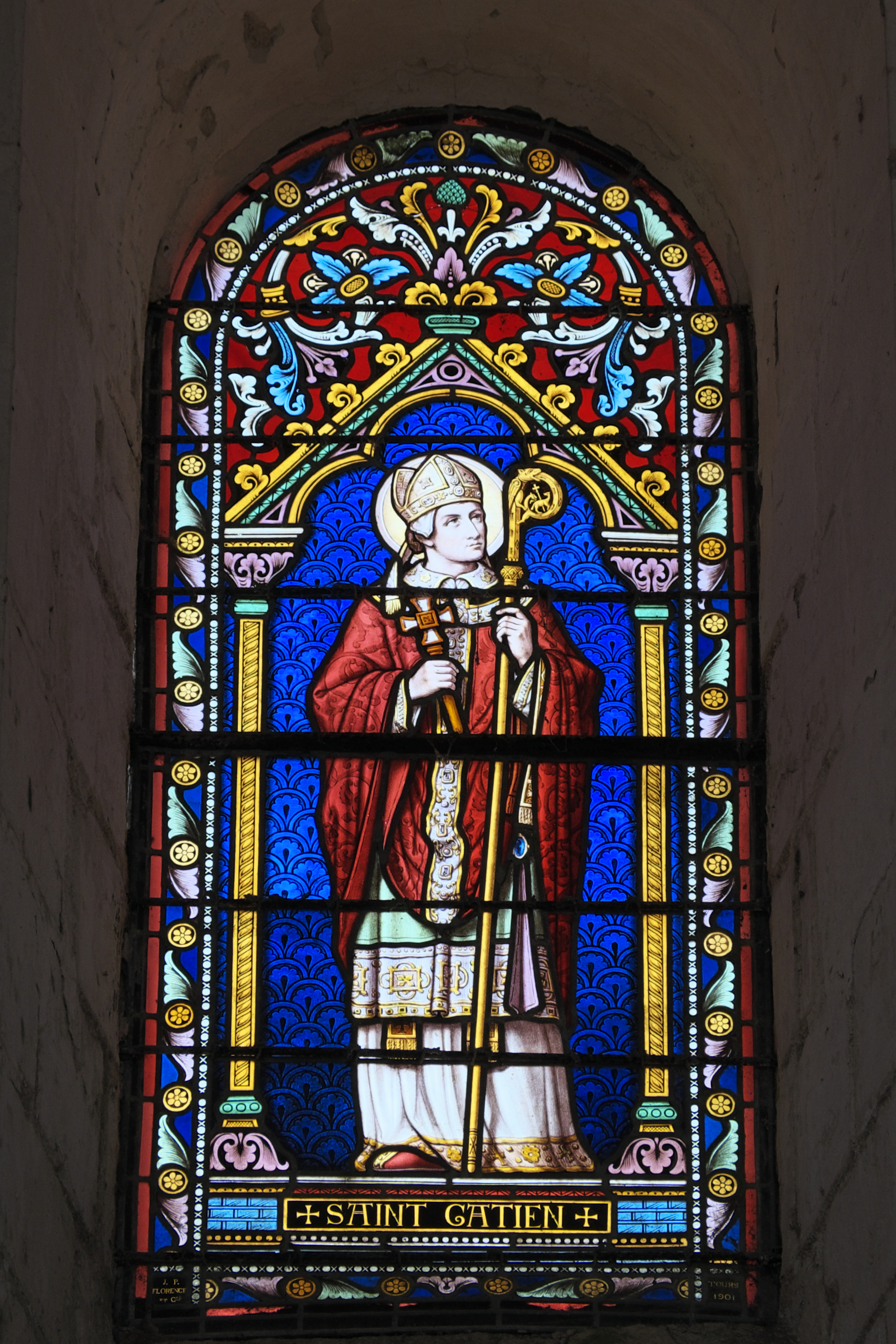
- St. Gatianus depicted in a stained-glass window, Église Notre-Dame (La Celle-Guenand)
- Born: third century
- Died: late third century
- Venerated in: Roman Catholic Church; Eastern Orthodox Church
- Feast: 18 December
- Patronage: Tours

Gatianus (Catianus, Gatianus, Gratianus; French: Cassien, Gatien, Gratien) in the third century AD was the founding bishop of the see of Tours. He was one of the "seven apostles of Gaul" commissioned by Pope Fabian to evangelize in the region.

== Life ==
According to Christian historians, during the consulship of the Emperor Decius and Vettius Gratus (250 AD), Pope Fabian sent out seven bishops from Rome to Gaul to preach the Gospel: Gatianus to Tours, Trophimus to Arles, Paul to Narbonne, Saturnin to Toulouse, Denis to Paris, Austromoine to Clermont, and Martial to Limoges. A community of Christians had already existed for many years in Lyon, where Irenaeus had been bishop.

As with other founders of the seven Catholic churches of Gaul, especially Martial, Gatianus became confounded in later Christian mythology with the "seventy-two disciples of Christ", alleged to have been sent into Gaul during the first century, by Peter himself. Other details of his biography, while not as easily disprovable, are also largely legendary. Gregory of Tours, writing in the 6th century, is a more dependable source for the few biographical details concerning his predecessor. According to the Catholic historian Louis Duchesne (Christian Worship: Its Origin and Evolution), the traditions preserved at Tours furnished Gregory with only the name of Gatianus and perhaps the 50-year extent of his episcopacy; it was by comparison with a brief early biography of Saturninus of Toulouse (Passio S. Saturnini) that Gregory arrived at the date 250 for the beginning of Gatianus' ministry at Tours (History of the Franks, 1.30).

There were few Christians in Tours at that time, and in one of the troubled years of his episcopate he is said for a time to have lain concealed in a cave on the banks of the Loire, at a spot where later rose the great Abbey of Marmoutier, and Gregory states that Gratianus would go into the city only when opportunities of preaching presented themselves. He devoted half a century to evangelization, amid innumerable difficulties, and at his death the diocese of Tours was securely established.

In a part of the empire where Mithraism was a dominating force among the legions, Léon Jaud reports that Gatianus likewise retreated into a grotto and there celebrated a mystical banquet (célébrait les saints mystères), but that of Christianity. Gatianus was often portrayed officiating at a ceremony in a cavern-like setting. Two grottos cut into the limestone hill above the river Loire, across from Tours at the largely demolished Marmoutier Abbey, are designated the first sites where Gatianus celebrated the liturgy. Anglophile Henry James toured the grottos of Gatianus:

The abbey of Marmoutier, which sprung from the grottos in the cliff to which Saint Gatianus and Saint Martin retired to pray, was therefore the creation of the latter worthy. ...The cliff is still there, and a winding staircase, in the latest taste, enables you conveniently to explore its recesses. These sacred niches are scooped out of the rock, and will give you an impression if you cannot do without one. ...They have been dealt with as the Catholic church deals with most of such places today; polished and furnished up; labelled and ticketed; edited, with notes, in short, like an old book. The process is a mistake. The early editions had more sanctity ... but there was nevertheless a great sweetness in the scene. The afternoon was lovely, and it was flushing to a close. The large garden stretched beneath us, blooming with fruit and wine and succulent vegetables, and beyond it flowed the shining river. The air was still, the shadows were long, and the place, after all, was full of memories, most of which might pass for virtuous.

Gatianus established a hospice for the poor outside the walls of Tours. There he lay, overcome with weariness, after five decades of fasting, penances and toil. There, Jaud describes Jesus appearing to Gatianus, saying, "Fear not! Thy crown is readied and the Saints await thy arrival in Heaven."

== Veneration ==
After Gatianus' death, during renewed persecution of Christians, the see of Tours remained unoccupied for 36 years. The Christians were dispersed and any direct connection with the historical Gatianus was irretrievably broken. Gregory records the second bishop as Litorius, traditionally credited with building the predecessor of the present cathedral in Tours, and states that he was bishop for 33 years until about the time Saint Martin arrived in Tours in 371 AD. However, Martin found few Christians in this city; local lore nevertheless kept the legend of Gatianus alive. Martin found Gatianus' burial site, and always venerated his predecessor. With the rise in importance of Paris, Gatianus came to be seen more and more as a disciple of Saint Denis, and is so described at many modern Catholic websites.

Tours became a major pilgrimage site, focused on the tomb of Saint Martin of Tours. The cathedral, originally consecrated to Saint Maurice, was reconsecrated to Saint Gatianus at its 13th century rebuilding. His relics were destroyed in 1793, during the French Revolution. Petty ambitions and little tragedies of mid-19th century provincial life, centered on the cathedral, are portrayed in Honoré de Balzac's Le Curé de Tours ("The curate of Tours").

Saint Gatianus' day is observed on 18 December.

Saint-Gatien-des-Bois is a commune in Lower Normandy (Calvados), France.

The golf course and the airport at Deauville, schools, and other institutions bear his name.

== See also ==
- Bishop of Tours
- Saint Gatianus of Tours, patron saint archive
