= Cricquebœuf =

- Commune
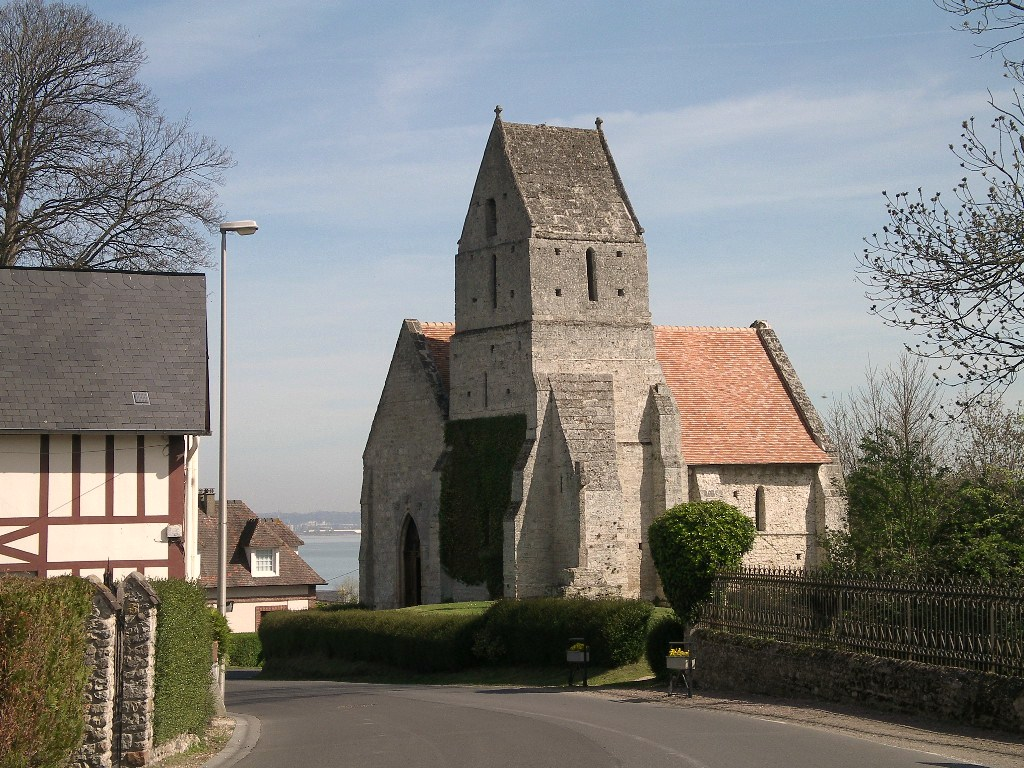
- The church in Cricquebœuf
- Location of Cricquebœuf
- Location within France Location within Normandy
- Coordinates: 49°24′11″N 0°08′48″E
- Country: France
- Region: Normandy
- Department: Calvados
- Arrondissement: Lisieux
- Canton: Honfleur-Deauville

Government
  - Mayor (2020–2026): Albert Depuis
- Area^{1}: 1.85 km^{2} (0.71 sq mi)
- Elevation: 24 m (79 ft)
- Highest elevation: 143 m (469 ft)
- Lowest elevation: 2 m (6.6 ft)
- Population (2023): 246
  - Density: 133/km^{2} (344/sq mi)
- Time zone: UTC+01:00 (CET)
  - Summer (DST): UTC+02:00 (CEST)
- INSEE/Postal code: 14202 /14113
- ^{1} French Land Register data, which excludes lakes, ponds, glaciers > 1 km^{2} (0.386 sq mi or 247 acres) and river estuaries.

Cricquebœuf (French pronunciation: [kʁikbœf]) is a commune in the Calvados department in the Normandy region in northwestern France.

== Population ==
Historical population
Year	Pop.	±% p.a.
1968	169	—
1975	130	−3.68%
1982	172	+4.08%
1990	186	+0.98%
1999	182	−0.24%
2007	205	+1.50%
2012	230	+2.33%
2017	293	+4.96%
2023	246	−2.87%
Source: INSEE

== See also ==
- Communes of the Calvados department
