= Ketil =

Ketil is a Norwegian masculine given name, and may refer to:

- Ketil Askildt (1900-1978), Norwegian discus thrower
- Ketil Bjørnstad (born 1952), Norwegian pianist
- Ketil Flatnose (9th century), Norwegian hersir
- Ketil Haugsand (21st century), Norwegian harpsichordist
- Ketil Lenning (born 1950), Norwegian businessperson
- Ketil Lund (born 1939), Norwegian judge
- Ketil Motzfeldt (1814-1889), Norwegian politician
- Ketil Skogen (1884-1970), Norwegian politician
- Ketil Solvik-Olsen (born 1972), Norwegian politician
- Ketil Stokkan (born 1956), Norwegian singer
- Ketil Thorkelsson (9th century), Norwegian hersir
- Lars Ketil Strand (born 1924), Norwegian forester
- Ketil (mountain)

== See also ==
- Kjetil
- Kjeld
- Kjell
