= Kettil =

Kettil is a given name. Notable people with the name include:

- Kettil Karlsson (Vasa) (1433–1465), Swedish clergyman and regent of Sweden under the Kalmar Union from February 1464 to August 1465
- Kettil Runske, according to Olaus Magnus's Historia de Gentibus Septentrionalibus (1555), the man who brought runes to humankind
- Kettil Trout, North Norwegian chieftain from Ramsta (Hrafnista) in Hålogaland, from Icelandic saga Kettil Hoeng or Ketils saga hœngs

== See also ==
- Kjetil
