= Gonneville-sur-Honfleur =

- Commune
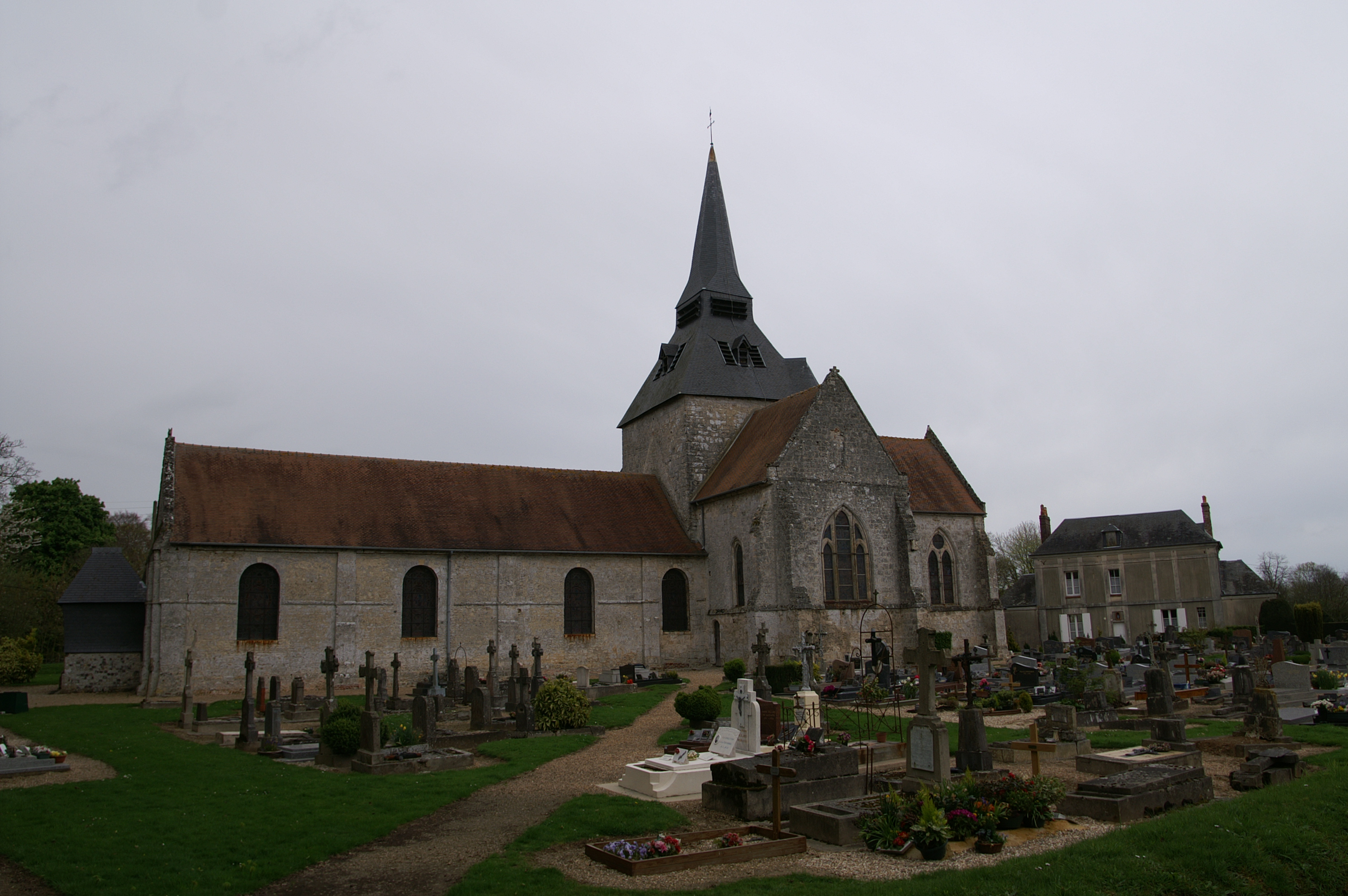
- The church in Gonneville-sur-Honfleur

- Coat of arms
- Location of Gonneville-sur-Honfleur
- Location within France Location within Normandy
- Coordinates: 49°23′04″N 0°14′42″E
- Country: France
- Region: Normandy
- Department: Calvados
- Arrondissement: Lisieux
- Canton: Honfleur-Deauville
- Intercommunality: Pays de Honfleur-Beuzeville

Government
  - Mayor (2020–2026): Christian Minot
- Area^{1}: 8.50 km^{2} (3.28 sq mi)
- Highest elevation: 129 m (423 ft)
- Lowest elevation: 34 m (112 ft)
- Population (2023): 859
  - Density: 101/km^{2} (262/sq mi)
- Time zone: UTC+01:00 (CET)
  - Summer (DST): UTC+02:00 (CEST)
- INSEE/Postal code: 14304 /14600
- ^{1} French Land Register data, which excludes lakes, ponds, glaciers > 1 km^{2} (0.386 sq mi or 247 acres) and river estuaries.

Gonneville-sur-Honfleur (French pronunciation: [ɡɔnvil syʁ ɔ̃flœʁ], literally Gonneville on Honfleur) is a commune in the Calvados department in the Normandy region in northwestern France.

== Population ==
Historical population
| Year | Pop. | ±% p.a. |
|---|---|---|
| 1968 | 524 | — |
| 1975 | 493 | −0.87% |
| 1982 | 552 | +1.63% |
| 1990 | 718 | +3.34% |
| 1999 | 723 | +0.08% |
| 2007 | 770 | +0.79% |
| 2012 | 835 | +1.63% |
| 2017 | 875 | +0.94% |
| 2023 | 859 | −0.31% |
Source: INSEE

== See also ==
- Communes of the Calvados department
