= Kell (given name) =

Kell is a given name.

== People with the given name ==
- Kell Areskoug (1906–1996), Swedish sprinter
- Kell Brook (born 1986), English professional boxer from Sheffield who fights in the welterweight division
- Kell Osborne (1939–2012), American singer best known as a member of The Primes, a group which would later be known as The Temptations

== Fictional characters ==
- Kell, a character in the online comic strip Kevin and Kell
- Kell, a Klingon ambassador in the Star Trek: The Next Generation episode "The Mind's Eye"
- Kell Maresh, one of the main characters in A Darker Shade of Magic by V.E. Schwab.
- Kell Tainer, a character in the Star Wars Expanded Universe

== See also ==
- Kjell
