= Ellen Kjellberg =

Norwegian dancer (born 1948)

Kåre Kolberg
- Born: 10 January 1948 (age 77); Oslo, Norway
- Occupation: Dancer
- Employer: Norwegian National Opera and Ballet
- Father: Reidar Kjellberg

Ellen Kjellberg (born 10 January 1948) is a Norwegian dancer. She was born in Oslo, a daughter of art historian and museologist Reidar Kjellberg. She was among the leading dancers at the Norwegian National Opera and Ballet in the 1960s and 1970s. A bronze sculpture of Kjellberg, modelled by Nina Sundbye in 1996, is located at the Norwegian National Opera and Ballet in Oslo. She was appointed Professor at the Oslo National Academy of the Arts from 2007.
