= Le Theil-en-Auge =

- Commune
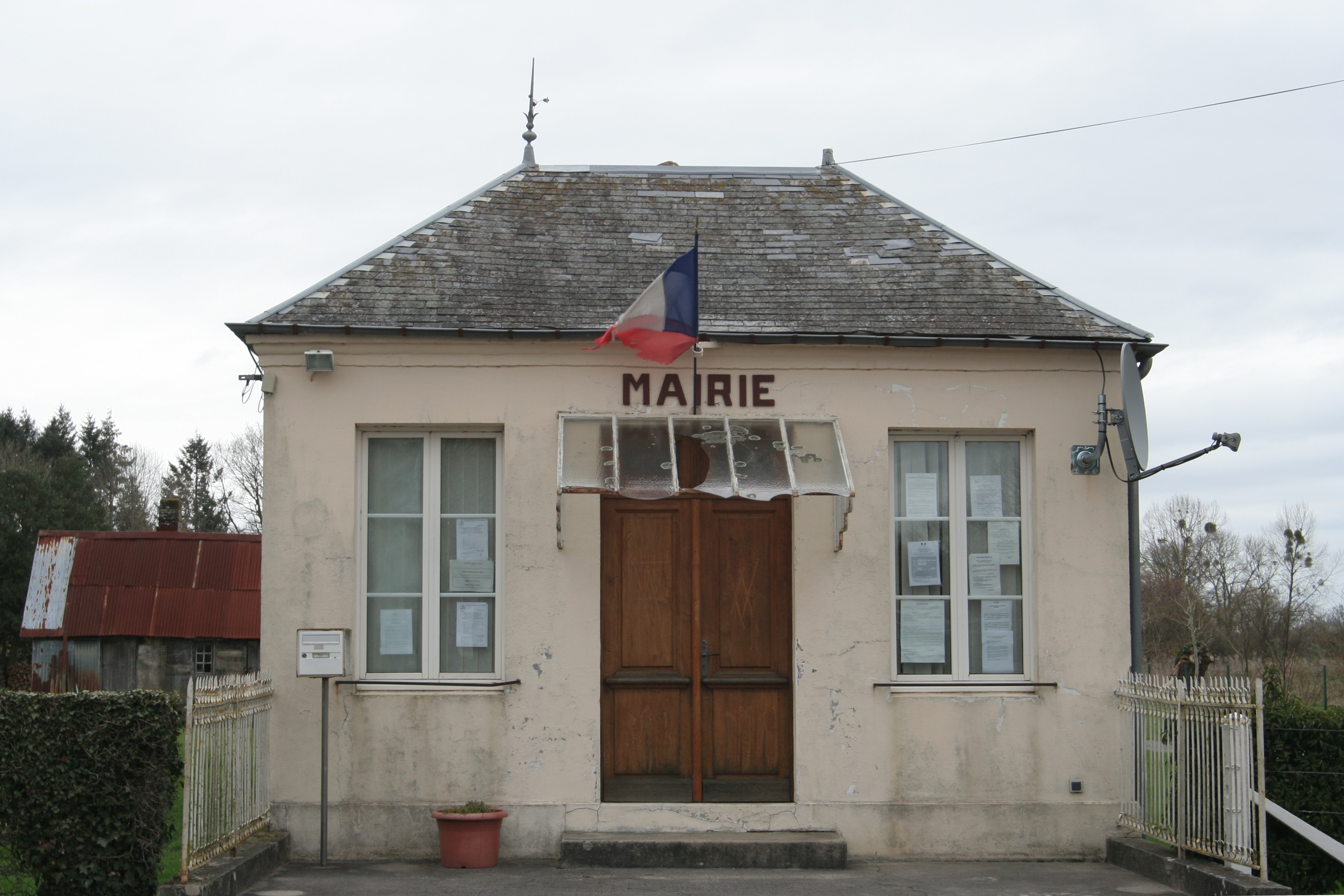
- The town hall in Le Theil-en-Auge
- Location of Le Theil-en-Auge
- Location within France Location within Normandy
- Coordinates: 49°20′54″N 0°14′56″E
- Country: France
- Region: Normandy
- Department: Calvados
- Arrondissement: Lisieux
- Canton: Honfleur-Deauville
- Intercommunality: Pays de Honfleur-Beuzeville

Government
  - Mayor (2020–2026): Didier Eudes
- Area^{1}: 2.78 km^{2} (1.07 sq mi)
- Elevation: 100 m (330 ft)
- Highest elevation: 142 m (466 ft)
- Lowest elevation: 94 m (308 ft)
- Population (2023): 199
  - Density: 71.6/km^{2} (185/sq mi)
- Time zone: UTC+01:00 (CET)
  - Summer (DST): UTC+02:00 (CEST)
- INSEE/Postal code: 14687 /14130
- ^{1} French Land Register data, which excludes lakes, ponds, glaciers > 1 km^{2} (0.386 sq mi or 247 acres) and river estuaries.

Le Theil-en-Auge (French pronunciation: [lə tɛj ɑ̃.n‿oʒ], literally Le Theil in Auge) is a commune in the Calvados department in the Normandy region in northwestern France.

== Population ==
Historical population
| Year | Pop. | ±% p.a. |
|---|---|---|
| 1968 | 128 | — |
| 1975 | 94 | −4.31% |
| 1982 | 92 | −0.31% |
| 1990 | 124 | +3.80% |
| 1999 | 159 | +2.80% |
| 2007 | 166 | +0.54% |
| 2012 | 179 | +1.52% |
| 2017 | 186 | +0.77% |
| 2023 | 199 | +1.13% |
Source: INSEE

== See also ==
- Communes of the Calvados department
