= L-groups =

Resistance group

L-group L-gruppe
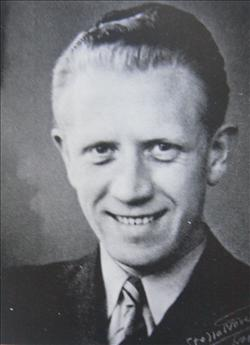
- Leader of L-group North Einar Sørensen
- Leaders: Einar Sørensen; Henrik Wessel Platou
- Dates active: 1940 - 1945
- Groups: North, South, Central
- Headquarters: Aarhus, Denmark
- Active regions: Jutland
- Size: c. 10
- Part of: Danish resistance movement
- Wars: Second World War

The L-groups (Danish: L-gruppe) was a resistance group tasked with assassination of Danish collaborators and German forces occupying Denmark during the Second World War. The precursor to the group was established in 1940, but it was most active from 1944 to the end of the war. The group carried out at least 18 assassination operations and killed between 20 and 30 people. In 1945 the group was hard hit by arrests and killings of its members and further suffered a very high death-rate in the years immediately after the war with suicides and accidents killing a number of members. The group had strong ties to the Danish police, with 5 of its members being police officers.

== History ==
The L-groups can be traced back to Hans Krarup Andreasen from Silkeborg, one of the earliest recorded Danish resistance members. Working on his own, Krarup conducted sporadic sabotage against German authorities in 1940; over the following years, his brothers Niels and Ulrik joined him. The group worked primarily on railway sabotage in and around Silkeborg. In the spring of 1944, Krarup contacted the resistance movement in Aarhus. The Aarhus groups counted among them two police officers: Einar Sørensen and Henrik Platou, who had shot the informant Karl Vilhelm Gustav Jeger in Aarhus in January 1944, and it was agreed to form a dedicated assassination group with them as the backbone.

The L-groups was officially formed over the summer of 1944, and in August the first assassinations occurred. On 4 October 1944, the Special Operations Executive agent Kjeld Toft-Christensen arrived from England and joined the group as a liaison officer and trainer. In the fall of 1944 the group was divided in two, with Einar Sørensen and Henrik Platou taking control of one each. Platou's group was based in Aalborg and was to cover central and southern Jutland, while Sørensen's was based in Aarhus with northern Jutland as its operational area. The two groups were to subsequently recruit reliable locals within their areas and expand. L-group North initially comprised Hans Krarup Andreasen, Svend Ulrich Pedersen and Vagn Nørlund Christensen with Platou as group leader. Sigurd Vestergaard Christensen, Jørgen Christian Jensen, Kjeld Toft-Christensen and Carl Johan Nielsen formed L-group Central, with Sørensen as leader.

The groups settled into their new roles, and through 1944, performed a total of 10 operations against 10 targets. However, in early 1945, L-group North was destroyed. On 27 January Svend Ulrich Pedersen was killed on his 22nd birthday by the Gestapo during a shoot-out which also cost the lives of two Gestapo members. One month later, on 14 February, Platou was wounded during an assassination attempt leading to his later arrest on 21 February and execution in March. On 21 February, the Gestapo also raided the residence of Vagn Nørlund Christensen and Krarup Andreasen; while Andreasen was discovered and committed suicide by shooting himself, Nørlund escaped through a bay window in the roof. Nørlund was subsequently sent to Vejle to start a new group, L-group South, with Svend Middelboe Jensen, to cover southern Jutland.

Of the ten original members of the L-group, four were killed during the war and another two committed suicide in the months following it; only one is known to have survived the decade after the war.

== Members ==
Name	Occupation	Codename	Group	Born	Died	Cause
Hans Krarup Andreasen	Lumberjack	"Mogens"	North	13 September 1913	21 February 1945 (aged 31)	Suicide during arrest
Henrik Platou	Police officer	"Knud"	North	31 January 1918	10 March 1945 (aged 27)	Executed
Svend Ulrich Pedersen	Machinist	"Kjeld"	North	27 January 1923	27 January 1945 (aged 22)	Killed
Vagn Nørlund Christensen	Police officer	"Anker"	North, South	c. 1913	-	-
Jørgen Christian Jensen	Police officer	"H.C."	Central	18 July 1901	8 May 1945 (aged 43)	Killed
Einar Sørensen	Police officer	"Leif"	Central	6 February 1914	1 September 1945 (aged 31)	Suicide
Kjeld Toft-Christensen	Special Operations Executive	"Dahl"	Central	19 June 1910	27 September 1945 (aged 35)	Suicide
Sigurd Vestergaard Christensen	Politician	"Ole"	Central	17 August 1910	30 July 1945 (aged 34)	Car accident
Carl Johan Nielsen	Merchant	"Johan med røven"	Central	25 July 1909	24 December 1981 (aged 72)	Natural causes
Svend Middelboe Jensen	Police officer		South	15 May 1908	2 November 1953 (aged 45)	Suicide

== Operations ==
=== 1944 ===
- Karl Vilhelm Gustav Jeger, shot on 18 January in Aarhus by Einar Sørensen.
- Peder Ole Pedersen Sandhøj, shot on 12 August in Aarhus by Hans Peter Krarup Andreasen.
- Gunnar Siim, shot on 29 August in Silkeborg by Einar Sørensen.
- Svend Aage Næsted Nielsen, killed by letter bomb on 13 September in Skanderborg by Einar Sørensen.
- Ernst Laurits Mikkelsen, shot on 5 October in Ålborg by Einar Sørensen.
- Landry Arnfeldt Nielsen, shot on 18 October in Randers by Henrik Wessel Platou.
- Svend Meulengracht Larsen, shot on 6 November in Silkeborg by Vagn Nørlund Christensen.
- Olaf Sørensen Schmidt, shot on 13 November in Aarhus by Einar Sørensen.
- Johannes Marinus Foged Jørgensen, shot on 15 December in Aarhus by Einar Sørensen.
- Niels Egon Bekker Christensen, shot on 31 December in Aarhus by Einar Sørensen.

=== 1945 ===
- Søren Rasmussen Skaade, shot on 14 January in Aarhus by Einar Sørensen.
- Christian Dahl, shot on 8 February in Aarhus by Sigurd Vestergaard Christensen.
- Oscar Willi Baggersgaard, shot on 21 February by Einar Sørensen.
- Preben Arne Bisp, shot on 28 March in Aarhus by Einar Sørensen.
- Knud Ørskou shot on 28 March in Aarhus by Einar Sørensen.
- Ursula Wartho, shot on 29 April in Vejle by Svend Middelboe.
- Olaf Christian Quist, shot along with 3 Gestapo officers on 29 April in Aarhus by Kjeld Toft-Christensen.
- Jørgen Hvid, shot 1 May in Vejle by Svend Middelboe.
