= La Rivière-Saint-Sauveur =

- Commune
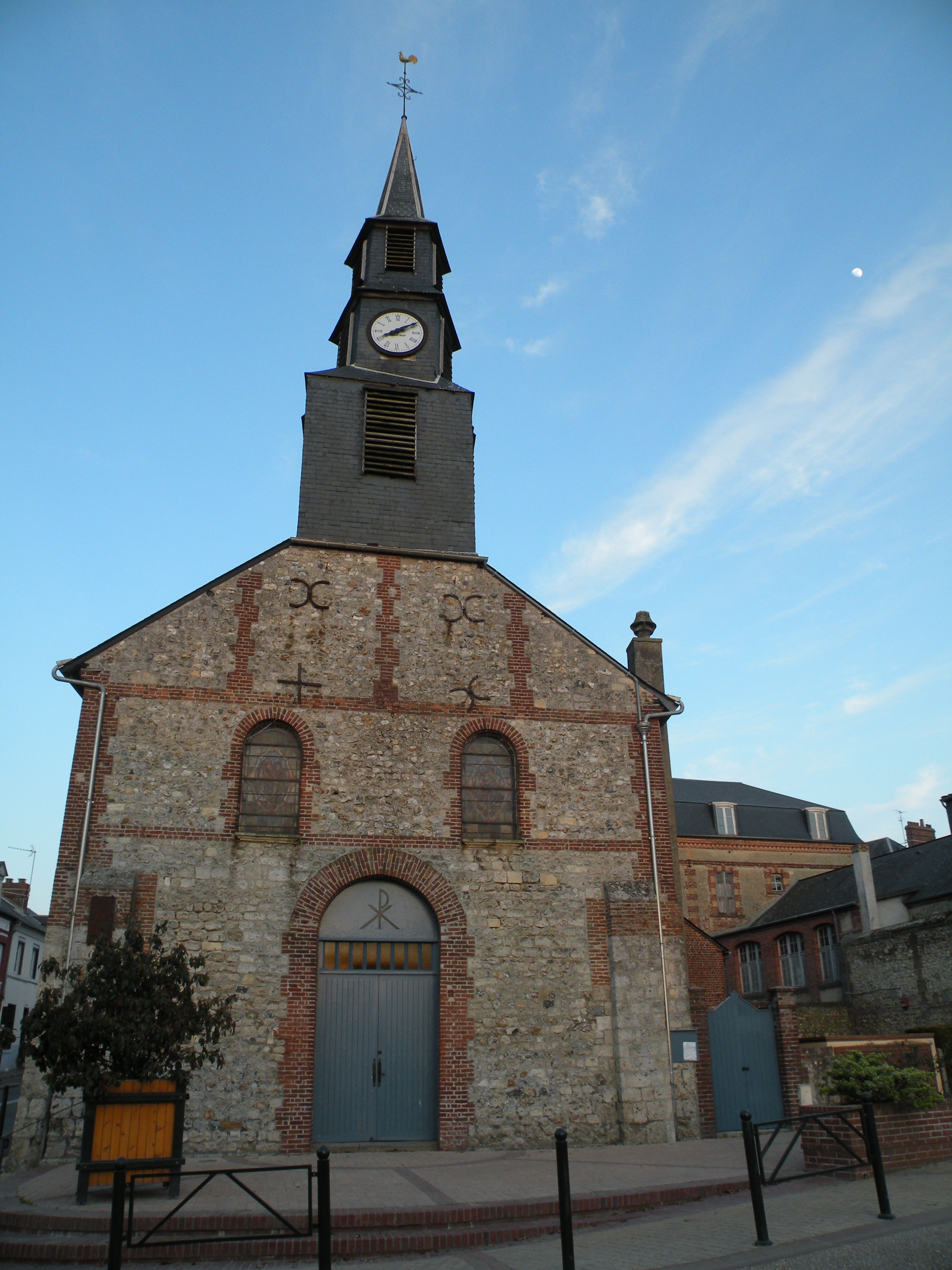
- The church in La Rivière-Saint-Sauveur

- Coat of arms
- Location of La Rivière-Saint-Sauveur
- Location within France Location within Normandy
- Coordinates: 49°24′29″N 0°16′20″E
- Country: France
- Region: Normandy
- Department: Calvados
- Arrondissement: Lisieux
- Canton: Honfleur-Deauville
- Intercommunality: Pays de Honfleur-Beuzeville

Government
  - Mayor (2020–2026): Didier Depirou
- Area^{1}: 5.39 km^{2} (2.08 sq mi)
- Elevation: 11 m (36 ft)
- Highest elevation: 108 m (354 ft)
- Lowest elevation: 0 m (0 ft)
- Population (2023): 2,527
  - Density: 469/km^{2} (1,210/sq mi)
- Time zone: UTC+01:00 (CET)
  - Summer (DST): UTC+02:00 (CEST)
- INSEE/Postal code: 14536 /14600
- ^{1} French Land Register data, which excludes lakes, ponds, glaciers > 1 km^{2} (0.386 sq mi or 247 acres) and river estuaries.

La Rivière-Saint-Sauveur (French pronunciation: [la ʁivjɛʁ sɛ̃ sovœʁ]) is a commune in the Calvados department and Normandy region of north-western France.

== Population ==
Historical population
Year	Pop.	±% p.a.
1968	1,363	—
1975	1,395	+0.33%
1982	1,515	+1.19%
1990	1,584	+0.56%
1999	1,578	−0.04%
2007	2,062	+3.40%
2012	2,234	+1.62%
2017	2,538	+2.58%
2023	2,527	−0.07%
Source: INSEE

== See also ==
- Communes of the Calvados department
