= Genneville =

- Commune
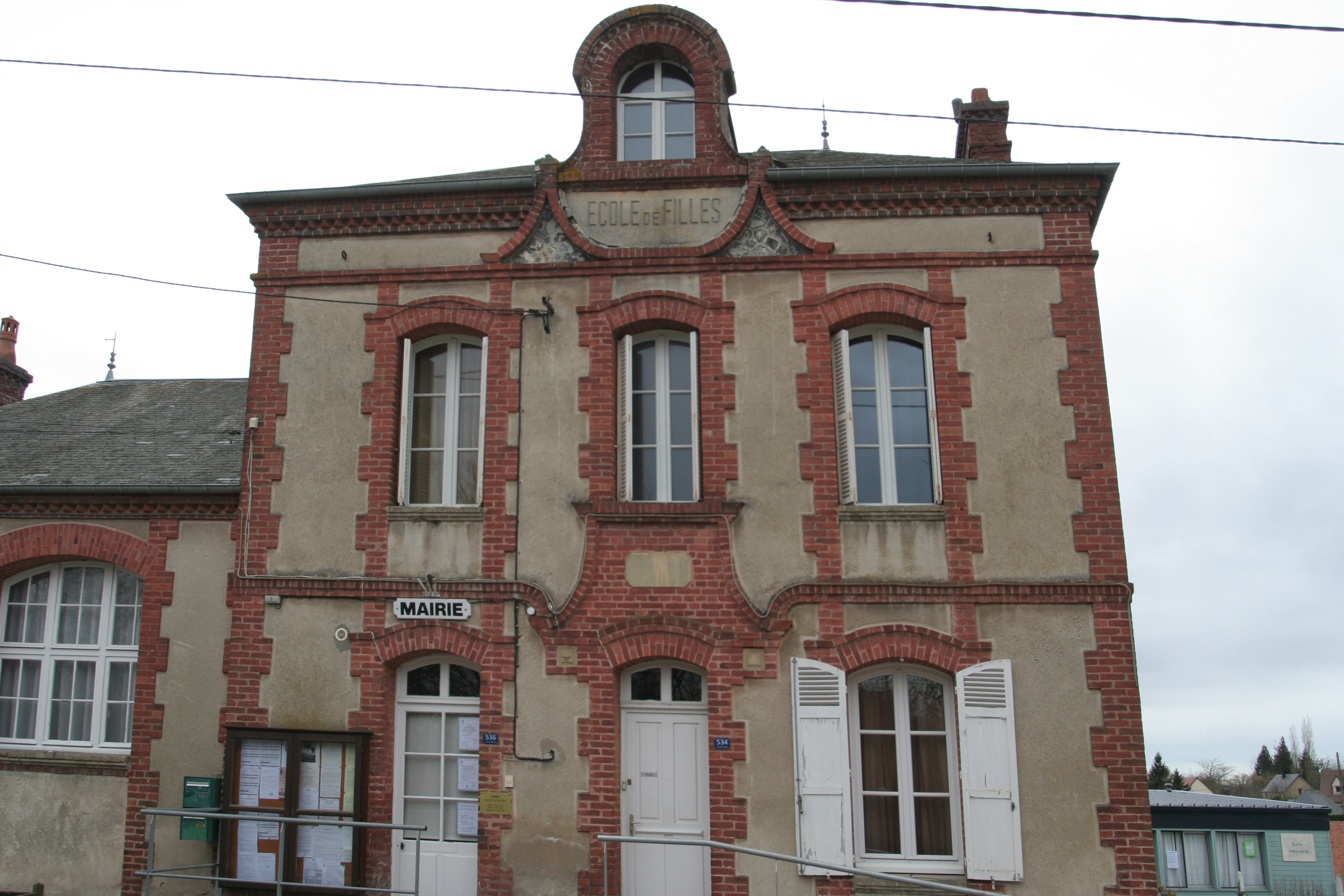
- The town hall in Genneville
- Location of Genneville
- Location within France Location within Normandy
- Coordinates: 49°22′14″N 0°16′32″E
- Country: France
- Region: Normandy
- Department: Calvados
- Arrondissement: Lisieux
- Canton: Honfleur-Deauville

Government
  - Mayor (2020–2026): Moïse Andrieu
- Area^{1}: 9.36 km^{2} (3.61 sq mi)
- Elevation: 87 m (285 ft)
- Highest elevation: 139 m (456 ft)
- Lowest elevation: 30 m (98 ft)
- Population (2023): 806
  - Density: 86.1/km^{2} (223/sq mi)
- Time zone: UTC+01:00 (CET)
  - Summer (DST): UTC+02:00 (CEST)
- INSEE/Postal code: 14299 /14600
- ^{1} French Land Register data, which excludes lakes, ponds, glaciers > 1 km^{2} (0.386 sq mi or 247 acres) and river estuaries.

Genneville (French pronunciation: [ʒɛnvil]) is a commune in the Calvados department in the Normandy region in northwestern France.

== Population ==
Historical population
Year	Pop.	±% p.a.
1968	334	—
1975	329	−0.22%
1982	468	+5.16%
1990	472	+0.11%
1999	597	+2.64%
2007	718	+2.33%
2012	779	+1.64%
2017	827	+1.20%
2023	806	−0.43%
Source: INSEE

== See also ==
- Communes of the Calvados department
