= Fourneville =

- Commune
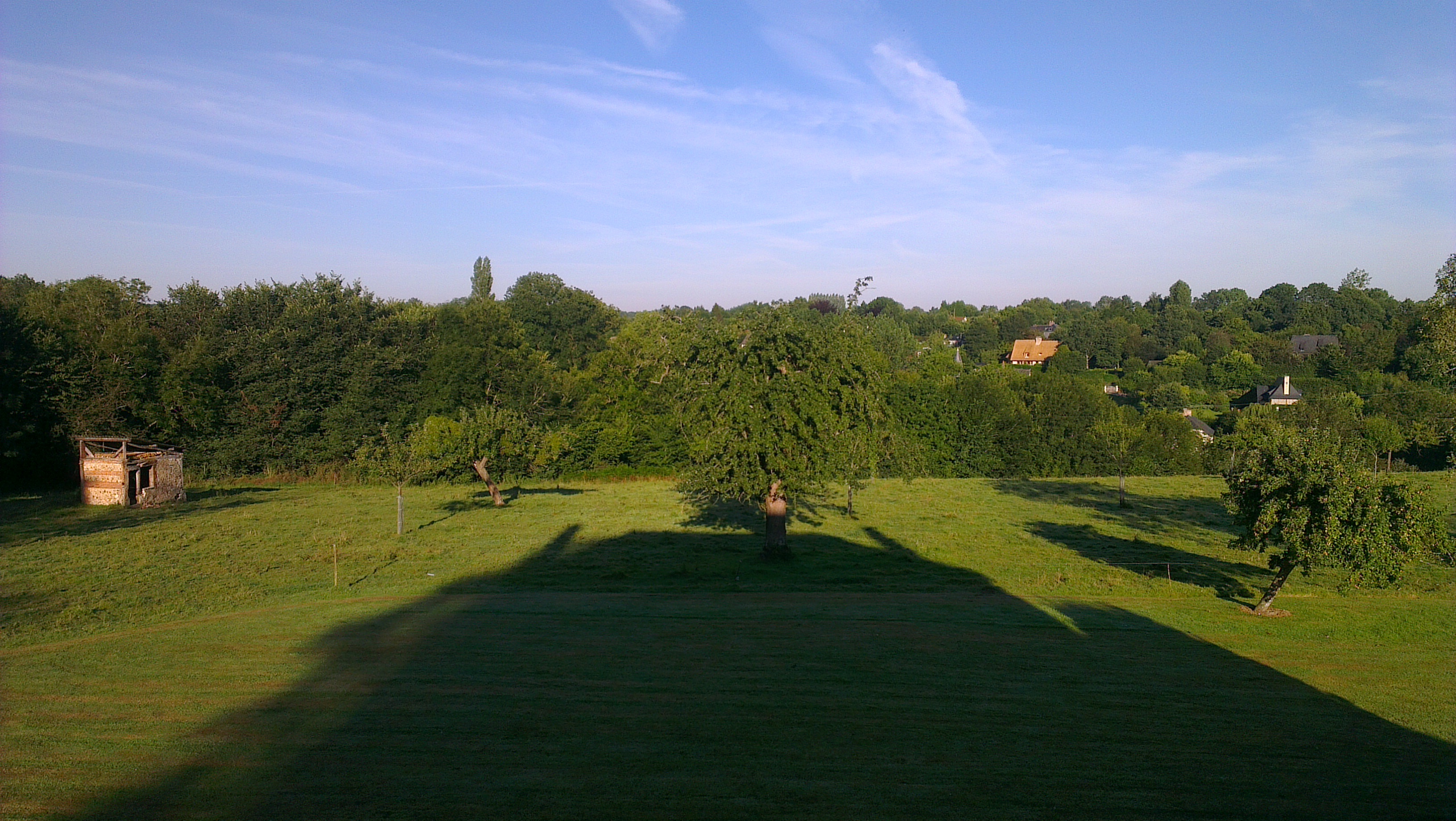
- The landscape of Fourneville
- Location of Fourneville
- Location within France Location within Normandy
- Coordinates: 49°21′28″N 0°14′09″E
- Country: France
- Region: Normandy
- Department: Calvados
- Arrondissement: Lisieux
- Canton: Honfleur-Deauville
- Intercommunality: Pays de Honfleur-Beuzeville

Government
  - Mayor (2020–2026): Jean-Marie Delamare
- Area^{1}: 6.86 km^{2} (2.65 sq mi)
- Highest elevation: 145 m (476 ft)
- Lowest elevation: 54 m (177 ft)
- Population (2023): 488
  - Density: 71.1/km^{2} (184/sq mi)
- Time zone: UTC+01:00 (CET)
  - Summer (DST): UTC+02:00 (CEST)
- INSEE/Postal code: 14286 /14600
- ^{1} French Land Register data, which excludes lakes, ponds, glaciers > 1 km^{2} (0.386 sq mi or 247 acres) and river estuaries.

Fourneville (French pronunciation: [fuʁnəvil]) is a commune in the Calvados department in the Normandy region in northwestern France.

== Population ==
Historical population
Year	Pop.	±% p.a.
1968	264	—
1975	238	−1.47%
1982	291	+2.91%
1990	343	+2.08%
1999	351	+0.26%
2007	470	+3.72%
2012	495	+1.04%
2017	495	+0.00%
2023	488	−0.24%
Source: INSEE

== See also ==
- Communes of the Calvados department
