= Kjeld Stub (1868–1955) =

Norwegian priest, politician (1868–1955)

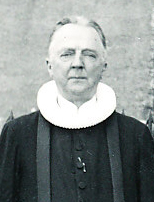
Kjeld Stub

Kjeld F. K. Stub (16 February 1868 – 6 January 1955) was a Norwegian priest and politician.

Kjeld Fredrik Karl Stub was born at Sigdal in Buskerud, Norway. He took the cand.theol. degree in 1892. He worked as a secretary for the YMCA in Kristiania and curate for the dean in the Diocese of Kristiania Gustav Jensen (1845–1922). In 1912, he was hired as the priest at Garnisonskirken in Oslo (1899-1901) and of the garrison Akershus Fortress, where he remained until his retirement in 1938. He was also a chairman of the Norwegian Sunday School Association, and board member of the Norwegian Lutheran Inner Mission Society (Det norske lutherske Indremisjonsselskap), the children's home Toftes gave and the society against cruelty to animals, Foreningen til Dyrenes Beskyttelse.

Stub represented the Conservative Party in the city council. In 1933 he joined the new party Nasjonal Samling and was a failed candidate in the 1933 Norwegian parliamentary election, where he occupied the last ballot spot. In the 1936 Norwegian parliamentary election he tried again, this time as the fourth candidate on the ballot behind Vidkun Quisling, H. Knutsen and Øyvor Hansson.

He died in 1955 and was buried at Vår Frelsers gravlund.
