= Kjell Johansson =

Kjell Johansson may refer to:

- Kjell Johansson (referee) (active 1978–1982), Swedish football referee
- Kjell Johansson (table tennis) (1946–2011), Swedish table tennis player
- Kjell Johansson (tennis) (born 1951), Swedish tennis player
