= Johannes Boehlau =

German classical archaeologist

Johannes Boehlau (30 September 1861, Halle an der Saale – 24 September 1941, Göttingen) was a German classical archaeologist.

In 1884 he received his doctorate from the University of Rostock with the dissertation thesis, Quaestiones de re vestiaria Graecorum. This was followed by a study trip to Asia Minor and Greece (1885/86) that was made possible from a travel grant by the German Institute of Archaeology (DAI). From 1902 to 1928 he was director of the Museum Fridericianum in Kassel and was a primary catalyst towards construction of the Hessisches Landesmuseum.

He conducted archaeological field studies at Samos (1894), Larissa (1902) and at Lesbos (1906). After his retirement, he returned to Larissa, where he performed excavatory work with Karl Schefold and Lennart Kjellberg. In addition to his work in classical archaeology, he also performed excavatory investigations in Germany — in 1894, with Felix von und zu Gilsa, he uncovered a Neolithic tomb (Züschen) near the town of Fritzlar, Hesse.

== Selected published works ==
- Samos : - die Kasseler Grabung 1894 in der Nekropole der archaischen Stadt von Johannes Boehlau und Edward Habich – Samos, an 1894 excavation in the necropolis of the ancient city.
- Neolithische denkmäler aus Hessen, (with Felix von und zu Gilsa), 1898 – Neolithic monument found in Hesse.
- Aus ionischen und italischen nekropolen; ausgrabungen und untersuchungen zur geschichte der nachmykenischen griechi schen kunst, 1898 – On Ionic and Italic necropoleis.
- Larisa am Hermos, die Ergebnisse der Ausgrabungen, 1902-1934 (co-author; 3 volumes) 1940–1942 – Larissa, Turkey: the results of excavations, 1902 to 1934.
