= Kjell Nilsson =

Kjell Nilsson can refer to:

- Kjell Nilsson (actor) (1949–2026), Swedish actor who relocated to Australia
- Kjell Nilsson (cyclist) (born 1962), Swedish cyclist
- Kjell Nilsson (footballer) (active 1957–58), Swedish footballer
- Kjell Nilsson (Swedish Air Force officer) (1943–2018), Swedish Air Force lieutenant general and sports administrator
