= Lennart Kjellberg =

Swedish classical archaeologist (1857–1936)

Anders Lennart Kjellberg (30 September 1857, in Uppsala – 7 May 1936, in Uppsala) was a Swedish classical archaeologist. He was the son of psychiatrist Gustaf Kjellberg (1827–1893).

From 1877 he studied at Uppsala University, earning his doctorate in 1889. In 1896 he became an associate professor of classical archaeology at Uppsala. He received the title of professor in 1913, and five years later became a full professor of classical archaeology.

In the summer of 1894, with Samuel Wide, he performed an archaeological excavation of the sanctuary of Poseidon on the island of Kalaureia. In the spring of 1902, with Johannes Boehlau, he conducted an archaeological dig on the site of the ancient city of Larissa in Asia Minor. Findings from these excavations where submitted in the Athenische Mittheilungen (1895) and the Språkvetenskapliga sällskapets i Uppsala förhandlingar (1900–03). In 1932/34, with Johannes Boehlau, he returned to the excavation site at Larissa.

== Published works ==
He is largely known for his studies involving ancient art history and Greek mythology, in particular, Asklepios, Mythologisch-archäologische Studien (Asclepius, Mythological-archaeological studies, 1894–97). Other noted works by Kjellberg include:

- Studien zu den antiken Dacheindeckungen, 1927 – Studies of ancient roofing.
- Die architektonischen Terrakotten, 1940; 2 volumes – Architectural terracotta.
- Larisa am Hermos, die Ergebnisse der Ausgrabungen, 1902–1934; 3 volumes (with Johannes Boehlau; Åke Åkerström) Berlin, W. de Gruyter, 1940-42 – Larissa, Turkey, results of excavations.
