= Kjellaug =

Kjellaug is a given name. Notable people with the name include:

- Kjellaug Nakkim (1940–2022), Norwegian politician
- Kjellaug Nordsjö (1926–2021), Swedish-Norwegian artist
- Kjellaug Pettersen (1934–2012), Norwegian senior government official, politician, and feminist
- Kjellaug Steinslett (1946–2011), Norwegian novelist
