= Kjetil Trøan =

Danish sound designer (born 1976)

Kjetil Trøan (IMDb) was one of the sound designers on the 2007 Academy Award winner "The Danish Poet". Works as a freelance sounddesigner. He and the others on the Danish Poet team was the first Norwegians to win an Oscar in over 50 years.

From http://www.ba-avis.no/eceRedirect?articleId=77456&pubId=1498%5B%5D
Layered and mixed the sound on Oscar - winner
By Morten Reiertsen
Kjetil Trøan (30) did the sound postproduction for Norways first Oscar - winner in 50 year. Kjetil Trøan has along with Håkon Lammetun and Frode Løes Hvatum in Lydhodene AS layered and mixed the sound on the Norwegian Oscar - winner, "The Danish poet" by Torill Kove. He met both the director and Liv Ullmann during recording and in post. – It was a beyond and above moment for me working on "The Danish Poet", Trøan replied. Read additional about this in the paperissue and in PDFedition. This was publiced in http://www.ba-avis.no a norwegian paper, at 27.02.2007 - 22:15Updated28.02.2007 - 12:34 and is translated to english.

In Norwegian.
