= Kjetil =

Kjetil is a Norwegian masculine given name. It may refer to:

- Kjetil Aleksander Lie (born 1980), Norwegian chess player, Norway's eighth International Grandmaster
- Kjetil André Aamodt (born 1971), Norwegian former alpine ski racer
- Kjetil Bang-Hansen (born 1940), Norwegian actor, dancer, stage producer and theatre director
- Kjetil Bjørklund (born 1967), Norwegian politician for the Socialist Left Party
- Kjetil Bjørlo (born 1968), Norwegian orienteering competitor
- Kjetil Borch (born 1990), Norwegian rower
- Kjetil Byfuglien (born 1977), Norwegian professional football defender
- Kjetil Knutsen (born 1968), Norwegian football manager
- Kjetil Jansrud (born 1985), Norwegian alpine skier and Olympic gold medalist
- Kjetil Løvvik (born 1972), retired Norwegian footballer
- Kjetil Mårdalen (1925–1996), Norwegian Nordic combined skier
- Kjetil Mørland (born 1980), Norwegian singer
- Kjetil Manheim, (born 1968), the drummer for the Norwegian black metal band Mayhem
- Kjetil Mulelid (born 1991), Norwegian jazz musician
- Kjetil Nilsen (born 1975), Norwegian football midfielder
- Kjetil Norland (born 1978), retired Norwegian football striker
- Kjetil Osvold (born 1961), retired Norwegian footballer
- Kjetil Rekdal (born 1968), Norwegian football coach and a former footballer
- Kjetil Ruthford Pedersen (born 1973), earlier Norwegian footballer
- Kjetil Sælen (born 1969), Norwegian football referee from Bergen
- Kjetil Siem (born 1960), Norwegian sports official
- Kjetil Skogrand (born 1967), Norwegian historian and politician for the Labour Party
- Kjetil Strand (born 1979), Norwegian handball player
- Kjetil Trædal Thorsen, Norwegian architect
- Kjetil Trøan, one of the sound designers on the 2007 Academy Award winner The Danish Poet
- Kjetil Tronvoll (born 1966), a peace and conflict researcher based in Oslo
- Kjetil Ulven (born 1967), Norwegian ski-orienteering competitor and world champion
- Kjetil Undset (born 1970), Norwegian competition rower and Olympic medalist
- Kjetil Wæhler (born 1976), Norwegian footballer
- Kjetil-Vidar Haraldstad (born 1973), the Norwegian drummer in the black metal bands Satyricon and 1349

== See also ==
- Ketil (name)
- Kettil (name)
