= Helene Böhlau =

German writer (1859–1940)

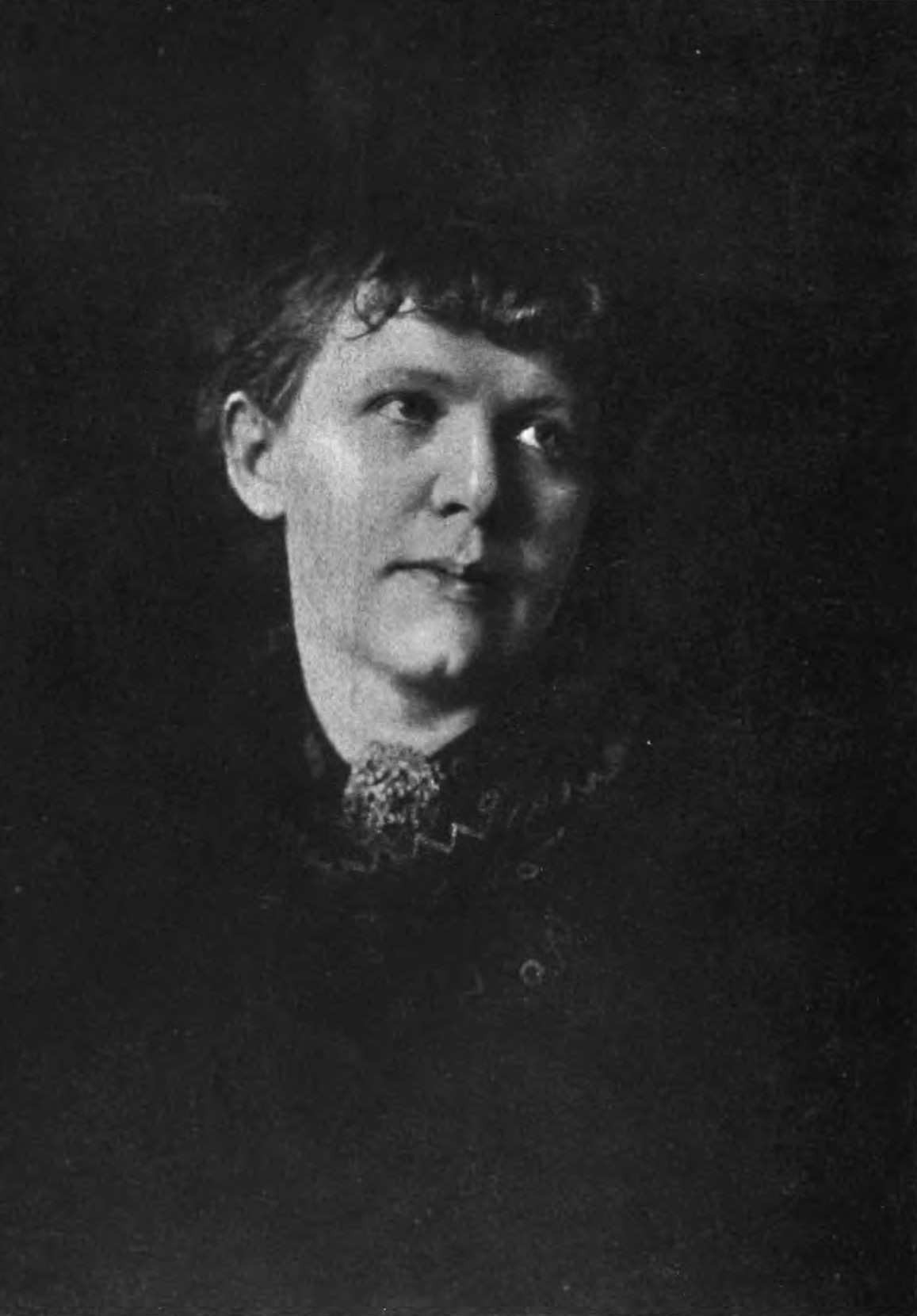
Portrait of Helene Böhlau

Helene Böhlau (German: [heˈleːnə ˈbøːlaʊ]; 22 November 1859 in Weimar – 26 March 1940 in Augsburg) was a German novelist.

== Biography ==
She traveled much in the East, married Omar al-Raschid Bey (born as Friedrich Arnd) in Istanbul, and settled down in Munich. In 1888 her sketches of Weimar (Ratsmädelgeschichten) brought her a large measure of fame. She showed a leaning toward the Romantic school now and then, but on the whole her descriptions were realistic and her writing was imbued with passion.

== Works ==
- Novellen (1882)
- Es hat nicht Sein Sollen (It shouldn't have been, 1891)
- Das Recht der Mutter (The mother's right, 1896; new ed., 1903)
- Neue Ratsmädel- und Weimarische Geschichten (1897)
- Halbtier (Half animal, 1899)
- Sommerbuch (1902)
- Die Kristallkugel (The crystal ball, 1903)
- Isebies (1911)

== Notes ==
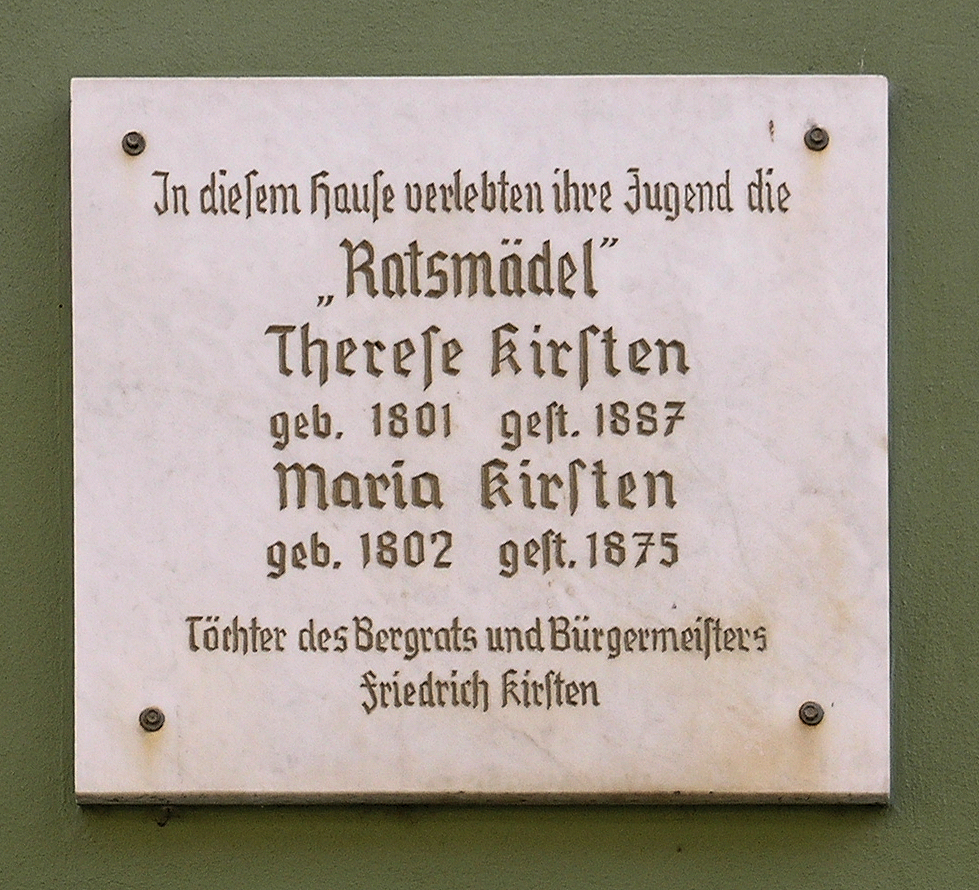
Helene Böhlau's Ratsmädel series made the daughters of Weimar Burgermeister Friedrich Kirsten known in all of Germany: Memorial tablet at Windischenstraße 13 in Weimar
