= Ketil Lenning =

Norwegian businessperson

Ketil Lenning (born 1950) is a Norwegian businessman.

Ketil Lenning graduated from the Texas A&M University with a Bachelor of Science in 1974. He became the chief operating officer of Odfjell Drilling in 2001 and chief executive officer in 2005. He is also chairman of the board of Odfjell Invest. Lenning has many years of experience from oil companies and within maritime drilling and oil production with companies such as Smedvig.
