= Équemauville =

- Commune
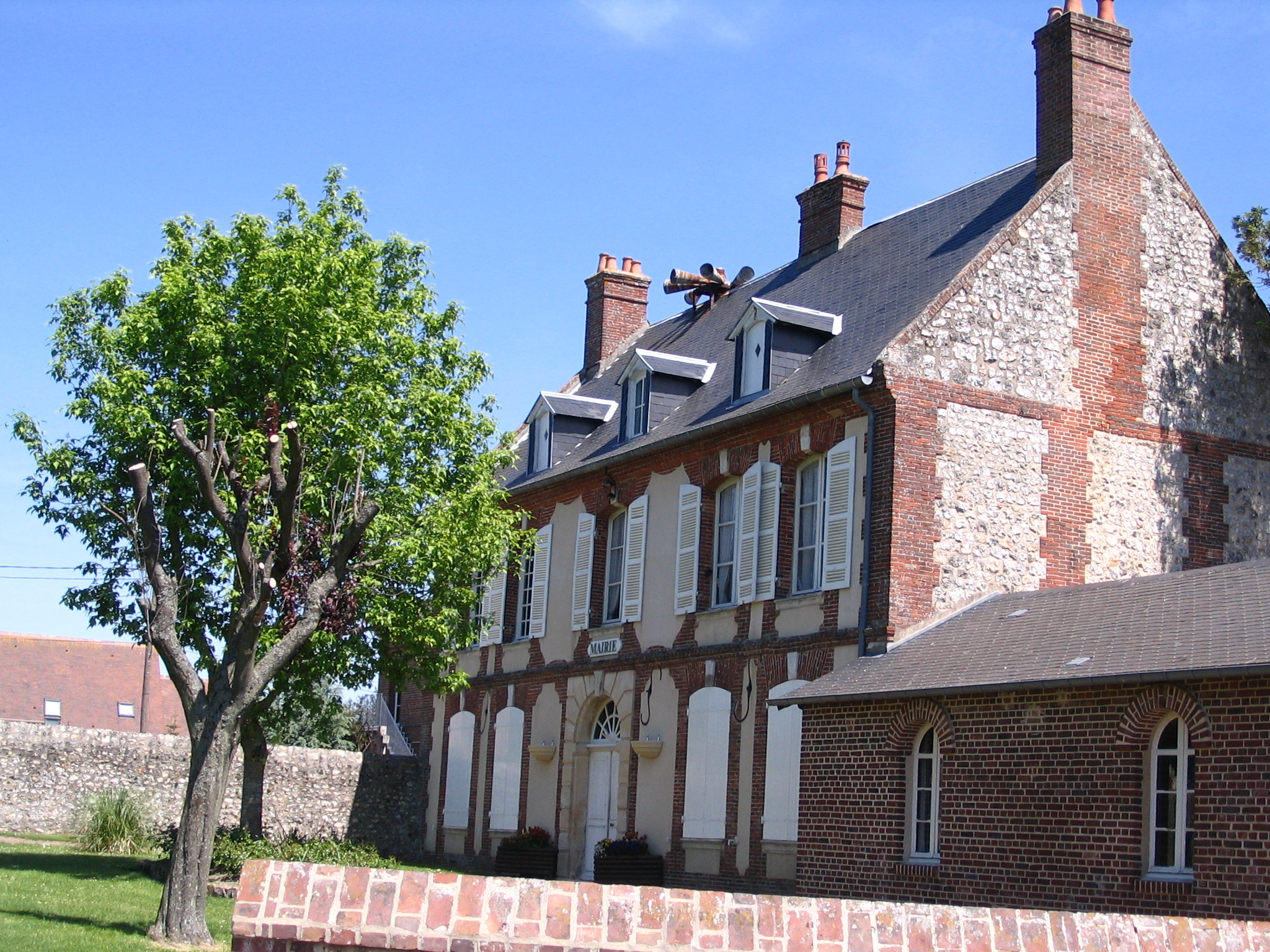
- Town hall

- Coat of arms
- Location of Équemauville
- Location within France Location within Normandy
- Coordinates: 49°23′37″N 0°12′35″E
- Country: France
- Region: Normandy
- Department: Calvados
- Arrondissement: Lisieux
- Canton: Honfleur-Deauville

Government
  - Mayor (2020–2026): Michel Bailleul
- Area^{1}: 5.98 km^{2} (2.31 sq mi)
- Elevation: 103 m (338 ft)
- Highest elevation: 119 m (390 ft)
- Lowest elevation: 20 m (66 ft)
- Population (2023): 1,574
  - Density: 263/km^{2} (682/sq mi)
- Time zone: UTC+01:00 (CET)
  - Summer (DST): UTC+02:00 (CEST)
- INSEE/Postal code: 14243 /14600
- ^{1} French Land Register data, which excludes lakes, ponds, glaciers > 1 km^{2} (0.386 sq mi or 247 acres) and river estuaries.

Équemauville (French pronunciation: [ekmovil]) is a commune in the Calvados department in the Normandy region in northwestern France.

== Personalities ==
- Zakaria Diallo, footballer
- Michel Serrault, actor

== Population ==
Historical population
Year	Pop.	±% p.a.
1968	629	—
1975	730	+2.15%
1982	914	+3.26%
1990	1,227	+3.75%
1999	1,212	−0.14%
2007	1,261	+0.50%
2012	1,367	+1.63%
2017	1,444	+1.10%
2023	1,574	+1.45%
Source: INSEE

== See also ==
- Communes of the Calvados department
