= Pennedepie =

- Commune
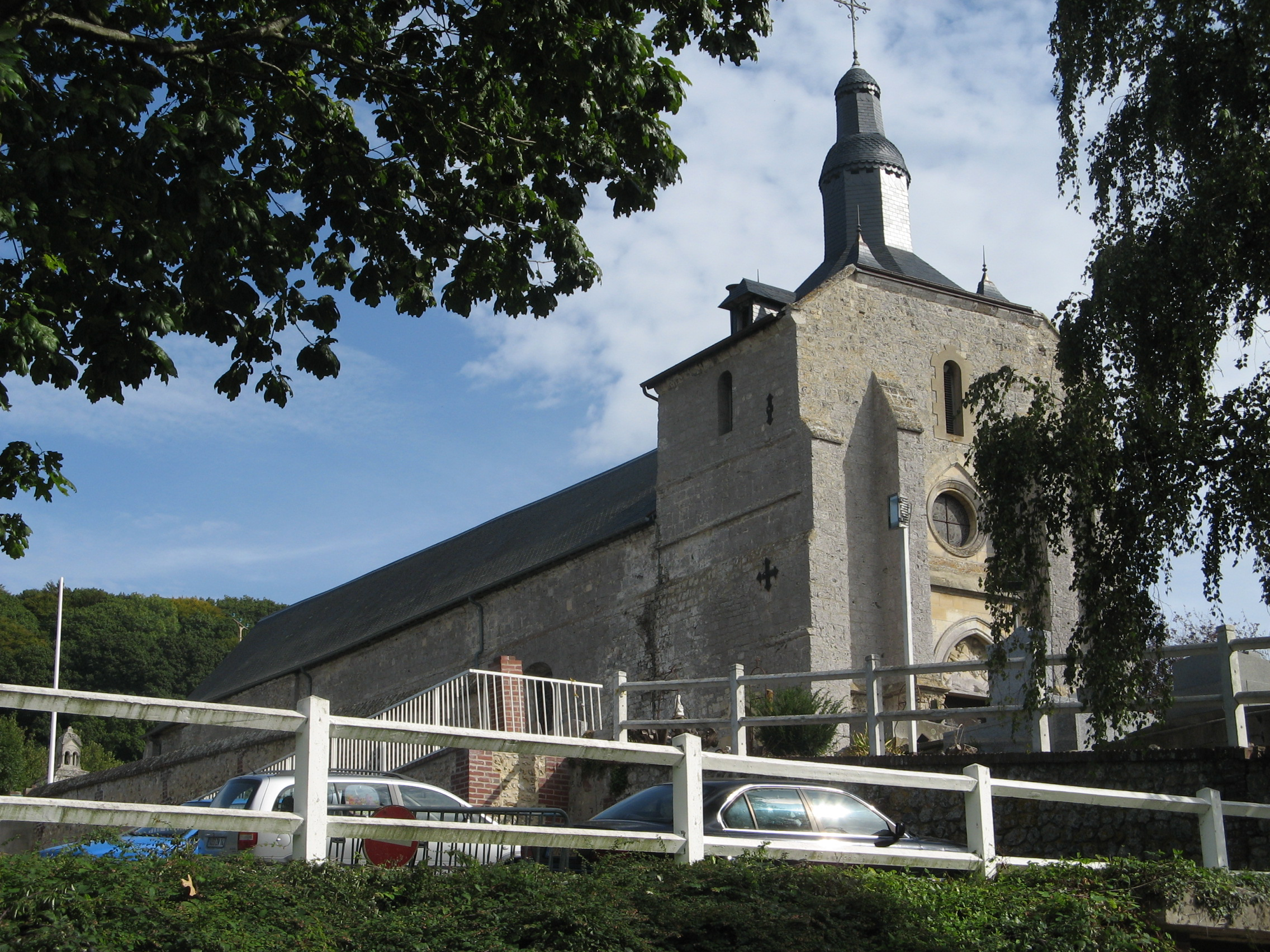
- The church in Pennedepie
- Location of Pennedepie
- Location within France Location within Normandy
- Coordinates: 49°24′28″N 0°10′38″E
- Country: France
- Region: Normandy
- Department: Calvados
- Arrondissement: Lisieux
- Canton: Honfleur-Deauville
- Intercommunality: Pays de Honfleur-Beuzeville

Government
  - Mayor (2020–2026): Michèle Levillain
- Area^{1}: 5.68 km^{2} (2.19 sq mi)
- Highest elevation: 138 m (453 ft)
- Lowest elevation: 1 m (3.3 ft)
- Population (2023): 306
  - Density: 53.9/km^{2} (140/sq mi)
- Time zone: UTC+01:00 (CET)
  - Summer (DST): UTC+02:00 (CEST)
- INSEE/Postal code: 14492 /14600
- ^{1} French Land Register data, which excludes lakes, ponds, glaciers > 1 km^{2} (0.386 sq mi or 247 acres) and river estuaries.

Pennedepie (French pronunciation: [pɛndəpi]) is a commune in the Calvados department in the Normandy region in northwestern France.

== Population ==
Historical population
| Year | Pop. | ±% p.a. |
|---|---|---|
| 1968 | 259 | — |
| 1975 | 227 | −1.87% |
| 1982 | 250 | +1.39% |
| 1990 | 234 | −0.82% |
| 1999 | 310 | +3.17% |
| 2007 | 319 | +0.36% |
| 2012 | 313 | −0.38% |
| 2017 | 290 | −1.51% |
| 2023 | 306 | +0.90% |
Source: INSEE

== See also ==
- Communes of the Calvados department
