= Kjeld Toft-Christensen =

Danish resistance fighter

- Born: 19 June 1910; Copenhagen, Denmark
- Died: 27 November 1945 (aged 35); Denmark

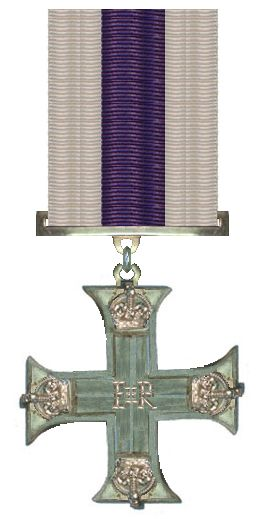

Kjeld Toft-Christensen MC (10 March 1910 – 27 November 1945), was a Special Operations Executive officer and Danish resistance fighter during the Second World War.

== Life ==
Born in Copenhagen to Aage Toft-Christensen and Elna Elise (née Bønnelycke), he emigrated from Denmark to join the French Foreign Legion.

During the Second World War Toft-Christensen served with the Free French in North Africa before he left for England where he joined the British Army. He was trained as a parachutist and in sabotage tactics in The Buffs (Royal East Kent Regiment) being promoted to the rank of Lieutenant. On 4 April 1944 he was dropped into Skive in Denmark to assist the local resistance under the codename "Dahl". Kjeld Toft-Christensen joined the resistance in Aarhus as a liaison and intelligence officer. He became a part of the newly-formed L-groups, focused on assassinations, and worked primarily in and around Aarhus.

On 29 April 1945 the Danish interpreter and informant Olaf Christian Quist (Dr. Peters) walked from his room at the Gestapo headquarters in the Old City Hall to the restaurant in Hotel Royal with three Gestapo officers. Christian Quist worked as interpreter during interrogations of resistance fighters and had long been wanted dead by the resistance. Happening to be in the Hotel Royal where Christian Quist was seated, Toft-Christensen approached the table and shot Christian Quist twice in the head and then opened fire on the 3 German SS officers who were incapacitated, wounded or killed. Toft-Christensen then left the hotel for a scheduled meeting with his resistance group, an episode which earned Kjeld Toft-Christensen much fame and admiration among fellow resistance fighters as it stands as one of the more daring operations in Aarhus during the war.

Kjeld Toft-Christensen survived the War but committed suicide on 27 November 1945, being posthumously awarded the British Military Cross in 1946.
