= Kjetil Byfuglien =

Norwegian footballer (born 1977)

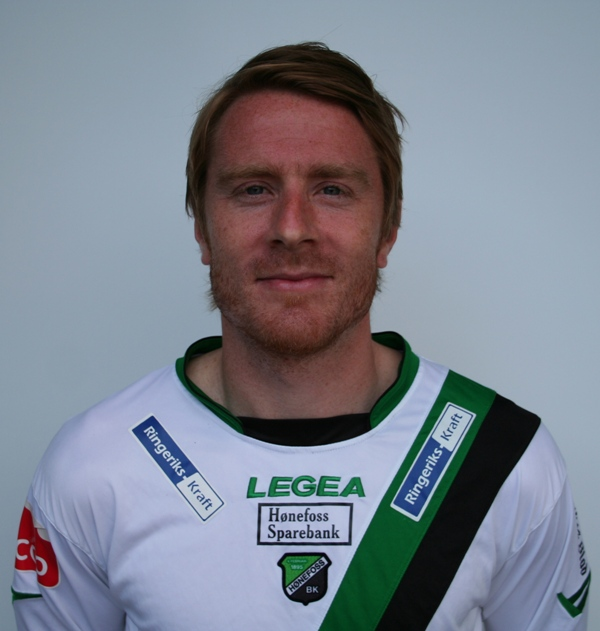

Personal information
- Full name: Kjetil Haaland Byfuglien
- Date of birth: 23 May 1977 (age 49)
- Place of birth: Oslo, Norway
- Height: 1.84 m (6 ft 1/2 in)
- Position: Left back

Youth career
- Haga
- NTG
- Stabæk

Senior career*
Years	Team	Apps	(Gls)
–2002	Asker		
2002–2006	Kongsvinger	125	(9)
2007–2011	Hønefoss	95	(2)
2012–2016	Jevnaker		
- * Club domestic league appearances and goals as of 8 December 2011

Kjetil Byfuglien (born 23 May 1977) is a retired Norwegian football defender.

Byfuglien played for Haga IF, NTG and Stabæk IF before joining Asker SK. While with Asker, he had a trial with English side Torquay United in November 2001 and was set for a trial with Queens Park Rangers later the same month.

He joined Kongsvinger IL in 2002 and played mostly left wing, but later during his stay he appeared more often at left-back. In October 2006 he left to join Hønefoss BK. In 2010, he made his debut for Hønefoss in the Norwegian Premier League. He finished his career at Jevnaker IF.
