= Reidar Kjellberg =

Norwegian art historian and museum director

Anders Reidar Kjellberg (19 April 1904 – 22 February 1978) was a Norwegian art historian and museum director.

== Biography ==
Anders Reidar Kjellberg was born in Fredrikstad in Østfold county, Norway. Kjellberg took his final exams in 1924 and began studying theology. However, he soon found out that he was more interested in the history of science, art history and literary history. In 1934 he took a master's degree in art history at the University of Oslo.

In 1934, he was hired as an assistant keeper at the Norwegian Museum of Cultural History (Norsk Folkemuseum), a large open-air museum located on Bygdøy in the Frogner borough of Oslo. He was promoted to deputy director in 1940. He became Director of the museum in 1947 as a replacement for the founding director, Hans Aall (1867- 1946). He remained museum director until he retired in 1974.

In 1951, the Sami collection in the Ethnographic Museum of the University of Oslo was transferred to the Norsk Folkemuseum. Kjellberg chaired the Broadcasting Council (Kringkastingsrådet), the advisory board to the Norwegian Broadcasting Corporation from 1951 to 1958 and the Association of Museums of Art and Cultural History (Norske Kunst- og Kulturhistoriske Museer) from 1957 to 1966.

In 1957, Kjellberg was elected a member of the Royal Gustavus Adolphus Academy and in 1962 of the Norwegian Academy of Science and Letters, where during the period 1964-1968 he was also a member of the Board. Reidar Kjellberg received the 1973 Oslo City Culture Award.

== Selected works ==
- Håndverkeren og kjøpmannen, i Norsk kulturhistorie, bd. 2 (1938)
- Blant laugsbrødre, ibid., bd. 3(1939)
- Et halvt århundre. Norsk Folkemuseum 1894–1944 (1945)
- Hugo Lous Mohr's takmalerier i Oslo domkirke (1952)
- Til Sparre Olsen på 50-årsdagen (1953)
- Thorbjørn Lie-Jørgensen (1961)
- Den store stasjon og andre kåserier (1965)

== Other sources ==
- Hegard, Tonte Hans Aall - mannen, visjonen og verket (Norsk Folkemuseum, Oslo: 1994)
- Norsk Folkemuseum Pa Nordmanns vis: Norsk folkemuseum gjennom 100 ar (Aschehoug, Oslo: 1993)
