= University of Montpellier School of Medicine =

- Motto: Olim Cous nunc Monspeliensis Hippocrates
- Motto in English: Once Hippocrates was from Kos, now he is from Montpellier
- Type: Medical school
- Established: August 17, 1220
- Affiliations: University of Montpellier
- Academic staff: 429
- Students: 14,476
- Location: Montpellier, France
- Campus: Urban
- Website: facmedecine.umontpellier.fr

The University of Montpellier School of Medicine is a French medical school, part of the University of Montpellier, which trains future medical and healthcare professionals and researchers in the field of life sciences.

Founded in 1220, it is the oldest university in the world in terms of medicine, in the legal and conceptual sense of the term “university” as defined in 13th-century Europe, in the same way that the universities of Paris, Oxford, and Bologna are the oldest in terms of theology, liberal arts (Paris), and law (Oxford and Bologna). It is the oldest medical school in the world still in operation. It celebrated its 800th anniversary throughout 2020 and 2021 and was the subject of a national commemorative postage stamp.

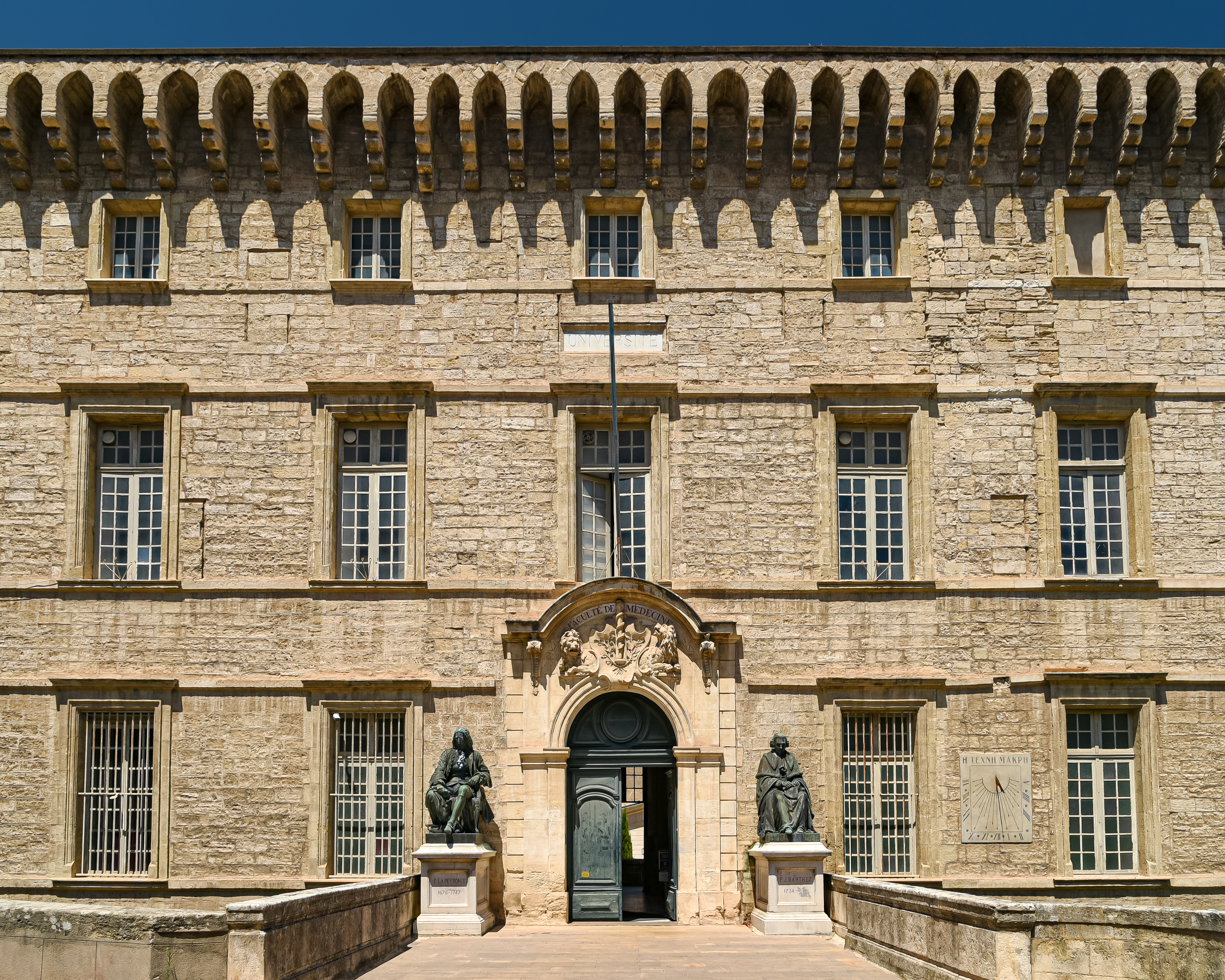
The medical school.

Unique in France, Montpellier Medical School has agreements with two university hospitals (CHU): Montpellier and Nîmes. The faculty is located in the city center of Montpellier, with historic buildings (rue de l'École-de-Médecine, biology institute: boulevard Henri-IV), close to the hospitals north of Montpellier (medical teaching unit, university clinical research institute, new Arnaud de Villeneuve Health Campus: avenue du Doyen-Giraud), and has a branch in Nîmes (chemin du Carreau-de-Lanes), close to the Carémeau University Hospital.

Its motto refers to the Hippocratic tradition that formed the basis of medical teaching when it was founded: Olim Cous nunc Monspeliensis Hippocrates (“Once Hippocrates was from Kos, now he is from Montpellier”).

== History ==
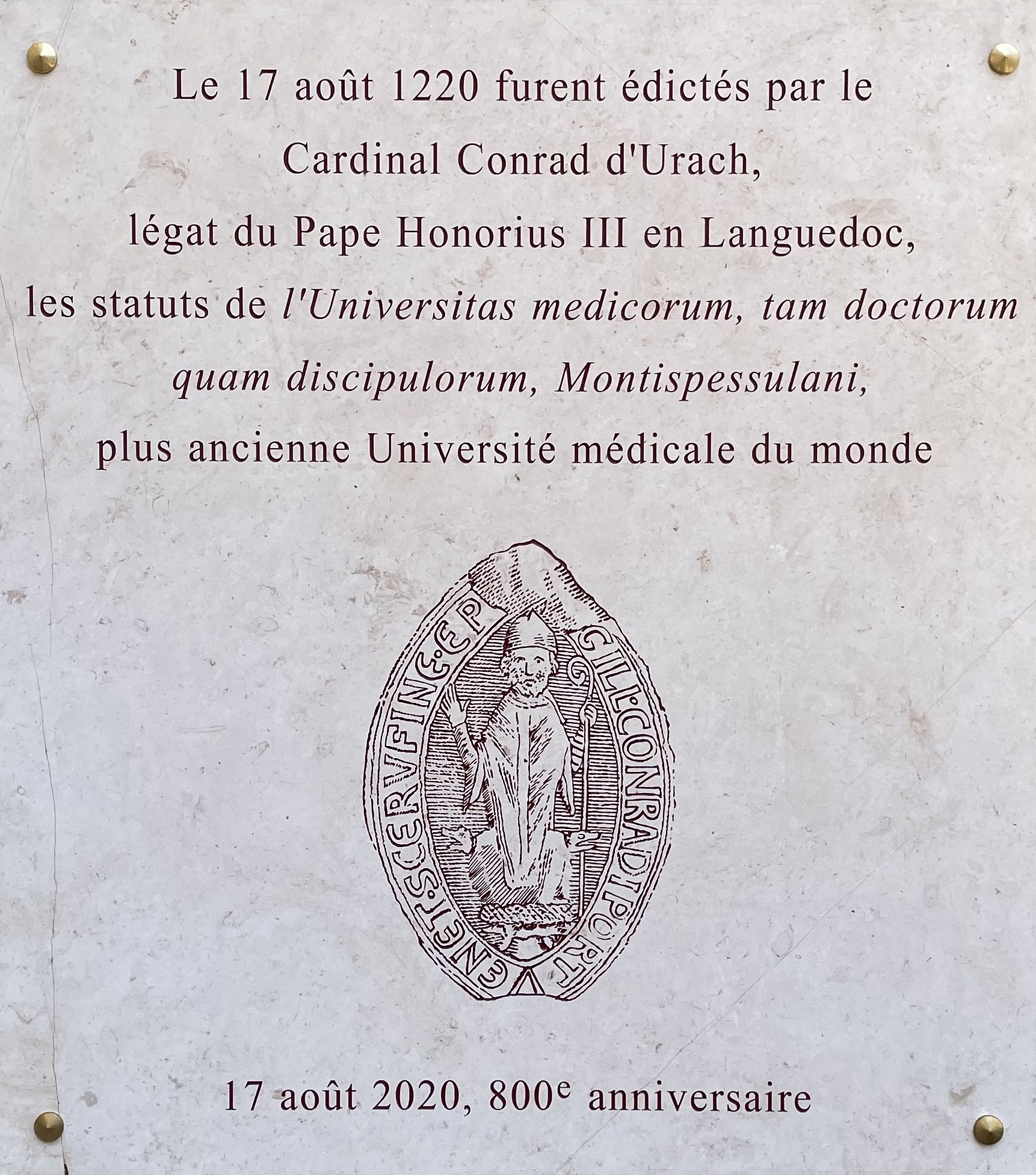
Commemorative plaque unveiled on August 17, 2020 (courtyard of the historic school building).

=== Middle Ages ===
==== Context ====
Montpellier is a new city dating back to the year 1000, benefiting from the urban and commercial boom that marked Europe during this period. Barbarian invasions, followed by the spread of Islam in the Mediterranean, had caused a rift between East and West, with the two worlds remaining relatively separate, each living in isolation. Then commercial and cultural exchanges began to develop.

Montpellier was just a modest village with a small sanctuary located near a road to Santiago de Compostela, next to larger cities such as Nîmes, Béziers, and Narbonne, where there were Jewish communities with renowned doctors. The reasons for Montpellier's development were mainly geographical: the city was ideally located at the crossroads of land and sea routes, with its port of Lattes (then the most important port between Genoa, Pisa, and Barcelona), especially since the ships of Lattes had obtained from the Pope the status of “absolved ships,” meaning they had the privilege of trading with infidels. The latter were very close by, as they occupied a large part of Spain and the Balearic Islands.

==== Origins ====
Many travelers, merchants, doctors, and scholars passed through Montpellier on their way between the Iberian and Italian peninsulas, allowing for the sharing of influences from the Arab-Andalusian and Byzantine worlds. A large medical community quickly formed in Montpellier in the 12th century, which was very rare in medieval Europe at the time, apart from the School of Medicine in Salerno, where medical teaching had developed since the 9th century.

In this context, medical education in Montpellier emerged from practice, outside any institutional framework, at the beginning of the 12th century. Medical practice was based on ancient Greek writings preserved by the Arabs. These were translated and enriched by Arab-Persian science (including Avicenna, among others), which reached Europe thanks to the Al-Andalus civilization present on the Iberian Peninsula and through Latin and Sicilian culture (with, for example, Constantine the African, a monk from Tunisia who translated Arabic).

In 1181, Guilhem VIII, Lord of Montpellier, granted “every man, whoever he may be and wherever he may come from” the right to “run a school of medicine in Montpellier.” In the entrance hall of the faculty's historic building, a plaque states that a third of Montpellier's first illustrious doctors were Jewish. This freedom to teach medicine undoubtedly contributed to the city's growing reputation, but also led to the spread of medical knowledge in a completely unregulated manner.

==== Organisation ====
In 1220, the need arose to supervise, organize, and guarantee the teaching of medicine in Montpellier. Thus, Cardinal Conrad of Urach, apostolic legate of Pope Honorius III, granted the “universitas medicorum” its first statutes.

It is a legal charter granted by the ruling authority (the papacy), which precisely determines who can teach, how justice is administered within the university, and what rules govern relations between teachers and students, based on a balance of rights and duties between these two communities.

This founding act was part of an international geopolitical struggle for influence between popes and emperors surrounding the creation of the first universities in the 13th century.: Oxford (Kingdom of England, law), Paris (Kingdom of France, theology and liberal arts), Bologna (Holy Roman Empire, law) and Montpellier (Crown of Aragon, medicine). In addition to these political aspects, there were also ideological interests. In addition to the fact that medical education had undoubtedly become so deregulated since the edict of Guilhem VIII that there was a certain amount of charlatanism, the founding of the first medical university in history would also have been part of the war against Catharism, which is the most likely historical hypothesis today.

In fact, the apostolic legate who founded the medical university had been sent to Languedoc with a single mission: to combat the Cathar heresy by any means necessary. As Professor François-Olivier Touati aptly describes, the preamble to the 1220 statutes refers implicitly but unambiguously to heresy. The promotion of medicine by the Church, which is enshrined in these statutes, represents a complete paradigm shift in the Church's attitude towards medicine, which is even elevated to the status of a university science, whereas until then it had been viewed with great reservations and restrictions (until the Fourth Lateran Council in 1215). Furthermore, medicine, whose objective is to improve physical health, would go against Cathar ideology, and by controlling the training of doctors, the Church also gained a monopoly on medical practice, preventing any involvement of doctors with the Cathars.

An institutional framework developed around medical education in less than a century. On October 26, 1289, Pope Nicholas IV sent the bull “Quia Sapientia” from Rome to all doctors and students in the city of Montpellier, thereby officially creating the University of Montpellier, which encompassed medicine, law, and the liberal arts. "The degrees awarded by the University of Montpellier shall be universal in nature, as they are guaranteed by the Pope through the Bishop of Maguelone, his representative. The diploma awarded to graduates will grant them a license to practice hic et ubique terrarum, a formula that will be piously preserved until the Revolution in medical license letters" and will be adopted as the motto of the University of Paris.

However, the doctors refused to allow their school to become a mere component of a comprehensive university and decided to continue operating independently as a “university of doctors” (Universitas medicorum). In a unique event in the history of universities, the independence of the University of Medicine in Montpellier continued until the creation of the Imperial University (Université de France) in 1808, when it became a component (faculty) of that institution. This singularity probably explains the specificity of medical education in Montpellier, which, independent of other faculties, did not focus exclusively on medicine but instead integrated many fields of knowledge (natural sciences, philosophy, literature, arts, etc.).

Until the early 14th century, the medical university did not occupy its own building. Classes were held in the morning at the teachers' homes, consisting of reading and interpreting ancient texts, of which the teacher had a copy. In the afternoon, teachers and students would visit patients to practice and teach medicine “at the sickbed.” The university's activities (debates on various topics known as “disputes,” exams, thesis defenses, university assemblies, etc.) took place in the city's churches (Saint-Firmin, which was also responsible for archiving all the medical university's records, Notre-Dame des Tables, and the Salle L'Évêque, the Montpellier residence of the Bishop of Maguelone). In 1340, the university created an official course in anatomy using cadavers, one of the earliest in university history, which would make it famous.

The 1360s saw the construction of the city's very first university buildings, commissioned by Pope Urban V: the College of Twelve Doctors (or College of Mende, also known as the Pope's College, on Rue Alexandre Germain[1]), [2]) and the College of Saint Benoît Saint Germain (initially intended for law and theology students, then a bishop's palace in 1536, and finally a historic building of the Faculty of Medicine since 1795[2],[3]). The College of Saint Benedict was associated with a Benedictine monastery and had an abbey church with a remarkable silhouette (four square towers preceded by a porch with two cylindrical pillars)[2],[3], which in the Middle Ages was the “university church”[4] for all students in Montpellier (now Saint Pierre Cathedral).

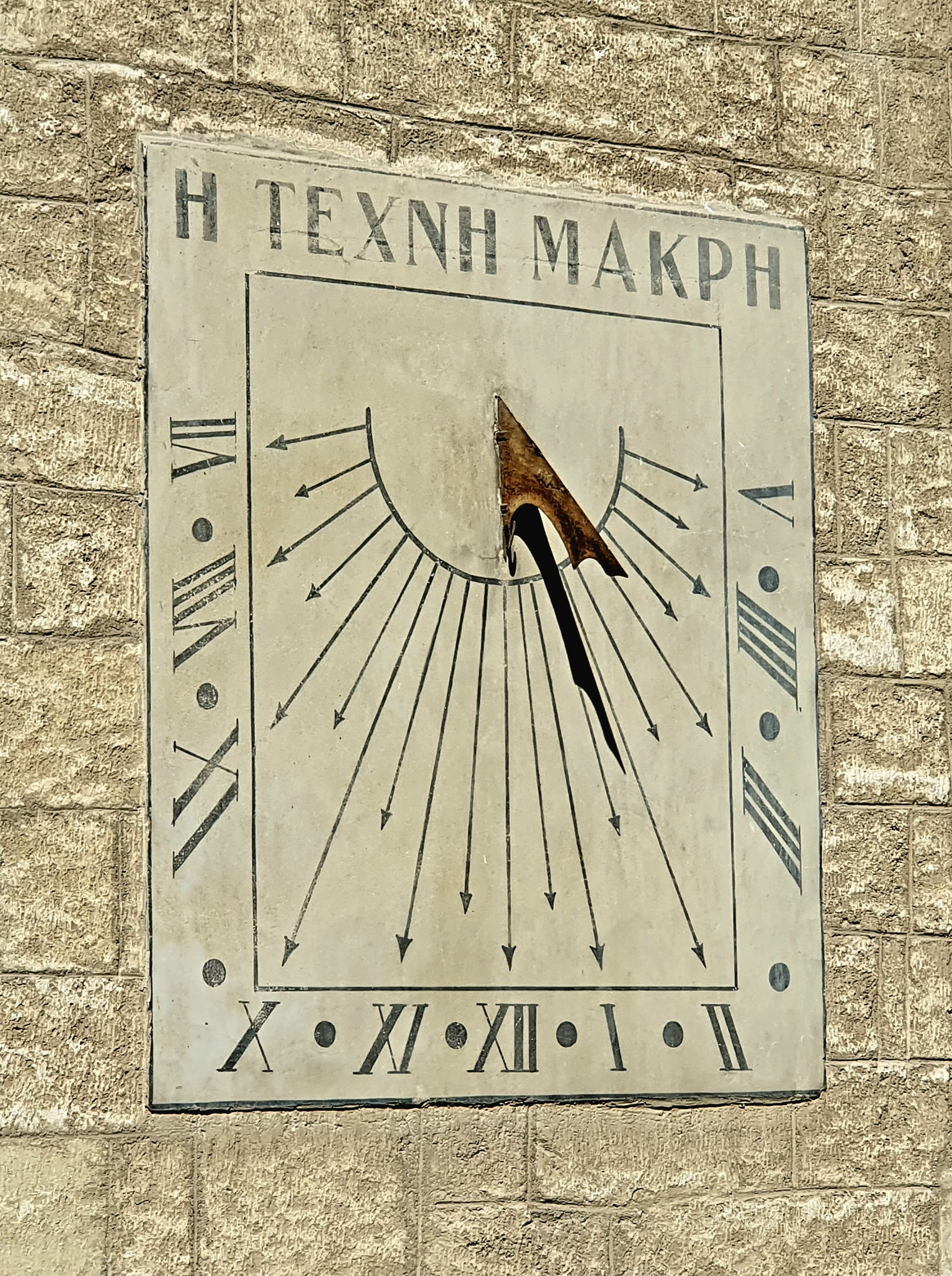
Sundial on the façade of the School of Medicine in Montpellier, bearing the inscription “H TEXNH MAKPH” (“Art is long”), taken from the aphorisms of Hippocrates.

The medical school enjoyed great prestige, with a reputation for having inherited the knowledge of Al-Andalus (Muslim Andalusia), and welcomed students from all over Europe. Its influence benefited from its proximity to Avignon (the papacy) and the teaching of illustrious masters, including Arnaud de Villeneuve and Guy de Chauliac. Clinical teaching plays an important role, constituting another distinctive feature of medical education in Montpellier, a legacy of the School of Salerno and, more generally, of medieval Arab-Persian medicine, which combined doctrine and practice, including surgery in particular.

=== Renaissance ===
The Renaissance was characterized by a renewal of teaching at the University of Medicine in Montpellier, which was then a renowned intellectual center throughout Europe.

From the Renaissance to the end of the Ancien Régime, education was marked by the gradual loss of clerical control in favor of the state. The faculty acquired its own premises in 1469 and new rules were enacted by royal decree of Louis XII on August 24, 1498, establishing the "Royal College of Medicine". This building was located near the current Saint-Mathieu church, on Rue du Bout du Monde (a popular phonological distortion of "Bout du Mont"), also known as "Rue des Médecins" due to the presence of the homes of many masters. It was also at the end of this street that the college of twelve doctors (or college of Mende, as it gave preference to students from Gévaudan, see above) was located, opposite which another college, the college of Girona (for medical students of Catalan origin), was built in 1452. During the Renaissance, the college in Mende took the name “college of the Pope” in contrast to the royal college of medicine (college of the King) built in the same streets. While the colleges of Mende and Girone were colleges in the medieval sense of the term, i.e., places of study but also and above all places of accommodation for less fortunate students, the royal college was the first dedicated premises of the university of medicine, bringing together all the teachers and students for lessons, botany (herb garden), and dissections. In 1556, the university became the first in France to have an amphitheater dedicated to the examination of cadavers.

The reign of Henry IV left Montpellier with a sense of academic rebirth. The medical school was endowed with a “plant garden” in 1593. The brainchild of a king, it was the work of a professor of medicine, Pierre Richer de Belleval. The first official botanical garden in France, predating the one in Paris, it remains one of Montpellier's greatest treasures to this day.

=== Age of Enlightenment and Revolution ===
Until the end of the Ancien Régime, Montpellier was in rivalry with Paris but nevertheless provided most of the king's chief physicians, whose role was both medical and political (equivalent to the Minister of Health). It was Pierre Chirac, a native of Montpellier, who, as the king's chief physician, involved (with varying degrees of success) the University of Medicine of Montpellier in the health management of the last major plague epidemic on metropolitan soil in Marseille in 1720.

The 18th century was marked by an ideological, societal, and political revolution in which the medical university played its own part. On the scientific front, many professors contributed to Diderot and d'Alembert's Encyclopédie, including Barthez, Bordeu, Fouquet, Ménuret de Chambaud, and above all Gabriel-François Venel, who authored 730 articles in the Encyclopédie, spanning from volume II, published in 1752, to volume XVII, published in 1765. According to Professor Jean-Pierre Dedet, “his chapter on chemistry was a plea in favor of this discipline, considered an autonomous science, totally separate from alchemy”.

Many doctors trained at medical school made their mark on this century, such as Pierre Marie Auguste Broussonet. This botanist and physician, a member of the Royal Society of London and the Academy of Sciences in Paris, brought back the ginkgo biloba from China, which was the first to be planted in France in the Montpellier Botanical Garden (specifically in 1795 by Antoine Gouan, the garden's first director, a title that replaced that of royal intendant after the Revolution).

The French Revolution was an extremely turbulent period, including in terms of university education. By an act of August 12, 1792, the National Assembly closed all universities and schools in France (institutions affiliated with the Ancien Régime and the Church) and confiscated their property. In August 1793, academies and learned societies (institutions affiliated with corporatism) were abolished, including the Royal Botanical Garden of Montpellier, which was then placed under the authority of the municipal council. Fortunately, the municipality prevented the garden from being completely transformed into a vegetable garden intended to feed the population in these times of scarcity. Barthez, then chancellor of the university, went into hiding in Narbonne because he was suspected of royalist sympathies, and it was the dean of the university (the most senior teacher) who remained to teach the classes and took over the role of chancellor for the first time. Fortunately, Dean Gaspard-Jean René was also a member of the municipal council and, together with the other members, who were doctors, surgeons, and apothecaries, influenced the municipality's decision to confiscate the property of the Royal College of Medicine (university) in order to preserve it. With the complicity of the municipality and the local court, medical teaching continued clandestinely in Montpellier, and in 1793 the professors were even paid and reimbursed for their expenses by the municipality In other words, Montpellier Medical University is the only one in France to have provided continuous education throughout its history.

Large entrance hall of the historic building

As early as 1794, faced with the need to train doctors, particularly military doctors to accompany the revolutionary armies, the National Convention decreed (decree of December 4, 1794 (14 Frimaire, Year III)) the establishment of three medical schools (Montpellier, Paris, and Strasbourg) providing medical and surgical training.

In 1795, the faculty left its old, cramped premises (the Royal College of Medicine) and moved to its current location, the Saint-Benoît monastery, which had been the city's bishopric since 1536, adjacent to Saint-Pierre Cathedral, and confiscated during the Revolution as national property. Since then, it has been the historic building of the faculty of medicine. The Royal College building became the school of pharmacy, one of the three oldest in France, created alongside Paris and Strasbourg in 1803 in the three cities with a health school.

=== Consulate, French Empire, and 19th century ===
The early 19th century followed immediately after the French Revolution and the Enlightenment.

In the new premises of the school of health acquired during the French Revolution, Jean-Antoine Chaptal had an anatomy theater built. Medicine and surgery were brought together, as evidenced a few decades later by the inauguration of the two statues flanking the entrance to the faculty: François Gigot de la Peyronie and Paul Joseph Barthez, the surgeon and physician who were emblematic of the faculty in the 18th century. The period from 1794 to 1803 was a fruitful phase of reform and the teaching of new scientific ideas. The decree of March 11, 1803 (20 Ventôse, Year XI) made it compulsory to obtain a doctorate in order to practice medicine. The decree of March 17, 1808 established the functioning of the Imperial University (University of France). The University of Medicine of Montpellier became a faculty, part of the University. The teaching of medicine in the modern era thus found a fixed institutional framework and was able to develop without major crisis. The reciprocal contribution between teaching and hospital practice would only continue from then on. The Montpellier School of Medicine alone trained 45% of the doctors practicing in France at the beginning of the 19th century.

Starting in 1804, the medical school acquired a historic university library, once again under the political impetus of Professor Jean-Antoine Chaptal, then Minister of the Interior under First Consul Bonaparte. Faculty professors, such as Victor-Gabriel Prunelle, were officially commissioned by the minister to investigate revolutionary collections throughout France and Europe, with the aim of selecting and collecting works for the faculty's new library. In keeping with the spirit of the Enlightenment and the spirit of the Montpellier medical school throughout the centuries, which is that of a medicine interested in the human being as a whole and in his or her environment, the Montpellier professors gathered reference works not only in medicine and anatomy but also in all fields of knowledge, including history, geography, literature, poetry, music, etc. A prestigious library was thus created, housing 100,000 printed works from the early 19th century, including 300 incunabula and a thousand manuscripts dating back to the 8th century, such as: 327 manuscripts from the Troyes library, Charlemagne's psalter, the Montpellier songbook (the only existing collection of 13th-century French motets), and the Tonaire de Saint-Bénigne de Dijon, written in the 11th century and considered the “Rosetta Stone” of Gregorian chant.

The Montpellier School of Medicine is affiliated with the University of Montpellier, in accordance with the law of July 10, 1896.

Finally (in every sense of the word), women entered university at the end of the 19th century. Agnes McLaren from Scotland was the first female doctoral graduate (1878), and Pauline Lautaud was the first French woman (1894). That same year, Glafira Ziegelmann, originally from Russia, enrolled and became the first female intern in provincial hospitals (1897), then the first female head of clinic at the faculty, and the first woman in France to be admitted to the competitive examination for the agrégation in medicine (written and anonymous). However, despite the support of her professors in Montpellier, she was not accepted in the oral examination in Paris because she was a woman (1910). Glafira continued her brilliant career in gynecology and obstetrics in Montpellier and replaced her husband, Amans Gaussel, as director of the Montpellier sanatorium when he was called up for military service during the war. Their children immortalized the couple in a painting of their mother depicted in a painting of their father, who had become a professor, in the faculty's assembly hall. She is the only woman featured in a painting at the faculty. In 2020, a lecture hall bearing her name was inaugurated in the presence of her family at the faculty's new health campus.

=== 20th century ===
The beginning of the century was marked by the Great War, during which the faculty lost many doctors at the front. Nevertheless, teaching and scientific activities were reorganized at the faculty from the outset of the conflict. Of the 59 theses defended during the 1914-1915 academic year, seven related to the war.

During World War II, the faculty entered a dark period. After Dean Euzière resigned, the rector pushed Gaston Giraud into the dean's position. Jewish students were protected as much as possible, as were, from 1943 onwards, the students who left in large numbers for the Service du travail obligatoire (STO) in Germany.

The long tenure of Dean Gaston Giraud (1941-1960) was marked by considerable work carried out on all of the faculty's buildings. The Institute of Biology was expanded (1937 and 1960). The faculty's historic building (the former Saint Benoît college) underwent extensive restoration. In 1957, the building housing the anatomy laboratories was also constructed, adjoining the historic building along Boulevard Henri-IV. Until 2017, this building still housed the human bodies used for anatomy classes and the body donation service.

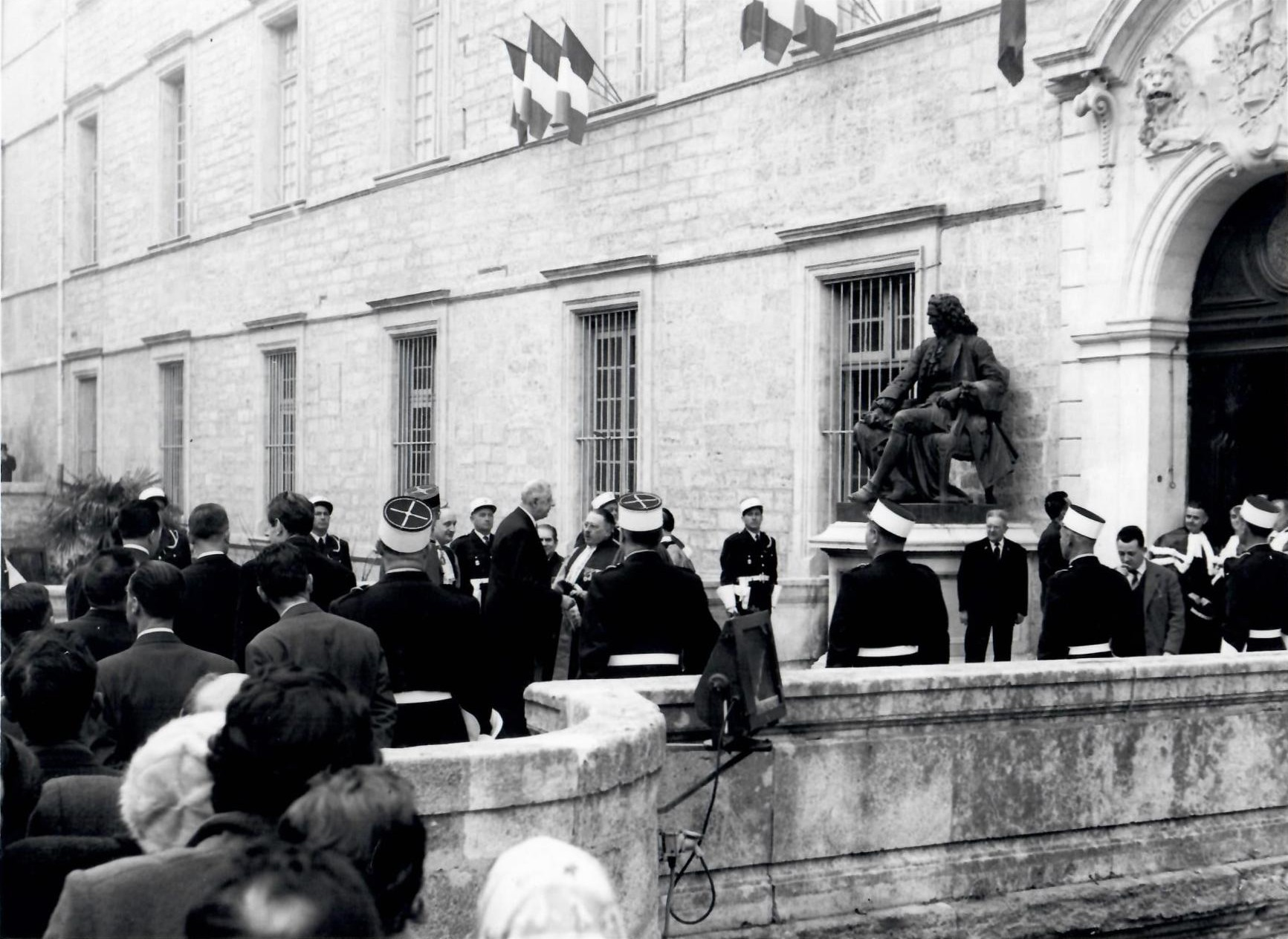
Charles de Gaulle's visit to the Montpellier School of Medicine on February 28, 1960

The 1950s and 1960s saw significant changes at the national institutional level with regard to medical education and higher education more generally. University hospitals (CHUs) were created in 1958 as part of the medical education reform proposed by Professor Robert Debré. The faculty entered into an agreement with Montpellier University Hospital. Higher education was then restructured after the events of May 1968: the School of Medicine ceased to exist as a legal entity in 1969 and was integrated into Montpellier-1 University, in accordance with the law of November 12, 1968 (the Edgar Faure Law), becoming a Teaching and Research Unit (UER), then a Training and Research Unit (UFR) (Savary Law of 1984).

In 1972, a branch of the UFR was created in Nîmes (on the site of the Carémeau University Hospital). Since 1995, it has offered a complete medical education (from the first year to the end of the internship). The curriculum is identical to that of the Montpellier site.

=== 21st century ===
The first stone of the new Arnaud de Villeneuve health campus (avenue du doyen Gaston Giraud) was symbolically laid in April 2015. This new 11,440 m² building, spread over six floors, together with the adjacent UPM, accommodates all students enrolled at the Montpellier site in medicine, midwifery, speech therapy, orthoptics, and advanced nursing practice, i.e. nearly 3,600 students. With an estimated cost of €40.6 million, the project was mainly financed by the Occitanie region. It is the work of architect François Fontès and opened its doors at the start of the 2017 academic year.

On 1 January 2015, the University of Montpellier 1 and the University of Montpellier 2 merged to form the newly recreated University of Montpellier. Meanwhile, the Paul Valéry University Montpellier 3, now only Paul Valéry, remains a separate institution.

In 2020 and 2021, the medical school celebrated its 800th anniversary and was featured on a national commemorative postage stamp depicting the union of the two buildings, historic and contemporary, symbolizing the past, present, and future.

== Research ==
Public medical research in Montpellier is considered to be among the most successful in France and worldwide.

=== The laboratories ===
The school houses numerous research laboratories belonging to the University of Montpellier in most fields of health and biology, complementing the clinical research carried out at the university hospitals in Montpellier and Nîmes. It is home to twenty-one university research teams:

- A Labex in collaboration with INSERM, CNRS, and the Research Institute for Development: “EpiGenMed” (human genetics);
- Fourteen joint research units (UMR) in collaboration with CNRS, INSERM, IRD in the fields of regenerative medicine, immunotherapy, molecular biology, cell biology, metabolism, genetics, neurology, neuroscience, epidemiology and biostatistics, virology, endocrinology, oncology, etc.;
- Six university research teams accredited by the Ministry in the fields of cardiovascular disease, metabolism, genetics, rare diseases, parasitology, etc.

=== The doctoral school ===
The CBS2 doctoral school (chemical and biological sciences for health) trains PhD students in all areas of biology and health, from drug chemistry to clinical practice, and from genetics to behavior. With more than 470 HDR supervisors and over 380 doctoral students spread across nearly 40 laboratories in the Faculty of Medicine, the Faculty of Pharmacy, and the Faculty of Science, it is one of the largest doctoral schools in France.

== See also ==
=== Bibliography ===
- A. Germain (1877). "Les étudiants de l'École de médecine de Montpellier au 16th century. Étude historique sur le Liber procuratoris studiosorum". Revue historique. 3: 31–70.
- Louis Dulieu (1975). La médecine à Montpellier (in French). Vol. 1. Avignon: Les Presses Universelles. p. 386. OCLC 489145462.

=== Related articles ===
- University of Montpellier
- Centre hospitalier universitaire de Montpellier

=== External links ===
- Official website
