= Louis Lépecq de La Clôture =

French surgeon and epidemiologist

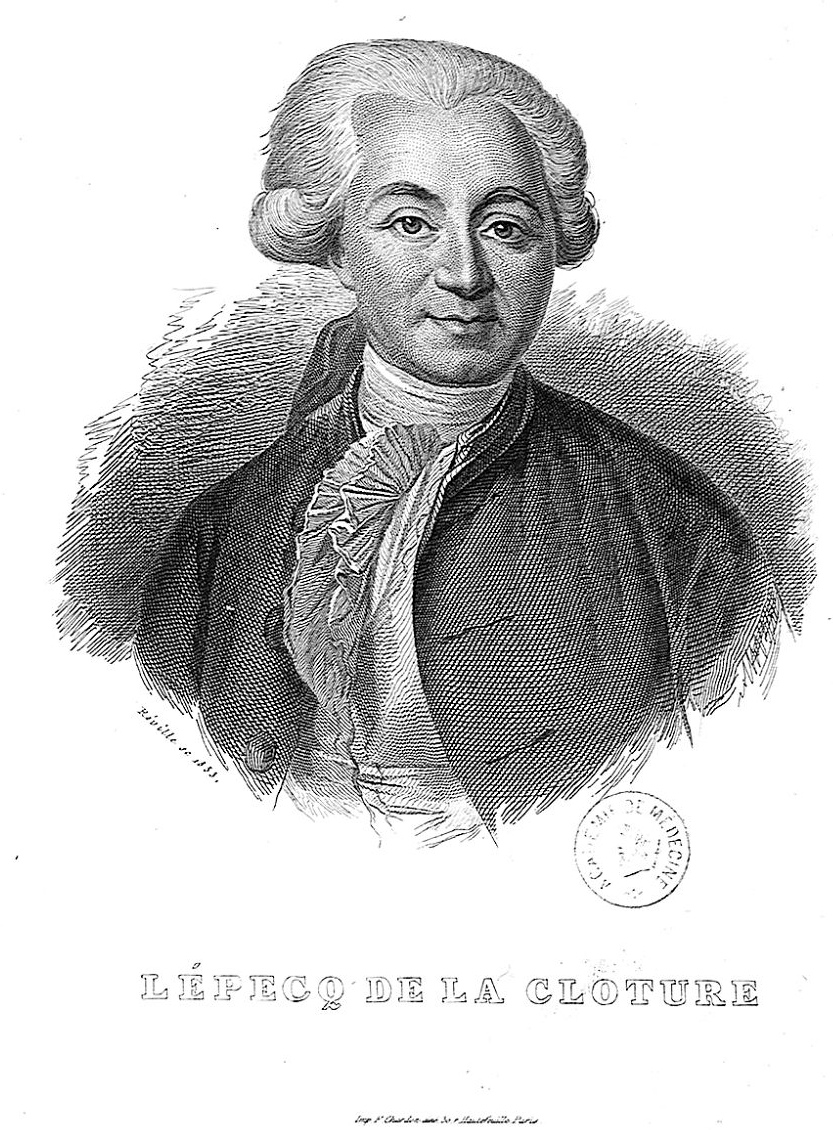
- Louis Lépecq de La Clôture, engraving by Jean-Baptiste Réville
- Born: 12 July 1736; Caen, Calvados, France
- Died: 5 November 1804 (aged 68); Saint-Pierre-Azif, Calvados, France
- Years active: 1763–1794
- Known for: Observations sur les maladies épidémiques (Observations on epidemic diseases)
- Medical career
- Profession: Surgeon
- Field: Epidemiology
- Institutions: Hôpital de la Charité
- Awards: Ennobled by Louis XVI

Louis Lépecq de La Clôture (12 July 1736 – 5 November 1804) was a French surgeon and epidemiologist. His work consisted mainly of a 15-year observation of the relations between climate, geography and pathologies in Normandy.

== Biography ==
Son of Louis Lépecq de La Clôture (1706–1742), doctor-regent and professor of surgery at the Faculty of Medicine in Caen and Madeleine Pyron, he was born in Caen in Calvados. He began his medical studies in Caen where, in 1755, he obtained his medical degree. After a stay in Paris where he worked at the Hôpital de la Charité, notably under the direction of Théophile de Bordeu who taught him to "replace words with facts" he returned to Caen (1763) as an agrégé at the Faculty and Professor of Surgery.

In 1769, he went to Rouen, where he was agrégé at the College of Physicians then appointed doctor of the Hôtel-Dieu de Rouen, then doctor of the Prisons and doctor of the Généralité for epidemic diseases. He married Marie Claude Lebon there in 1780.

He quickly abandoned surgery to devote himself to medicine and especially epidemiology. He began criss-crossing Normandy to gather observations on the relationship between diseases and the environment.

He first published in 1776 a rather classical work on observations of epidemic diseases, based on Hippocrates' table of epidemics, by Order of the Government and at the expense of the King.

At the same time, he joined forces with all the doctors of Normandy and invited them to communicate to him the details relating to the medical topography of the places where they lived and criss-crossed Normandy for several years to collect the observations necessary for the drafting of a Collection of observations on diseases and epidemic constitutions (Collection d'observations sur les maladies et constitutions épidémiques), by Order of the Government and dedicated to the King. In 1782, he became president of the Académie des sciences, belles-lettres et arts de Rouen then associate member of the Société royale de médecine de Paris. Recognised for his work, he was knighted by Louis XVI in 1785.

But the King's reward almost became fatal to him for, if his successes had admirers, they also had envious ones. They took advantage of the disturbances of the revolution and had him imprisoned as a suspect during the Terror: he was held for a long time and was only released after cruel suffering. Disgusted with the city of Rouen, Lépecq withdrew in 1794 to Saint-Pierre-Azif, his family's homeland. Despite his fortune, he did not remain idle and devoted the rest of his life to medicine.

"We still remember in the country this good old man, tormented by gout, whom we used to meet at all hours, in all seasons, riding through the countryside to visit some poor sick person under his thatched roof."

He died in Saint-Pierre-Azif in 1804.

== Works ==
Lépecq de la Clôture applied the teachings of his master Théophile de Bordeu, the leader of vitalism in France. Following Haller's work, they practised observation and experimentation. Although it is opposed to mechanism (Democritus, Descartes, Cabanis), vitalism (Paul-Joseph Barthez) should not be confused with animism (Georg Ernst Stahl): the animist does not simply subordinate matter to life, he submits matter to life and life to thought. On the contrary, vitalist philosophers consider intellectual activity to be fundamentally subordinate to life. At the time, the main merit of vitalism was to give back its meaning and originality to life, reduced to the extreme since Descartes and the mechanistic conception of life he imposed by assimilating organic life to an infinitely complicated automaton, but governed by the laws of inanimate matter. Barthez's theory will be taken up by Xavier Bichat, who roots vitalism in an authentic scientific approach.

The book Collection d'observations sur les maladies et constitutions épidémiques is divided into four parts.

- The first, which occupies the first volume, contains a general description of Normandy, considerations about its climate, its people, their morals and habits, and the most common diseases that affect this province.
  Lépecq de la Clôture divided the entire province by region, according to the deposit of the mountains, the course of the rivers, the exposure, the elevation or the depression of the places. He described the character of the early Normans in comparison with the mores and customs of their descendants; the most general endemic diseases and those peculiar to each canton. He gave a brief account of the natural products found there, the nature of the common or mineral waters that flowed there, and the long series of epidemic diseases that were observed there.
  He made a description of the cantons of Rouen and Caen and obtained from his collaborators those of the canton of Évreux. He provided three life tables (Rouen, Lisieux and Évreux over 40 years) and made comparisons and reconciliations.
- The second part includes meteorological observations collected in Caen and Rouen during fifteen consecutive years.
- The third part presents the major constitutions of popular diseases in Caen from 1763 to 1768;
- The last part presents the diseases that reigned in the climate of Rouen from 1768 to 1777, and describes the various epidemics that occurred in Upper Normandy.
  "In addition to the epidemics of 1770 described in the first volume, he placed [in the last part] the catarrhal epidemic of the summer of 1763, the bilious putrid of 1764 and 1765, the milium that succeeded it, the atrabilious epidemic of 1766 and 1767, and the epidemic catarrh of 1767–1768 in the territory of Caen. The bilious epidemic of 1769, the catarrhal disease of 1770, the epidemic of Gros-Theil in the Roumois, the verminous and malignant putrid and exanthematous putrid of Louviers, the bilious catarrhal disease of 1771 and 1772, the putrid peripneumonia of 1775, the epidemic outbreak observed in Cottevrard, the influenza of 1775, the putrid catarrhal epidemic of Saint-Georges and the putrid peripneumonia of Dieppe in 1776; finally the putrid scorbutic epidemic of 1776 and 1777 in the canton of Rouen."
  The medical topography of the city of Rouen and that of the country of Caen are particularly noteworthy in this context.

In 1783, he established with precision the health consequences of the eruption of the Laki volcano on the population of Rouen with, in particular, a resurgence of "acute scurvy" and intermittent fevers. (Note: Inhaling sulfur dioxide gas causes victims to choke as their internal soft tissue swells – the gas reacts with the moisture in lungs and produces sulfurous acid.)

== Legacy ==
Rue Lepecq de la Clôture is named after him in Rouen, in the Gare-Jouvenet district (49.45008°N 1.09673°E).
