= University of Montpellier =

Public university in Montpellier, France

Coordinates: 43.598593°N 3.8921739°E

- Université de Montpellier
- Seal of the University of Montpellier
- Type: Public
- Established: 1220; 806 years ago
- Affiliations: Coimbra Group
- President: Philippe Augé
- Faculty: 1,900
- Students: 41,000
- Doctoral students: 1,700
- Location: Montpellier, France
- Campus: Urban/College town
- Website: umontpellier.fr

The University of Montpellier (French: Université de Montpellier; Occitan: Universitat de Montpelhièr) is a public research university located in Montpellier, in south-east of France. Established in 1220, the University of Montpellier is one of the oldest universities in the world.

The university was split into three universities (the University of Montpellier 1, the University of Montpellier 2 and the Paul Valéry University Montpellier 3) for 45 years in 1970. In 2015, it was reunified by the merger of the two former, with the latter, now named Paul Valéry University, Montpellier III, remaining a separate entity.

== History ==
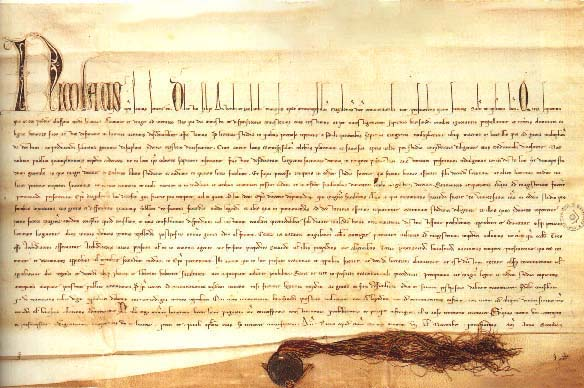
The Quia Sapientia bull in 1289 Pope Nicolas IV

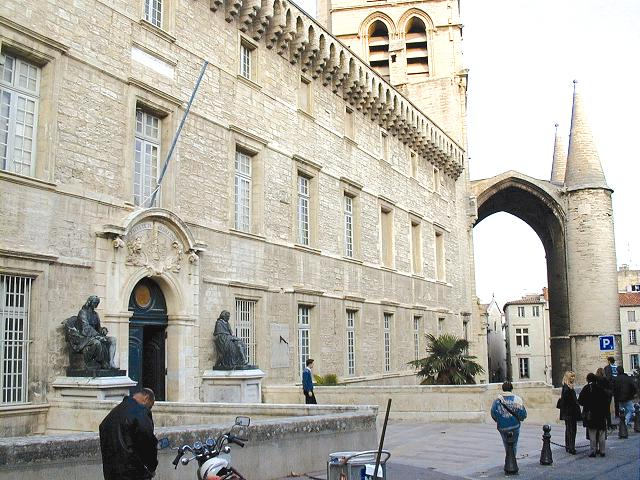
University of Montpellier, Faculty of Medicine, the world's oldest medical school still in operation.

The university is associated with a papal bull issued by Pope Nicholas IV in 1289, combining various centuries-old schools into a university. The university is considerably older than its formal founding date, with the first statutes given by Conrad of Urach in 1220.

It is not known exactly when the liberal arts schools that developed into the Montpellier School of Arts were founded; it may be that they were a direct continuation of the Gallo-Roman schools that gathered around masters of rhetoric. The School of Law was founded by Placentinus, from the School of Law at Bologna, who came to Montpellier in 1160, taught there during two different periods, and died there in 1192. The School of Law has had a long career—professors from Montpellier were prominent in the drafting of the Napoleonic Code, the civil code by which France is still guided and a foundation for modern law codes wherever Napoleonic influence extended. The School of Law was reorganized in 1998.

The School of Medicine was founded perhaps by people trained in the Muslim Spanish medical schools as Muslim rule in parts of Spain did not end until 1492, when the Emirate of Granada fell (no reference is available for the founding of the School of Medicine); it is certain that, as early as 1137, there were excellent physicians at Montpellier. It is the world's oldest medical school still in operation. The School of Medicine benefited from a policy of the Guilhem Lords of Montpellier, by which any licensed physician might lecture there: with no fixed limit to the number of teachers, lectures multiplied, thus providing a great choice of teachers coming from all around the Mediterranean region (Guilhem VIII act of January 1181). The statutes given in 1220 by Cardinal Conrad von Urach, legate of Pope Honorius III, which were confirmed and extended in 1240, placed this school under the direction of the Bishop of Maguelonne, but the school enjoyed a great deal of de facto autonomy.

The school was famous for arguing in the fourteenth century that the Black Death was caused by a miasma entering the opening of the body's pores, citing theories developed by Galen. Doctors educated at Montpellier advocated against bathing because they claimed bathing opened the body's pores, making one more susceptible to the bubonic plague.

In 1529, after some years as an apothecary, Nostradamus entered the University of Montpellier to study for a doctorate in medicine. He was expelled shortly afterwards when it was discovered that he had been an apothecary, a "manual trade" expressly banned by the university statutes. The expulsion document (BIU Montpellier, Register S 2 folio 87) still exists in the faculty library. Rabelais took his medical degree at Montpellier, and his portrait hangs among the gallery of professors.

The Jardin des Plantes de Montpellier, founded in 1593, is the oldest botanical garden in France. It was in this school that the biological theory of vitalism, elaborated by Barthez (1734–1806), had its origin. The French Revolution did not interrupt the existence of the School of Medicine. The Benedictine monastery that had been converted into the bishop's palace, was given to house the medical school in 1795. A gallery devoted to the portraits of professors since 1239 contains one of Rabelais.

The School of Theology had its origins in lectures in the convents: St. Anthony of Padua, Raymundus Lullus, and the Dominican Bernard of Trilia all lectured. Two letters of King John II prove that a School of Theology existed at Montpellier independently of the convents, in January 1350. By a Bull of 17 December 1421, Pope Martin V granted canonical institution to this faculty and united it closely with the faculty of law.

In the 16th century the local triumph of Calvinism interrupted the somewhat somnolent Catholic School of Theology, which was reinstated in 1622; but the rivalries of Dominicans and Jesuits interfered seriously with the prosperity of the faculty, which disappeared at the Revolution. In better days, among Montpellier's illustrious pupils of law were Petrarch, who spent four years at Montpellier, and among its lecturers were William of Nogaret, chancellor to Philip IV, Guillaume de Grimoard, afterwards Pope Urban V, and Pedro de Luna, afterwards antipope Benedict XIII.

Like all other provincial universities of France, that of Montpellier was suppressed at the outbreak of the French Revolution in 1793. The School of Science and the School of Letters were re-established in 1810; the School of Law in 1880. The University of Montpellier was officially re-organised in 1969, on the aftermath of May 1968 and the students' revolt all over the country. It was split into its successor institutions the University of Montpellier 1 (comprising the former schools of medicine, law, and economy), University of Montpellier 2 (science and technology) and University of Montpellier 3 (social sciences, humanities and liberal arts).

On 1 January 2015, the University of Montpellier 1 and the University of Montpellier 2 merged to form the newly recreated University of Montpellier. Meanwhile, the Paul Valéry University Montpellier 3, now only Paul Valéry, remains a separate institution.

== Campuses ==
The university is located on several sites in the city of Montpellier, line 1 of the tramway connects almost all of the different sites:

- to the south of the city, the Richter campus served by the Port-Marianne and Rives du Lez stations, houses the School of Economics, Montpellier Management, the Institute for the Preparation for General Administration of Montpellier (IPAG) and the Student House "Aimé-Schonenig";
- in the city center, served by the Louis Blanc and Place Albert 1er - Cathédrale stations, are located: the School of Law & Political Science, the historic building of the School of Medicine, the botanical garden, the Institute of Biology housing medical and administrative services of the university, the administrative buildings located on Henri IV avenue and the presidency of the university located on Auguste-Broussonnet street in the former Institute of Botany;
- the Stade Philippidès station serves the Faculty of Education located on Marcel-Godechot square as well as the Stade Philippidès owned by the university;
- further north, in the district of Boutonnet, is located the School of Pharmacy on a 4-hectare campus at the crossroads of the Voie Domitienne and the Charles-Flahault avenue, the site is served by the Boutonnet stop;
- further north, the large Triolet campus with an area of 30 hectares and served by the Universités des Sciences et des Lettres station, houses the School of Sciences, the IAE, the ENSCM and Polytech Montpellier;
- to the north of the city, in the hospital district, the Occitanie station serves the IUT of Montpellier located in a 9-hectare campus (Occitanie avenue), the Medical Pedagogical Unit (UPM) and the new campus of the School of Medicine near the Arnaud de Villeneuve hospital, the UFR STAPS located in the Veyrassi area (Pic-Saint-Loup avenue), as well as numerous buildings housing research laboratories (University Institute for Clinical Research, Institute of Functional Genomics, Institute of Human Genetics, etc.);
- the Saint-Priest campus (Saint-Priest street, Ada street, Galéra street), served by the Château d'Ô tramway station, houses many scientific research laboratories of the School of Sciences (Institute of Electronics and Systems, Laboratory of Computer science, Robotics and Microelectronics of Montpellier, Laboratory of Mechanics and Civil Engineering, etc.);
- in the very north of Montpellier in the Euromédecine district, the Hauts de Massane station serves the School of Odontology (Docteur-Jean-Louis-Viala avenue).

The university also has many antennas/branches in the rest of the region:

- in Nîmes: the IUT of Nîmes (Saint-Césaire district), a branch of the School of Medicine (Carémeau district) and a branch of the School of Education;
- in Béziers: the IUT of Béziers;
- in Sète: a branch of the Montpellier IUT;
- in Perpignan: a branch of the School of Education;
- in Carcassonne: a branch of the School of Education;
- in Mende: a branch of the School of Education;
- in Albaret-Sainte-Marie (Lozère): an ISEM branch.

== Organisation and governance ==
The University of Montpellier has 17 components:

- 10 schools (8 Facultés and 2 schools),
- 7 institutes,
- and 1 constituent college (ENSCM).

The university is administered by:

- the Board of Directors;
- the Academic Council, composed of 80 elected members divided into 2 commissions of 40 members each (the research commission and the education and university life commission);
- the Technical Committee;
- the Joint School Committee;
- the Health, Safety and Working Conditions Committee.

== Academic profile ==
=== Admissions ===
In 2019, the University of Montpellier received 50,069 candidatures for admission in one of the 6961 available places in its bachelor's programmes, which accounts for 7.19 candidates per place.

=== Rankings and reputation ===
University rankings

Global – Overall
- ARWU World: 151–200 (2026)
- CWUR World: 177 (2025)
- CWTS World: 207 (2025)
- QS World: 473 (2027)
- THE World: 401-500 (2026)
- USNWR Global: 259 (2026)

The University of Montpellier secured 55th and 16th places in the world and Europe, respectively, in Reuters - The World's Most Innovative Universities 2018. It is also ranked among the top 200 universities in the Academic Ranking of World Universities 2026. In the Times Higher Education Impact Rankings 2022 it was ranked in the top 200 universities, coming first in France. Furthermore, it was ranked 98th best university in the world and best French university outside Paris according to the less known University Ranking by Academic Performance 2021–2022. According to the Performance Ranking of Scientific Papers for World Universities, or NTU Ranking, it placed 137th in the world for 2022.

=== Affiliations and memberships ===
The University of Montpellier is a member of Coimbra Group and of the Mediterranean Universities Union. It is also a founding member of the European University alliance CHARM-EU.

On 19 June 2024, the University of Montpellier has been accepted as a member of the Udice Group.

== Student life ==
Student life within the University of Montpellier is coordinated by:

- the Student Life Office (SLO), a body run by students for students;
- two student centres (MdE) and the (S)pace, located on the Richter and Triolet campuses;
- around 140 associations active in humanitarian commitment, sports, culture, etc.

== Notable people ==
=== Academics ===
- Jean-Antoine Chaptal, chair of mathematics chair from 1789
- Jean Astruc, chair of anatomy from 1706
- François Boissier de Sauvages de Lacroix, chair of botany from 1740
- Antoine Gouan, chair of botany from 1765
- Pierre Magnol, professor of botany and director of the Royal Botanic Garden from 1694
- Alexander Grothendieck, Fields Medal 1966, professor of mathematics from 1973 to 1988

=== Alumni ===
- Auguste Comte, French philosopher
- Francesco Petrarca, Italian scholar and poet in Renaissance Italy, widely considered to be the founder of Humanism
- Amalricus Augerii, 14th-century church-historian
- François Rabelais, humanist writer
- Jeanne Ferrier, French physicist, pioneer in radiotherapy
- Alexander Grothendieck, 20th-century mathematician, Fields Medal winner
- Enver Hoxha, communist dictator of Albania from 1944 until his death in 1985
- Taha Hussein, was one of the most influential 20th-century Egyptian writers
- Ali Abu el-Fotoh, was one of the most influential 19th-century Egyptian economists
- Albert Zafy, president of Madagascar 1993–96
- Khieu Samphan, head of state of Cambodia under Pol Pot's Khmer Rouge regime
- Nostradamus, a French apothecary and reputed seer, who is best known for his book Les Propheties
- Raja Rao, one of three primary Indian Writers in English, awarded the Neustadt Prize in 1988
- Adamantios Korais, a Greek scholar and a major figure in the Greek Enlightenment
- Sahle-Work Zewde, is an Ethiopian politician and diplomat who is the current president of Ethiopia, the first woman to hold the office
- Mohed Altrad, a Syrian-born French billionaire businessman, rugby chairman and writer
- Andreas Vesalius, Wrote the "Corporis Fabrica Libri Septem", the first Medical Anatomy book based on human anatomy rather than animal anatomy.
- Edward Adam, a 19th-century chemist who invented methods to improve the distillation of liquor.
- Li Jieren, noted 20th-century Chinese author and translator, studied literature at Montpellier, 1922–1924.
- Shi Zhengli, virologist and director of the Center for Emerging Infectious Diseases, Wuhan Institute of Virology, Chinese Academy of Sciences.
- Chrysos Evelpidis, Minister of Agriculture and Minister of Finance of Greece

== See also ==
- Montpellier vitalism
- Medieval university
- List of medieval universities
- List of oldest universities in continuous operation
- List of public universities in France by academy
- List of split up universities
