= Saint-Nicolas-du-Bosc =

- Part of Le Bosc-du-Theil
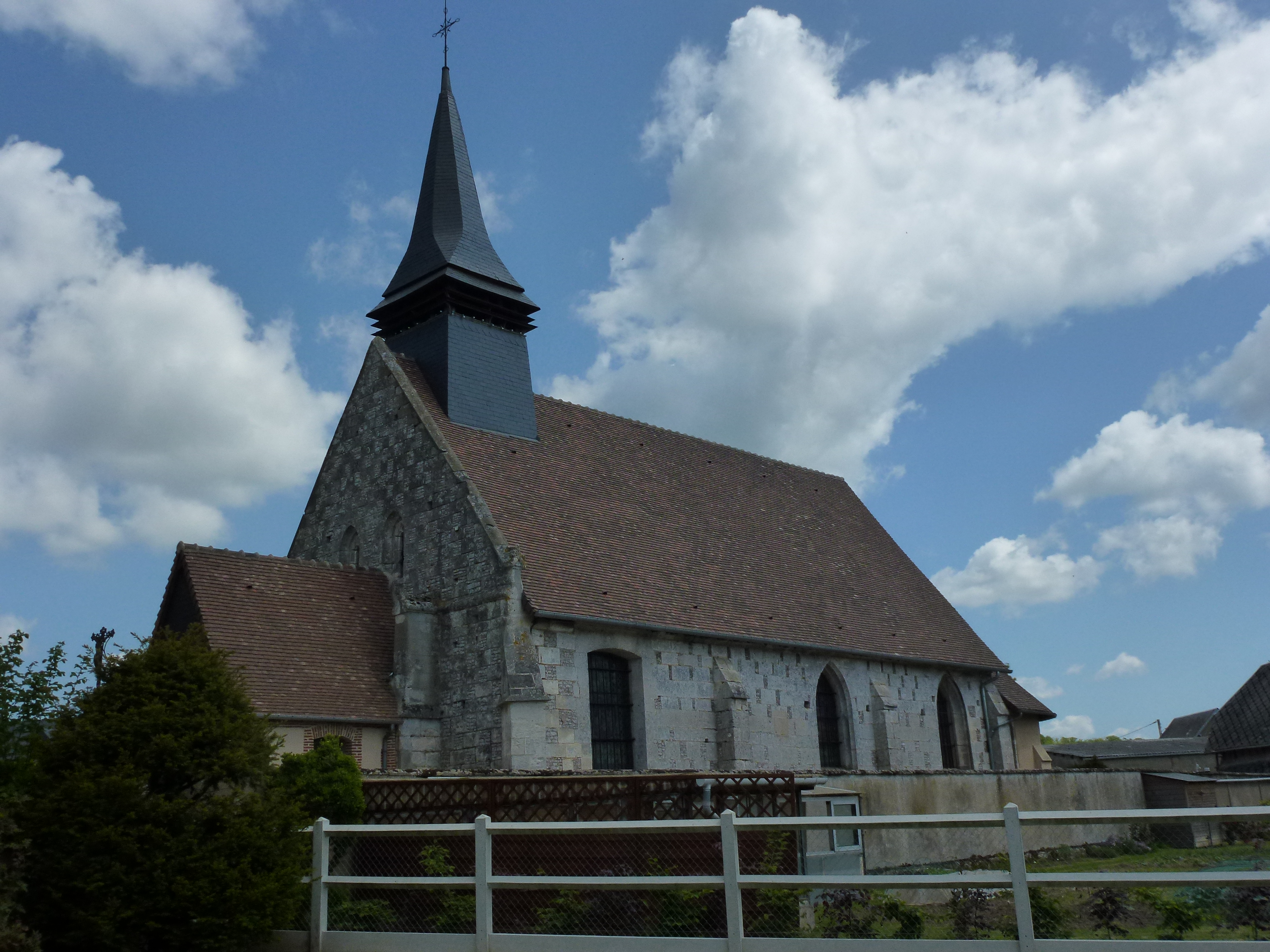
- Location of Saint-Nicolas-du-Bosc
- Location within France Location within Normandy
- Coordinates: 49°12′44″N 0°52′11″E
- Country: France
- Region: Normandy
- Department: Eure
- Arrondissement: Bernay
- Canton: Le Neubourg
- Commune: Le Bosc-du-Theil
- Area^{1}: 9.24 km^{2} (3.57 sq mi)
- Elevation: 160 m (520 ft)
- Highest elevation: 155 m (509 ft)
- Lowest elevation: 102 m (335 ft)
- Population (2019): 297
  - Density: 32.1/km^{2} (83.2/sq mi)
- Time zone: UTC+01:00 (CET)
  - Summer (DST): UTC+02:00 (CEST)
- Postal code: 27370
- ^{1} French Land Register data, which excludes lakes, ponds, glaciers > 1 km^{2} (0.386 sq mi or 247 acres) and river estuaries.

Saint-Nicolas-du-Bosc is a former commune in the Eure department in Normandy in northern France. On 1 January 2016, it was merged into the new commune of Le Bosc-du-Theil.

== See also ==
- Communes of the Eure department
