= Montpellier vitalism =

Medical and philosophical school of thought

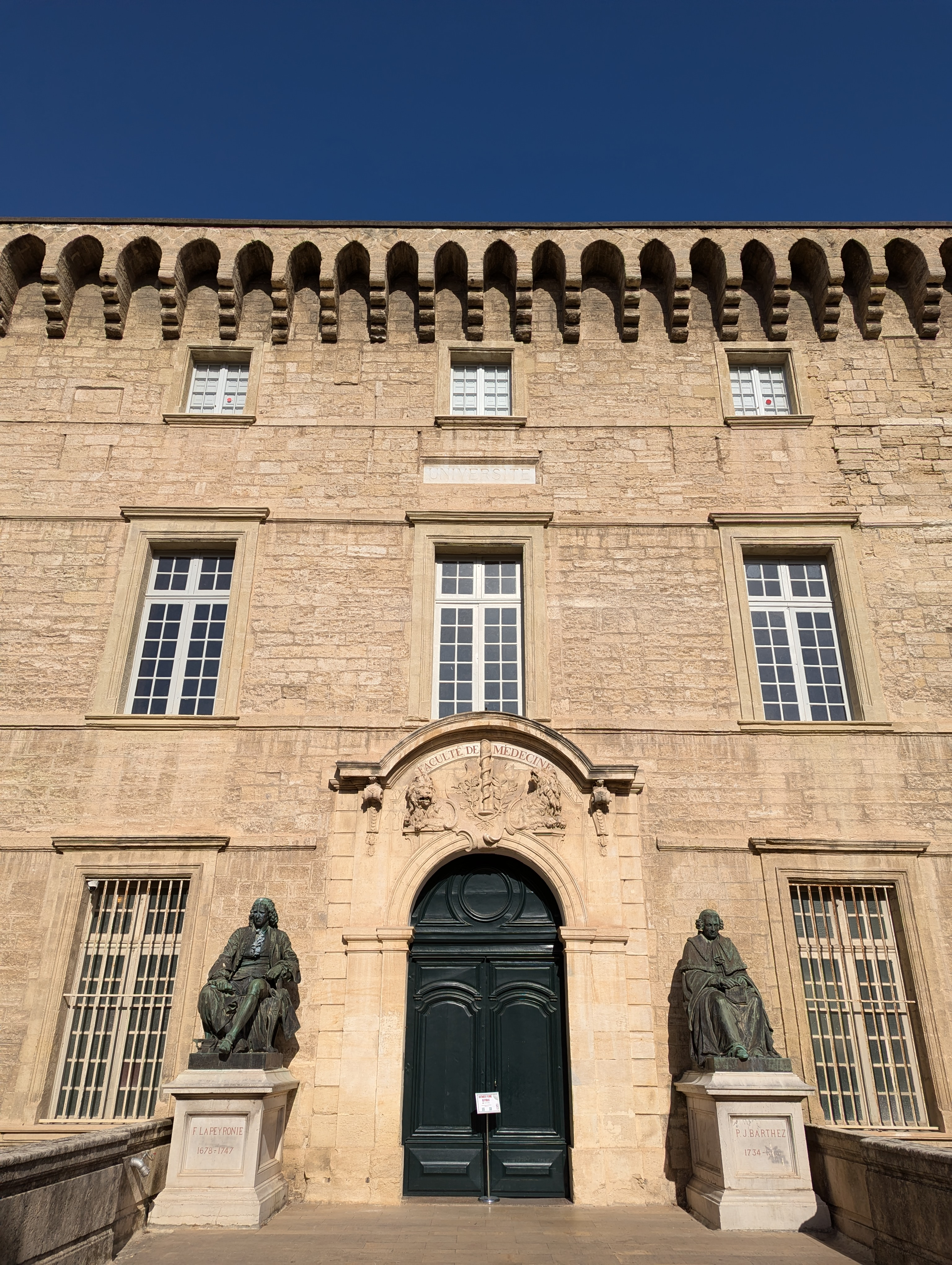
Historic building of the Montpellier Faculty of Medicine.

The vitalism of the Montpellier medical school, more succinctly called "Montpellier vitalism", is a medical and philosophical school of thought.

== History ==
It emerged in France in the second half of the 18th century under the influence of physicians and philosophers shaped by the intellectual context of the time. Disease was interpreted in an original way as a dysfunction of the entire organism, compromising its integrity. This medical philosophy persisted for over a century and found fertile ground at the University of Montpellier, an institution renowned for its openness to philosophical ideas.

The term "vitalism" arose in the wake of the Montpellier school of medicine, in the south of France, and was notably introduced by Charles-Louis Dumas, dean of the city's Faculty of Medicine, in his Principes de Physiologie in 1800. The vitalism of this school viewed living organisms as indivisible units animated by a "vital principle" that could not be reduced to the physical activity of organs, though it was also distinct from the thinking soul. It positioned itself as an intermediate stance between the mechanistic perspective of the early 18th century and the animist vitalism attributed to Stahl, as well as between materialism and spiritualism.

By the late 18th century, the Montpellier school enjoyed significant prestige in France and entered into rivalry with the Paris school, which was more materialist and advocated an "organicist" approach to medicine, focused on the study of organs.

== See also ==
- Vitalism
- University of Montpellier
- Paul Joseph Barthez
- Théophile de Bordeu
- Xavier Bichat

== Sources ==
- Le Blanc, Guillaume (2004). "Le vitalisme (École de Montpellier)", in D. Lecourt (dir.), Dictionnaire de la pensée médicale. Paris: Presses Universitaires de France, pp. 1208–1211 (in French).
- Malaterre, Christophe (2007). "Le "néo-vitalisme" au XIXe siècle : une seconde école française de l'émergence". Bulletin d'histoire et d'épistémologie des sciences de la vie. 14: 25–45. Full text (in French).
- Rey, Roselyne (2000). Naissance et développement du vitalisme en France de la fin du XVIIe siècle à la fin du XVIIIe siècle. Oxford: University of Oxford, Voltaire Foundation (in French, first ed. 1987).
- Williams, Elisabeth Ann (2003). A Cultural History of Medical Vitalism in Enlightenment Montpellier. Farnham: Ashgat.
