= Saint-Pierre-Azif =

- Commune
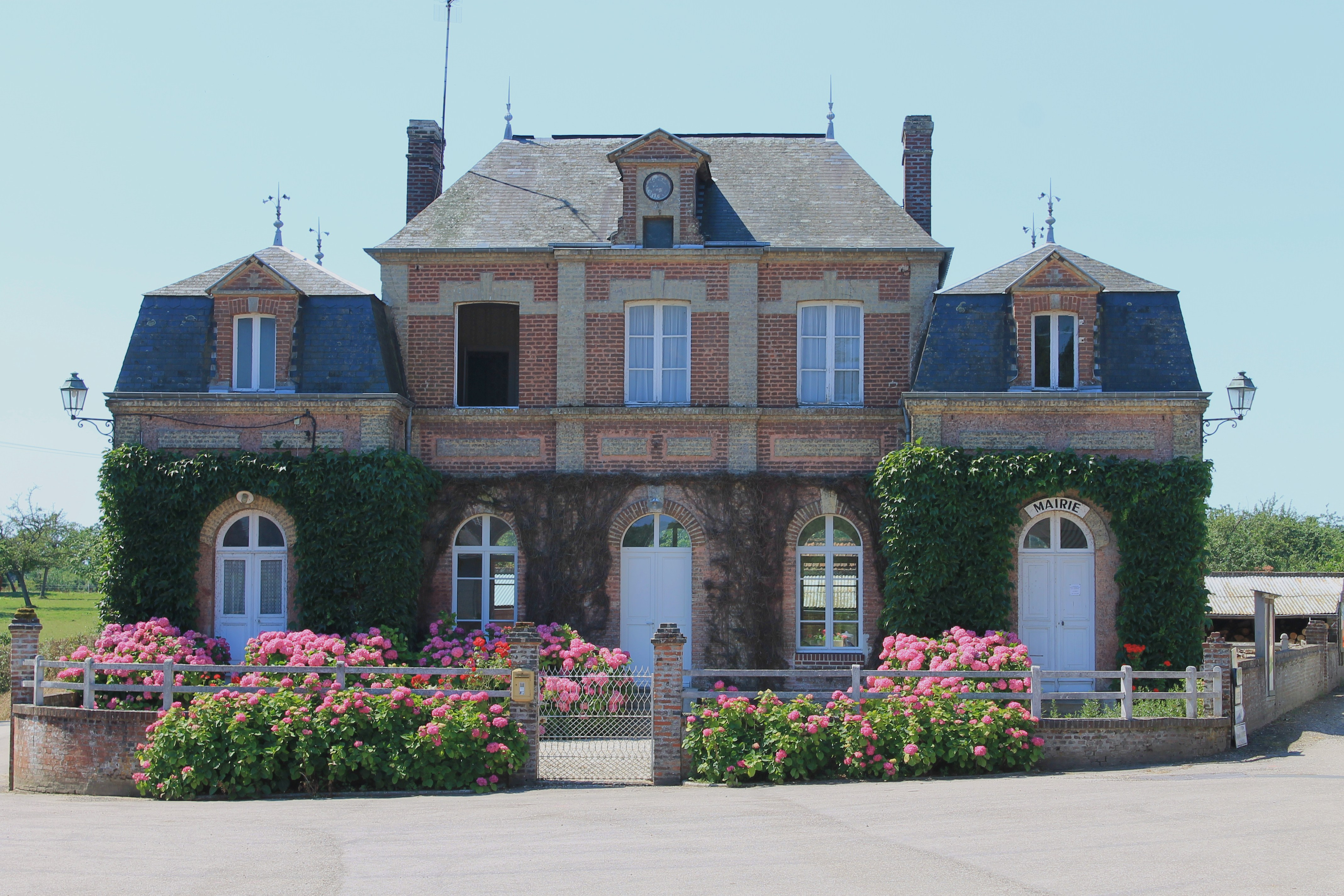
- The town hall in Saint-Pierre-Azif
- Location of Saint-Pierre-Azif
- Location within France Location within Normandy
- Coordinates: 49°17′45″N 0°02′35″E
- Country: France
- Region: Normandy
- Department: Calvados
- Arrondissement: Lisieux
- Canton: Pont-l'Évêque
- Intercommunality: CC Cœur Côte Fleurie

Government
  - Mayor (2020–2026): Françoise Lefranc
- Area^{1}: 6.17 km^{2} (2.38 sq mi)
- Elevation: 81 m (266 ft)
- Highest elevation: 139 m (456 ft)
- Lowest elevation: 40 m (130 ft)
- Population (2023): 163
  - Density: 26.4/km^{2} (68.4/sq mi)
- Time zone: UTC+01:00 (CET)
  - Summer (DST): UTC+02:00 (CEST)
- INSEE/Postal code: 14645 /14950
- ^{1} French Land Register data, which excludes lakes, ponds, glaciers > 1 km^{2} (0.386 sq mi or 247 acres) and river estuaries.

Saint-Pierre-Azif (French pronunciation: [sɛ̃ pjɛʁ azif]) is a commune in the Calvados department in the Normandy region in northwestern France.

== Population ==
Historical population
Year	Pop.	±% p.a.
1968	176	—
1975	145	−2.73%
1982	145	+0.00%
1990	158	+1.08%
1999	153	−0.36%
2007	152	−0.08%
2012	183	+3.78%
2017	164	−2.17%
2023	163	−0.10%
Source: INSEE

== Personality ==
- the doctor Louis Lépecq de La Clôture retired to his family home and died there on 5 November 1804.

== See also ==
- Communes of the Calvados department
