= Le Bosc-du-Theil =

- Commune
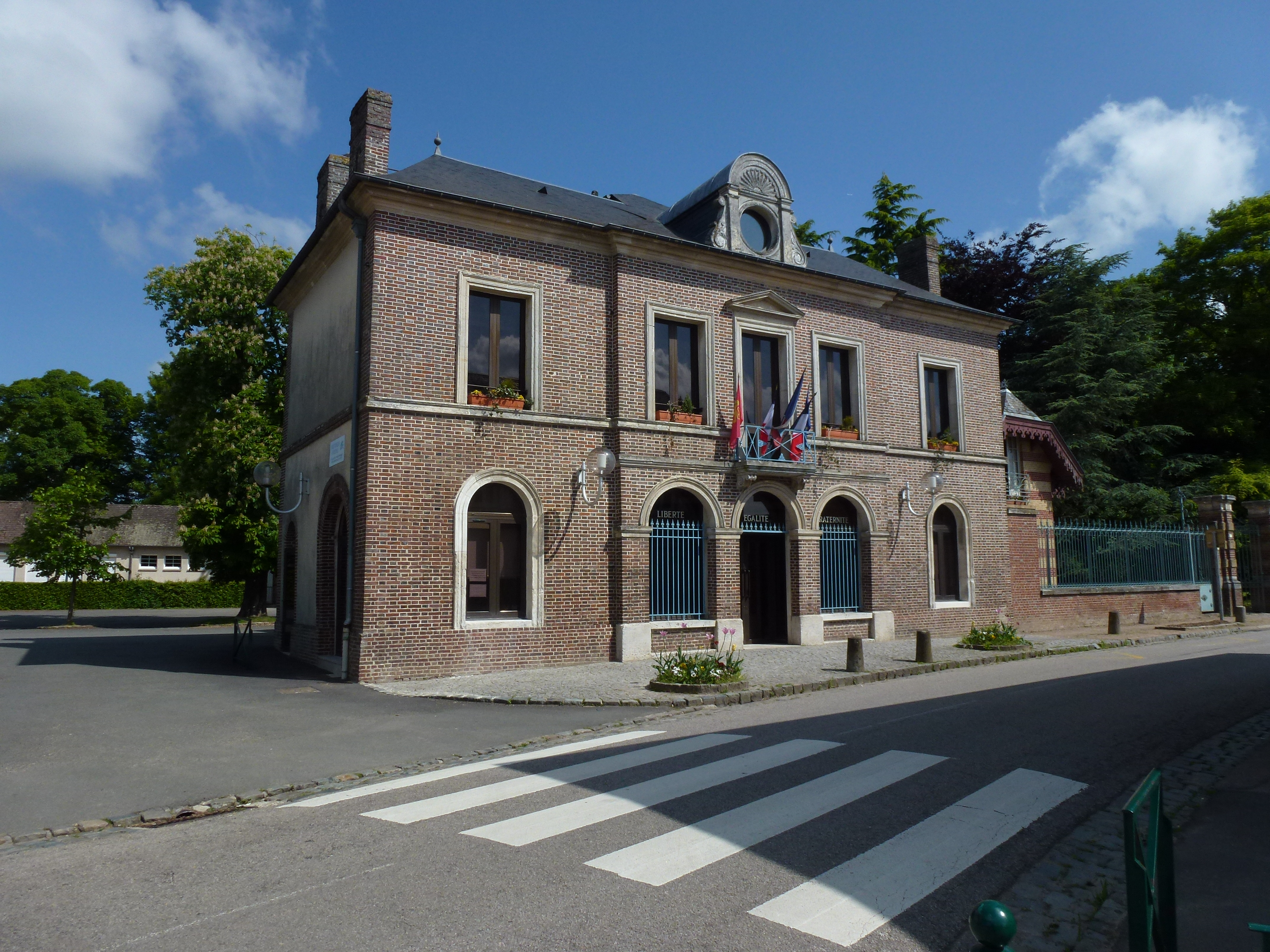
- The town hall in Le Gros-Theil
- Location of Le Bosc-du-Theil
- Location within France Location within Normandy
- Coordinates: 49°13′34″N 0°50′31″E
- Country: France
- Region: Normandy
- Department: Eure
- Arrondissement: Bernay
- Canton: Le Neubourg
- Area^{1}: 20.11 km^{2} (7.76 sq mi)
- Population (2023): 1,310
  - Density: 65.1/km^{2} (169/sq mi)
- Time zone: UTC+01:00 (CET)
  - Summer (DST): UTC+02:00 (CEST)
- INSEE/Postal code: 27302 /27370
- ^{1} French Land Register data, which excludes lakes, ponds, glaciers > 1 km^{2} (0.386 sq mi or 247 acres) and river estuaries.

Le Bosc-du-Theil is a commune in the department of Eure, northern France. The municipality was established on 1 January 2016 by merger of the former communes of Le Gros-Theil and Saint-Nicolas-du-Bosc.

== See also ==
- Communes of the Eure department
