= Amalricus Augerii =

Amalricus Augerii was a church-historian of the fourteenth century, and member of the Augustinian Order. He was a doctor of the University of Montpellier, prior of a monastery of his Order, and chaplain to Urban V, 1362. His chief work is the "Actus Rom. Pontificum", extending in alphabetical order from St. Peter to the year 1321, and edited, chronologically, in Eccard, "Script. medii ævi", II, 1641–1824.
