= Izeste =

- Commune
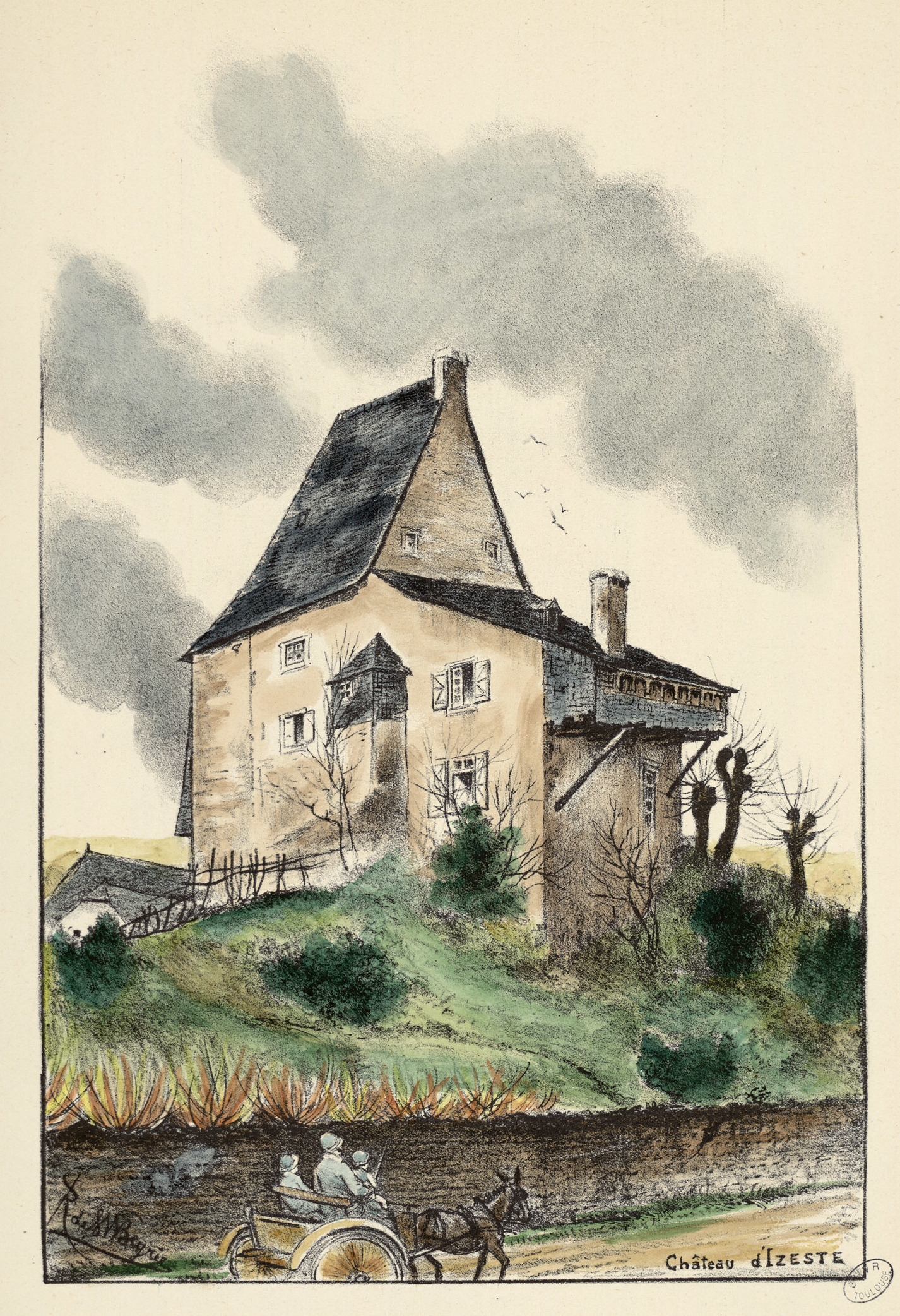
- The chateau of Izeste
- Location of Izeste
- Location within France Location within Nouvelle-Aquitaine
- Coordinates: 43°05′34″N 0°25′29″W
- Country: France
- Region: Nouvelle-Aquitaine
- Department: Pyrénées-Atlantiques
- Arrondissement: Oloron-Sainte-Marie
- Canton: Oloron-Sainte-Marie-2
- Intercommunality: Vallée d'Ossau

Government
  - Mayor (2020–2026): Daniel Carrey
- Area^{1}: 6.84 km^{2} (2.64 sq mi)
- Elevation: 421 m (1,381 ft)
- Highest elevation: 1,368 m (4,488 ft)
- Lowest elevation: 411 m (1,348 ft)
- Population (2023): 442
  - Density: 64.6/km^{2} (167/sq mi)
- Time zone: UTC+01:00 (CET)
  - Summer (DST): UTC+02:00 (CEST)
- INSEE/Postal code: 64280 /64260
- ^{1} French Land Register data, which excludes lakes, ponds, glaciers > 1 km^{2} (0.386 sq mi or 247 acres) and river estuaries.

Izeste (French pronunciation: [izɛst]; Occitan: Isesta) is a commune in the Pyrénées-Atlantiques department and Nouvelle-Aquitaine region of south-western France.

Its inhabitants are called Isestois.

== Notable people ==
- Théophile de Bordeu (born in Izeste in 1722; died in Bagnères-de-Bigorre in 1776, was a doctor to Louis XV and a character in Le Rêve de d'Alembert by Diderot.

== See also ==
- Ossau Valley
- Communes of the Pyrénées-Atlantiques department
