= University of Montpellier 1 =

University in Montpellier, France (1970–2015)

Montpellier 1 University
- Université Montpellier 1
- Logo of Montpellier 1 University
- Type: Public
- Active: 1970–2015
- President: Philipe Augé
- Faculty: 958
- Administrative staff: 692
- Students: 21,226
- Location: Montpellier, France; 43°37′20″N 3°51′42″E
- Campus: Urban
- Sporting affiliations: Montpellier Universite Club (M.U.C.)
- Website: www.univ-montp1.fr

The Montpellier 1 University (Université Montpellier 1) was a French university, in the Academy of Montpellier. It was one of the three successor universities to the University of Montpellier following the split in 1970. In January 2015, Montpellier 2 University and Montpellier 1 University merged again to form the University of Montpellier.

== See also ==
- University of Montpellier
- List of public universities in France by academy
- List of split up universities
