= Le Gros-Theil =

- Part of Le Bosc-du-Theil
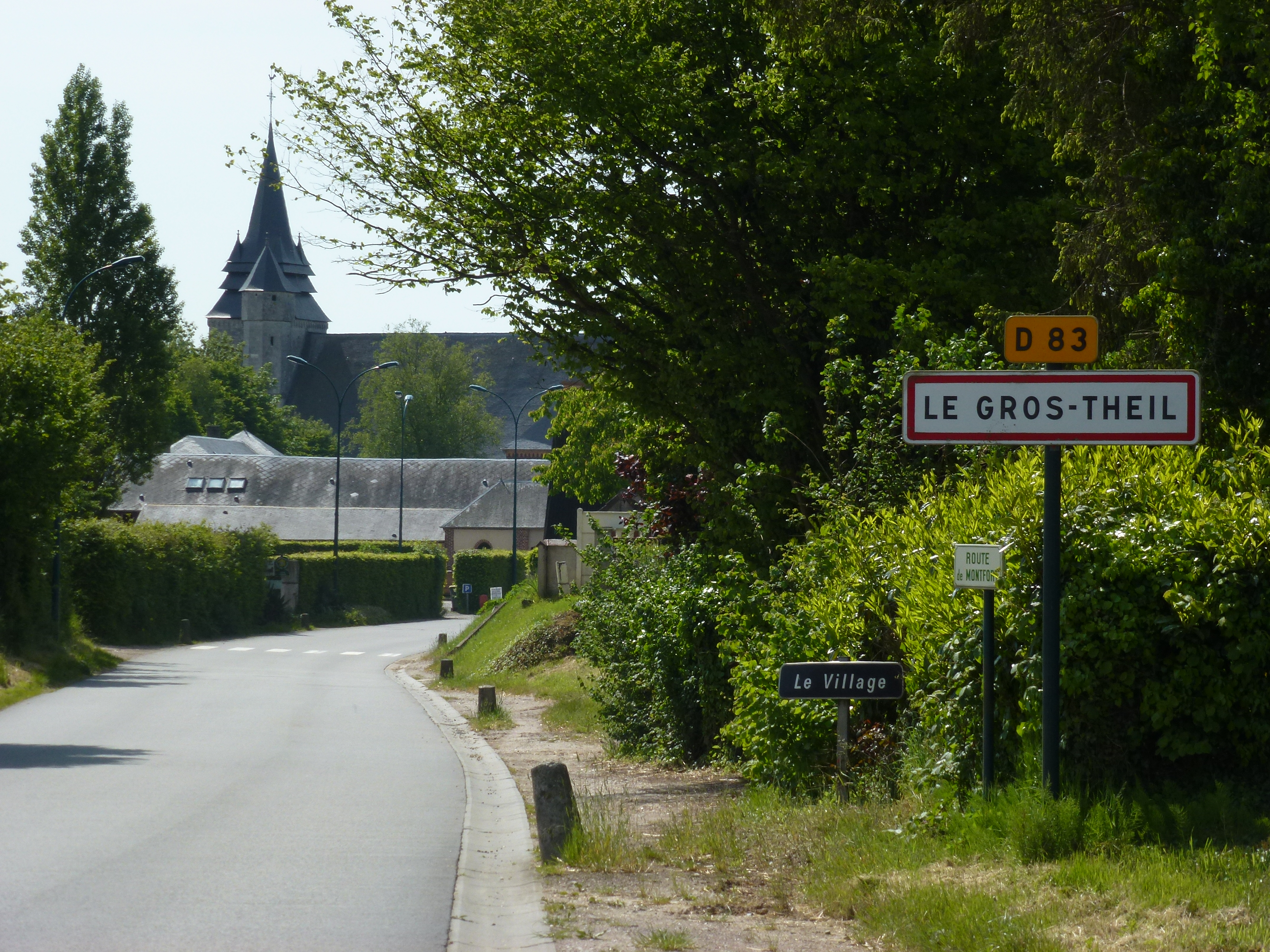

- Coat of arms
- Location of Le Gros-Theil
- Location within France Location within Normandy
- Coordinates: 49°13′38″N 0°50′34″E
- Country: France
- Region: Normandy
- Department: Eure
- Arrondissement: Bernay
- Canton: Le Neubourg
- Commune: Le Bosc-du-Theil
- Area^{1}: 10.87 km^{2} (4.20 sq mi)
- Elevation: 140 m (460 ft)
- Highest elevation: 159 m (522 ft)
- Lowest elevation: 134 m (440 ft)
- Population (2019): 1,008
  - Density: 92.73/km^{2} (240.2/sq mi)
- Time zone: UTC+01:00 (CET)
  - Summer (DST): UTC+02:00 (CEST)
- Postal code: 27370
- ^{1} French Land Register data, which excludes lakes, ponds, glaciers > 1 km^{2} (0.386 sq mi or 247 acres) and river estuaries.

Le Gros-Theil is a former commune in the Eure department in northern France. On 1 January 2016, it was merged into the new commune of Le Bosc-du-Theil.

== Population ==
Historical population
Year	Pop.	±% p.a.
1962	501	—
1968	528	+0.88%
1975	580	+1.35%
1982	805	+4.79%
1990	925	+1.75%
1999	827	−1.24%
2006	880	+0.89%
2019	1,008	+1.05%
Source: EHESS and INSEE

== See also ==
- Communes of the Eure department
