= Théophile de Bordeu =

French physician (1722–1776)

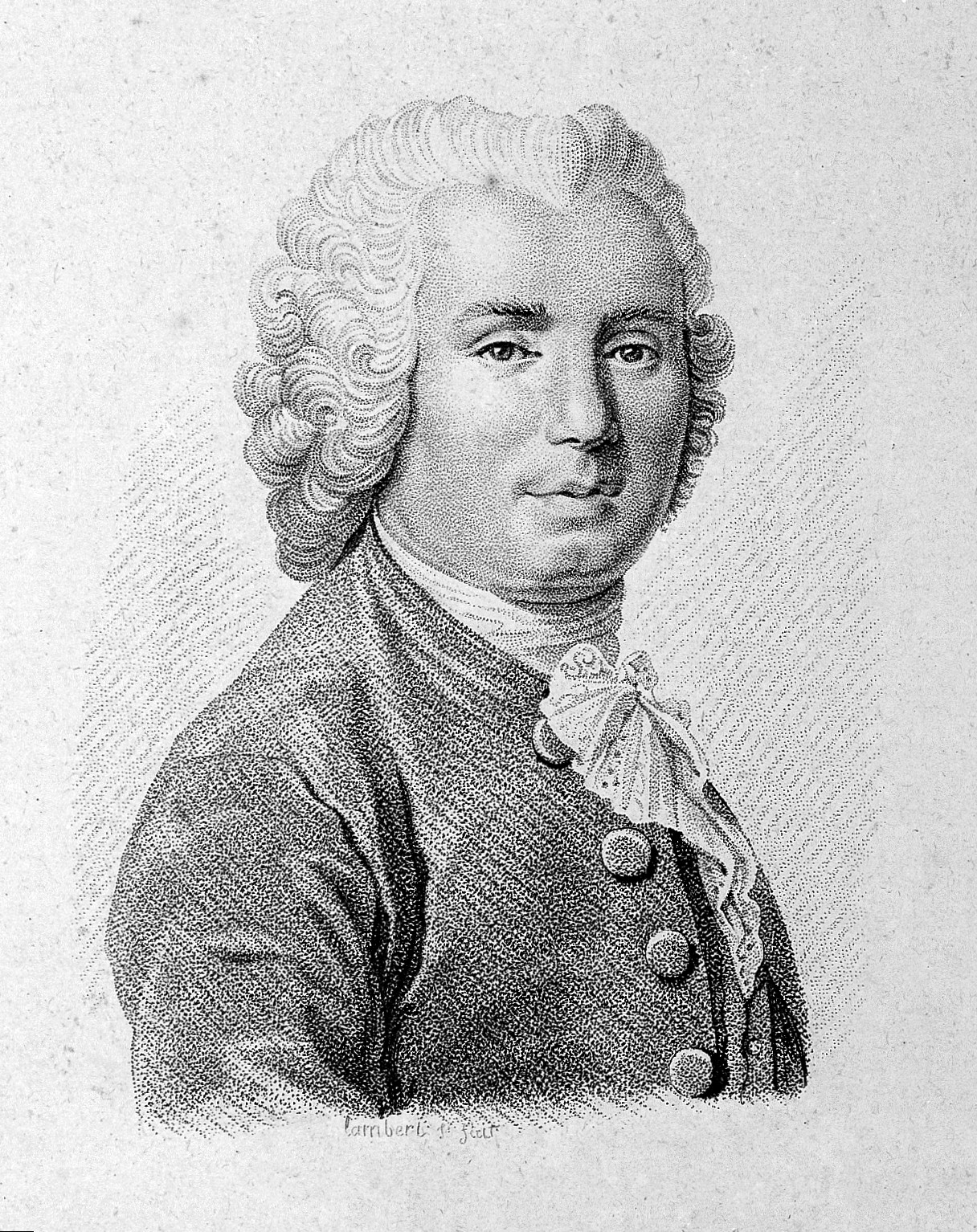
- Born: 22 February 1722; Izeste
- Died: 23 November 1776 (aged 54); Bagnères-de-Bigorre
- Occupations: Physician; Encyclopédiste

Théophile de Bordeu (22 February 1722 – 23 November 1776) was a French physician.

Bordeu was an early advocate of vitalism, especially the Montpellier vitalism. His pupils included Louis Lépecq de La Clôture.

== Works and publications ==
- 1754: Aquitaniae minerales aquae, Paris, Quillau, 1754.
- Correspondance, Montpellier, Centre national de la recherche scientifique, 1977–1979
- 1774: Hommage à la vallée d'Ossau,
- 1757: L’usage des eaux de Barèges et du mercure, pour les écrouelles : ou dissertation sur les tumeurs scrophuleuses, Paris, Debure,
- Lettres contenant des essais sur l’histoire des eaux minérales du Béarn sur leur nature, différence, proprieté; sur les maladies ausquelles elles conviennent, & sur la façon dont on doit s’en servir.
- 1746: Lettres contenant des essais sur l'histoire des eaux minérales du Béarn et de quelques-unes des provinces voisines, Amsterdam, Poppé libraires; second edition reworked and augmented in 1748.
- Lettres inédites, Bordeaux, Bière, 1960
- 1761: Nouvelles observations sur le pouls intermittent : qui indique l’usage des purgatifs, Paris, Vincent,
- 1818: Œuvres complètes précédées d’une notice sur sa vie et sur ses ouvrages, Paris, Caille,
- 1769: Précis d’observations sur les eaux de Barèges et les autres eaux minérales du Bigorre et du Béarn, Paris,
- 1751: Recherches anatomiques sur la position des glandes et sur leur action, Paris, Quillau,
- 1755: Recherches anatomiques sur les articulations des os de la face, Paris, Imprimerie Royale,
- Recherches sur l’histoire de la médecine, Paris, G. Masson, 1882
- 1779–1786: Recherches sur le pouls par rapport aux crises contenant les décisions de plusieurs savans médecins sur la doctrine du pouls; ... on y a joint une dissertation nouvelle sur les sueurs critiques & leurs pouls, Paris, P. Fr. Didot jeune,
- 1772: Recherches sur le pouls par rapport aux crises, Paris, Didot, jeune,
- 1767: Recherches sur le tissu muqueux : ou, L’organe cellulaire, et sur quelques maladies de la poitrine, Paris, Didot le jeune,
- 1790: Recherches sur le tissu muqueux, ou l’organe cellulaire, et sur quelques maladies de la poitrine, Paris, Didot le jeune,
- Recherches sur les maladies chroniques : leurs rapports avec les maladies aiguës, leurs périodes, leur nature, et sur la manière dont on les traite aux eaux minérales de Barèges, et des autres sources de l’Aquitaine, Paris, Gabon : J.A.
- 1764: Recherches sur quelques points d’histoire de la medecine : qui peuvent avoir rapport à l’arrêt de la Grand’ Chambre du Parlement de Paris, concernant l’inoculation, et qui paroissent favorables à la tolérance de cette opération, Liège,
- 1764: Recherches sur quelques points d’histoire de la médicine qui peuvent avoir rapport à l’arrêt de la grand’ chambre du Parlement de Paris, concernant l’inoculation, et qui paroissent favorables à la tolérance de cette opération.., Paris, Rémont,
- 1774: Traité de médecine théorique & pratique, Paris, Ruault.
