= Montpellier 2 University =

Former French university

Coordinates: 43°37′55″N 3°51′50″E

- Université Montpellier 2
- Type: Public
- Active: 1970–2015
- Affiliations: ASAIHL
- President: Michel Robert
- Academic staff: 2,564
- Students: 16,224
- Doctoral students: 1,000
- Location: place Eugène Bataillon 34095 Montpellier Cedex 5 France, Montpellier, Hérault, France
- Campus: Montpellier, Nîmes, Béziers, Sète, Mende, Carcassonne, Perpignan
- Website: http://www.english.univ-montp2.fr/

Montpellier 2 University (Université Montpellier 2) was a French university in the académie of Montpellier. It was one of the three universities formed in 1970 from the original University of Montpellier. In January 2015, Montpellier 1 University and Montpellier 2 University merged to form the University of Montpellier.

== History ==
The creation of the imperial University by Napoleon I in 1808 stimulated the formation of a number of faculties of Humanities and of Science in the main cities of the French Empire.

At that time, Montpellier had already a long-established medical college and a school of Pharmacy, but also a respected Royal Society of Sciences created in 1706. In 1810, a Faculty of Science started with initially seven chairs: mathematics, astronomy, physics, chemistry, zoology, botany, and mineralogy.

In 1879, the faculty created a research station of marine biology in Sète, and, twelve years later, and Institute of Botany (which is still part of University Montpellier 2). The Institute of Chemistry, created in the same period, became the Ecole Nationale Supérieure of Chemistry of Montpellier in 1941.

In 1964, the faculty left the centre of Montpellier to settle in a 30 hectare campus to the north of the city on which 146 000 m^{2} of buildings for teaching and research were built.

== Heritage ==
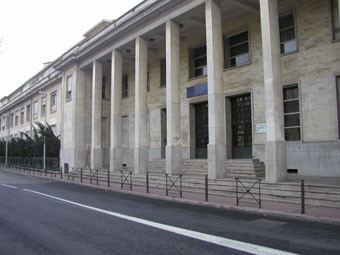
Institute of Botany of Montpellier

The University Montpellier 2 retains the Institute of Botany of Montpellier (created in 1889 by Professor Charles Flahault), which is close to the botanical garden of University Montpellier 1. Partly demolished after World War II, most of the buildings date from 1956. The building houses a prestigious herbarium, the largest in France after the national museum of natural history, with approximately 4 million samples and an important collection of botany vellums, and research laboratories in the fields of ecology and parasitology. The station of marine biology in Sète has been part of the university since 1879.

In addition to these collections, the university's media library brings together its old collections of printed works, manuscripts, and iconography (including, for example, the library of the work of Felix Dunal, bequeathed to the Faculty of Science in 1856). These collections are publicly accessible given a reasonable request.

The university is also the seat of the Pôle universitaire de Montpellier which collectively represents the higher education establishments in the Languedoc-Roussillon region.

== Overview of University Montpellier 2 ==
Université Montpellier 2 is a research-intensive university where education and research cover most of the Scientific and Technological fields:

- Biodiversity, Ecology, Evolution, Environment
- Biology, Agronomy
- Biology and Health
- Chemistry
- Education
- Management
- Mathematics, Informatics, Physics and Systems
- Universe, Earth, Water

It is partnered with 40 joint research units, 1 observatory and divided into 7 specialised faculties.

== Education ==
The university curriculum follows the LMD system, which divides higher education into 3 diplomas: Licence (Bachelor's degree, 3 years of Higher Education) Master (Master's degree, 2 years after bachelor's degree) Doctorat (PhD, 3 years after master's degree)

The university is divided into 7 specialised faculties:

- (in French) The Faculty of Science
- The École polytechnique universitaire de Montpellier
- 3 University Institutes of Technology (IUT)
  - IUT Montpellier-Sète
  - (in French) IUT Nîmes
  - (in French) IUT Béziers
- The Montpellier School of Management (IAE) (belongs to a Institut d'Administration des Entreprises IAEs network of 31 IAEs throughout France)
- The Faculty of Education

And 6 doctoral schools.

== Research ==
Université Montpellier 2 is composed of about forty research departments in:

- Biodiversity, Ecology, Evolution, Environment
- Biology, Agronomy
- Biology and Health
- Chemistry
- Education
- Management
- Mathematics, Informatics, Physics and Systems
- Universe, Earth, Water

The whole research activity is carried out collaboratively with the leading national research organisations (CNRS, Inserm INSERM, Institut national de la recherche agronomique INRA, Cirad CIRAD, Ird IRD, Brgm, CEA, CNES, Ifremer, Inria, Irstea).

== Rankings ==
- 2014 QS world university rankings
  - 51 – 100th for the Earth and Marine Sciences field
  - 101 – 150th for the Agriculture & Forestry field
  - 385th worldwide
- 2013 Academic Ranking of World Universities: 201 – 300th worldwide
- Times Higher Education under 50 universities: 32nd worldwide
- National Taiwan university: 294th worldwide

== See also ==
- University of Montpellier
- List of public universities in France by academy
