= Paul Joseph Barthez =

French physician (1734–1806)

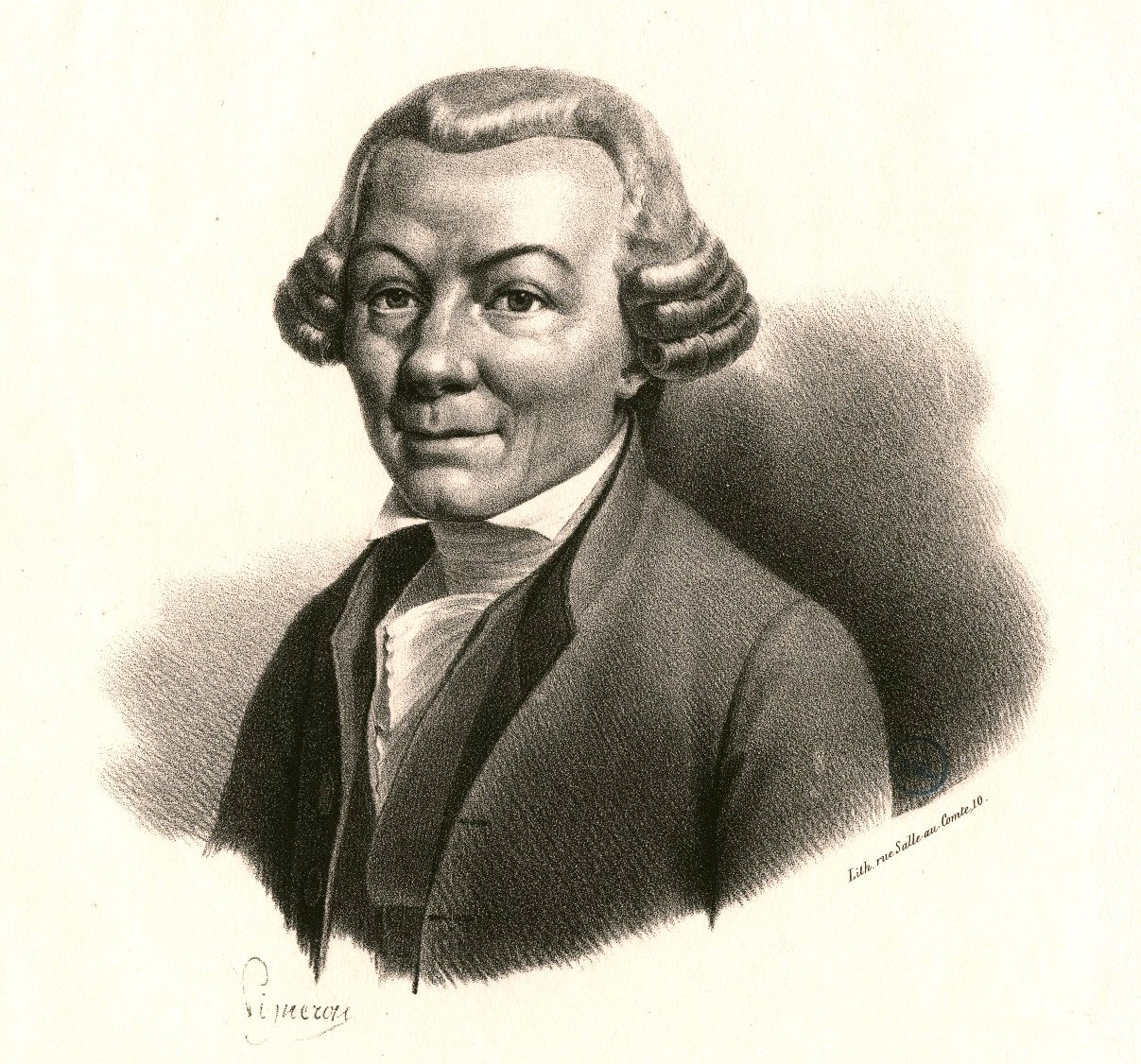
Paul Joseph Barthez

Paul Joseph Barthez (11 December 1734 – 15 October 1806) was a French physician, physiologist, and encyclopedist who developed a take on the biological theory known as vitalism.

== Life ==
He was born at Montpellier, educated at Narbonne and Toulouse, and began the study of medicine at Montpellier in 1750, taking his doctor's degree in 1753. In 1756, he obtained the appointment of physician to the military hospital in Normandy attached to the army of observation commanded by Marshal d'Estrées, but a severe attack of hospital fever compelled him to leave this post. In 1757, his services were required in the medical staff of the army of Westphalia, where he had the rank of consulting physician, and on his return to Paris he acted as joint editor of the Journal des savants and the Encyclopédie méthodique. In 1759 he obtained a medical professorship at Montpellier, and in 1774 he was created joint chancellor of the university.

In 1778, he published his most famous work, Nouveaux élémens de la science de l'homme, in which he employs the expression "vital principle" as a convenient term for the cause of the phenomena of life, without committing himself to either a spiritualistic or a materialistic view of its nature. Taking the degree of doctor of civil law in 1780, he secured the appointment of counsellor to the Supreme Court of Aids at Montpellier, but he soon took up his residence in Paris, having been nominated consulting physician to the king. In 1784, he was elected a foreign member of the Royal Swedish Academy of Sciences. Paul Joseph Barthez was called upon to edit or contribute several entries in the Encyclopédie of Denis Diderot and d’Alembert.

On the outbreak of the French Revolution he lost much of his fortune, but was much esteemed and honoured by Napoleon. He retired to Carcassonne, where he devoted himself to the study of theoretical medicine. It was from this retreat that he gave to the world his Nouvelle mécanique des mouvemens de l'homme et des animaux, which appeared in 1798. In 1802 he published his Traitement des maladies goutteuses, and he afterwards occupied himself in preparing for the press a new edition of his Élémens de la science de l'homme, of which he just lived to see the publication. His health had been declining for some years before his death, which took place soon after his removal to Paris.

He bequeathed his books and manuscripts to J. Lordat, who published two volumes of his Consultations de médecine in 1810. His Traité du beau was also published posthumously in 1807.

== See also ==
- Montpellier vitalism
- Théophile de Bordeu
