= Saint-Lô =

- Prefecture and commune
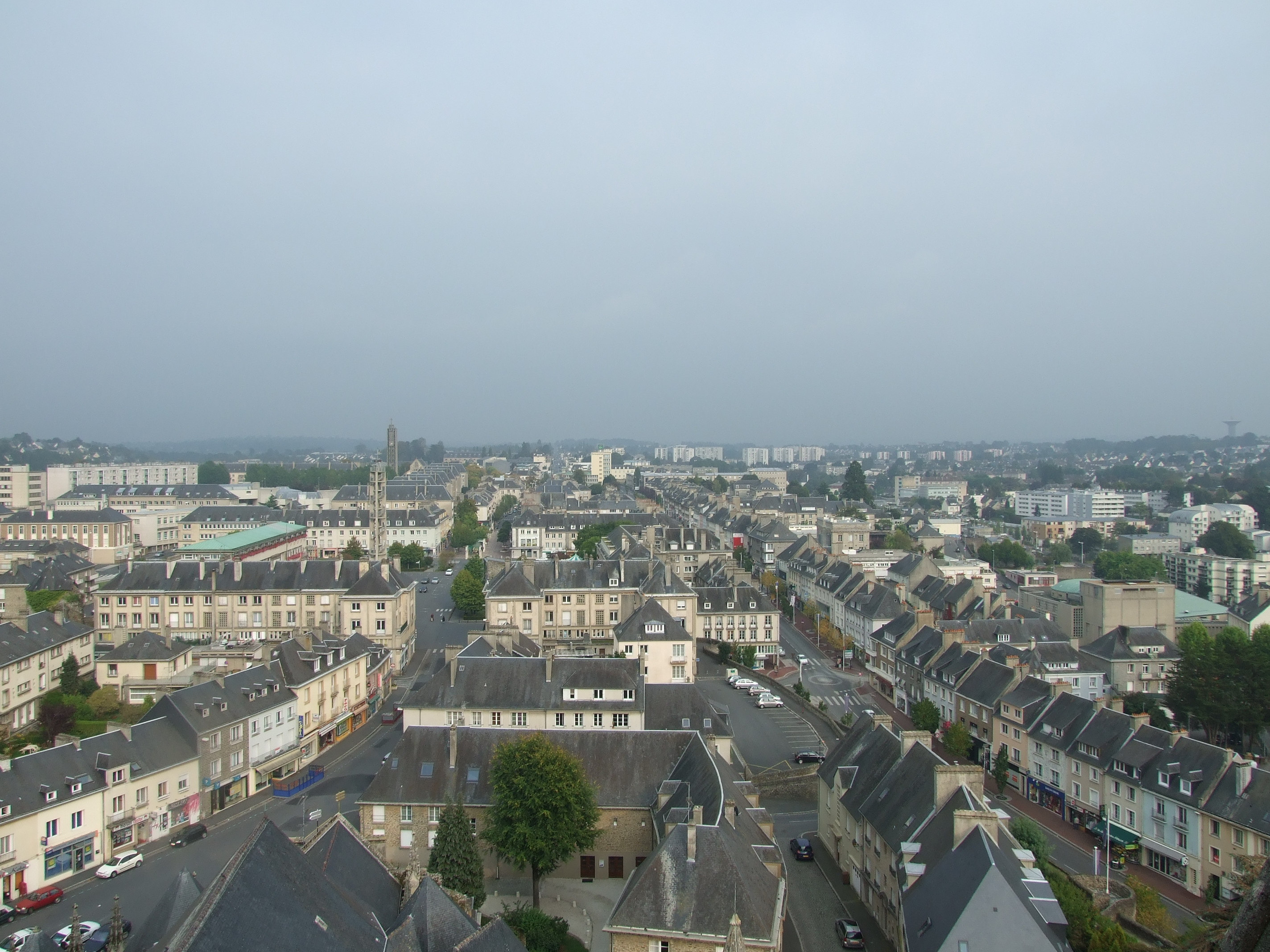
- A view of Saint-Lô from the Notre-Dame church

- Flag Coat of arms
- Location of Saint-Lô
- Location within France Location within Normandy
- Coordinates: 49°07′N 1°05′W
- Country: France
- Region: Normandy
- Department: Manche
- Arrondissement: Saint-Lô
- Canton: Saint-Lô-1 and 2
- Intercommunality: Saint-Lô Agglo

Government
  - Mayor (2020–2026): Emmanuelle Lejeune (DVD)
- Area^{1}: 23.19 km^{2} (8.95 sq mi)
- Elevation: 14 m (46 ft)
- Highest elevation: 134 m (440 ft)
- Lowest elevation: 7 m (23 ft)
- Population (2023): 19,471
  - Density: 839.6/km^{2} (2,175/sq mi)
- Time zone: UTC+01:00 (CET)
  - Summer (DST): UTC+02:00 (CEST)
- INSEE/Postal code: 50502 /50000
- ^{1} French Land Register data, which excludes lakes, ponds, glaciers > 1 km^{2} (0.386 sq mi or 247 acres) and river estuaries.

Saint-Lô (US: /sæ̃ ˈloʊ, seɪnt -, sənt -/, French: [sɛ̃ lo]; Breton: Sant Lo) is a commune in northwest France, the capital of the Manche department in the region of Normandy.

Although it is the second largest city of Manche after Cherbourg, it remains the prefecture of the department. It is also chef-lieu of an arrondissement and two cantons (Saint-Lô-1 and Saint-Lô-2). The place name derives from that of a local saint, Laud of Coutances.

The commune has 19,471 inhabitants as of 2023 who are called Saint-Lois(es) in French. The names of Laudois(es), Laudien(ne)s or Laudinien(ne)s are also cited. A martyr city of World War II, Saint-Lô was decorated with the Legion of Honour in 1948 and was given the nickname "Capital of the Ruins", a phrase popularised by Samuel Beckett.

== Geography ==
=== Location ===
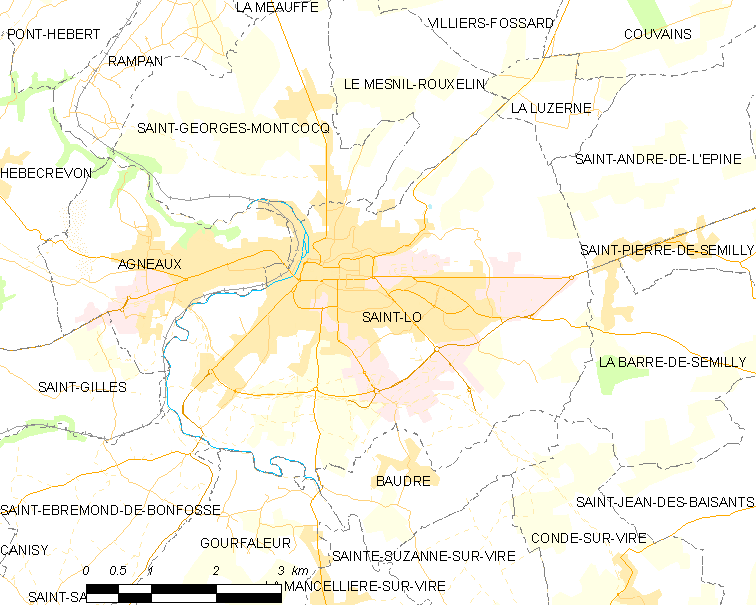
Map of the commune

Plan of the city centre

Saint-Lô is in the centre of Manche, in the middle of the Saint-Lois bocage, 57 km (35 mi) west of Caen, 78 km (48 mi) south of Cherbourg and 119 km (74 mi) north of Rennes.

The city was born under the name of Briovera on a rocky outcrop of schist belonging to the Armorican Massif, in the Cotentin Peninsula, between the confluences of the Vire – which dominates the city centre – with the Dollée and Torteron, two rivers channelled in their urban sections. This historic heart of the city became L'Enclos, a site well suited to passive defence.

The east of the territory is the former commune of Sainte-Croix-de-Saint-Lô, south of Saint-Thomas-de-Saint-Lô, absorbed in 1964.

=== Climate ===
Hydrography of Manche

Saint-Lô has a mild oceanic climate characterised by mild winters and temperate summers. It has an average annual rainfall of 800 to 900 mm (31 to 35 in) per year. Rainfall is quite frequent throughout the year but most abundant in autumn and winter, in connection with the disturbances coming from the Atlantic Ocean. Rarely intense, they often fall in the form of drizzle. The average temperature is 10 °C (50 °F). In winter, the average temperature ranges between 1 and 7 °C (34 and 45 °F). There are between 30 and 40 days of frost per year. In summer, the average temperature lies around 20 °C (68 °F).

Climate data for Saint-Lô (Condé-sur-Vire) (1991–2020 normals, extremes 1968–present)
Month	Jan	Feb	Mar	Apr	May	Jun	Jul	Aug	Sep	Oct	Nov	Dec	Year
Record high °C (°F)	16.6 (61.9)	21.8 (71.2)	24.8 (76.6)	27.0 (80.6)	30.9 (87.6)	36.3 (97.3)	39.5 (103.1)	38.3 (100.9)	32.8 (91.0)	29.3 (84.7)	20.9 (69.6)	17.7 (63.9)	39.5 (103.1)
Mean daily maximum °C (°F)	8.9 (48.0)	9.9 (49.8)	12.5 (54.5)	15.1 (59.2)	18.5 (65.3)	21.3 (70.3)	23.6 (74.5)	23.8 (74.8)	20.9 (69.6)	16.7 (62.1)	12.4 (54.3)	9.2 (48.6)	16.1 (61.0)
Daily mean °C (°F)	5.6 (42.1)	6.0 (42.8)	7.9 (46.2)	9.8 (49.6)	13.1 (55.6)	15.9 (60.6)	17.9 (64.2)	18.0 (64.4)	15.2 (59.4)	12.3 (54.1)	8.5 (47.3)	5.9 (42.6)	11.3 (52.3)
Mean daily minimum °C (°F)	2.3 (36.1)	2.1 (35.8)	3.3 (37.9)	4.6 (40.3)	7.7 (45.9)	10.4 (50.7)	12.3 (54.1)	12.2 (54.0)	9.6 (49.3)	7.9 (46.2)	4.7 (40.5)	2.5 (36.5)	6.6 (43.9)
Record low °C (°F)	−19.0 (−2.2)	−12.8 (9.0)	−10.5 (13.1)	−5.5 (22.1)	−3.0 (26.6)	0.0 (32.0)	2.9 (37.2)	2.1 (35.8)	−1.0 (30.2)	−6.2 (20.8)	−8.9 (16.0)	−11.8 (10.8)	−19.0 (−2.2)
Average precipitation mm (inches)	97.9 (3.85)	75.2 (2.96)	68.6 (2.70)	64.9 (2.56)	65.9 (2.59)	62.0 (2.44)	55.7 (2.19)	71.6 (2.82)	69.4 (2.73)	97.8 (3.85)	105.1 (4.14)	122.6 (4.83)	956.7 (37.67)
Average precipitation days (≥ 1.0 mm)	15.2	12.8	12.1	11.2	10.3	8.6	9.3	9.7	10.3	13.8	15.3	15.8	144.4
Source: Meteociel

=== Transport ===
Saint-Lô is located in the centre of the department of Manche and is therefore a node of communication between Nord-Cotentin and southern Manche.

==== Road ====
Road network in the area of the Cotentin Peninsula

Saint-Lô lies halfway along the Coutances–Bayeux axis (RD 972). A bypass road was commissioned in the 1980s to allow the decongestion of the city from the south. To open up the port of Cherbourg, the region and the department decided the construction of a dual carriageway, RN 174. It is a part of the European route E03 and enables direct connection to Rennes and Europe from the south, through the interchange at Guilberville. The southern section now connects Saint-Lô directly to the A84 autoroute, allowing motorway access to Caen and Rennes. The commissioning of the northern section, which is currently under construction, will meanwhile allow access to Cherbourg and England via the Route nationale 13. The construction of the dual carriageway allowed the extension of the small South ring road heading west and its mutation into genuine urban bypass. It has also enabled the creation and expansion of new business zones which contribute strongly to the current growth of the agglomeration.

==== Rail ====
Rail network in the area of the Cotentin Peninsula

The Gare de Saint-Lô is served by TER trains on the Caen – Rennes railway line. It is in the majority of services for travellers in the direction of Caen via Lison or in the direction of Coutances. A few trains, two daily return trips, serve as far as Rennes via Avranches.

Following the electrification of the section of railway between Lison and Saint-Lô during 2006, the SNCF and local communities experienced a direct Intercités service (without change of train) to the Gare Saint-Lazare in Paris for two years, between December 2008 and December 2010. This service was not sustained due to a lack of sufficient number of passengers. There is also the disused former industrial line to Condé-sur-Vire. The section between Gourfaleur and Condé-sur-Vire, adjacent to the towpath along the Vire, is used by the Vélorail [rail cycle] of the Vire valley since 2007.

==== Urban transport network ====
Urban transportation is provided by the Transports Urbains Saint-Lô Agglomération: TUSA (formerly Transport Urbains Saint-Lô Agneaux), was created in 1980. In 2010, the network consisted of four lines (Odyssée, Azur, Horizon and Alizé) with 15 buses and one Ocitolà transport on demand minibus. However, since 3 January 2011, it is composed of three lines (1, 2 and 3) still with 15 buses and one Ocitolà transport on demand minibus. In 2008, the company recorded more than 850,000 journeys.

On 15 May 2013, seven new vehicles were integrated with the fleet, namely five Vehixel Cytios 4/44, and two Mercedes-Benz Citaro K BHNS. The total fleet is composed of a Renault Master B.20 (for the Ocitolà transport on demand), 5 Vehixel Cytios 4/44, 2 Mercedes-Benz Citaro K BHNS, two Van Hool A320, five Heuliez GX 317, and a Heuliez GX 327.

A new vehicle wrapping campaign is underway, the yellow livery will disappear in favour of a red livery. Added to this, a campaign of improving vehicle facilities, to meet the new standards of accessibility of public transit, including on-board announcements and scrolling banners. The old Renault PR 100.2 (nos. 97205, 97207 to 97210) and Renault PR112 (nos. 97211 and 97212) were scrapped.

Route	Termini	Main stops
1	Saint-Lô-Colombes <> Agneaux-Villechien / La Demeurance Commercial Centre	Pasteur College, Manche Habitat, City Hall, SNCF railway station, CFA d'Agneaux, private establishment of the institute, Commercial Centre
2	Saint-Lô-Conseil Général <> Saint-Lô-La Madeleine	Hospital, Lavalley College, SNCF railway station, City Hall, Cultural Centre, Sainte Croix Church, Commercial Centre, St. Jean Clinic, TUSA depot
3	Saint-Lô–Bois Ardent / Aquatic Centre <> Saint-Georges-Montcocq-Mairie	Chevalerie business park, Commercial Centre, Corot & Curie schools, Bon Sauveur, SNCF railway station, City Hall, the Mont Russel Lift, Social Security, La Dollée quarter, Saint–Georges church, Saint-Georges town hall
Ocitolà	Transport on demand for the whole of the community of communes	Baudre town hall, Pont-Hébert town hall, La Meauffe-Quartier du Pont, Rampan town hall, Ste-Suzanne town hall

==== Intercity transport network ====
TUSA network (January 2011)

The commune is associated with the departmental public buses (Manéo) by the lines:

- 001 : Cherbourg-Octeville – Valognes – Carentan – Saint-Lô
- 002 : Coutances – Marigny – Saint-Lô
- 109 : Saint-Lô – Periers
- 113 : Villedieu-les-Poêles – Saint-Lô
- 117 : Guilberville – Torigni – Saint-Lô
- 303 : Saint-Hilaire-du-Harcouët – Vire – Saint-Lô – Lison
- 304 : Brécey – Villedieu-les-Poêles – Saint-Lô – Lison

==== Air and river transport ====
Despite its status of prefecture, there is no airfield in the vicinity of the town. The nearest is that of Lessay, and for an airport, to join that of Caen-Carpiquet, Cherbourg-Maupertus or Rennes – Saint-Jacques.

Inland waterway transport on the Vire once existed with scows ensuring the transport of tangue. It is no longer possible, due to lack of maintenance of the various equipment and the Vire.

== History ==
Saint-Lô has long been an important centre of the economy of Normandy. It has attracted the covetousness of neighboring nations, including England, resulting in many successive invasions. It lost its dominant position towards the end of the 19th century because it failed to take advantage of the first Industrial Revolution, which instead affected much of the predominantly peasant population. However, the decentralisation policy allowed the city to return to the foreground.

=== Briovère ===
Originally called Briovera (meaning "Bridge on the Vire River" in Gaulish) (often written in French as Briovère), the town is built on and around ramparts. The town started life as a Gallic fortified settlement, occupied by the tribe of the Unelli of Cotentin. Briovere was conquered by the Romans led by Quintus Titurius Sabinus in 56 BC, after the defeat of their leader Viridovix at Mont Castre. Roman peace led the development of Gallo-Roman rural areas, on the model of the Roman villae rusticae as in Canisy, Marigny and Tessy-sur-Vire, whose names are based on the suffix -i-acum, of location of Celtic origin *-i-āko-, and often composed with a Latin personal name, carried by a Gallo-Roman native. Then, the region was the scene of various Saxon invasions during the 3rd century. The Franks did not establish an administrative power there, although Briovera was nevertheless entitled to hammer coinage. Historian Claude Fauchet said, "the Coutentin, at the same time as our Merovingian kings, was inhabited by the Sesnes (Saxons), pirates, and seems to have been abandoned by Carolingians, as variable and too remote for correction by our kings, to the Normans and other plunderers of sea..."

Sainte-Croix Church was built in 300, said to be on the ruins of a temple of Ceres. Christianity grew quite late. There were only four bishops of Coutances before 511. Laud of Coutances, bishop in 525–565, had a residence here. After his death he was beatified and was particularly honoured by Briovera, which would have housed his tomb. A pilgrimage was conducted and the city took the name of Saint-Laud, and then the name Saint-Lô which has been known since the 8th century.

=== Middle Ages ===
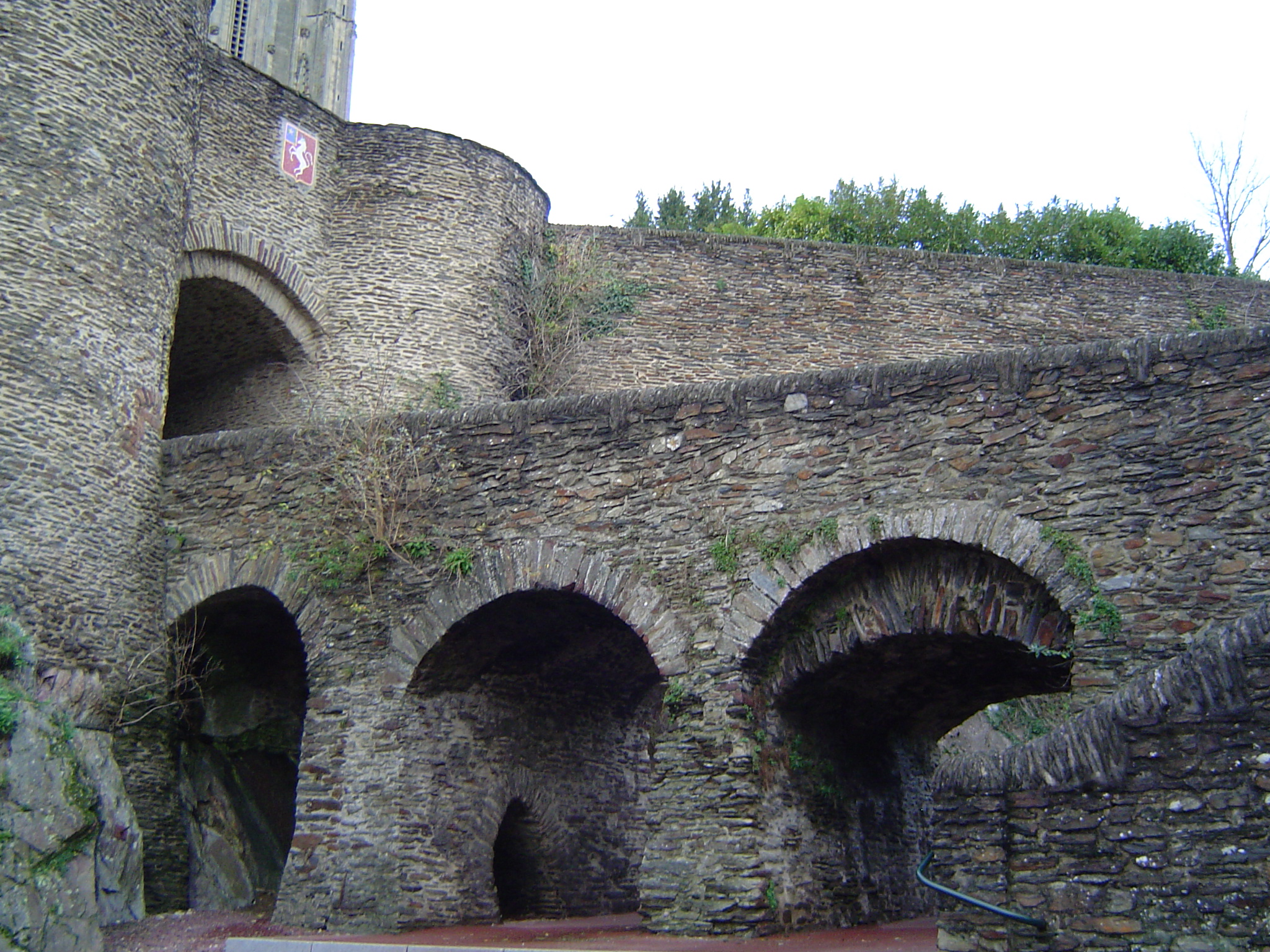
The main entrance to the town.

The Bretons, led by King Salomon, began to occupy the west coast of the Cotentin Peninsula from 836. Before their advances, in August 867, Charles the Bald gave Salomon the Comitatus Constantiensis, territory over which he had little influence. In 889, the Vikings travelled up the Vire and besieged Saint-Lô. Protected by solid ramparts built, according to tradition, in the early 9th century by Charlemagne, the town did not initially surrender. The attackers then cut the water supply, resulting in the surrender of the inhabitants. The Vikings massacred the inhabitants, including the Bishop of Coutances, and then razed the town. The seat of the diocese moved to Rouen. It was only in 1025 that Bishop Herbert decided to return to the walls of Saint-Lô and restore the episcopal see. Then, under Geoffrey de Montbray, the town experienced a great economic development, taking advantage of the Norman expedition in Sicily. Robert Guiscard, a close associate of Geoffrey, brought important loot to Apulia and Calabria, and it was thanks to this treasure that Geoffrey was able to rebuild Coutances Cathedral in 1056. Saint-Lô is famous for its goldsmiths and even Matilda of Flanders, the wife of William the Conqueror, ordered two candelabra for the Abbaye aux Dames.

The population of the region participated in the conquest of England. Henry I, Count of Cotentin and eventually King of England strengthened Saint-Lô in 1090. In 1091, Geoffrey de Montbray, Bishop of Coutances, had a lock and mills built on the River Vire. With the death of Henry I in 1135, Stephen of Blois, Count of Mortain and Geoffrey of Anjou disputed the legitimacy of the realm. Saint-Lô sided with Stephen but was taken in 1139 by the Plantagenet army in just three days. The Archbishop of Canterbury, Thomas Becket, passed through Saint-Lô and a church, of which there remains no trace except the name of the Rue Saint-Thomas, was dedicated to him. In 1204, Saint-Lô submitted to Philip Augustus and became French. During this period of peace, the town prospered: It had the Hôtel-Dieu built on the edges of the town along with part of the Notre-Dame church and in 1234 a guild of tailors was established. Saint Louis came to the city twice, in 1256 and 1269. Saint-Lô was then the third largest town in the Duchy of Normandy after Rouen and Caen. In 1275 it received the right to mint coins from King Philip III of France, which it maintained until 1693. It specialised in tanneries with the designation la vache de Saint-Lô [the cowhide of Saint-Lô]. After Toustain de Billy, its own trade of laces and leather aiguillettes amounted to one million in 1555; in knife making: A 16th century saying "Qui voudroit avoir bon couteau, Il faudroit aller à Saint-Lô" [Who would wish to have good knife, it would be necessary to go to Saint-Lô]; in goldsmithing; and in textiles, one of the main centres of France. There were more than 2,000 weavers, located mostly near the Dollée, a less powerful river than the Vire but with a smoother flow. Wool was imported from across the Cotentin peninsula. An order of 20 June 1460 fixed a special edge to the sheets of Saint-Lô.

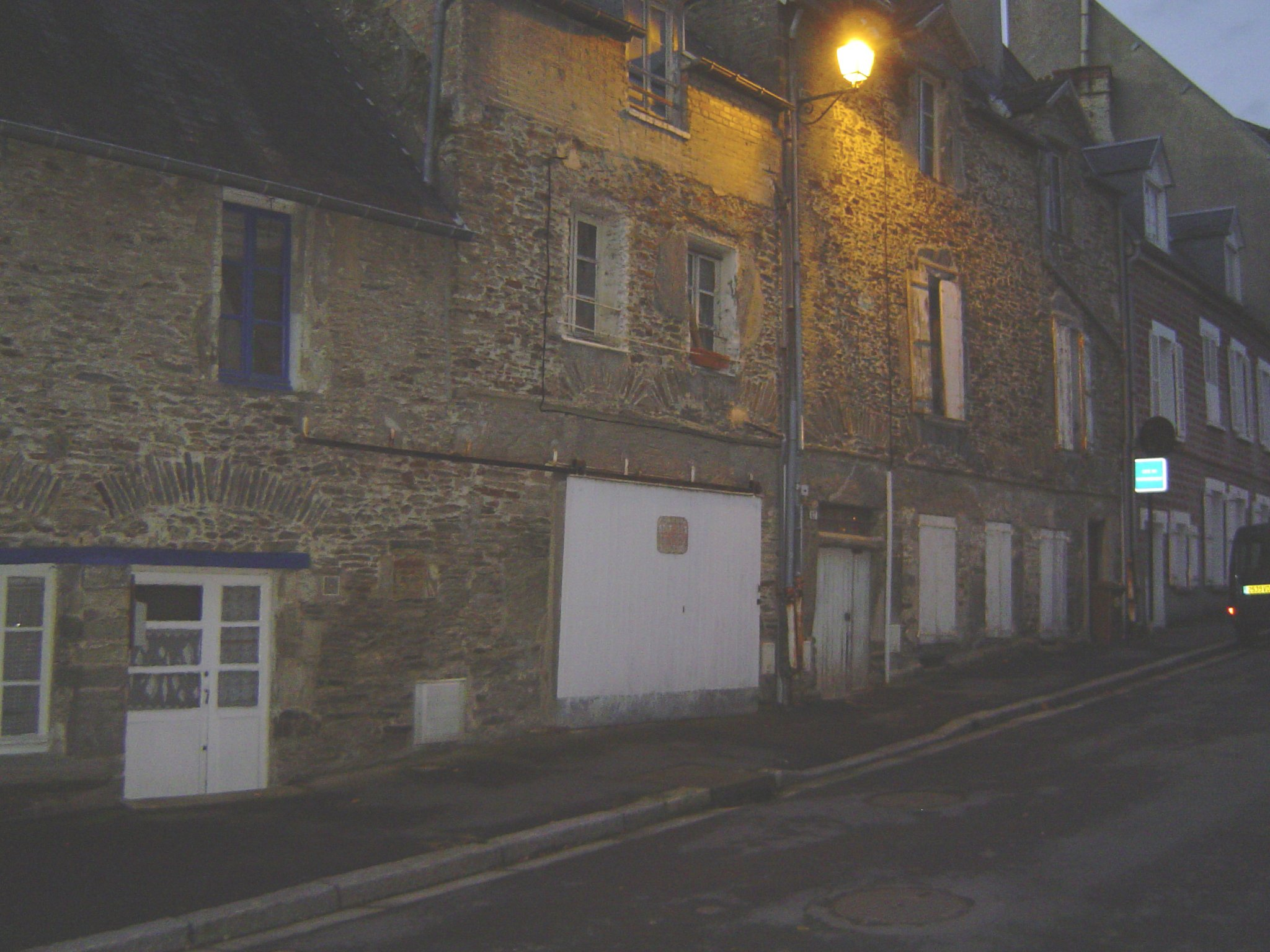
There remains no more than a few saved streets, such as Rue Saint-Georges and Rue Porte-au-Four, in old Saint-Lô.

The English landed at Saint-Vaast-la-Hougue on 12 July 1346 and then moved upon Saint-Lô on 22 July. Jean Froissart describes "the big town of Saint-Leu in Constentin,... for the hard times, was rich and mercantile." The town was sacked.

=== 16th to 20th centuries ===
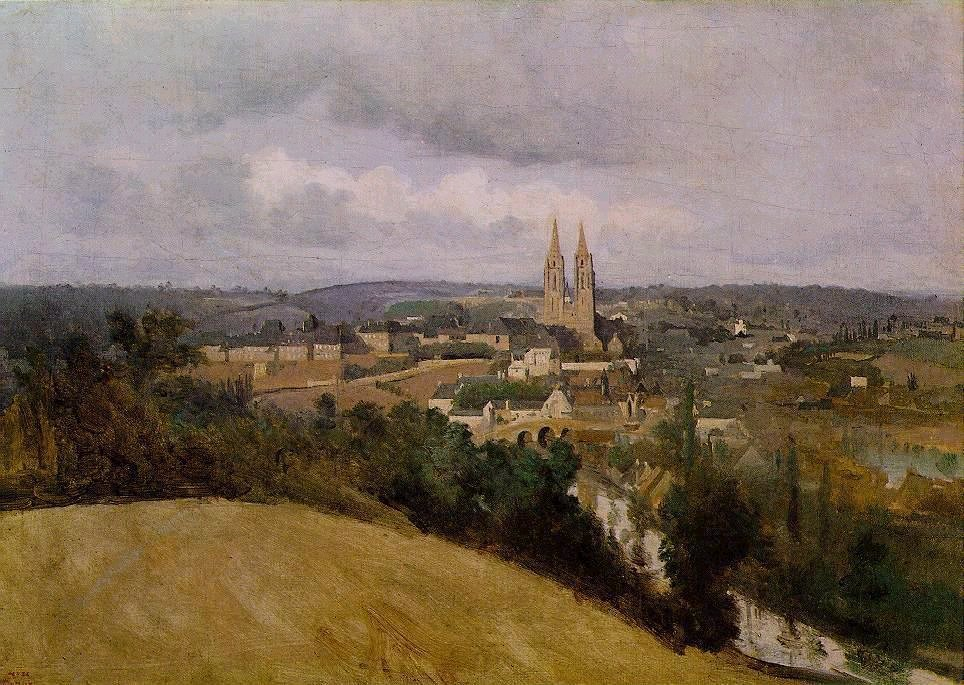
Jean-Baptiste Corot, La Vire à Saint-Lô (1850–1855), Museum of the Louvre.

The period of peace had returned but the Cotentin lost its importance. Francis I was acclaimed at the door of the Neufbourg in 1532. In the 16th century, Protestantism won the round. Saint-Lô had a reformed church from 1555 and early printed books would be Protestant works. Saint-Lô suffered notably during the Wars of Religion. The Huguenots, holding Saint-Lô and Carentan, ransacked Coutances in 1562 and seized the Bishop Artus de Cossé-Brissac, who was dragged in the town of Saint-Lô on a donkey. Although, while the Edict of Pacification of Amboise had prompted the city to submit to Charles IX in February 1574, Norman Protestants made their headquarters in Saint-Lô. Troops led by the Marshal de Matignon besieged the city on 1 May, assaulted it 10 days later and captured it on 10 June. There were more than 500 deaths among those whose leader was Colombières, Lord of Bricqueville, but the Protestant Grand Captain Gabriel I of Montgomery escaped through the door of the Dollée. The town was ceded to Jacques II de Matignon who built the citadel. Two years later the seigneury of the bishops of Coutances over the town ceased forever.

As a result of the war, in 1580, Saint-Lô lost the headquarters of the présidial, transferred to Coutances, capital of the bailiwick. In the mid-17th century part of the walls were destroyed, and the town grew with a new borough known as Neufborg. After the revocation of the Edict of Nantes (1685), most craftsmen abandoned Saint-Lô. The Revolt of the va-nu-pieds shook the area slightly in 1636, when the Government wanted to extend the gabelle in Cotentin. The region flourished especially in the manufacture of so-called d'estame wool socks. In 1678, the relics of Saint Laud were brought back to Notre-Dame. The route between Paris and Cherbourg, built to 1761, passes to Saint-Lô, facilitating trade. The French Revolution of 1789 overthrew the administrative division of France and the capital of the department was temporarily set at Coutances between 1794 and 1796. Saint-Lô took the Republican name "Rocher de la Liberté" [Rock of Freedom] and a tree was planted on the Champ de Mars. The city was relatively untouched during the Reign of Terror although there were some clashes with the Chouans.

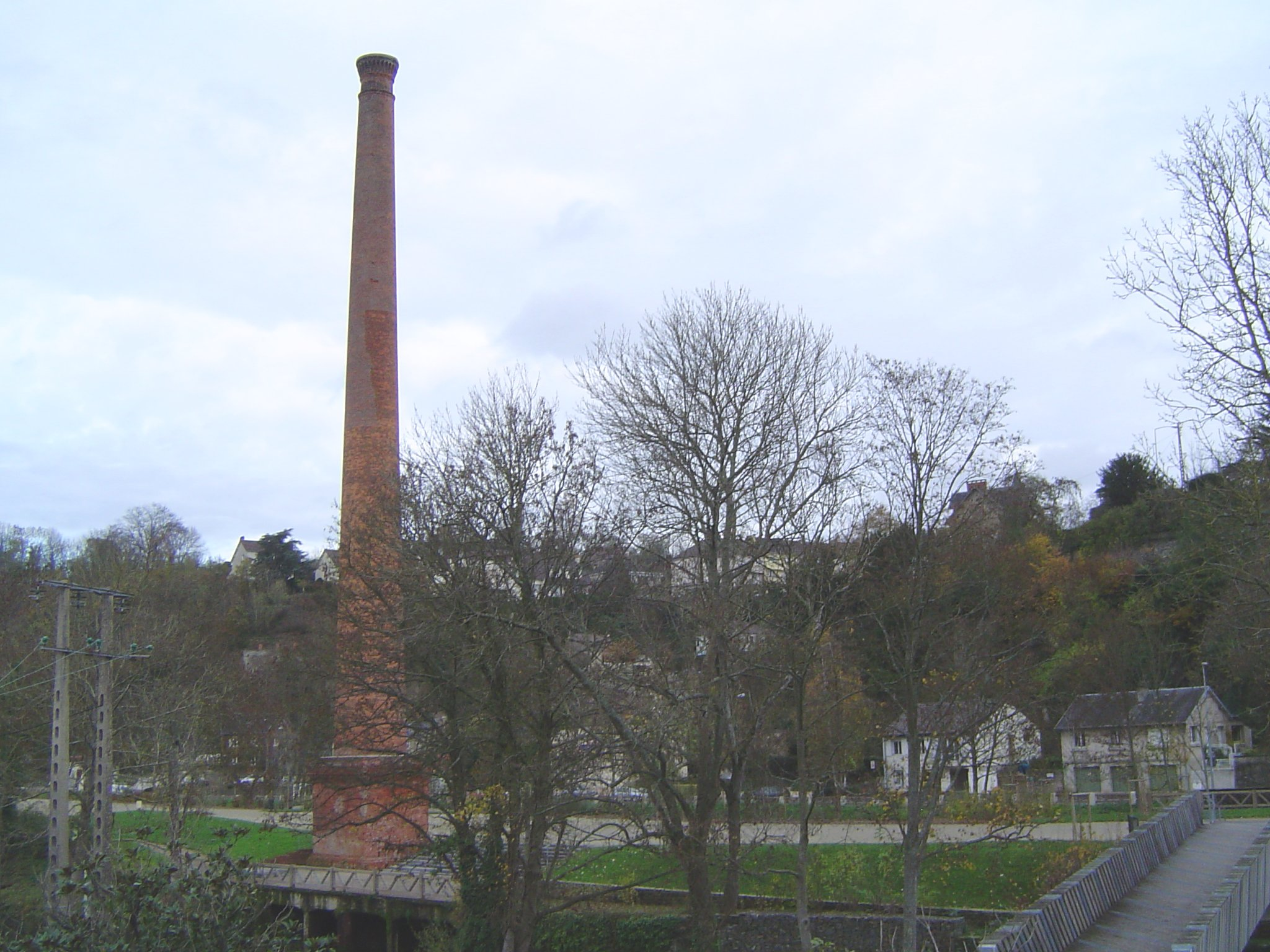
Only the chimney of the paper mill withstood the fire of 1930.

The Napoleonic period saw the creation of the national stud. In 1827, Marie Thérèse of France, Duchess of Angoulême, passed through Saint-Lô and she was struck by the beauty of the landscape. She then planned to bring the sea to Saint-Lô making the River Vire navigable. The creation of the Vire and Taute Canal in 1833 allowed the establishment of the connection between Carentan and Saint-Lô. Then, by order of 10 July 1835, the Vire was classified as navigable. Baron Alfred Mosselman built a port at Saint-Lô in recruiting nearly 250 military detainees and Spanish prisoners. A boatyard was created and traffic flowed at 50 tons in 1841 to more than 132 in 1846. Mosselman then launched barges and introduced horse traction by arranging the towpaths of the waterway. Several goods were transported but mainly the tangue and the lime from the quarries of Pont-Hébert and Cavigny. It thus passed from 1,233 tonnes of lime production in 1841 to 30,000 in 1858. In 1867, the paper mill of Valvire (Note: Information board arranged in front of the chimney.) was built near the spillway and manufactured packing paper. It was destroyed by fire in 1930 and little remains beyond the chimney of the plant.

Saint-Lô ruled out the Mantes-la-Jolie–Cherbourg railway because its inhabitants, having fear of industrial progress, refused a path linking them to Paris. It would be attached to the rail network in 1860. In the 19th century, Saint-Lô, in the heart of a rich farming area, established itself as an important place for trade in animals, but the fear of the rural population towards the industrial revolution was blocking its development. River traffic transit saw 53,000 tonnes of goods, only 6% of which were foodstuffs. A leak was discovered in the canal and the River Vire was decommissioned in 1926. The region experienced a significant rural exodus and suffered casualties of the war of 1870 and the First World War. The Valvire paper mill burned down in the 1930s and would never be rebuilt. The demographics of the department was very negative from 1850. The city entered World War II in a declining situation.

In 1914 and 1915, Saint-Lô welcomed the temporary hospital No. 2 of the 10th Army Corps.

The criminal case of Jean Philippe took place in Saint-Lô, and was then judged by the Court of Assizes of Manche, at Coutances on 9 December 1940.

=== World War II ===
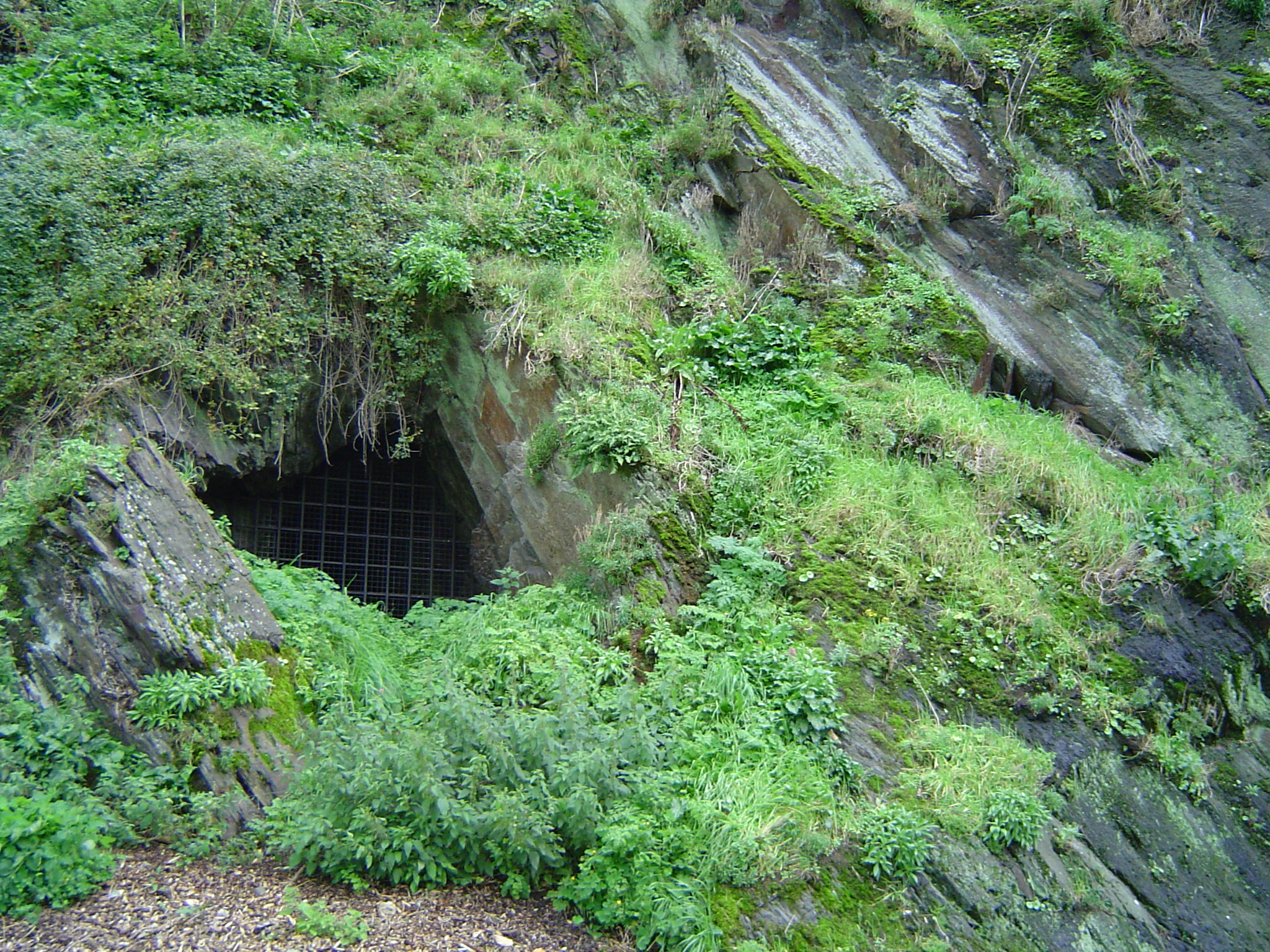
The underground entrance to the ramparts.

France was invaded in 1940 and the 7th Panzer Division, commanded by Erwin Rommel, entered Normandy. The objective being the capture of the city of Cherbourg, the centre of Manche was bypassed as the German Army occupied Saint-Lô, a strategic crossroads, on the night of 17 June 1940. During the occupation, the statue of the Norman dairywoman and the Havin statue, both made by Arthur Le Duc were sold and melted to make cannons, despite opposition from local politicians. In March 1943, the Germans decided to dig a tunnel under the rock. For the time being, no one is able to say what the usefulness of this tunnel would have been, though it was dug at the same time as the Agneaux Institute. Workers from the STO would be required until the beginning of the Battle of Normandy. Then, the underground, under construction, would house the sick of the Hôtel-Dieu located opposite and a part of the Saint-Lô population.

A German soldier was shot in January 1944 and several local people were arrested. The cinema, theatre and bars were closed, radios confiscated and the curfew was extended to 8pm.

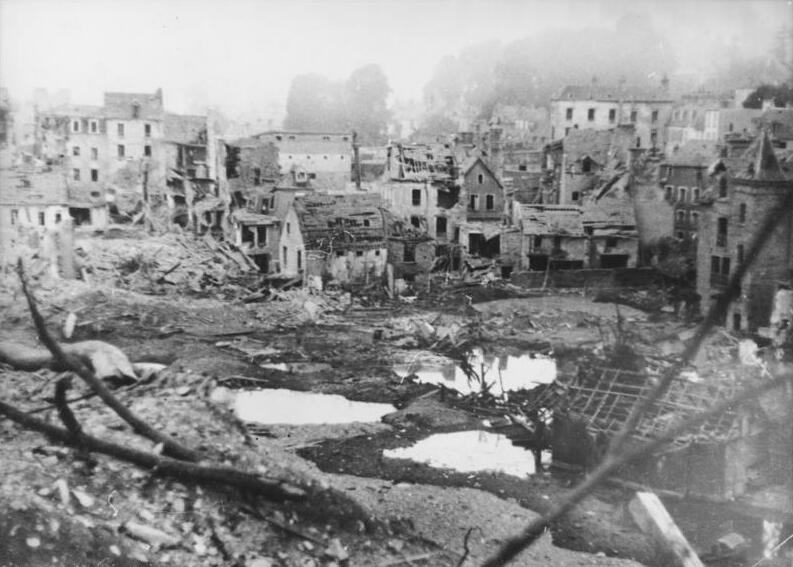
Saint-Lô after U.S. bombing, July 1944

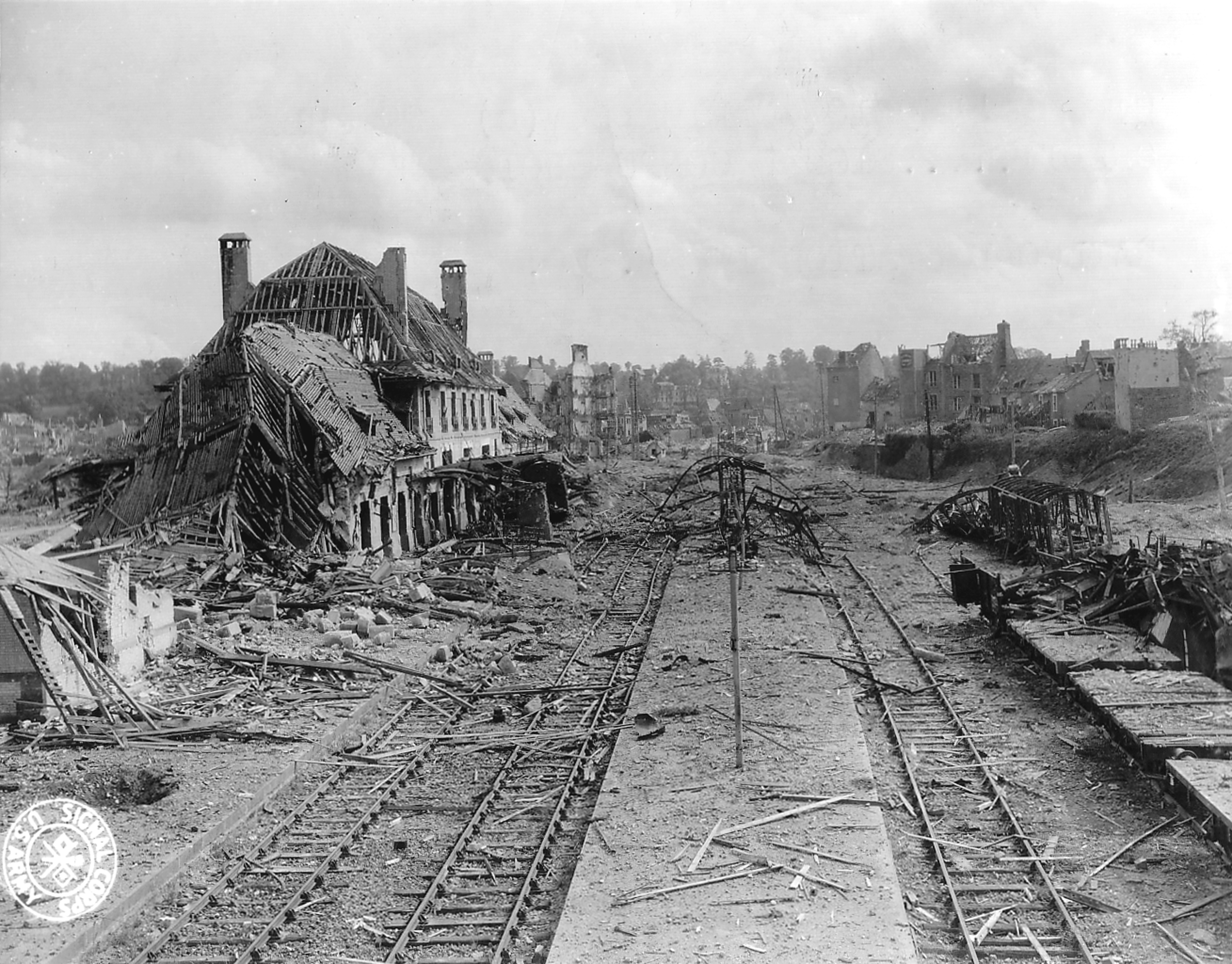
The destroyed station of Saint-Lô.

During the Liberation, Saint-Lô suffered two series of air attacks during the Battle of Normandy. The first was the bombardment of the city by the Americans during the night of D-Day 6–7 June 1944. The first American air strike killed almost eight hundred civilians. Allied planes continued to attack the power plant and rail facilities daily for a week.

A second series of air attacks began on 17 July, during the Battle of Saint-Lô, which would give its name to the USS St. Lo. This time the city was bombed by the Germans. As a main transport center, the city was a nexus of military activity starting the Battle of Normandy and on to the breakout from Normandy, Operation Cobra. As a result of air and ground attacks, Saint-Lô was almost totally destroyed (90–95% according to common estimates). The city was dubbed "The Capital of the Ruins" by Samuel Beckett. Saint-Lô was one of the key cities to the opening of the Falaise Gap, which ultimately allowed Allied forces to expel the Germans from northern France.

By order of Major General Charles Gerhardt, a jeep carried the body of Major Thomas Howie, later immortalized as "The Major of St. Lô", wrapped in a flag on its hood so that it could be said that he was the first American to enter the city.

Saint-Lô received the Legion of Honour and the Croix de Guerre 1939–1945 on 2 June 1948 with a citation for "capital of the Manche Department which has retained full confidence in the destiny of the country. Suffered on the night of 6–7 June, with a heroic calm, an air bombardment to such a point that its inhabitants could consider themselves as citizens of the capital of the ruins". These awards would be given on 6 June by President Vincent Auriol. The two communes, now absorbed from Sainte-Croix-de-Saint-Lô and Saint-Thomas-de-Saint-Lô, were also decorated with the Croix de Guerre 1939–1945 on 11 November 1948.

=== Postwar period ===
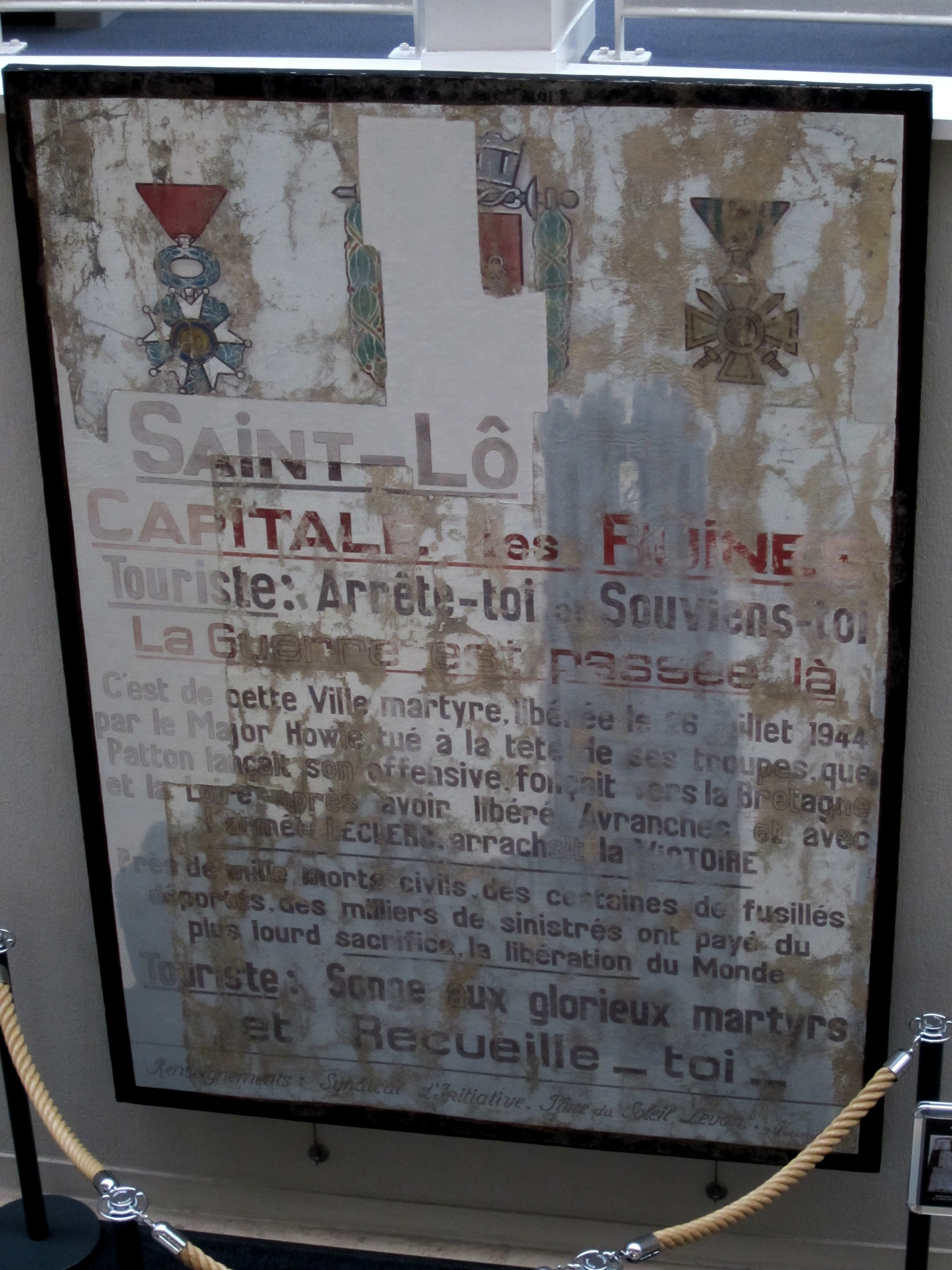
Saint-Lô, Capital of ruins

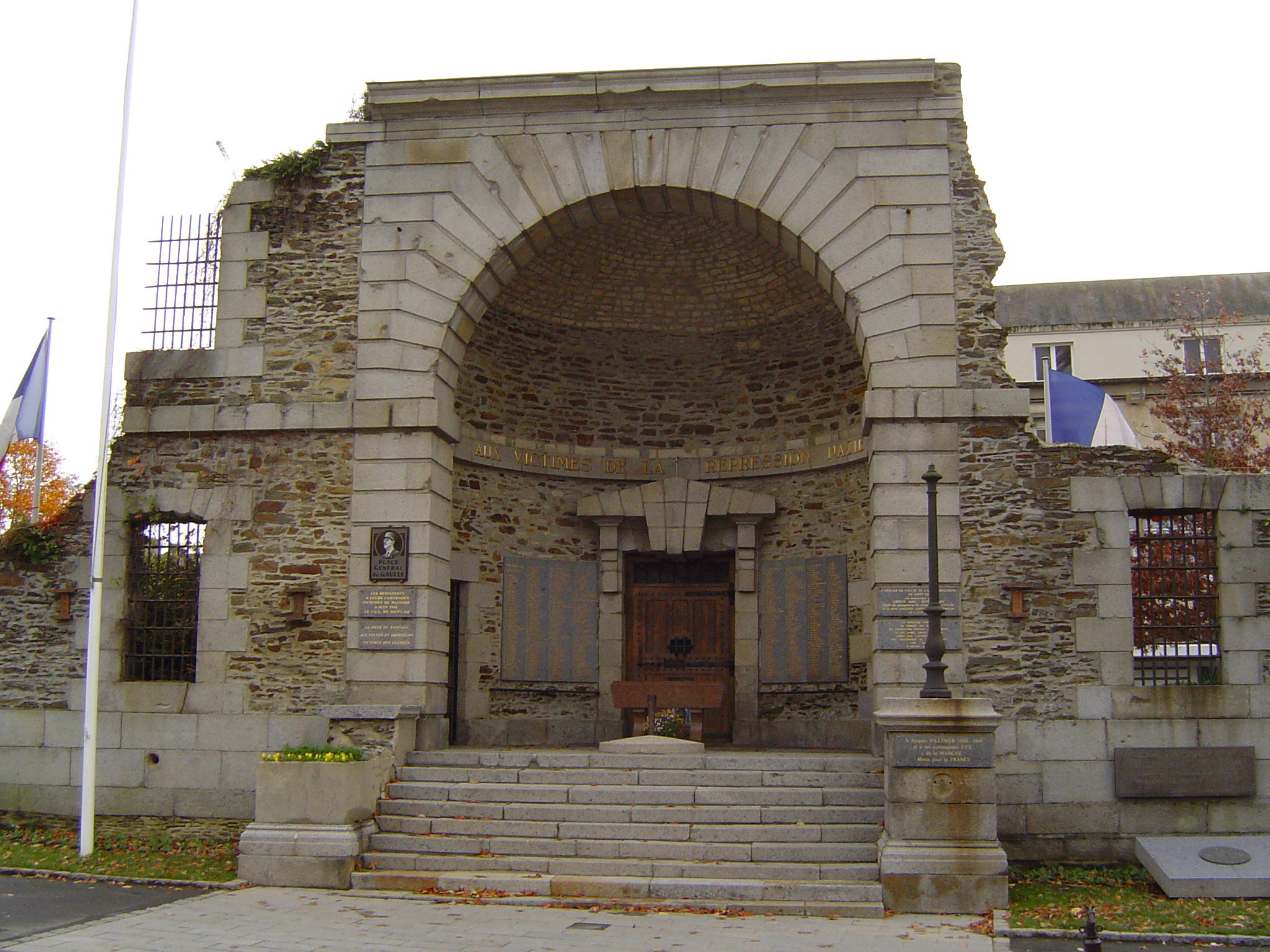
The remains of the former prison

After the war the question arose as to whether the town should be rebuilt or left with its ruins intact as a testimony to the bombing. One American soldier laconically commented: "We sure liberated the hell out of this place".

Almost totally destroyed (97%), Saint-Lô had the unenviable nickname of Capital of Ruins, an expression attributed to Archbishop Bernard Jacqueline. It was the reason which compelled the prefect of the ruins Édouard Lebas to settle in Coutances. This Capital of Ruins was revived by Samuel Beckett in his text The Capital of Ruins of 10 June 1946, which he wrote for Raidió Éireann, proving how much it remained marked by what he had seen and done in Saint-Lô. The Notre-Dame church located on the ramparts still bears the scars of bombing and bloody clashes which took place. The population timidly returned to the city. There were 180 people on 12 August 1944, but U.S. authorities decided not to issue authorisation of residence and supplied tickets. A lengthy clean-up began, including the corpses of residents and soldiers, which lasted until 15 October 1944. However, officials hesitated to rebuild Saint-Lô. Indeed, some were willing to leave the ruins as a testament to the martyrdom of the city and later rebuild a new Saint-Lô. The population declined, preferring to reinhabit its city.

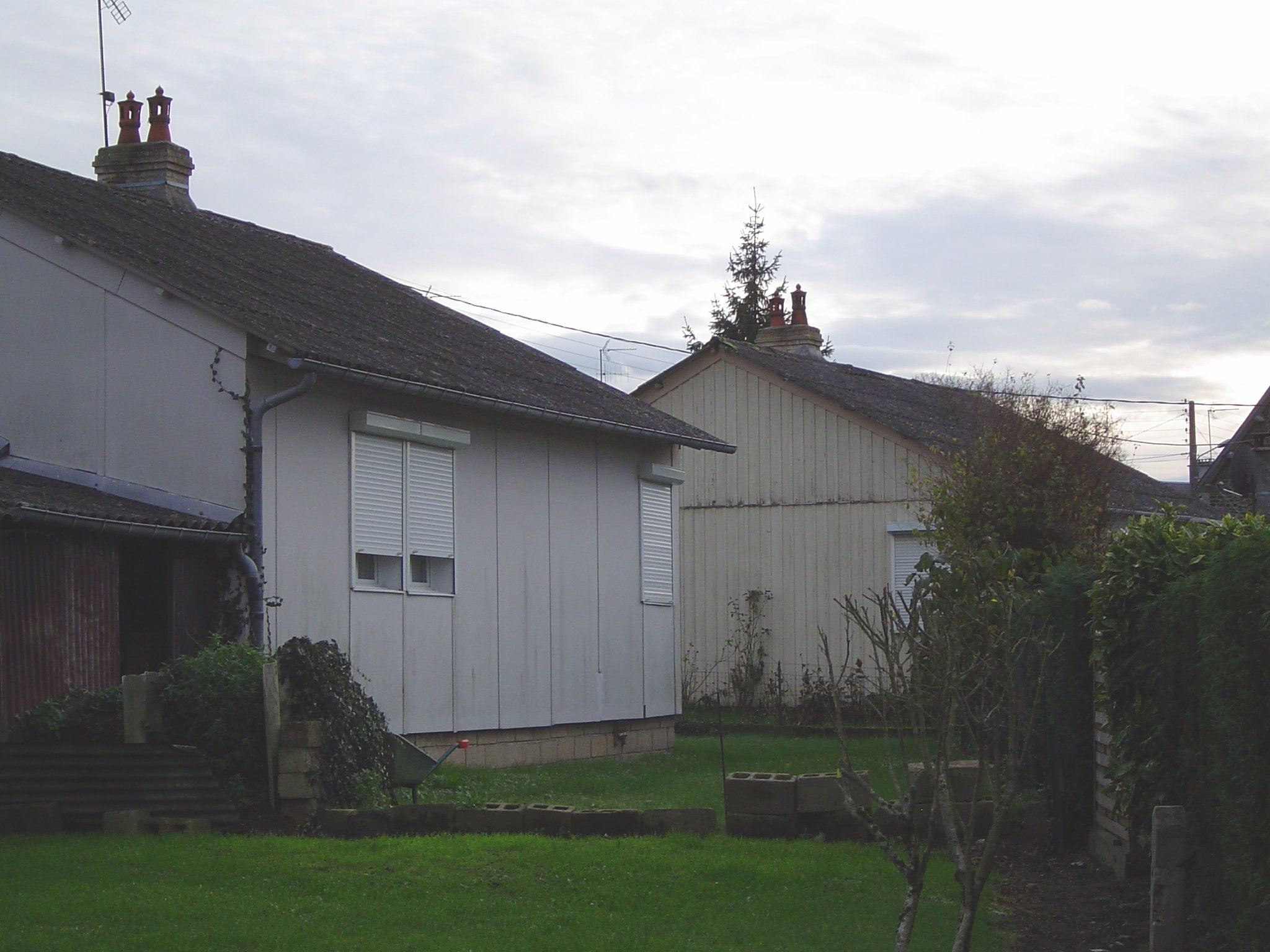
Many traces of wooden barracks remain.

In April 1945, the Reconstruction Minister Raoul Dautry advocated a provisional wooden barracks building. These huts are built through the generosity of the donations. Thus, the association of the Swiss grant unblocked an appropriation of 620,000 Swiss francs to build homes and a community centre. On 10 October 1949, Switzerland offered a gold ingot to the city which yielded 649,490 francs. There were ten housing estates in 1948, some which contained over 70 houses. The barracks were delivered in kit form, and it was enough to build them on the spot. Each had different specifics according to their place of origin (Swedish, Finnish, Swiss, French, American, Canadian). The Irish Red Cross participated in the construction of a 100-bed hospital consisting of 25 buildings (located level with the Pasteur college) and landed 174 tons of equipment starting in August 1945. The hospital was inaugurated on Sunday, 7 April 1946 and the Irish medical team left Saint-Lô at the beginning of January 1947. This hospital, consisting of wooden shacks, operated until 1956.

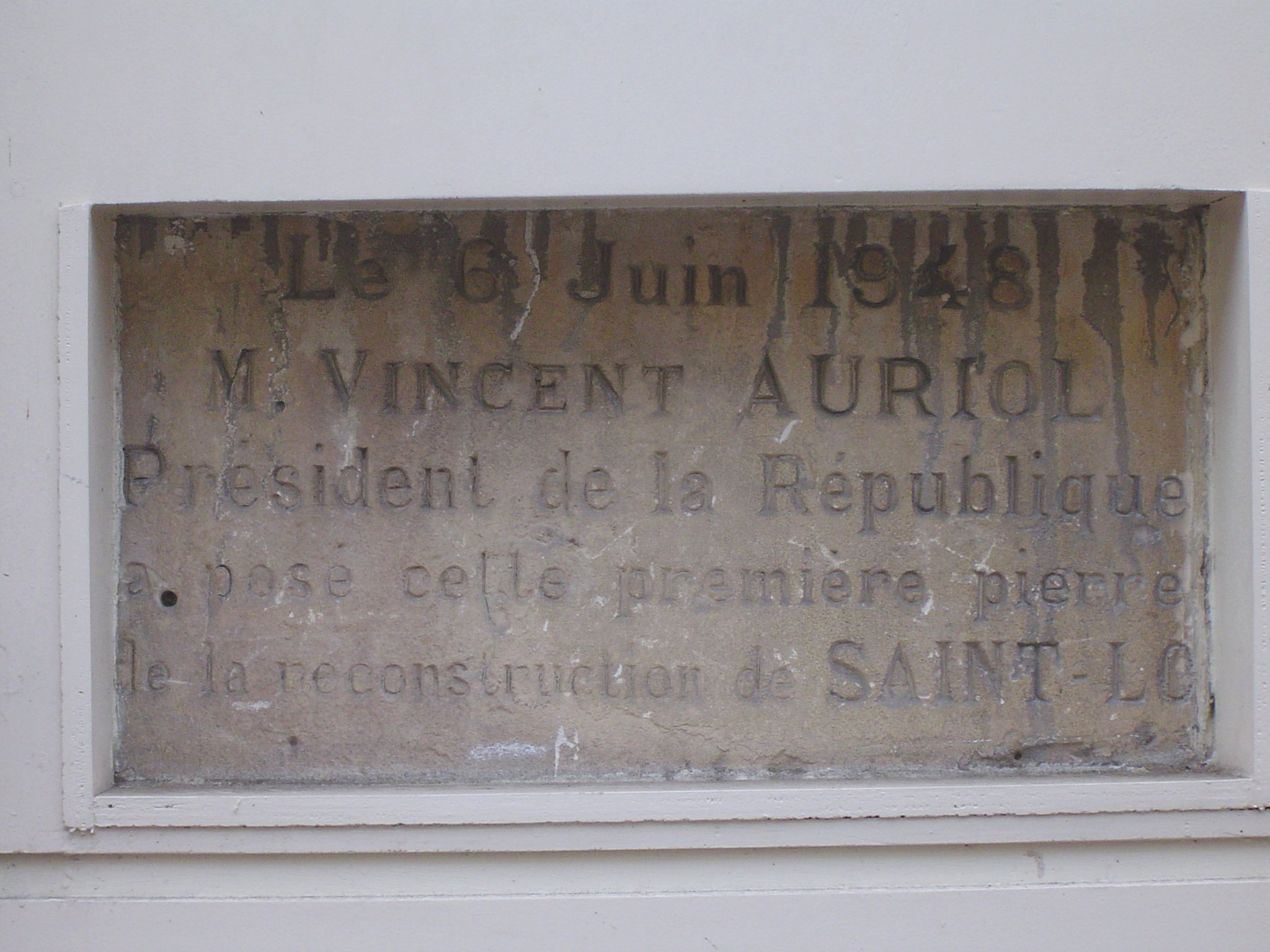
The first stone of the reconstruction

By 1948, a more permanent Saint-Lô had to be rebuilt. This would be done on the basis of plans designed by the Chief Architect of the reconstruction André Hilt (died 1946), which had proposed to retain the general fabric of the town by adapting it to modern needs. President Vincent Auriol laid the first stone just four years after landing.

The France – United States Memorial Hospital

As partial reparation for the destruction of the city, the Americans, behind the bombing, decided to build a modern hospital. The plans were made by the architect Paul Nelson, who decided to build a contemporary-style building. It is located on the Route de Villedieu. Work began in 1949, and it was completed on 10 May 1956. A monumental mosaic was made by Fernand Léger, which pays tribute to peace and Franco-American friendship: Both hands towards the Cotentin Peninsula symbolised with an apple tree branch in bloom. It was at that time the largest hospital in Europe. On 29 November 1949, the journalist Frédéric Pottecher submitted a hypothesis to not move the prefecture of Manche from Saint-Lô. Although, during the reconstruction, it was temporarily placed in Coutances. The whole of the population reacted and a petition collected more than 2,400 signatures.

The prefecture returned to Saint-Lô in 1953, into new premises.

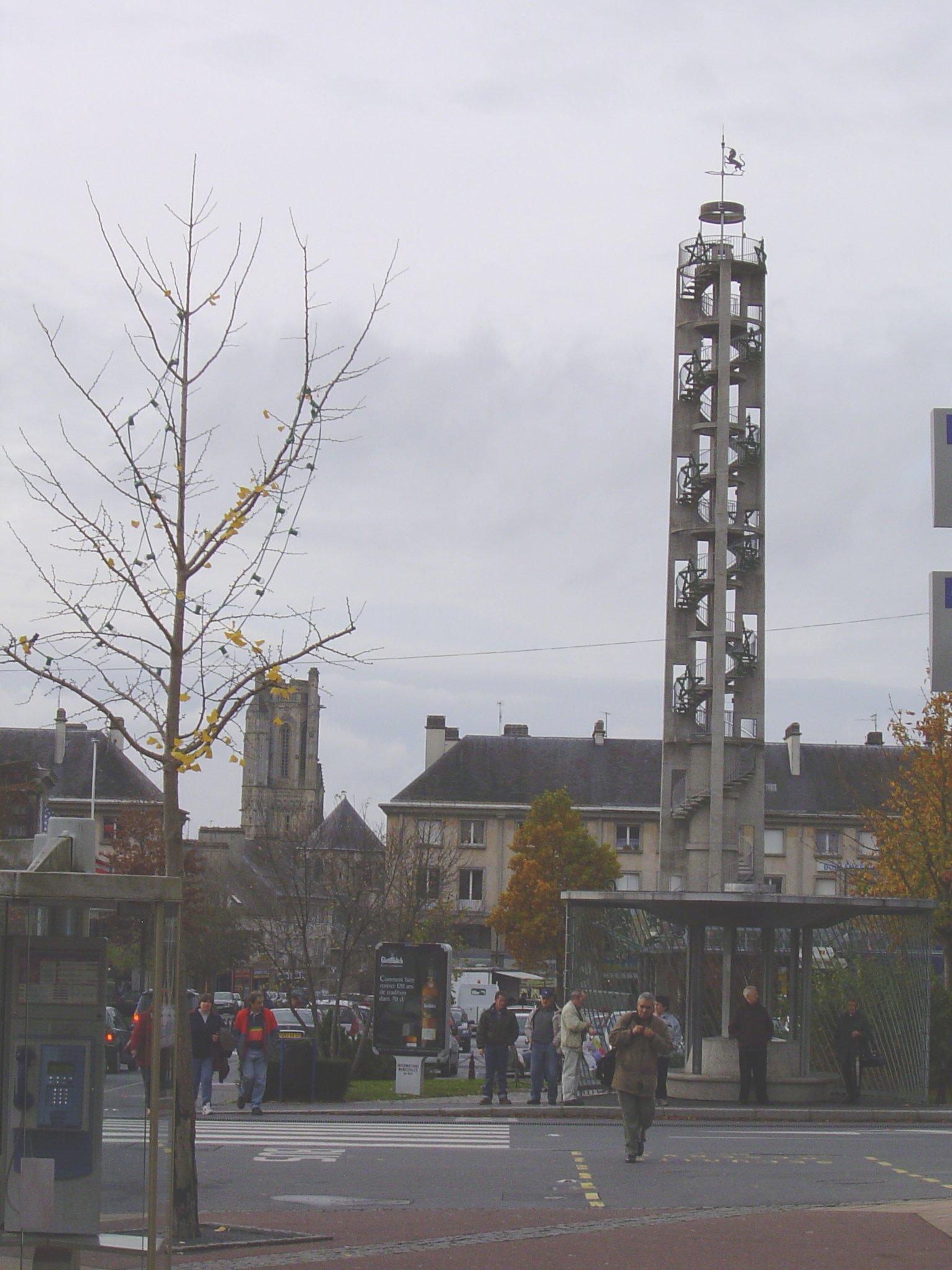
The belfry of the square

Saint-Lô was rebuilt. The dominant style was a neo-regionalist functionalism which was dominated by concrete. Its dated and monotonous character was soon criticised. If this choice, dictated by the circumstances and the immediate problems of the housing of Saint-Lô, leaves regrets today, it makes Saint-Lô, on a smaller scale than Le Havre or Lorient, one of the most striking testimonies of the reconstruction period. A few streets contain vestiges of the old Saint-Lô: some houses on the Rue du Neufbourg, Rue Croix-Canuet and Falourdel, Rue Saint-Georges and Porte au Four. This last street houses the last medieval way of Saint-Lô. In 1964, Saint-Lô absorbed two neighbouring communes, Sainte-Croix-de-Saint-Lô (660 inhabitants in 1962, to the east of the territory) and Saint-Thomas-de-Saint-Lô (306 inhabitants to the south). The town benefitted from the economic growth of the Trente Glorieuses and the population grew by 30% between 1968 and 1975. It built neighbourhoods of buildings in the Valley of the Dollée and Val Saint-Jean. The theatre, meanwhile, was inaugurated in 1963.

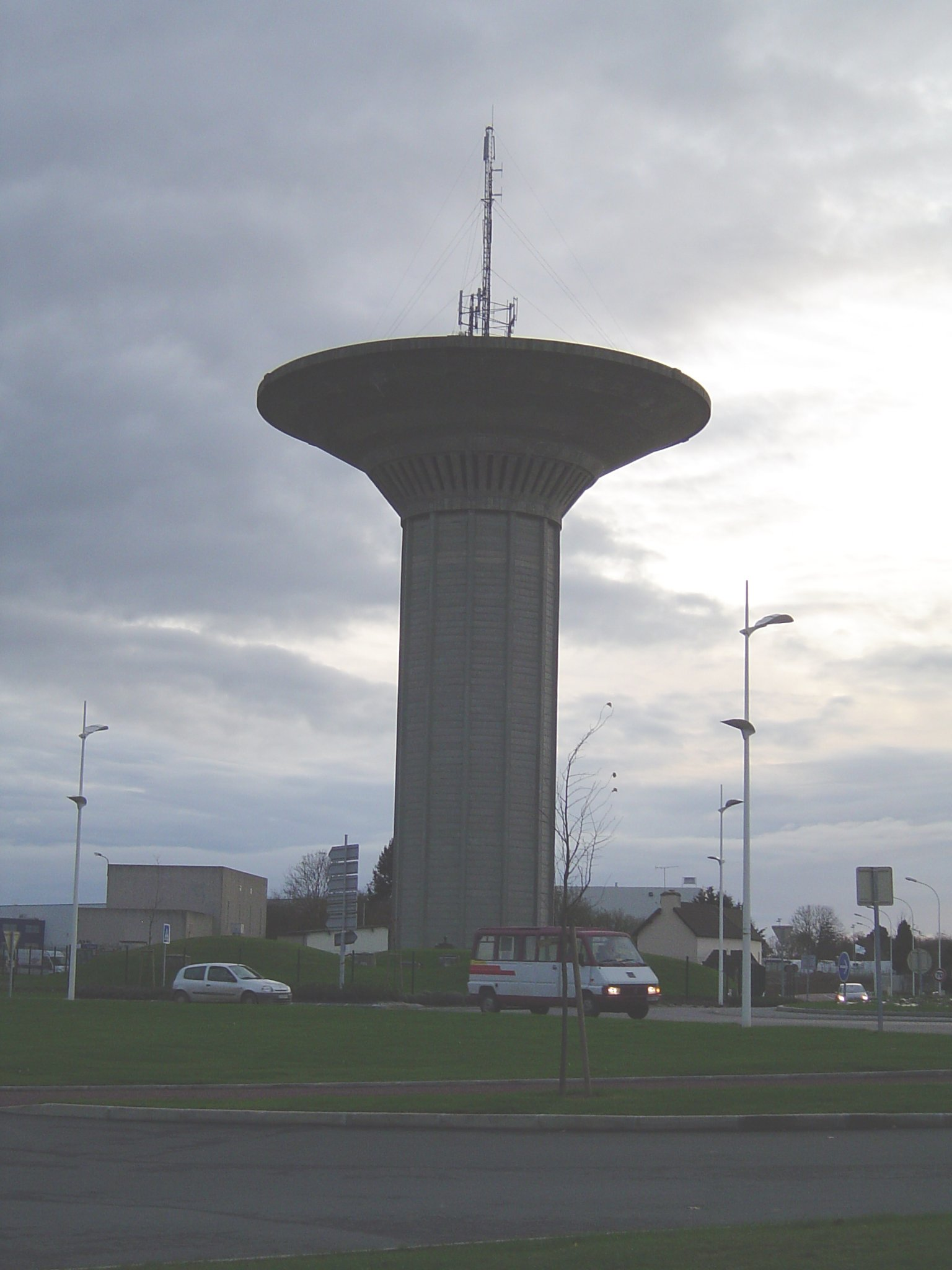
The Des Ronchettes water tower

The square of the town hall was completely redeveloped in the 1990s. The city organised a large demonstration on the occasion of the fiftieth anniversary of the Normandy landings. The edges of the Vire were reconfigured with the rehabilitation of the towpath and the creation of a green beach, at the Place du Quai-à-Tangue. A scow was rebuilt and crossed the river, in order to remember former river traffic. In 2004, the rural area of Bois-Jugan was urbanised, with the creation of housing within a framework of preservation of green spaces and a large aquatic centre. Later, the Des Ronchettes water tower was built following an unusual method for the time, since the tank (strongly resembling a flying saucer) was built at the ground level, then raised by a system of jacks, as the rings composing its body were manufactured. As such, its elevation allows a mounting point for telecommunication (mobile phone, WiMAX, and FM radio) networks.

== Politics and administration ==
=== List of mayors ===
==== During the Revolution ====
For the revolutionary period, the destruction of most of the archives does not allow a definitive result.

List of mayors of Saint-Lô, 1784–1799
Start	End	Name	Party	Other details
1784	July 1789	François Bertrand de Bacilly de la Ponterie (Note: Coming from a family ennobled in 1698, he received Louis XVI at Saint-Lô in 1786)		
July 1789	Late 1789	Pierre Louis Denier des Fresnes (Note: He was first advisor of the king and lieutenant particular criminal assessor at the Bailiwick of Saint-Lô. Then Mayor of Saint-Lô and commissioner of the executive directory for courts to the department.) (1751–1797)		
Late 1789	November 1790	Jacques-Michel-François Oury de Boisval		
November 1790	?	Antoine Vieillard de Boismartin (Note: Lawyer and playwright, he brought regularity to the finances of the city and established the Champ de Mars and the Place des Beaux-Regards.) (1747–1815)		
?	November 1791	M. Dubuisson		National militia captain in 1789
November 1791	3 December 1792	Jacques-Michel-François Oury de Boisval		
3 December 1792	8 January 1794	Antoine Vieillard de Boismartin (Note: Boismartin was revoked in 1794 for mourning at the death of Louis XVI.)		
8 January 1794	?	Jacques-Michel-François Oury de Boisval		
?	1799	Jean-Baptiste Antoine Bernard (Note: Jean-Baptiste Antoine Bernard was a member of the administration of the department in 1791 then First Counsel of the King for the Bailiwick. He was also a member of the council of the department in November 1792, gave his resignation on account of incompatibility and suspended in September 1793 to cause of federalism) (1815)		

==== Empires and Restoration ====
List of mayors of Saint-Lô, 1799–1870
Start	End	Name	Party	Other details
1799	1803	François-Alexandre-Léonor Le Jolis de Villiers (Note: Officer and moralist, he met Napoleon in Corsica. The city was in debt, so he made many reforms and quickly restored the economic balance. The city council voted funds for the development of his study, but he decided to use this money to pave the site of the fish market. He was later a deputy between 1817 and 1824.) (1760–1845)		
1803	1811	Louis Alexandre Félix Guillot		
1811	February 1815	Antoine Vieillard de Boismartin		
1815	11 November 1818	Pierre Antoine Théodore Pinel de Vauval (1767–1848)		Avocate of Saint-Sauveur-le-Vicomte
11 November 1818	30 March 1832	Pierre Louis Clément (Note: Lawyer at the Paris Parliament, he became director of the department in 1796, then Secretary General of the Prefecture from 1800 to 1814 and deputy for Manche during the Hundred Days; he strove to beautify the city (rampe des Beaux-Regards, courthouse, urban works).) (1776–1852)		
30 March 1832	30 August 1840	Gilles Le Menuet de La Juganière (1773–1860)		Avocate and magistrate
30 August 1840	15 August 1843	Paul Louis Clément		
15 August 1843	6 March 1848	Pierre Philippe Lecardonnel (1792–1860)		
6 March 1848	20 June 1849	Paul Louis Clément		
20 June 1849	1868	Ernest Dubois (Note: Former county inspector of charitable institutions in Saint-Lô and stepfather of Octave Feuillet.) (1800–1873)		
1868	1870	Louis Auvray (Note: Auvray was timber merchant in Saint-Lô and president of the commercial court; he was elected deputy between 1869 and 1870.) (1808–1871)		Polytechnician

==== Third Republic ====
List of mayors of Saint-Lô, 1870–1944
Start	End	Name	Party	Other details
1870	7 February 1874	Auguste Houssin Dumanoir (Note: Auguste Houssin Dumanoir was councillor of Marigny between 1846 and 1852 and then of Saint-Lô until 1889.) (1808–1889)		Physician
7 February 1874	20 May 1888	Gustave Paul Rauline (Note: Rauline was, amongst others, a Bonapartist deputy from 1876 to 1904 and Vice President of the Académie d'Agriculture) (1822–1904)		
20 May 1888	20 December 1896	Henri Amiard (Note: Elected to the left, he was also sub-prefect of Cherbourg in 1870 then prefect of Creuse in 1871.) (1841–1896)		
20 December 1896	15 May 1904	Alfred Dussaux (1848–1915)	Avowed elected to the left	
15 May 1904	7 April 1907	Jules Dary (1839–...)	Elected to the left	Former merchant
7 April 1907	10 May 1908	René Thomas (1856–1937)	Elected to the right	Physician
10 May 1908	1915	Alfred Dussaux	Avowed elected to the left	
1915	1919	Auguste Leturc (1852–1924)		Doctor
1919	1925	Antoine Ludger (Note: Ludger left Saint-Lô in 1922 for Paris, leaving in the interim Dr. Lavoix.) (died in 1958)		Veterinarian
1925	1926	Émile Enault (1871–1926)		Director of the Journal de la Manche
1927	1929	Jules Herout (Note: Resigned for health reasons.)		Honorary head of division at the prefecture
1929	1944	Anésime Périer (1876–1958)		Trader

==== Since 1944 ====
In 1944, the municipal council was suspended and a municipal delegation, chaired by Georges Lavalley, was temporarily responsible for administering the city.

List of mayors of Saint-Lô, 1944–present
Start	End	Name	Party	Other details
18 May 1945	4 May 1953	Georges Lavalley (1894–1959)		Merchant
4 May 1953	29 March 1971	Henri Liébard (1909–1986)		Public works engineer
29 March 1971	31 March 1977	Jean Patounas (1916–1995)	RI	Surgeon
31 March 1977	11 March 1983	Bernard Dupuis (1937–2018)	PS	Agricultural engineer
11 March 1983	24 March 1989	Jean Patounas (1937–)	UDF-PR	Surgeon
24 March 1989	15 June 1995	Bernard Dupuis	PS	Agricultural engineer
15 June 1995	6 April 2014	François Digard (1948–2017)	UMP	Advertising consultant
6 April 2014	Incumbent	François Brière (1973–)	DVD	Professor of Law

== Demography ==
=== Demographic evolution ===
Historical population

Year	Pop.	±% p.a.
1793	7,304	—
1800	6,987	−0.63%
1806	7,601	+1.41%
1821	8,271	+0.56%
1831	8,421	+0.18%
1836	9,065	+1.48%
1841	8,951	−0.25%
1846	9,185	+0.52%
1851	9,682	+1.06%
1856	9,768	+0.18%
1861	9,810	+0.09%
1866	9,693	−0.24%
1872	9,287	−0.71%

Year	Pop.	±% p.a.
1876	9,706	+1.11%
1881	10,121	+0.84%
1886	10,580	+0.89%
1891	11,445	+1.58%
1896	11,121	−0.57%
1901	11,604	+0.85%
1906	12,181	+0.98%
1911	11,855	−0.54%
1921	10,661	−1.06%
1926	10,718	+0.11%
1931	10,985	+0.49%
1936	11,814	+1.47%
1946	6,010	−6.54%

Year	Pop.	±% p.a.
1954	11,778	+8.77%
1962	15,388	+3.40%
1968	18,615	+3.22%
1975	23,221	+3.21%
1982	23,212	−0.01%
1990	21,546	−0.93%
1999	20,090	−0.77%
2007	19,320	−0.49%
2012	18,931	−0.41%
2017	19,116	+0.19%
2023	19,471	+0.31%

From 1962 to 1999: Population without double counting; for the years following: municipal population.
Source: Ldh/EHESS/Cassini until 1999 and INSEE (1968-2023)

Demographic evolution of Sainte-Croix-de-Saint-Lô (absorbed in 1964)

Historical population

Year	Pop.	±%
1793	718	—
1800	750	+4.5%
1806	767	+2.3%
1821	820	+6.9%
1831	752	−8.3%
1836	706	−6.1%
1841	763	+8.1%

Year	Pop.	±%
1846	757	−0.8%
1851	765	+1.1%
1856	767	+0.3%
1861	739	−3.7%
1866	722	−2.3%
1872	715	−1.0%
1876	731	+2.2%

Year	Pop.	±%
1881	676	−7.5%
1886	676	+0.0%
1891	674	−0.3%
1896	682	+1.2%
1901	729	+6.9%
1906	744	+2.1%
1911	701	−5.8%

Year	Pop.	±%
1921	553	−21.1%
1926	608	+9.9%
1931	632	+3.9%
1936	607	−4.0%
1946	605	−0.3%
1954	658	+8.8%
1962	660	+0.3%

Number withheld from 1962: Population without double counting.
Source: EHESS

Demographic evolution of Saint-Thomas-de-Saint-Lô (absorbed in 1964)

Historical population

Year	Pop.	±%
1793	397	—
1800	411	+3.5%
1806	402	−2.2%
1821	316	−21.4%
1831	316	+0.0%
1836	288	−8.9%
1841	325	+12.8%

Year	Pop.	±%
1846	308	−5.2%
1851	325	+5.5%
1856	353	+8.6%
1861	307	−13.0%
1866	303	−1.3%
1872	330	+8.9%
1876	310	−6.1%

Year	Pop.	±%
1881	305	−1.6%
1886	286	−6.2%
1891	270	−5.6%
1896	312	+15.6%
1901	282	−9.6%
1906	276	−2.1%
1911	266	−3.6%

Year	Pop.	±%
1921	250	−6.0%
1926	278	+11.2%
1931	283	+1.8%
1936	266	−6.0%
1946	339	+27.4%
1954	328	−3.2%
1962	306	−6.7%

Number withheld from 1962: Population without double counting.
Source: EHESS

=== Age structure ===
The population of Saint-Lô is younger than that of Manche, especially the age group 15-24 is larger.

Population by age of Saint-Lô, 2023 (%)

80+	7.6
65–79	16.5
55–64	12
40–54	17.8
25–39	16.8
15–24	15.1
0–14	14.2

Total: 100

male

female

Source: INSEE

Population by age of Manche, 2023 (%)

90+	8
75–89	18.5
60–74	14.5
45–59	18.4
30–44	15.4
15–29	9.7
0–14	15.4

Total: 99.9

male

female

Source: INSEE

== Heraldry ==
Arms of Saint-Lô	The arms of Saint-Lô are blazoned : Gules, a unicorn salient argent, on a chief azure, three fleurs de lys Or. Comments: The unicorn symbolises the purity of the Virgin Mary to whom the city was consecrated. The fleurs-de-lis were granted by King Louis XI to thank Saint-Lô for its loyalty to the Crown of France. Also found, in place of the chief of France, is a quarter of azure with the star of argent.

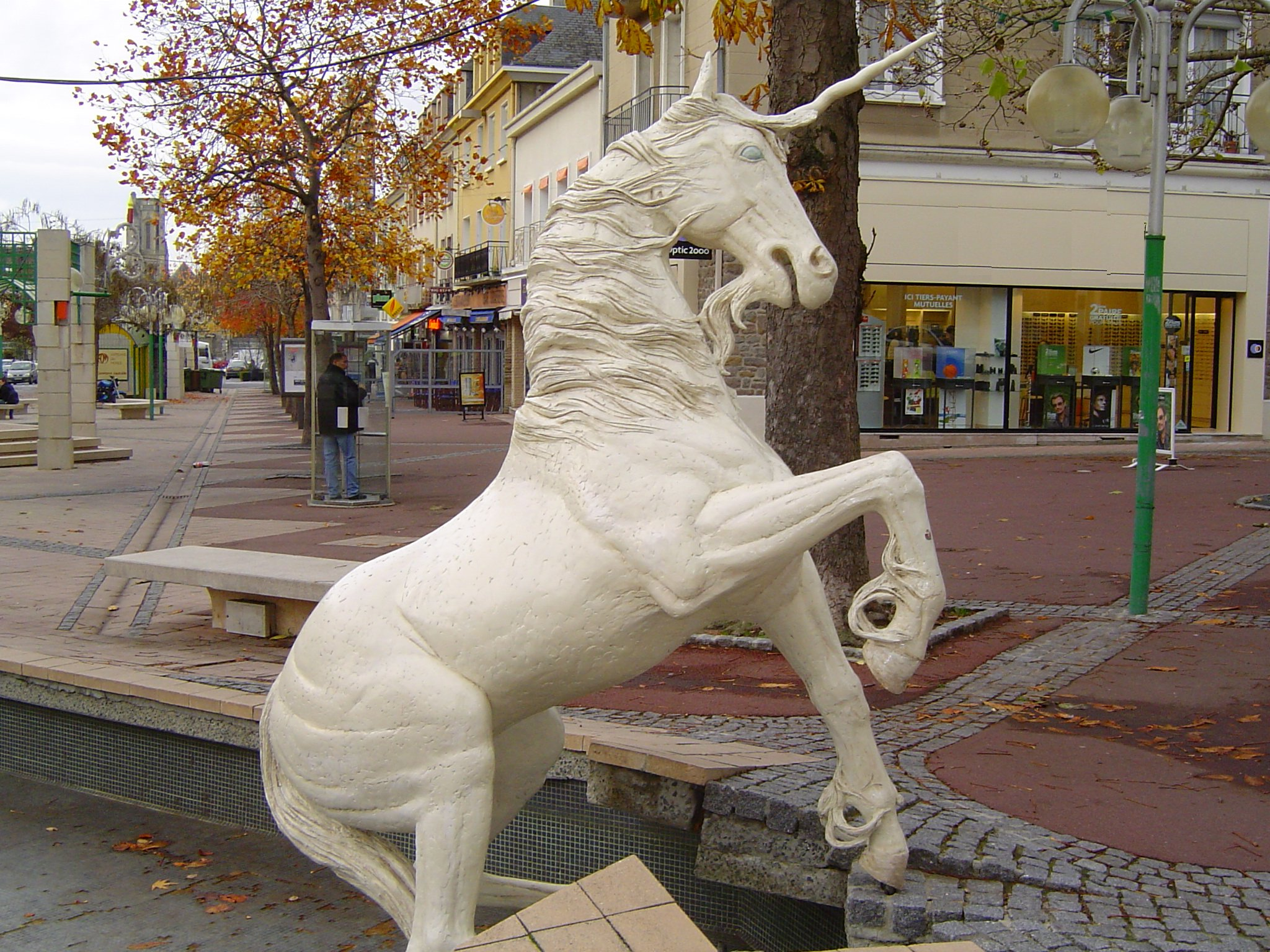
Statue of the unicorn of Saint-Lô.

Arms of Saint-Lô	Gules, a passing unicorn argent, to shield quartered azure, charged with a capital N Or topped with a star Or. During the First Empire, the city was granted another coat of arms, according to Victor Adolphe Malte-Brun.

Arms of Saint-Lô	Full arms of the city of Saint-Lô.

== Economy ==
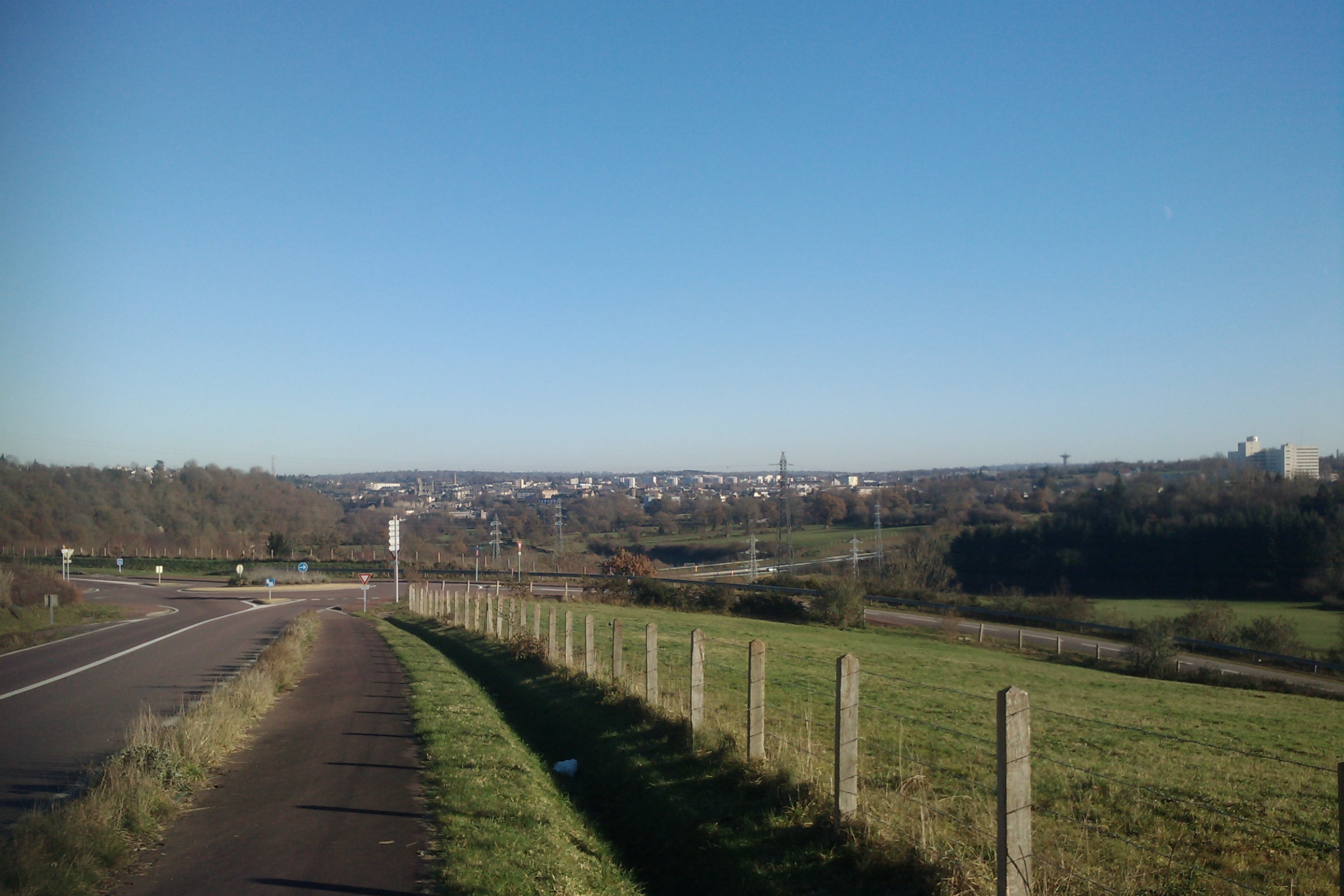
View of Saint-Lô, from the slopes of the River Vire.

The city, at a crossroads between Caen, Cherbourg and Rennes, has a natural vocation of marketplace in the centre of the Manche bocage. A city of craftsmen and trade, which owes part of its prosperity to its status of prefecture, it has experienced a late industrialisation and attempts to assert its place, today, in the regional agri-food industry. Despite this, the Saint-Lô country became one of the less industrial areas of the region. Its unemployment rate of 6.7% also hides an exodus of young workers to the area of Caen and Rennes. The entry into service of the RN 174 helped open up the centre of Manche and create a new industrial zone (ZAC Neptune).

In 2008, Saint-Lô was equipped with fibre optic cable to allow companies and individuals to have very high speed internet (approximately 1 Gbps and 100 Mbit/s for individuals). Companies should have had access to this speed by September 2008, with individuals not before September 2009. Saint-Lô will be one of the first cities in France of this size to be equipped with a fibre optic internet network.

=== Tax rate ===
Data in %	2002	2003	2004	2005	2006	2007	2008	2009	2010
Housing tax	14.08	14.08	14.08	14.08	14.08	14.08	14.08	14.08	14.08
Household waste				08.49		08.49			
Built land tax			17.81	17.81	17.81	17.81	17.81	17.81	17.81
Unbuilt land tax			39.71	39.71	39.71	39.71	39.71	39.71	39.71
Business tax				12.17	12.17	12.17	12.17		

=== Industries ===
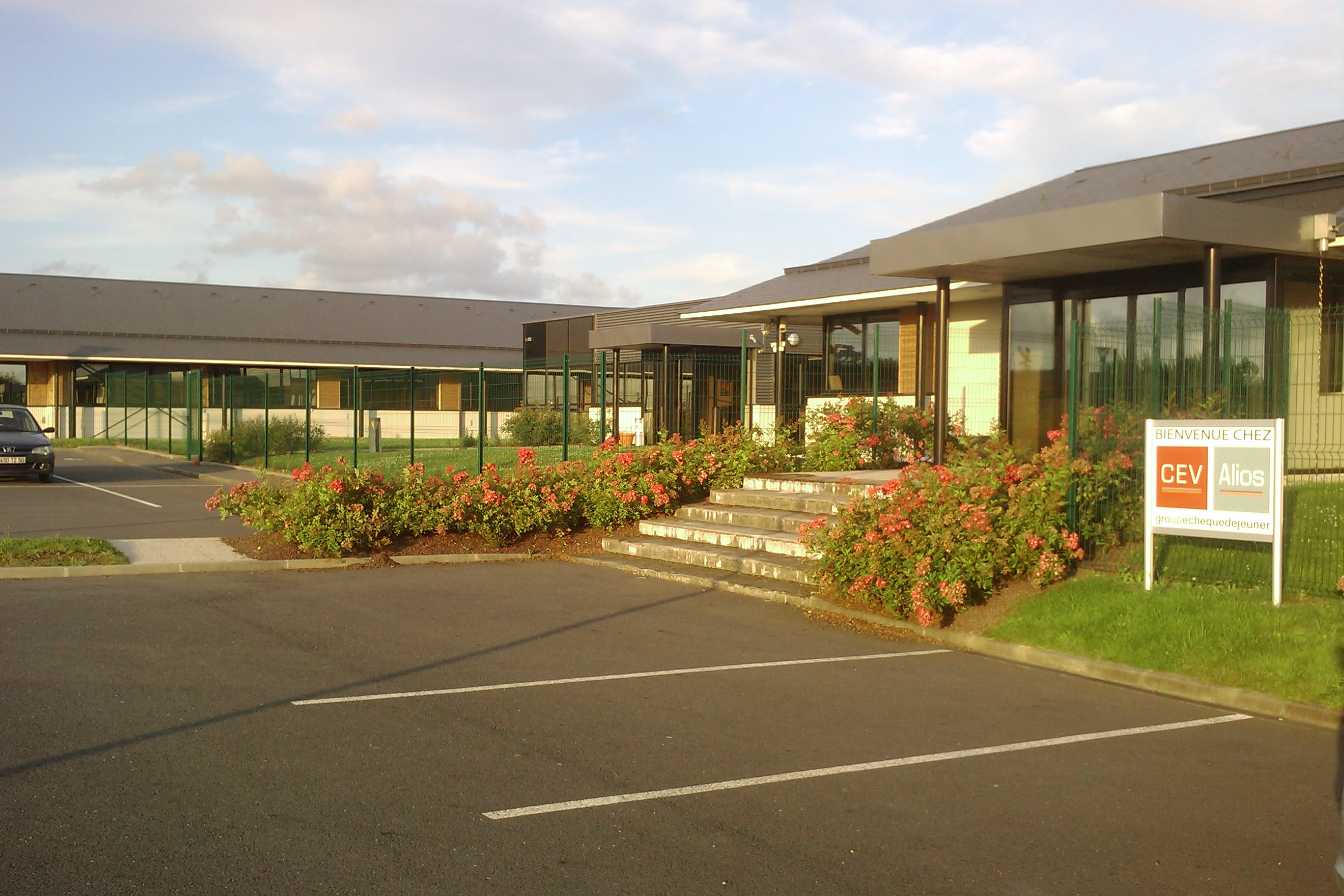
CEV Group-Alios

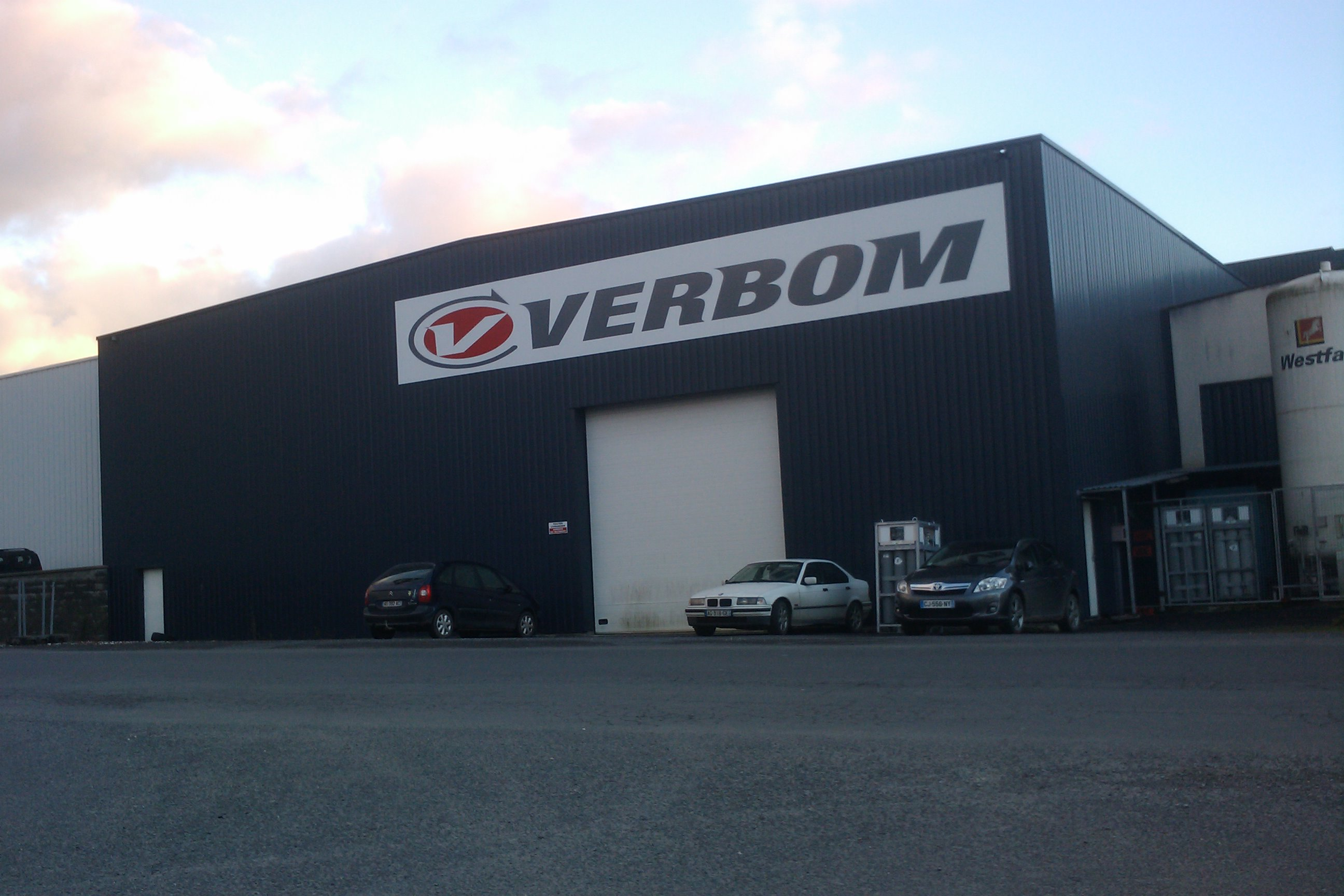
Verbom

- Lecapitaine: Manufacturer of automotive bodywork and refrigeration, a subsidiary of Petit Forestier (320 employees – €33M turnover).
- Moulinex: The Moulinex factory has long been the largest plant in Saint-Lô. When the group went bankrupt in 2004, the factory was a subsidiary of SEB, and general company for electric motors was revived as Euromoteurs, with SEB as the only customer. Part of the production lines were dismantled, sold to China and resettled there by the Green de Gourfaleur company. The Saint-Lô site had 150 employees and manufactured small and medium power electric motors. Suffering from only having the single client SEB, Euromoteurs was put into liquidation in 2007.
- Alios, production plant which manufactures smart cards and CEV, a company that manages electronic transactions, grouped in the same building (80 employees) and subsidiaries of the Group Chèque Déjeuner. It is one of the key players in the Secure Electronic Transactions competitive cluster.
- MT Verbom, company specialising in press tools. Created in 1985 on the Promenade des ports, the Martignoni-Traisnel company specialises in the production of auto parts, and moved in 1990 into the Chevallerie zone. In 1998 the company became closer with Canadian group Verbom and employed 65 people on the site in 2008.

=== Tertiary sector ===
The town of Saint-Lô is very oriented towards services, thus since the fall of Moulinex, the France-United States Memorial Hospital became the first employer in the city. There are many jobs in administration related to its status of prefecture. Its location in the heart of the bocage allows it to sustain services connected historically with agriculture: It may be noted the presence of one of the seats of the Crédit agricole of Normandy, whose closure was announced in June 2010, but also the insurer Groupama, clearly visible from the Major Howie roundabout, and Mutualité sociale agricole. Finally, many businesses have developed along the ring road.

=== Agriculture and agro-food hub ===
The city hosts activities associated with the rearing of cattle and horses. Each week, a calf market took place in the market installed until 30 December 2008 near Les Ronchettes. From January 2009, it was removed and attached to the calf market at Torigni-sur-Vire. The city also has the Livestock Promotion Centre, located next to the stud farm, which hosts the equestrian competition of the Normandy horse show, each year in August. The agri-food cluster has developed since 1990 with the aim of hosting companies in this sector, several public or parapublic bodies are installed:

- Adria normandie: technical advice centre for agro-processing.
- The agri-food nursery.
- Lilano: Laboratoire interprofessionnel laitier de Normandie [Inter-professional dairy laboratory of Normandy].
- The Centre of agri-food formation of Saint-Lô, an extension of the Thère Farming School located at Le Hommet-d'Arthenay.
- Ardefa: Association régionale pour le développement de l'emploi et des formations dans les industries alimentaires [Regional Association for the development of employment and training in the food industries.]
- Workshop of agri-food rotation.
- The agri-food park of Saint-Georges-Montcocq / Le Mesnil-Rouxelin on which the master dairies are established; through lack of implementation, much remains undeveloped.

In 2008, the only success in the agri-food field was the success of the France Kebab enterprise, which had won many prizes in 2007.

=== Media ===
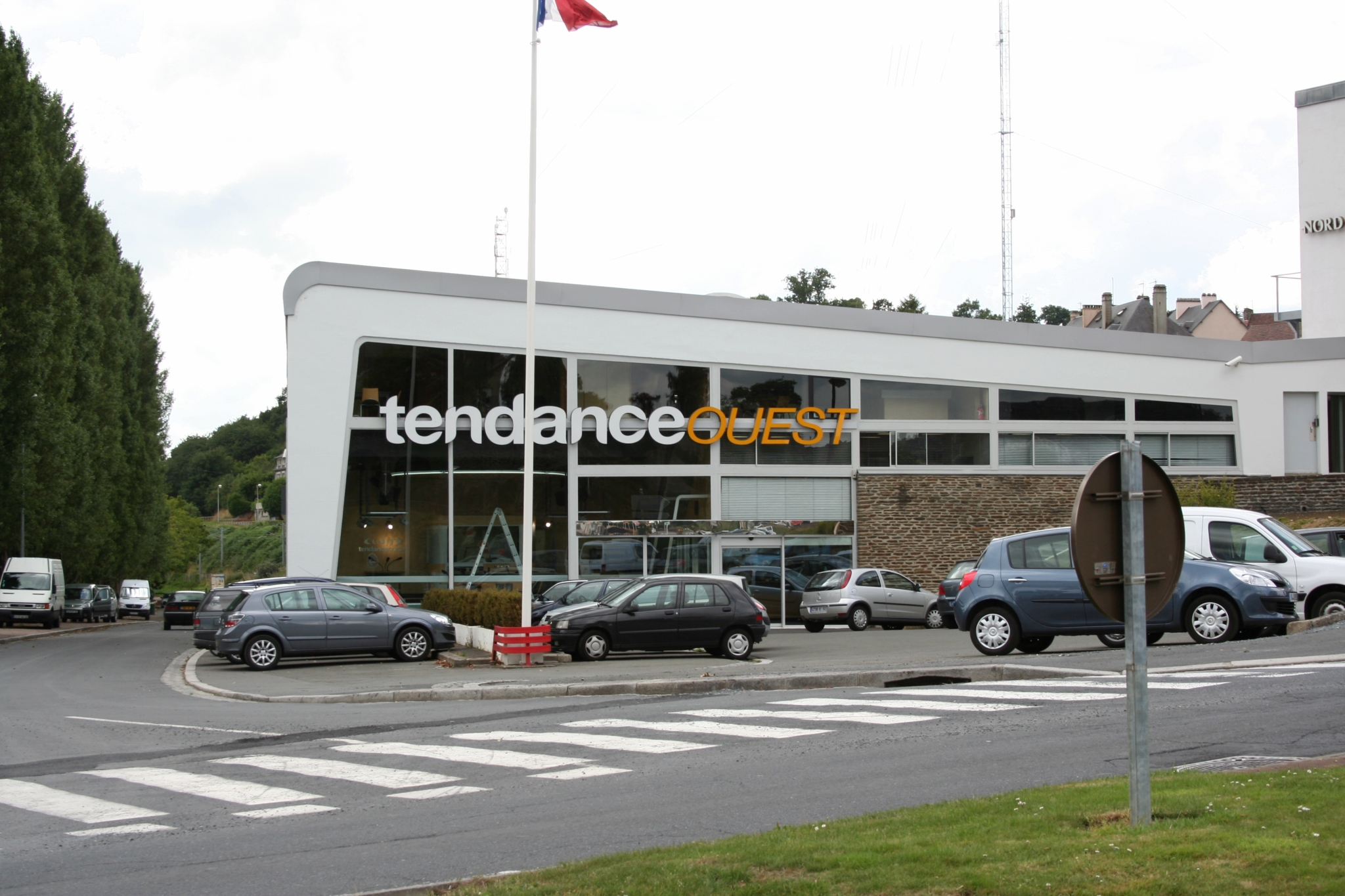
The studio of Tendance Ouest.

Several regional media are disseminated in Saint-Lô and have an office.

- La Manche libre (weekly newspaper), headquarters
- Ouest-France (daily press), departmental daily
- La Presse de la Manche (daily press)
- Tendance Ouest, formerly Radio Manche (radio)
- France Bleu Cotentin (radio)

== Education ==
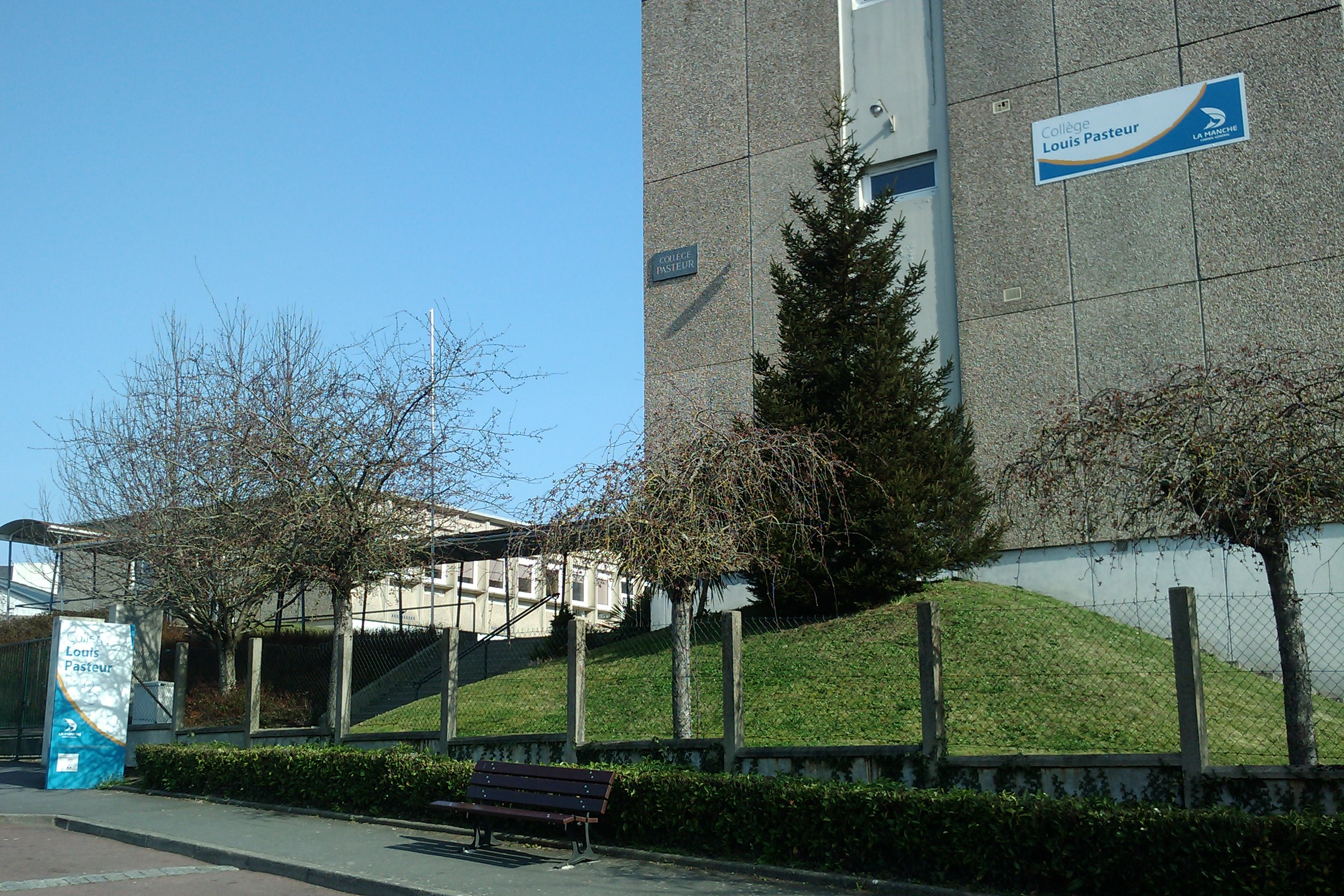
Louis-Pasteur College

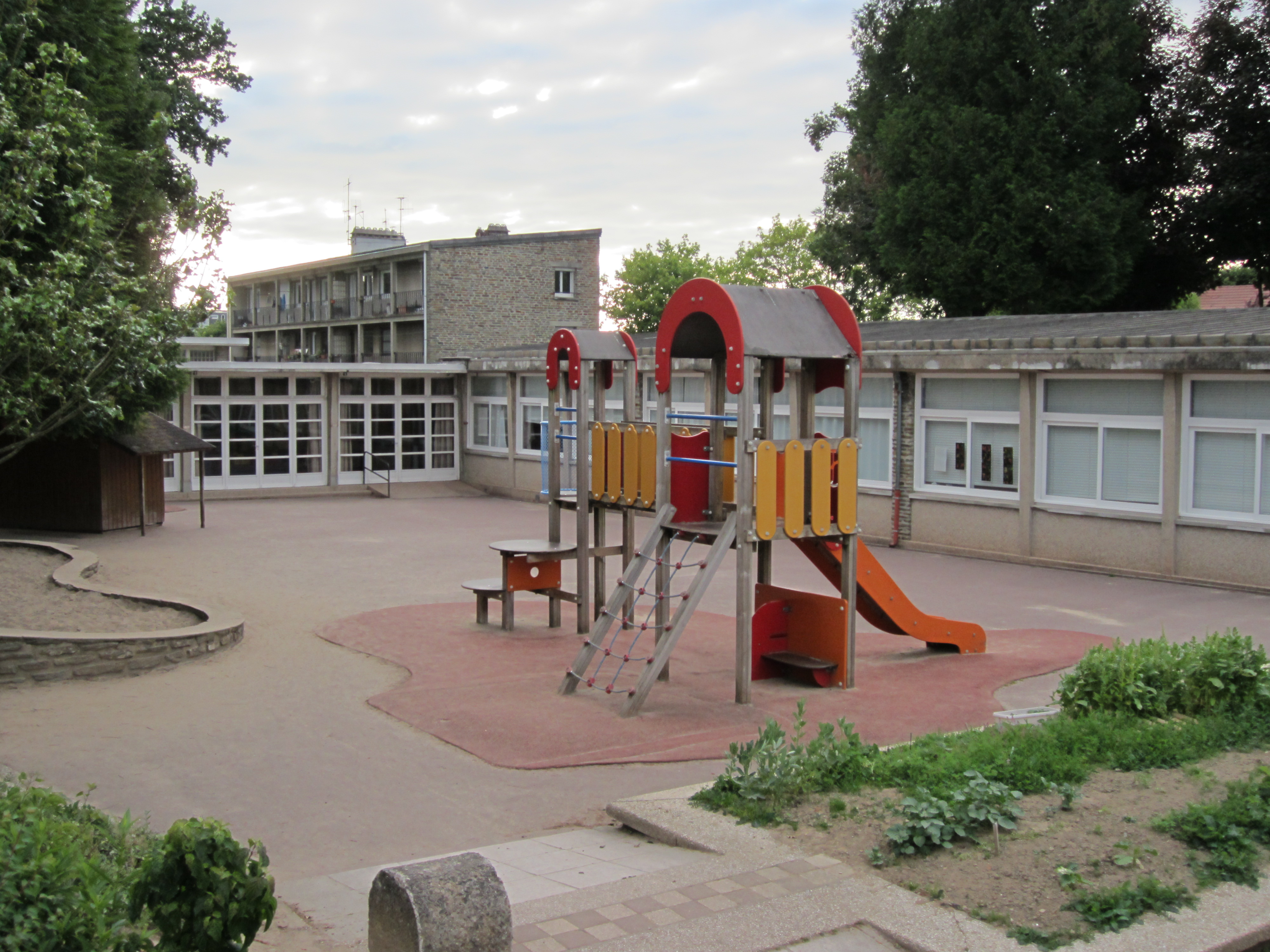
Raymond-Brulé School

The city of Saint-Lô falls within the Academy of Caen.

Level	Public establishments	Private establishments
School	Primary school of the Aurore; Raymond-Brulé primary school Calmette-et-Guérin primary school Jules-Verne primary school Jules-Ferry primary school Gendrin nursery and primary schools School complex of the Yser	Sainte-Jeanne-d'Arc School (interparish); Sainte-Geneviève School (Bon-Sauveur)
College	Collège Georges-Lavalley : 371 pupils Collège Louis-Pasteur : 458 pupils	Collège du Bon-Sauveur; Collège interparoissial
High school	Lycée Pierre-et-Marie-Curie : 903 pupils Lycée Urbain-Le Verrier : 803 pupils Lycée Camille-Corot : 347 pupils	Lycée Bon-Sauveur
Further education	National Conservatory of Arts and Crafts; National School dairy industry technological hall School of Management and Business; Graduate School of agribusiness executives ESIX Normandie; Nursing Training Institute; IUFM; IUT	

=== University Institute of Technology ===
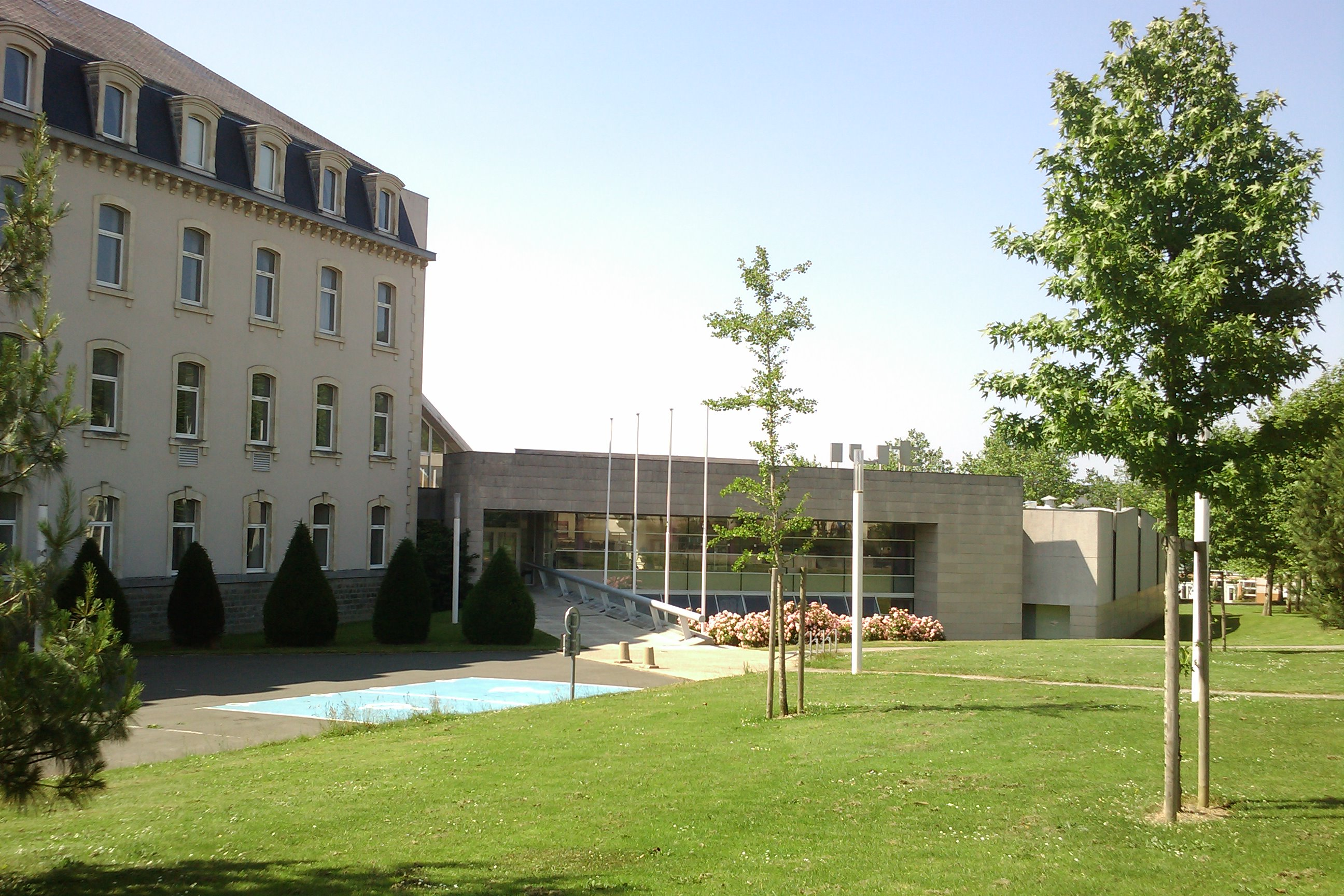
The Saint-Lô branch of the IUT

The site of Saint-Lô is a component of the IUT of Cherbourg-Manche which offers the following courses:

- DUT Multimedia Professions and the Internet
- DUT Thermal Engineering and Energy
- Professional licence, development and protection of the cultural heritage, option virtual reality and multimedia training
- Professional licence, management maintenance and industrial exploitation.

A part of the Groupe FIM, training organisation of the CCI of Centre Sud-Manche and that of Cherbourg.

=== School of Management and Commerce ===
The School of Management and Commerce of Saint-Lô was established in 1988 under the auspices of the FIM Group and is currently headed by Yves Ricolleau. A member of the national network of the EGC, the school offers post-BAC training consisting of three years of responsible marketing, commercialisation and management. The school gains about 40 new students each year.

== Garrisons ==
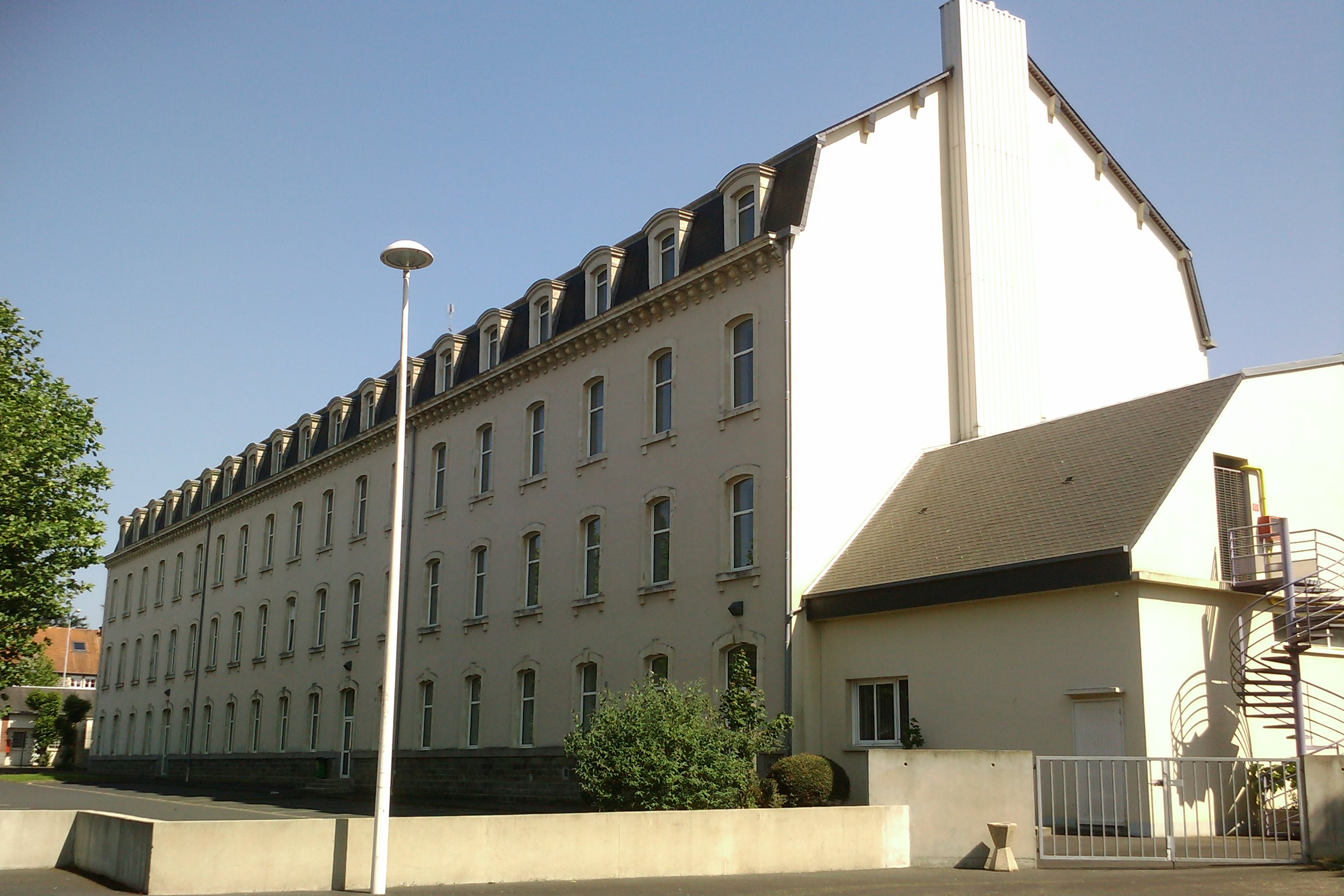
Bellevue barracks

Saint-Lô has been the site of various garrisons at the Bellevue barracks:

- ? – 1923 : 3 battalions (1st, 2nd and 3rd) of the 136th Infantry Regiment
- 1924–1929 : 1st Battalion of the 1st Colonial
- 1929–1939 : 8th Infantry Regiment
- ? – ? : 208th Infantry Regiment
- 1963 – ? : 512th Transport Group, coming from Constantine
- 1978–1984 : 1st RIMA

== Culture ==
=== Facilities ===
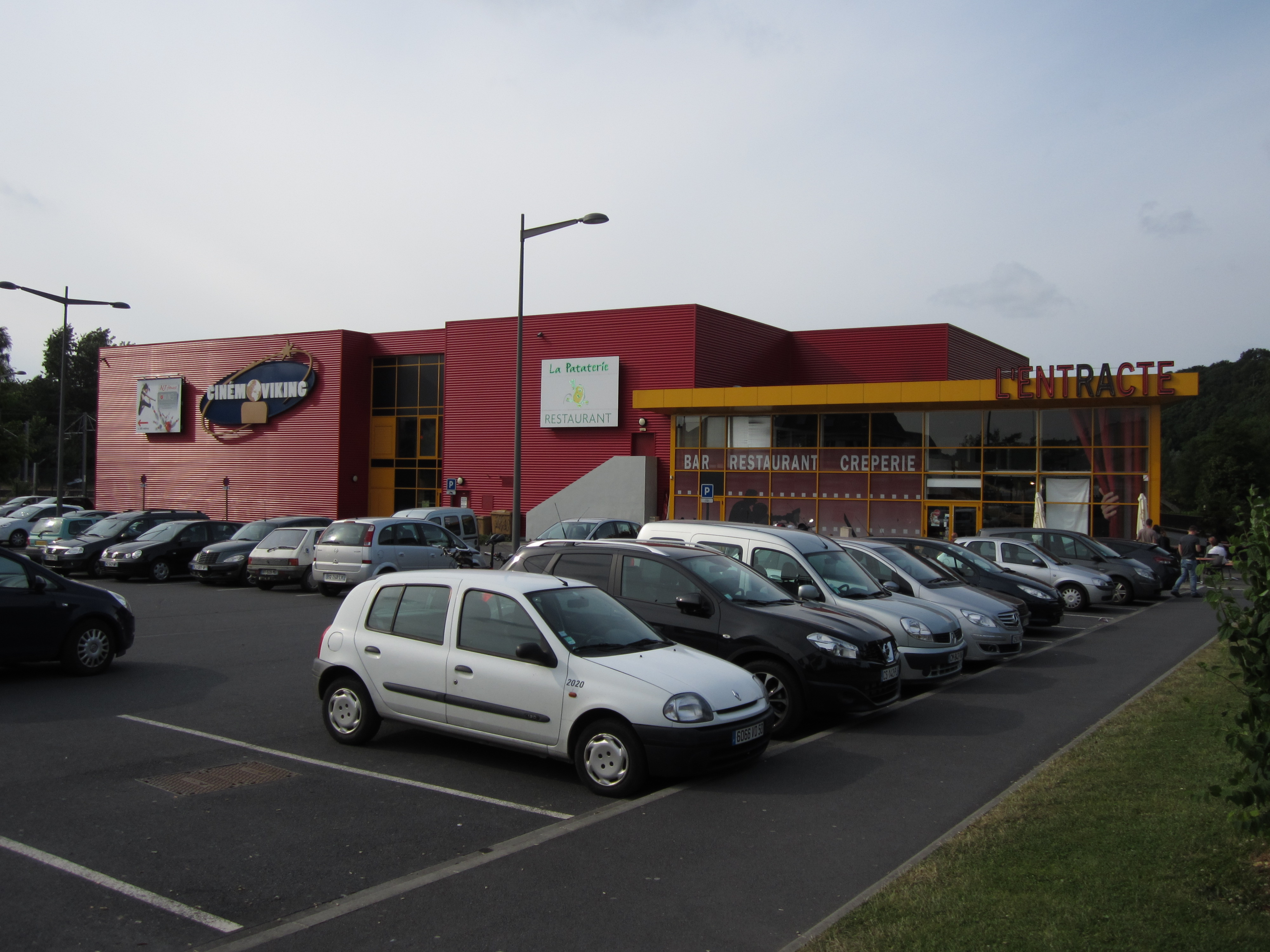
The Cinémoviking cinema

- The Jean Lurçat Cultural Centre: media library, museum of fine arts, auditorium, drawing school and community building.
- Municipal music school
- The Roger Ferdinand Theatre
- The Normandy: concert hall for current music
- Lieu Pluri-artistique Art Plume [Multi-artistic Pen Art Place] in the Valley of the Dollée
- The cinema Cinemoviking, on Esplanade Jean-Grémillon.

The Cinemoviking cinema opened on 1 April 2009, and was the first cinema of Lower Normandy to offer 3D films.

=== Events ===
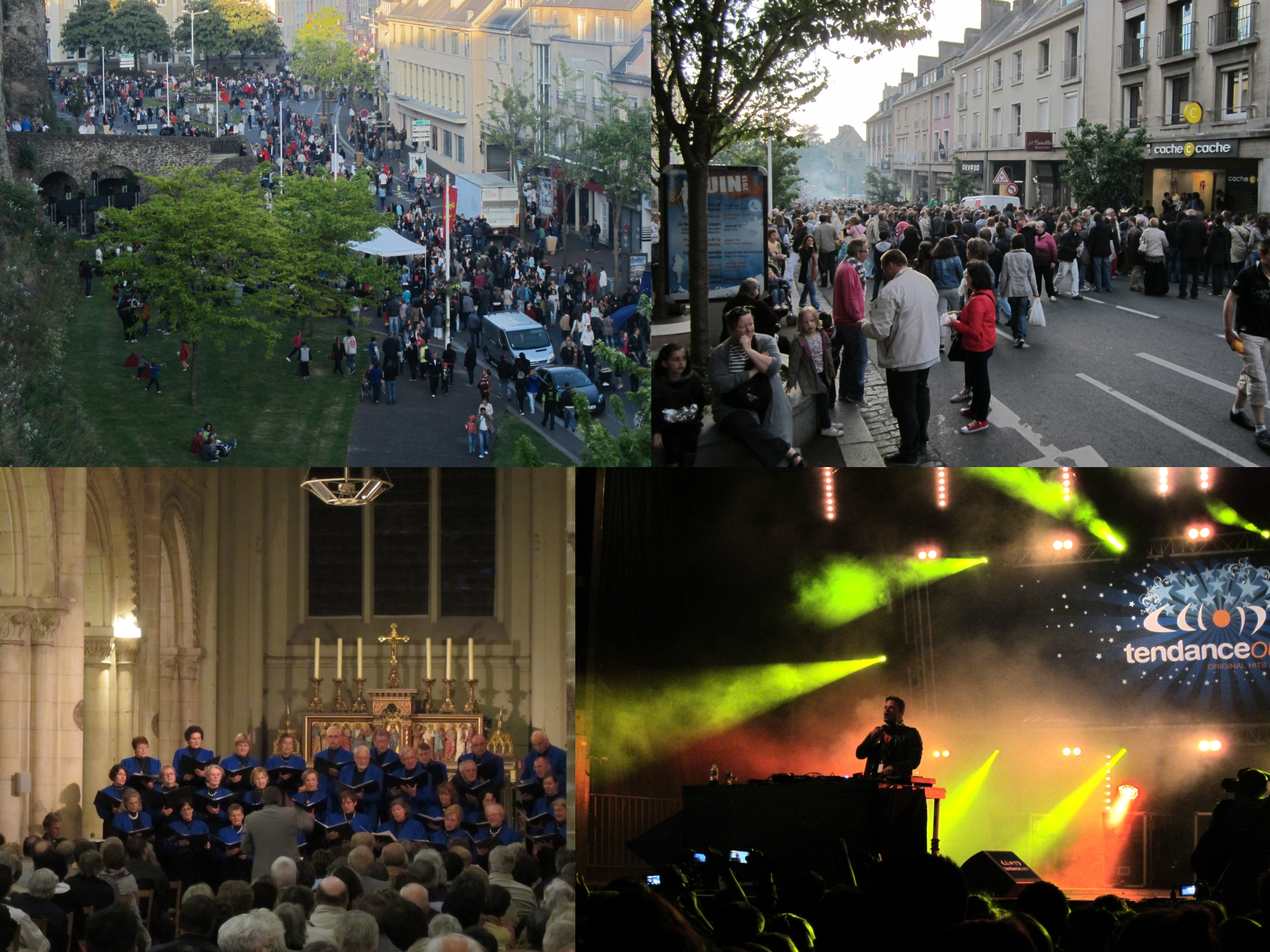
Fête de la musique 2013, in Saint-Lô.

- Asian Culture Festival and manga (in February)
- Housing fair: Parc des expos (late February)
- The Hétéroclites (in June): Street theatre, acrobatics, music, in the bucolic atmosphere of the Valley of the Dollée.
- Festival of the Vire: At the Plage verte (last weekend in June)
- Festival of music with the Tendance Live Show organised by Tendance Ouest
- Chess Festival (early July) Festival
- Criterium of the ramparts of Saint-Lô: Around the Enclos (last Wednesday of July)
- The Jeudis du haras [Thursdays of the Stud]: Saint-Lô stud farm (July and August)
- Normandy horse show: equine complex (August)
- Foire aux Croûtes et à la brocante [Fair of the Crusts and of the flea market]: City centre (in September): exhibition and sale of paintings of local artists and garage sale
- Polyfollia: Choral festival (October, biennial; ended in 2014)
- Challenges de la ville de Saint-Lô de tir [Challenges of the city of Saint-Lô of shooting] (rifle, pistol and field crossbow) organised annually by Saint-Lô shooting club at the Salle Saint-Ghislain on the Rue de l'Exode, the second weekend of October.
- Fair of Saint-Lô: Parc des expos (October)
- National stallion competition (October)
- Sonic Meetings (in November), music festival

== Personalities linked to the commune ==
=== Births ===
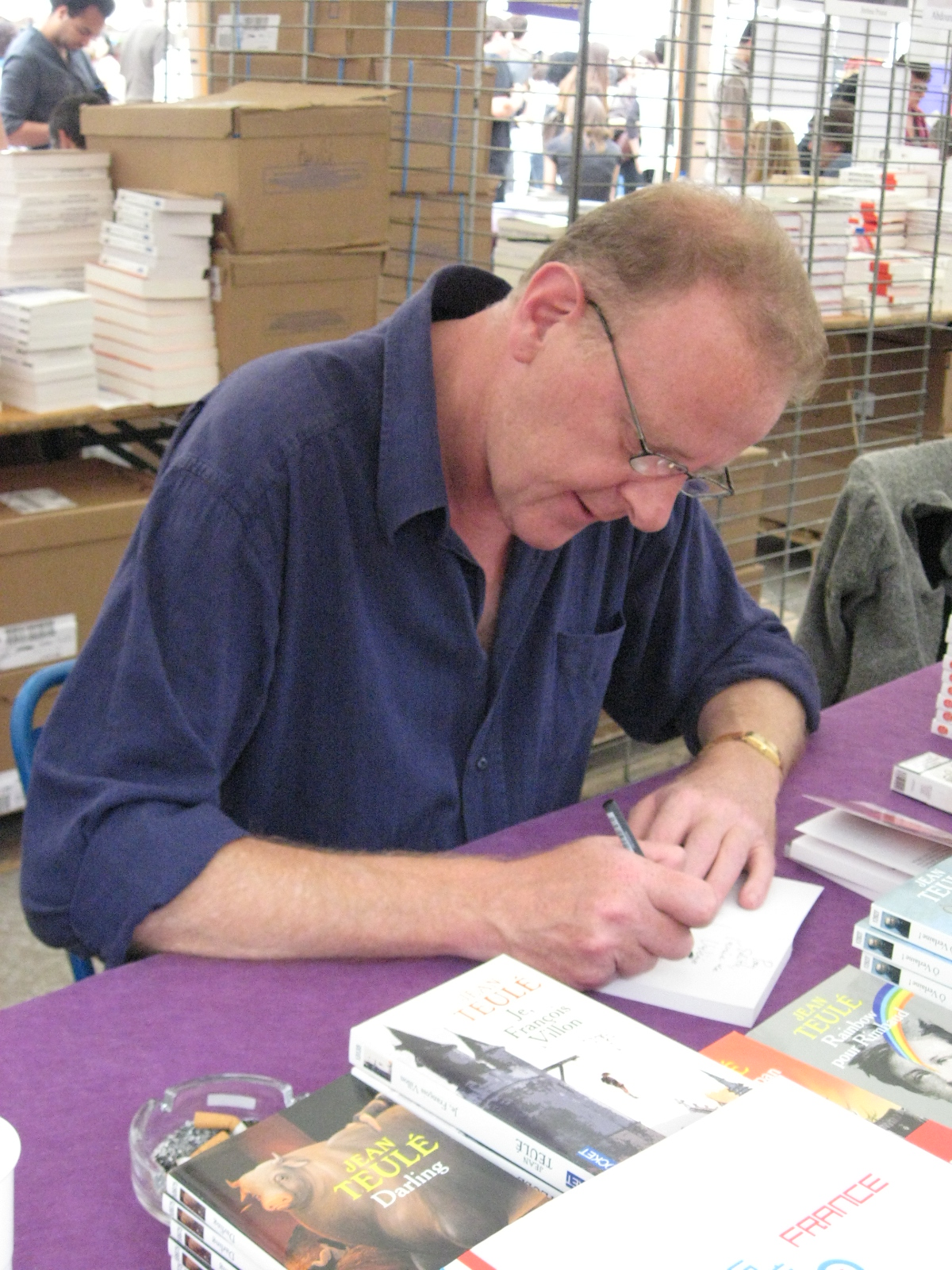
Jean Teulé, French novelist and native of Saint-Lô.

- Jacques Davy Duperron (1556–1618), poet and diplomat.
- Daniel Saint (1778–1847), miniaturist of the 19th century.
- Urbain Le Verrier (1811–1877), astronomer and mathematician, born in Saint-Lô where he spent the first years of his childhood. A plaque is installed at the Place du Champ-de-Mars on the building where he lived.
- Alexandre Blanchet (1819–1867), physician
- Leonor Couraye du Parc (1820–1893), legal and artistic personality of Manche and grandson of the last Viscount Granville, François Léonor Couraye du Parc.
- Octave Feuillet (1821–1890), writer, was born and died in Saint-Lô. His birthplace is 2 Rue Saint-Georges. A novelist and playwright who gained success under the Second Empire, he was considered a 'bourgeois writer' of that era and was elected to the Académie française when 40 years old.
- Valérie Feuillet (1832–1906), woman of letters and wife of the previous
- Daniel de Losques (1880–1915), cartoonist
- Raymond Brulé (1897–1944), resistant, died during deportation
- Jacques Datin (1920–1973), composer who wrote for France Gall, Juliette Gréco, Serge Lama, Claude Nougaro, Édith Piaf, etc.
- Jean-Pierre Brulé (1929), director of IT companies, son of Raymond Brulé
- Michel Brulé (1932), son of Raymond Brulé
- Claude Rolley, (1933–2007), archaeologist, Emeritus Professor of the University of Burgundy, writer on the art of Gaul and ancient Greece, President of the Académie du Morvan
- Jean Teulé (1953), novelist, who also performed in film and on television
- Jacky Vimond (1961), first French motocross rider to become world champion in 1986
- Stéphane Puisney, designer writer
- Éric Levallois, gold medallist team rider at the 2002 FEI World Equestrian Games
- Florian Angot and Reynald Angot, riders of the team of France at the Olympic Games in Athens
- Alexis Loret (1975), actor who was in the film Mariages ! by Valérie Guignabodet
- Hugues Duboscq, French swimmer, bronze medallist in the 100m breaststroke at the 2004 and 2008 Summer Olympics
- Benoit Lesoimier, professional footballer who plays for Stade Brestois 29.
- Florian Geffrouais (1988), decathlete.

=== Others ===
- François Léonor Couraye du Parc (1746–1818), the last Viscount of Granville, died at Saint-Lô, where he was president of the court of first instance, on 30 August 1818
- Pierre Le Menuet de La Jugannière (1746–1835), deputy Mayor of Saint-Lô, public prosecutor and president of the Criminal Court of Manche, deputy of Manche in the Council of Ancients.
- Édouard-Léonor Havin (1755–1829), lawyer in Saint-Lô and member of the convention
- Louis Caillemer (1764–1827), military
- Pierre Yver (1768–1826), politician of Manche was a borough councillor of Saint-Lô under the Empire
- Jean Follain, author, devoted a book entitled Chef-lieu (1950), in Saint-Lô where he spent his adolescence. Many documents are gathered in the Museum of Fine Arts of the city
- Samuel Beckett, Nobel Prize winning writer, who enlisted as a steward at the Irish Hospital of Saint-Lô. He dedicated four lines which are today engraved at the entrance to the Museum of Fine Arts. (Note: "Vire will wind in other shadows (Les méandres de la Vire charrieront d'autres ombres), Unborn though the bright ways tremble (à venir qui vacillent encore dans la lumière des chemins), And the old mind ghost-forsaken (et le vieux crâne vidé de ses spectres), Sink into its havoc (se noiera dans son propre chaos).")
- Paul-Jacques Bonzon, youth novelist
- Albert II, current Prince of Monaco, who carries Baron of Saint-Lô amongst his many titles.
- Ant Middleton, the British former special forces soldier, TV personality and author, lived in the town with his family in the late 1980s and early 1990s.

== Sports ==
=== Sports disciplines ===
==== Football ====
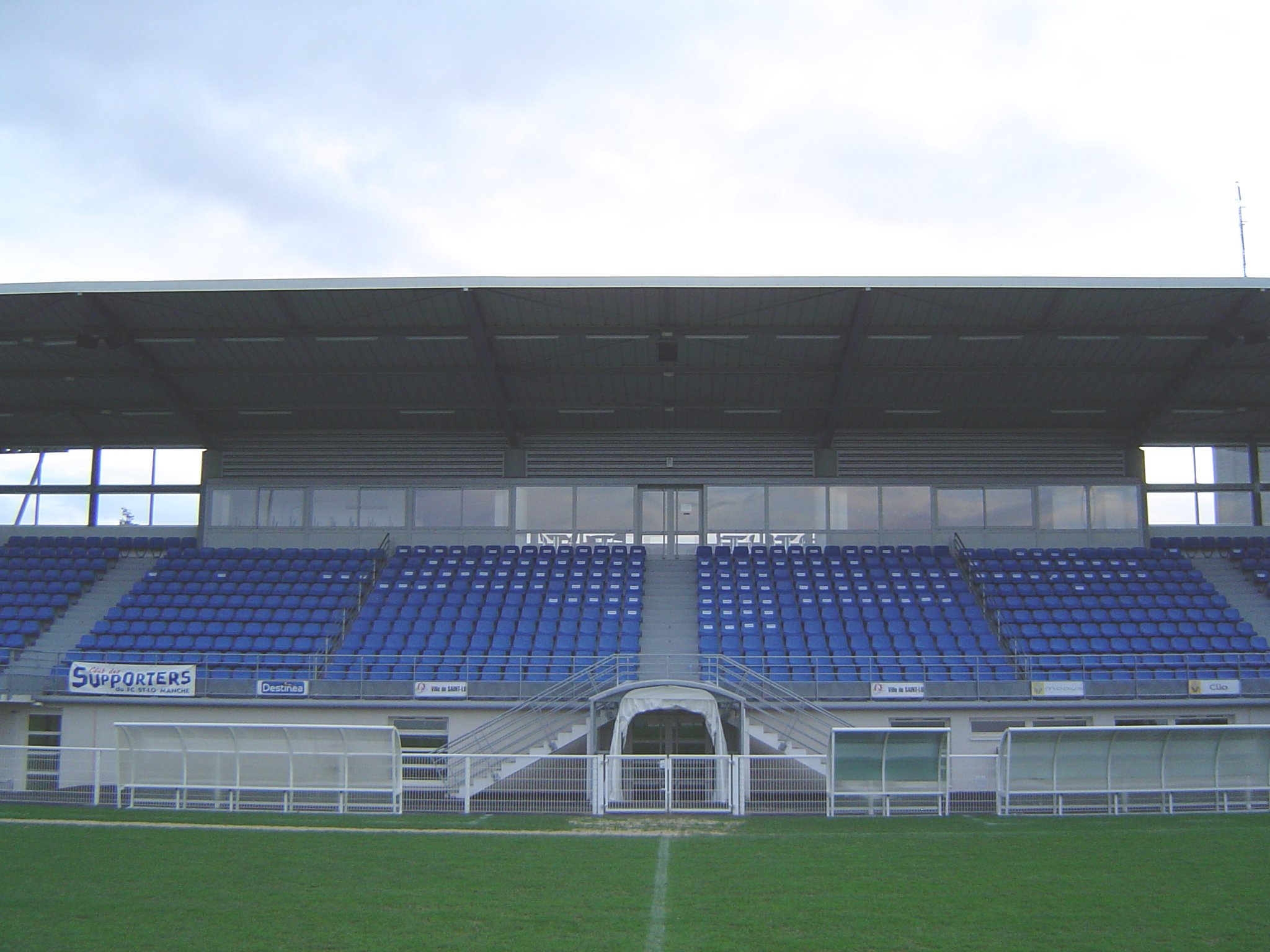
The Louis-Villemer Stadium

In 2014–2015, FC Saint-Lô Manche developed its team first in CFA 2 and two other teams in the League of Lower Normandy. In 2004, the club was playing in the CFA. The club home is the recently built Louis-Villemer Stadium.

The Union sportive Sainte-Croix-de-Saint-Lô develops a football team in the League of Lower Normandy and two others in district divisions.

==== Other sports clubs ====
- Jimmer's de Saint-Lô: Baseball team was twice champion of France (1996 and 1997). Evolving in the Championship of France elite in 2006, the club was dropped for the 2007 season for financial reasons and evolved at the regional level in 2008.
- The Normandy Horse Show is a major riding event for the promotion of the saddle horse. The annual event takes place around the week of 15 August.
- Team Nissan France Dessoude, directed by André Dessoude, participates in Rally raid Championship, including the Dakar Rally. In 2002, he hired Johnny Hallyday.
- ASPTT Saint-Lô Handball inhabited the French Championship of handball National 3 in 2012.
- Saint-Lô Rugby Club.
- Saint-Lô shooting club, formerly Buffalo Club, created 4 August 1952; the main shooting stand is located at 91 Rue Poterne to the level of the Tour des Beaux-Regards in the tunnels of the old unfinished German underground hospital, dug during the World War II.
- Agneaux-Saint-Lô Chess Club. Recognised as one of the most dynamic chess clubs in France. The young team is part of the Top 16, first national division.
- Saint-Lô Volley was playing in the Men's volleyball Championship of France National 3 in 2012.
- Saint-Lô Floorball, the first club of floorball in Manche.
- ARC Club saint-lois: Archery club established in 1977, premier club in Manche.
- Patronage laïque saint-lois [Saint-lois secular patronage]: Table tennis club.

=== Facilities ===
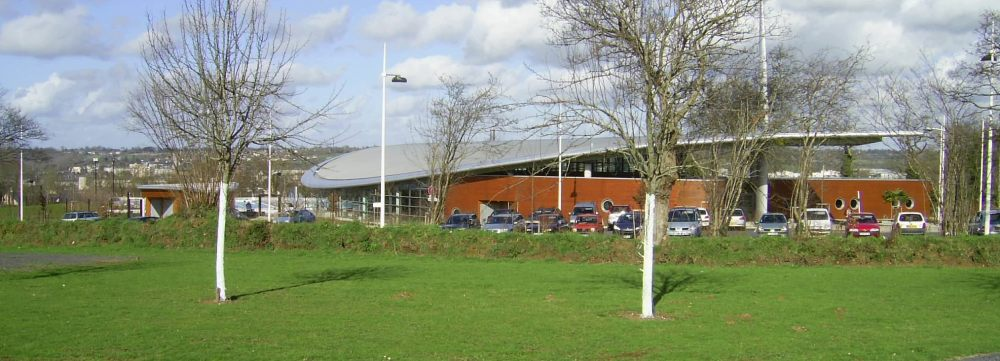
Aquatic centre

- Sports complex of Saint-Ghislain (former indoor pool on Rue de l'Exode):
  - Weight room
  - Marcel Cerdan Boxing Hall
  - Straw wall, in the gym, for archery
  - Stadium
  - Tennis courts
- André-Guilbert – Maréchal-Juin Gym
- Gym Hall of the Bois Ardent & Dojo Alain-Crépieux Dojo – Place George Pompidou
- Table tennis hall – Rue du Mesnilcroc
- Complex of the Vaucelle: Jean-Berthelem Stadium – base of canoeing
- Louis-Villemer Stadium – Ronchettes: football pitch
- Aurora Stadium – Ronchettes: rugby ground
- Fernand-Beaufils Sports Centre – Champs de Mars: basketball, fencing room
- Aquatic Centre – Bois Jugan, opened in January 2005. It has a 25 m pool with a movable floor to adjust depth, a leisure pool (wild river, seat massage, etc.), a wading pool, an outdoor pool open year-round and a gym (cold bath, Jacuzzi, hammam, fitness room and massage shower).
- The tennis courts of the Memorial Tennis Club – France-United States Memorial Hospital
- Equestrian centre of the Gourmette saint-loise
- Squash – Bois Jugan (near the aquatic centre)
- Compact golf – Bois Jugan
- Archery field – Rue Valvire (at the end)
- Baseball field.

== Sites and monuments ==
=== Religious heritage ===
==== Church of Notre-Dame ====
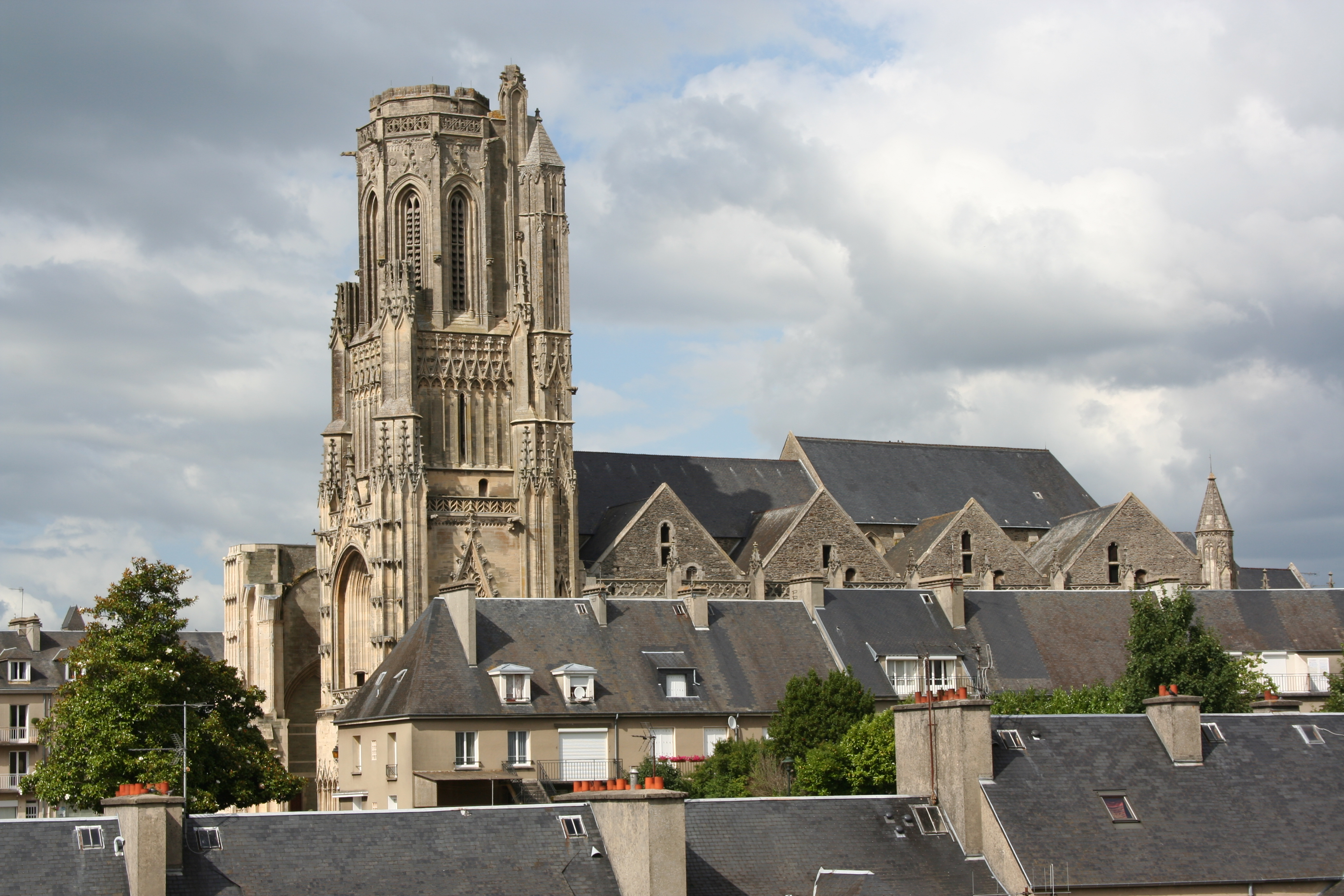
An overall view of the church.

The Church of Notre-Dame de Saint-Lô is a monument of Flamboyant Gothic style erected on four centuries from the end of the 13th century to replace the former castle's chapel. It is located in the Enclos surrounded by ramparts and was listed on the register of historic monuments in 1840. The outdoor pulpit was noted and drawn by Victor Hugo, which he called 'unique' in a letter to Adèle Foucher. He protected it from demolition, which was planned prior to town renovation in 1863.

The building suffered heavy destruction during World War II, although it was among the only standing buildings after the 1944 bombings. If the stained-glass windows were saved, after being always present since temporary removal during the war, the nave was gutted following the collapse of the North Tower which was shelled by German artillery. Its roof and façade were destroyed, as well as the top of the other tower. Instead of rebuilding the church identically, the architect of Historic Monuments decided to build a greenschist frontage to highlight the scar left by the war. The statue of Notre-Dame du Pilier is from 1467; having been destroyed and remade several times, it is now housed on a column in the apse chapel.

==== Church of Sainte-Croix ====
The abbey church of Sainte-Croix is, according to the tradition, the heir of a chapel built here by St. Helena in the 4th century and of an abbey founded by Charlemagne. Better documented is the creation of an Augustinian abbey by Algar, the new bishop of Coutances (formerly the prior of Bodmin Priory, Cornwall) in 1132. The Romanesque church was consecrated in 1202, being largely remade in the following centuries with successive renovations. The choir was remade in the 16th century while the bell tower is from 1860 to 1863. During World War II, the bell tower (located laterally) collapsed and it was on its ruins where the body of Major Howie was placed; a new bell tower was rebuilt in 1957 on the forecourt in a modern style. On the church square stands the departmental monument in memory of the victims of the wars of Algeria and Indochina, opened in 2005.

==== Cemetery of Saint-Lô ====
The cemetery of Saint-Lô is located between the Saint-Croix Church and the national stud, on the Route de Lison. The cemetery is much marked by the Second World War with the plot of the civilian victims of the bombing of 1944, also the mausoleum of the Blanchet family, and Major Glover S. Johns Junior who installed the first command post before releasing the city. One can still find the tomb of the French revolutionary general Dagobert. Also note the weeping statue which has traces of shrapnel, a bronze sculpture of Cabet, who was a student of F. Rude.

==== Other buildings ====
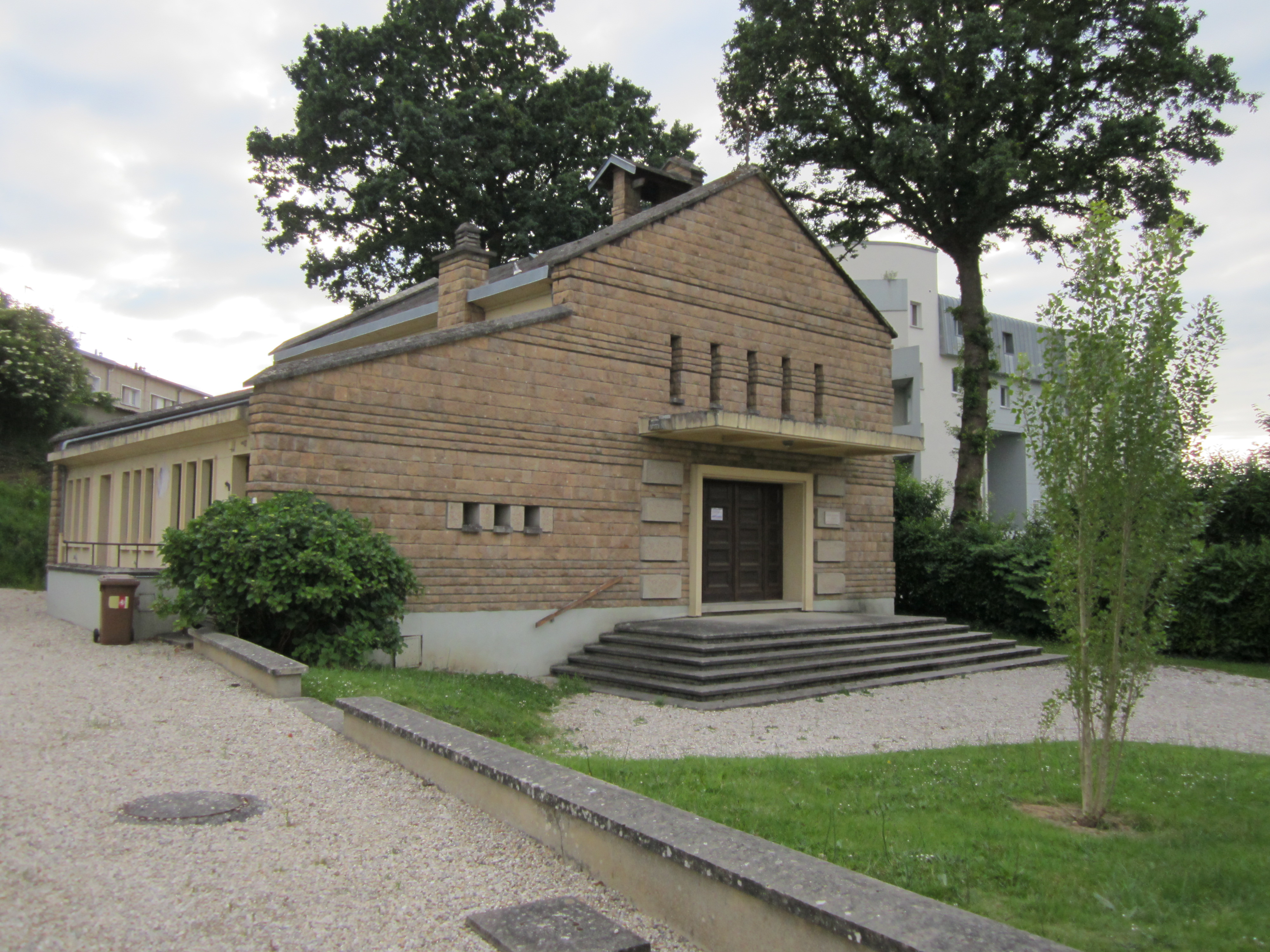
The Protestant temple

The parish of Saint-Lô has other Catholic buildings:

- Church of Saint Jean-Eudes located in Val Saint-Jean
- The chapel of the Memorial Hospital
- The chapel of the Saint Jean clinic
- The chapel of the Bon-Sauveur psychiatric hospital
- The John XXIII Chapel in the Dollée quarter

The city also has a temple of the Protestant Reformed Church of France. It was designed by architect Verrey with the glazing of Max Ingrand and was inaugurated on 23 October 1955.

=== Historical civil heritage ===
Several sites are registered as historic monuments:

- The Madeleine Chapel.
- The Château de la Vaucelle, registered on 11 July 1975.
- Notre-Dame church, recorded in 1840, contains ten objects registered in respect of objects classified as historical monuments.
- The Sainte-Croix church.
- The National Stud and its park, registered on 18 February 1993.
- The wards and the lobby of the France-United States Memorial Hospital.
- The Manor of Bosdel, constructed between the 16th and 18th centuries, registered as an historic monument on 1 April 1946.
- The remains of the walls recorded on 12 December 1945 but the Rue de la poterne and the Place des Beaux-Regards had been registered as early as 22 October 1937.

The Maison-Dieu [House of God] (not to be confused with the Hôtel-Dieu) located opposite the church and built in the second half of the 15th century was razed during the bombings of 1944. This bourgeois construction presented a half-timbered façade with corbels and sculptures. Another House, called Poids Royal, located in the quad at 11 Rue Thiers in the Enclos had been included in historical monuments on 3 October 1929, it was also destroyed.

==== Ramparts ====
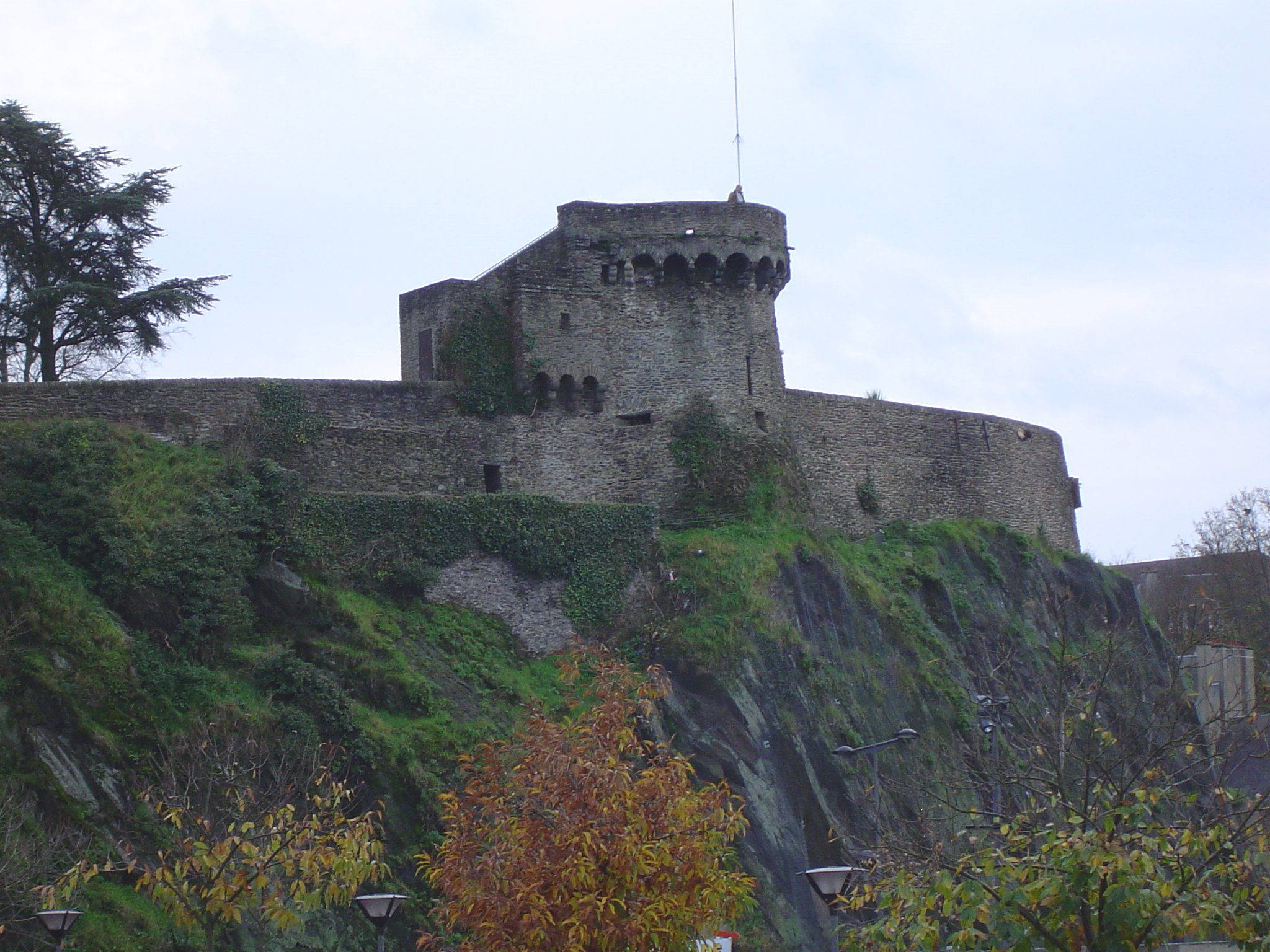
Ramparts of Saint-Lô and the Beaux-Regards Tower.

Saint-Lô also has remains of its medieval line of walls. Ramparts still exist on three of the four sides of the Enclos. The remains include: Tour des Beaux-Regards ("Tower of Beautiful Glances"), commanding the steepest part of the spur of the town, and the Tour de la Poudrière ("Tower of the Gunpowder Store"), an impressive military relic of the old citadel, are the two most notable elements of the ramparts. On the south side, the wartime disaster of 1944 had the paradoxical effect of clearing the base, where houses had grown around the Rue du Torteron.

==== National Stud ====
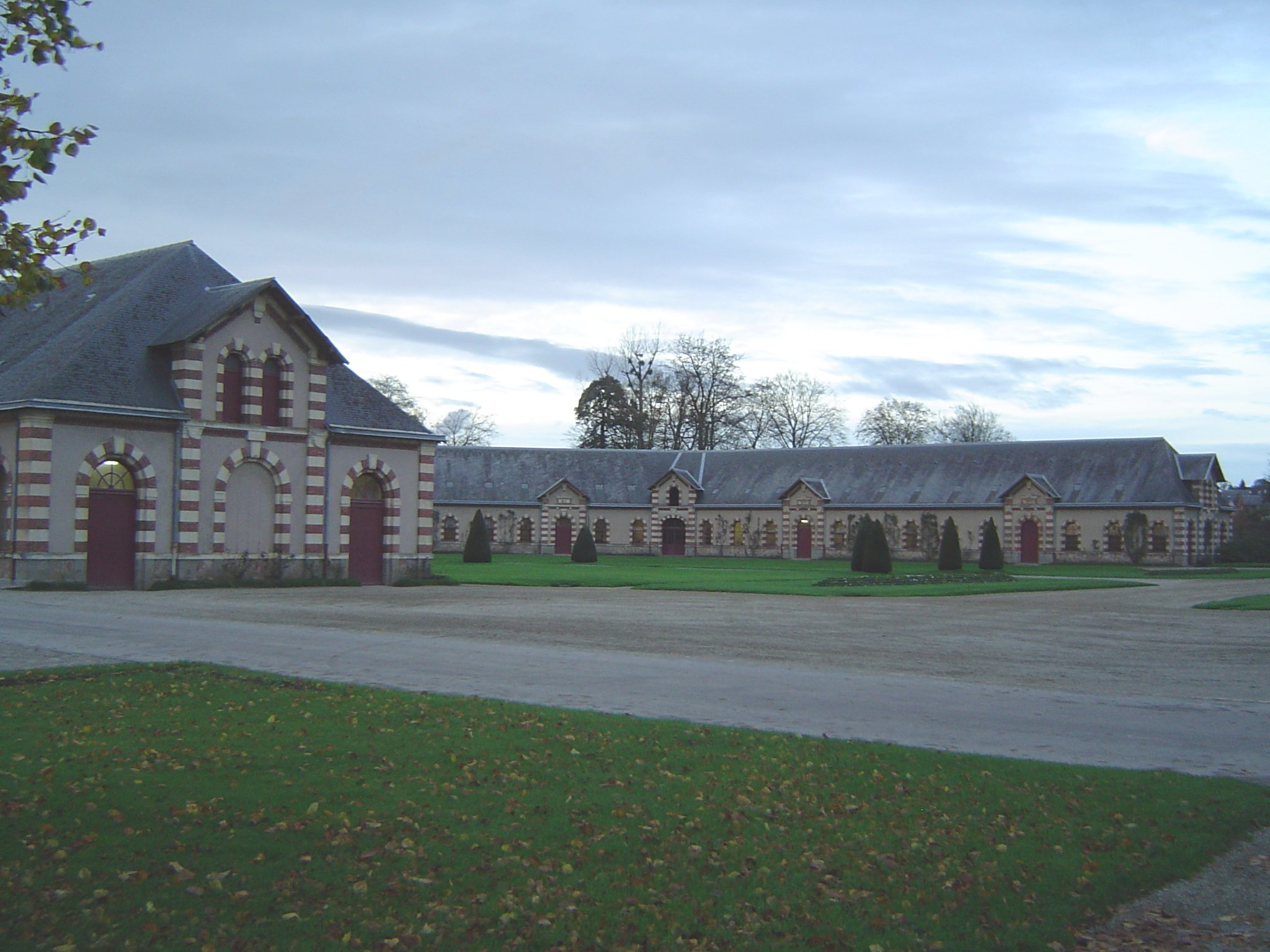
The Haras National of Saint-Lô.

Saint-Lô is home to the largest of the 23 national stud farms in France. In 1806, Napoleon provided Saint-Lô with a deposit of stallions by the Imperial Decree of 4 July 1806. From its origin, the deposit was installed on buildings and abandoned land of the old Abbey of Sainte-Croix (3 ha (7.4 acres) first leased and then owned from 22 September 1807). The stud then recruited from the breeding of the Haras du Pin.

In 1826, the military remount depot moved premises which the stud had given to it; most stallions were taken from the stud to provide cavalry. On 28 May 1874, the Boscher Law enabled supervision of the allocations of the regiments and allowed to provide the stud with over 230 horses. On 28 June 1881, the municipal council decided to transfer the stud to adjoin the Route de Bayeux. Thus, the current stud farm buildings date from 1884 (the first stone was laid on 11 June 1884), and the transfer was finished three years later. During World War I, five mares out of six were requisitioned, but no stallions. Grooms fought at the front, and German prisoners dug a pond. In 1939, the old stable housed the staff of the Haras de Strasbourg (40 stallions and staff) at the time of the German breakthrough. Then, in 1944, fifty horses were killed by the bombing and other stallions were stolen by German soldiers in flight. The old stud was destroyed and claimed by the city. Thus, there only remains the street of the same name and the Normandy building which was previously the former riding school. The new stud was then built. General de Gaulle offered to the Sultan of Morocco Bois de Rose, a thoroughbred which had been stationed at the stud for two years. The stud then grew gradually in the field of reproduction, by investing in an artificial insemination centre, a centre for the freezing of semen and an embryo transfer unit. Thus, the electoral district of Saint-Lô has the highest density of breeding deposits of France.

==== Château de la Vaucelle ====
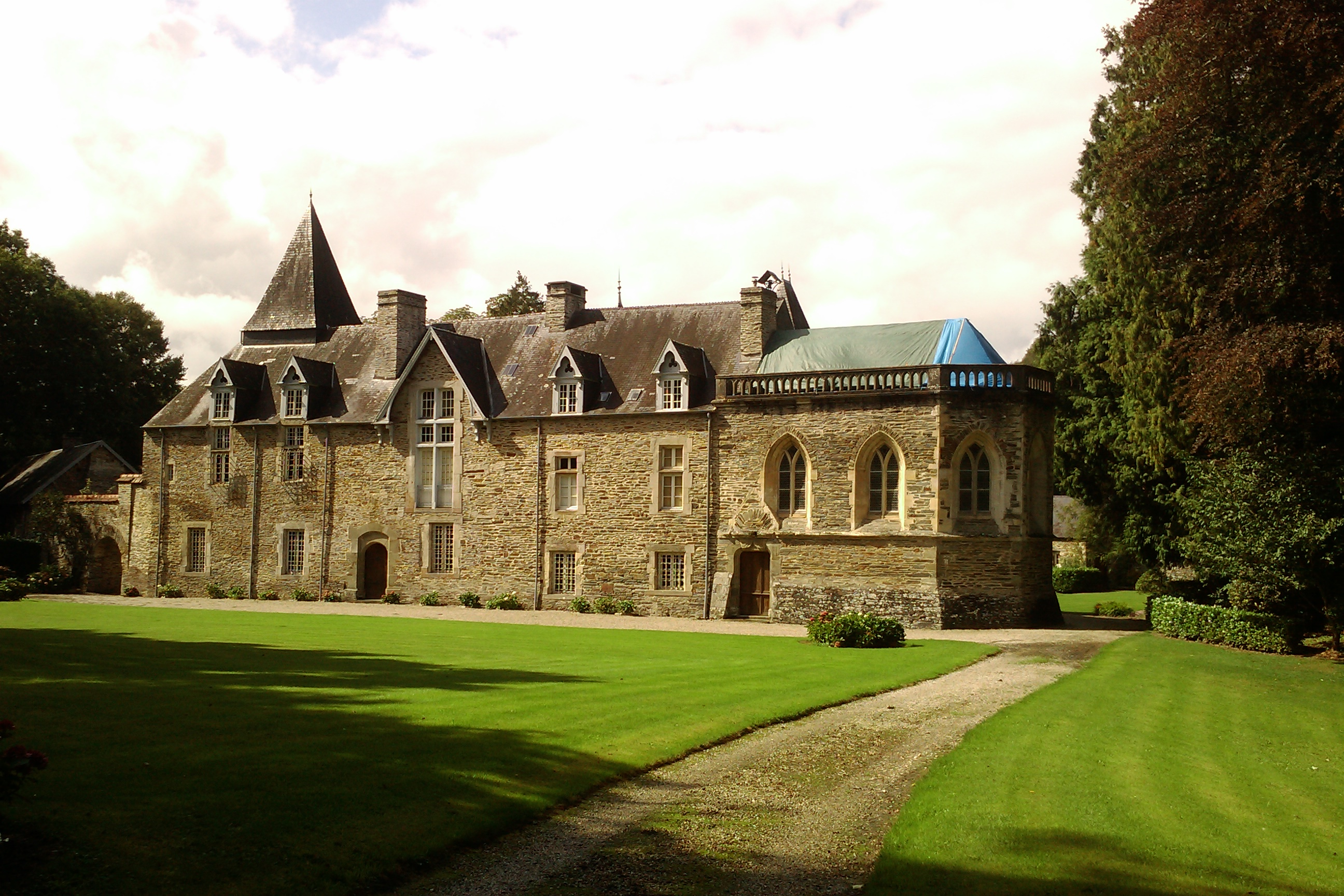
Château de la Vaucelle

Located on the bank of the Vire, the Château de la Vaucelle belongs to the Saint-Lois descendants of the 17th century diarist Luc Duchemin. The Sainte-Pernelle Chapel is the work of a Lord of the Vaucelle Jean Boucart, confessor of Louis XI and founder of the parish library of Saint-Lô, which was at the time the second library of Normandy by importance. Three kings resided at the Vaucelle: Edward III in 1346, at the beginning of the Hundred Years' War the king found that it was not a safe city, Francis I during his visit in 1532 and Charles IX. The dovecote and the northern wall niche are listed as protected elements.

=== Museums ===
==== Museum of Fine Arts ====
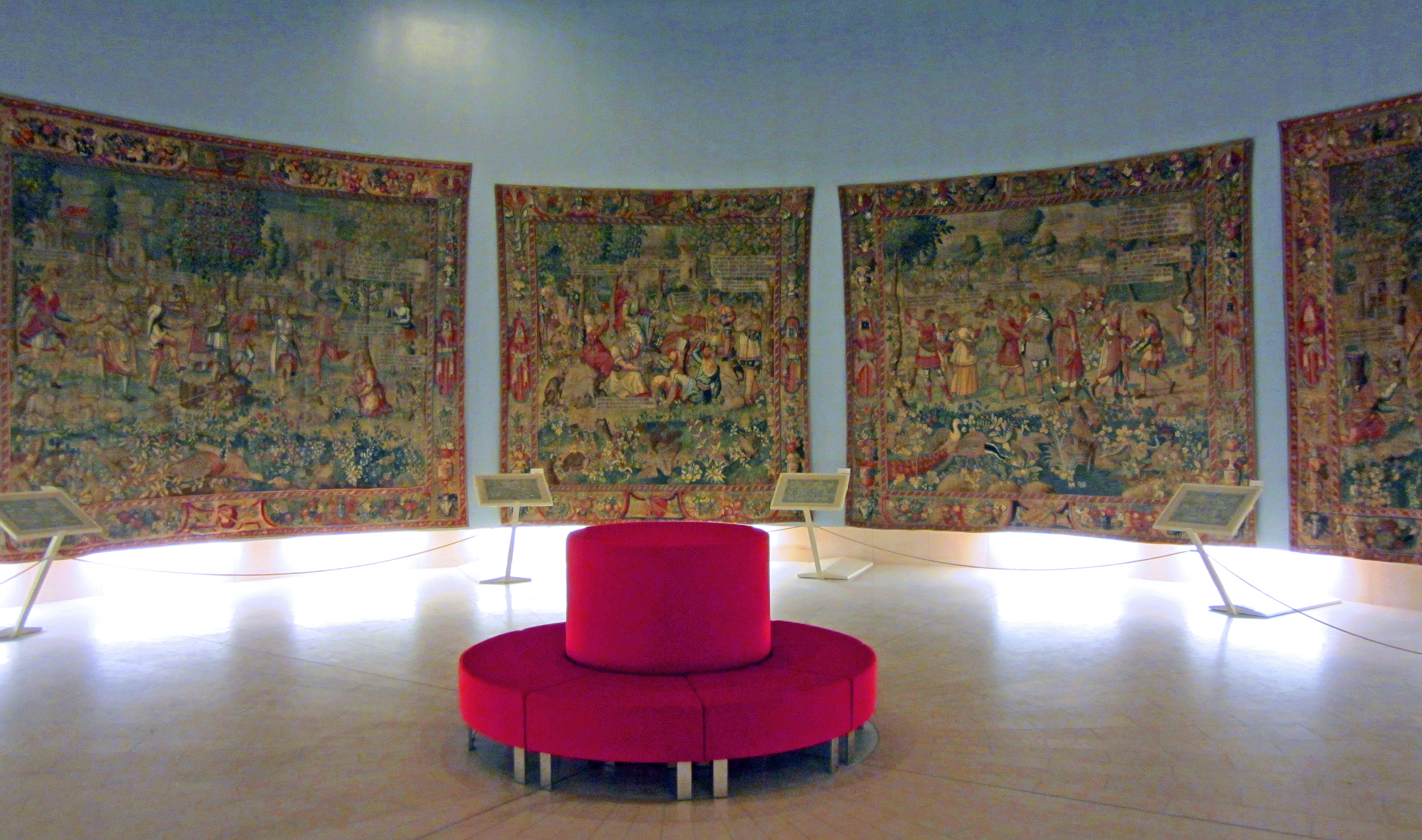
Rotunda of the tapestries of the Amours de Gombault et Macée.

Designed by the architect Eugène Leseney, the Jean-Lurçat Cultural Centre is situated on the Place du Champ-de-Mars, opposite the Sainte-Croix Church. It houses the Museum of Fine Arts where, within the collections of the city since 1989, are found: The writings and sketches of Jean Follain, paintings by Corot, Guillaume Fouace, Eugène Boudin. Is also exposed the tapestries of the Amours de Gombault et Macée (16th century), composed of eight tapestries from the Bruges workshops including a draft with the theme of the Lai d'Aristote.

==== Museum of the Norman Bocage ====
Boisjugan farm is a farmhouse from the 17th century which was in use until 1970. Converted into a museum, it traces the history and ethnography of agriculture in the Norman bocage since the 18th century with agricultural practices, horse and cattle breeding. Typical sites are reconstructed (workshop, stable, barn and creamery).

==== Chapel of Madeleine ====
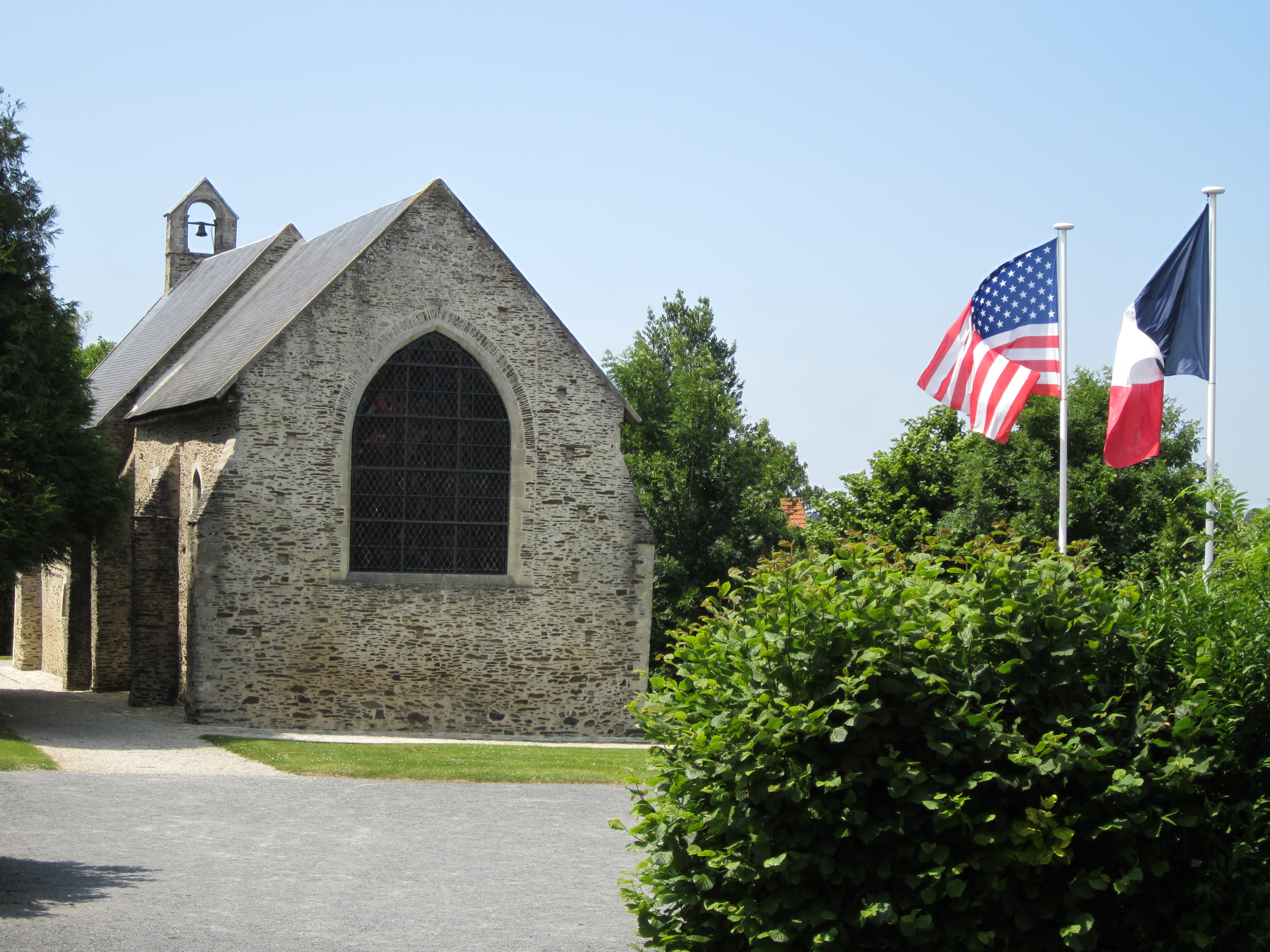
Memorial of La Madeleine and the chapel

The Chapelle de la Madeleine is located right next to the national stud, on the road to Bayeux. It is a relic of a former leprosarium from the 14th century. It was classified as an historical monument on 3 August 1974 and was restored between 1988 and 1994. A memorial was inaugurated in May 1995 in honour of the soldiers of the 29th and 35th divisions who liberated Saint-Lô in 1944. Photos, commemorative plaques, tables and flags are on display.

=== Other notable places ===
A memorial in the city honours Major Thomas Howie, Commander of the 3d Battalion, 116th Infantry Regiment of the U.S. Army's 29th Division; the unit that liberated the city on 18 July 1944. Howie was killed just before his unit entered the city and was so highly respected that his men placed his flag-draped body on the hood of a jeep at the front of the column so he could be the first American to enter the city. He became famous as the "Major of Saint-Lô".

=== Place de la Mairie ===
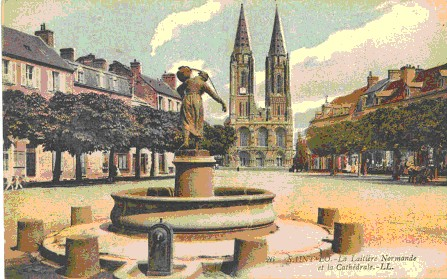
La Laitière normande [The Norman dairywoman], of Arthur Le Duc.

Redesigned in 1990, the city square is all black asphalt lit by spotlights on the ground. At night it has a resemblance to an airport runway. The statue of the dairywoman or Femme d'Isigny [Woman of Isigny] can be seen at the top of the square. Arthur Le Duc (1848–1918) introduced a plaster statue in 1887, a Norman woman marked by the hard work of the Earth, a milk rod (a typical Normandy container) on her shoulder. A few years later, the bronze arrived in Saint-Lô. It is set on a round plinth, surrounded by a basin, on the Place des Beaux-Regards in front of the Notre-Dame church. She moved a little further when the Poilu of the Great War was installed. It was then unbolted and melted on 8 February 1942, by the Germans, to recover the bronze for the arms industry. In January 1984, André Leplanquais, a merchant of Saint-Lô, wanted to create a replica of this statue. A fundraiser gained significant donations from residents. Once the money was together, the sculptor Louis Derbré, the famous sculptor of Ernée, fashioned a new statue based on the original plans. Moved several times, one can find it near stairs of the square. The base and the granite basin are the original.

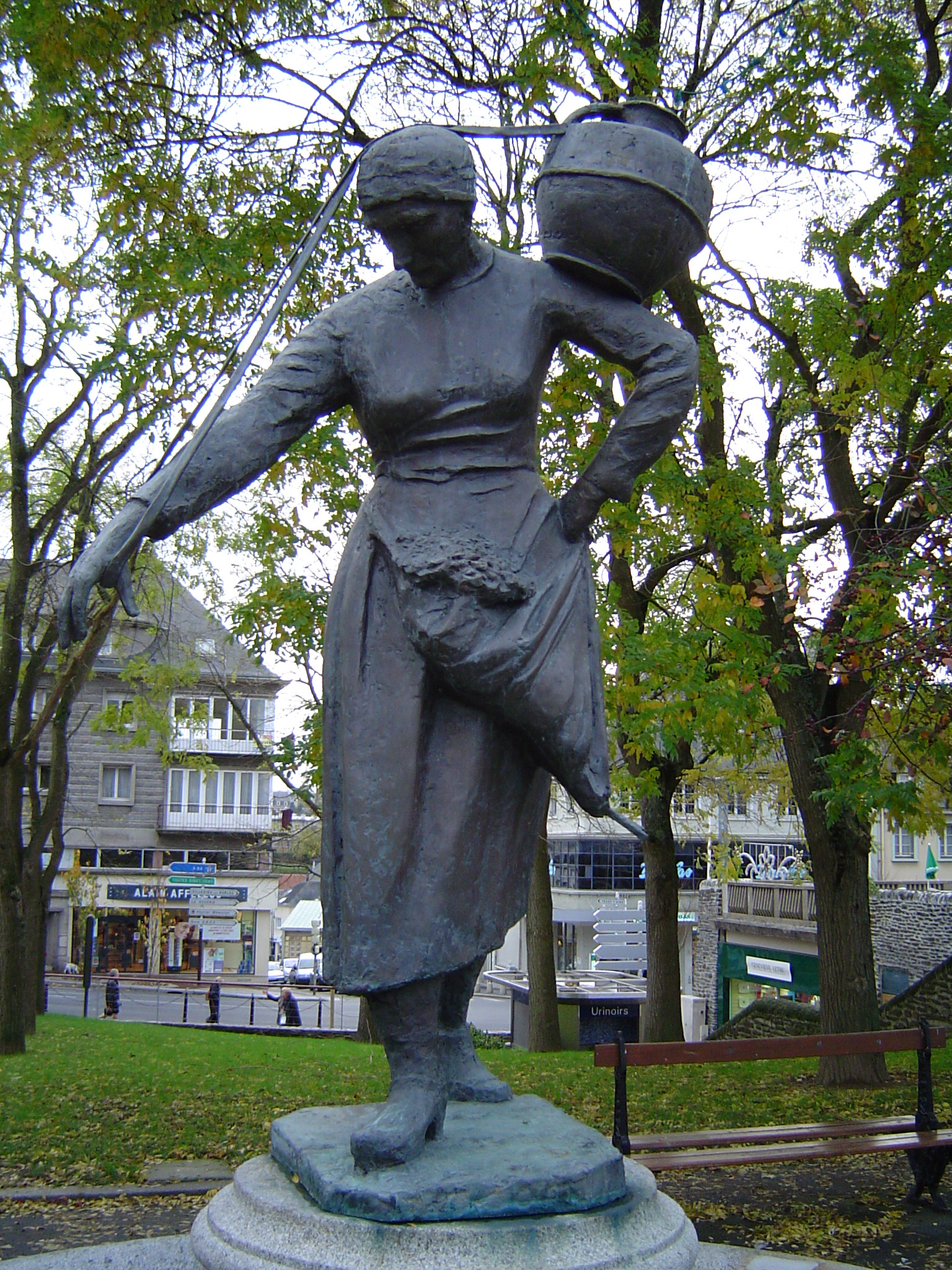
La Laitière normande of Louis Derbré, from after Arthur Le Duc.

The Havin fountain also created by Arthur Le Duc in 1887 was located near the Museum of Saint-Lô; its statue was also melted by the Germans, however no replica has been created. Nearby is the prison entrance, a remnant of the bombing in 1944. An urn containing the ashes of deportees is placed at the foot of it. A memorial in honour of the victims of Nazi repression, it became the departmental monument to the Resistance. The belfry can also be observed from the square, which seems to spring from the heart of the city. Built in 1954, it was once used to dry the hoses of firefighters. Renovated several times since 1990, it is the symbol of the reconstruction of the city. At the top are a weathervane in the shape of Unicorn and a viewpoint, from which one can admire the entire region. Previously open to the public by the tourist office, its access is now forbidden.

=== The Caisse d'Épargne squirrel ===
A granite statue representing a squirrel can be seen in Saint-Lô, which is the logo of the Caisse d'Épargne banking group; It is located in the Rue Saint-Thomas. What may seem incongruous, it is that there's no bank of this group nearby. However, the bank did have a branch in front, but it was moved in the 1990s. Then arose the question of whether or not to keep the statue for advertising purposes. The people of Saint-Lô had become attached to the squirrel, and it was finally decided to leave it in place.

== Quarters ==
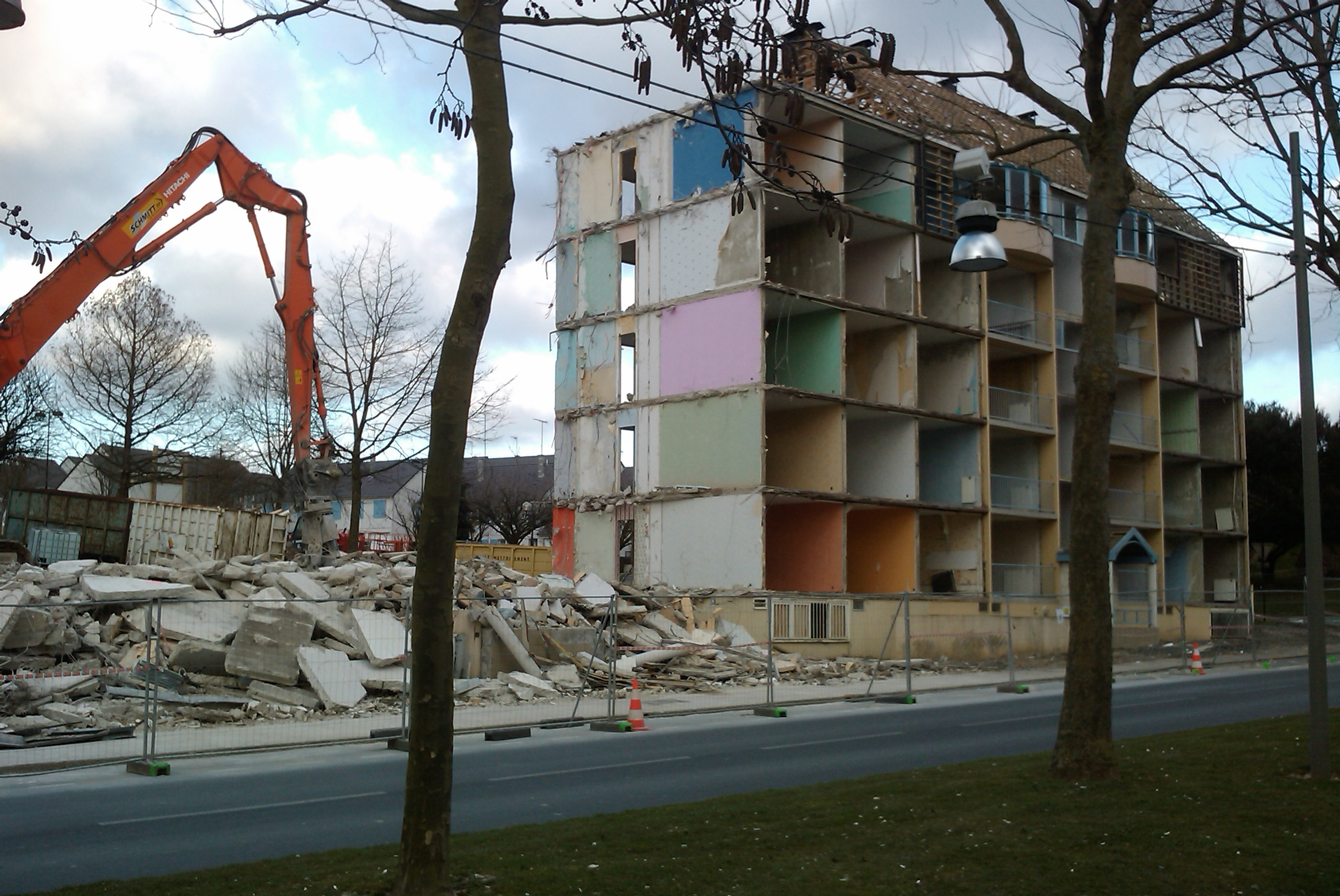
Quarter of Val Saint-Jean during restructuring (March 2010).

The town of Saint-Lô consists of a number of quarters:

- The Val Saint-Jean, composed mainly of buildings and apartment towers.
- The Aurore, composed mostly of single family homes and social housing. One can discover, the Rue des Sycamores open school of Aurore. This modern architecture is a work of Eugène Leseney.
- The Bois Ardent–Bois Jugan: Located on the south side of the city, these twp quarters include leisure spaces (urban golf, pool, and squash, etc.) as well as service spaces (employment service, retirement home) and a ZAC.
- The Dollée composed mainly of a large number of social and private apartment buildings.
- La Ferronnière
- The Enclos, historic centre of the city within the walls with its prefectural administrative centre.

== Parks and green spaces ==
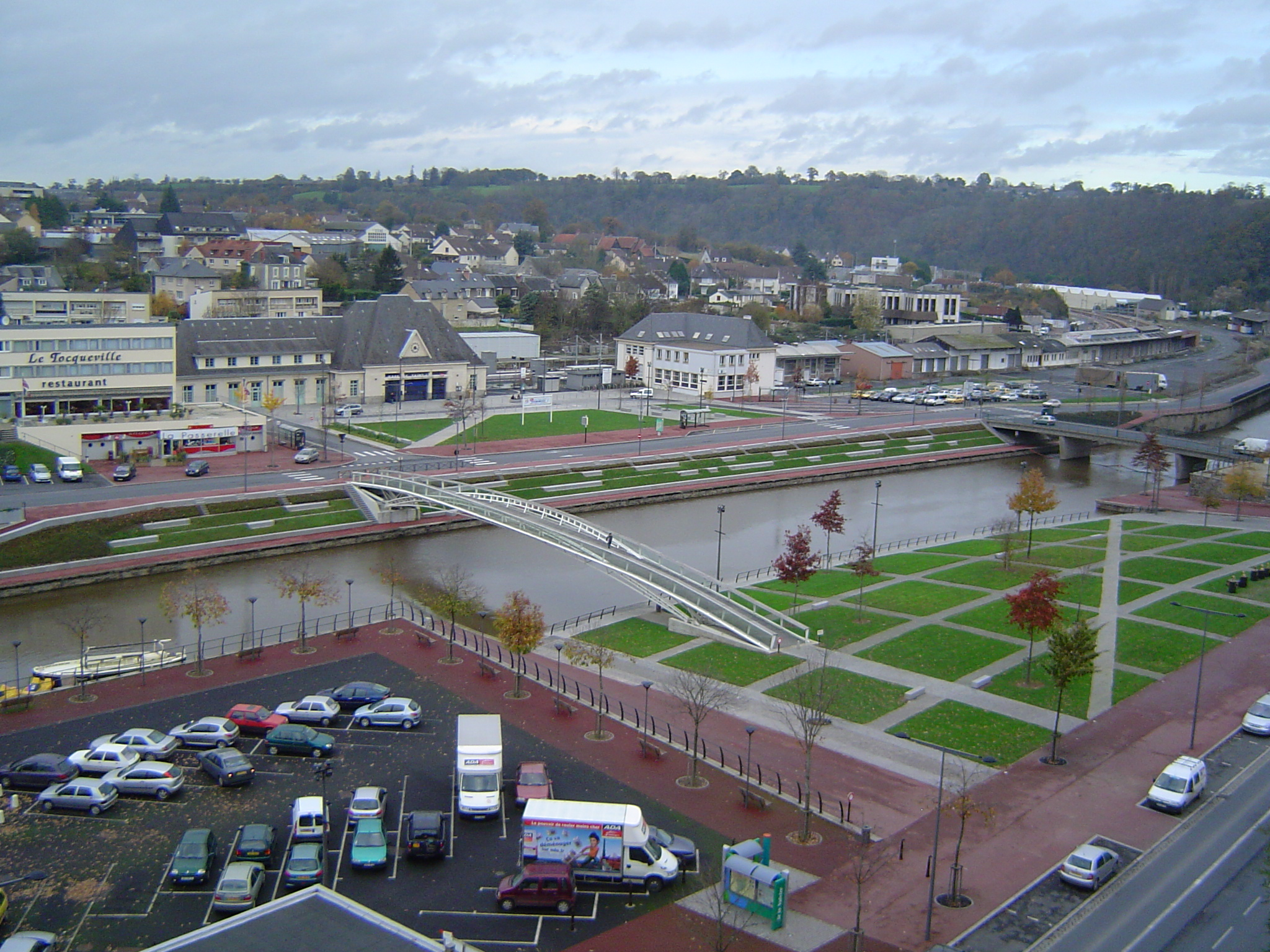
The Plage Verte

The commune is a floral city, having obtained three flowers in the Concours des villes et villages fleuris [contest of floral cities and villages].

- The public garden: It is located in the Enclos, between the Tour des Beaux-Regards and the administrative area. The view is breathtaking on the Vire and Rue Torteron.
- The Plage Verte [Green Beach]: A green space created in 2001 on part of the old tangue wharf in the vicinity of the River Vire, between the ramparts and the railway station. The modern Henri Liébard footbridge connects the two banks of the river roughly at the location of the former which had been destroyed during the bombing of June 1944. It is also the setting of the festival of the Vire which is held annually during the last weekend of June. It also allows access to the piers for boat tours.
- The islands of the river Vire: Lebroussois island and Möselman Island are separated by the weir. An arboretum has been planted at the foot of the brick chimney, only remnant of the paper mill which was burned in the 1930s.
- The towpath: Between the station and the Rocreuil bridge, many Saint-Lô people walk, do their jogging and cycling there. One can see the Château de la Vaucelle.
- The Valley of the Dollée: At the foot of the Route de Lison, there is a mill race and a watermill and a fitness trail. It is also part of the festival of "hétéroclites".
- The Boisjugan Urban Park: A green area linking the new subdivisions, which border it, and the old farmland property of the city which borders the south ring road. This landscape with an area of 12 ha (30 acres) is located behind the Museum of the Norman Bocage, of the Aquatic Centre and in the immediate vicinity of the golf course. It includes green spaces with ponds and wetlands, crossed by stone walkways overlooking the old paths, all exclusively for walkers. There is also a playground for children and a fitness trail.
- The village of Le Hutrel: In the middle of the Saint-Lô bocage, Le Hutrel has a village festival, in its square, every year on Ascension Thursday.
- The park of the Haras de Saint-Lô: Park and gardens protected as historical monuments since 18 February 1993.

The city has also two remarkable trees according to the CAUE 50 that are a saucer magnolia, located in a courtyard of the Rue du Neufbourg, and a giant sequoia, located in the courtyard of the district school, on Rue du Général Dagobert.

== Twinning programmes and sponsorship ==
The town of Saint-Lô is twinned with:

- Saint-Ghislain, Belgium, since 9 September 1962
- Aalen, Germany, since 3 June 1979
- (United Kingdom) Christchurch, since 20 April 1985
- Kervénanec, Lorient, France, since 11 September 1988
- (United States) Roanoke, USA, since 19 June 1999

Saint-Lô is the sponsor of the patrol vessel La Tapageuse, a P400-class patrol vessel of the French Navy, intended for protection tasks of exclusive economic zones or public service.

== Philately ==
A French stamp representing the coat of arms of the city was issued on 17 December 1966, the stamp was the sixth of the Arms of cities series. Its face value was 20 centimes. It was designed by Mireille Louis.

== See also ==
- Communes of the Manche department
- USS St. Lo (CVE-63), the United States Navy escort carrier named after the city following the landings at the city following Operation Overlord. She was sunk by kamikaze aircraft during the Battle of Leyte Gulf, being the first kamikaze casualty of the war.
- Fernand-Marie-Eugène Le Gout-Gérard

== Bibliography ==
: Document used as a source for the drafting of this article.

- Adresse de plusieurs membres du Clergé de Saint-Lô, à l'Assemblée Nationale. Lue dans la Séance du 13 juillet au soir [Address of several members of the clergy of Saint-Lô, in the National Assembly. Read in the meeting of July 13 in the evening] (in French). Paris: Baudouin. 1790.
- Ballade en clichés : Saint-Lô court sur un siècle [Ballad in clichés: Saint-Lô runs over a century] (in French). Guilberville: Le cyprès penché. 2001.
- Barbaroux, Jean (1972). Images de Saint-Lô [Images of Saint-Lô] (in French). Saint-Lô: P. Gobet.
- Barbaroux, Jean; Baude, Henri (1962). Les Tapisseries des amours de Gombault et de Macée, du Musée de Saint-Lô [The tapestries of love of Gombault and Macée, of the Museum of Saint-Lô] (in French). Saint-Lô: Édition privée.
- Leduc, Andrée; Bekaert, Martine (1996). Relevé des mariages de la paroisse de Saint-Lô de Rouen : table filiative [Succession of marriages from the parish of Saint-Lô in Rouen: filiative table] (in French). Rouen: Cercle généalogique Rouen Seine-Maritime.
- Bernard, Abbé (1953). Histoire de la ville de Saint-Lô et de ses environs [History of the city of Saint-Lô and its surroundings] (in French). Saint-Lô: R. Jacqueline.
- Toustain de Billy, René (1812). Mémoires sur l'histoire du Cotentin et de ses villes: villes de Saint-Lô et de Carentan [Memoirs on the history of the Cotentin peninsula and its cities: cities of Saint-Lô and Carentan] (in French). Saint-Lô: F. Le Tual.
- Boscher, Jean-Yves (1970). La Tenture des amours de Gombaut et Macée au musée de Saint-Lô [The drapes of the loves of Gombaut and Macee at the Museum of Saint-Lô] (in French). Saint-Lô: Jacqueline.
- Bouin, Jean (1763). Observation de l'éclipse de lune du 3 février 1757 faite à Rouen au prieuré de Saint-Lô [Observation of the lunar eclipse of 3 February 1757 made in Rouen to the Priory of Saint-Lô] (in French). Paris: Imprimerie Royale.
- Cailleux, Phillippe (1998). Trois paroisses de Rouen, XIIIe XVe siècle (Saint-Lô, Notre-Dame-la-Ronde et Saint-Herbland) étude de topographie et d'urbanisme [Three parishes of Rouen, 13th–15th century (Saint-Lô, Notre-Dame-la-Ronde and Saint-Herbland) topography and urban planning study] (in French). Lille: A.N.R.T, Université de Lille III, Université de Paris IV, Paris-Sorbonne. Thèse de doctorat.
- Catalogue du manuscrit des heures de Saint-Lô de Rouen et de livres et manuscrits rares, le manuscrit des heures de Saint-Lô provenant de feu M. Lebrument [Catalogue of the manuscript of the hours of Saint-Lô, of Rouen and books and rare manuscripts, the manuscript of hours of Saint-Lô from the feu M. Lebrument] (in French). Paris: Lib. Bachelin-Deflorenne. 1869.
- Catalogue général des manuscrits des bibliothèques publiques de France. Tome X, Départements. Avranches, Coutances, Valognes, Cherbourg, Bayeux, Condé-sur-Noireau, Falaise, Flers, Domfront, Argentan, Lisieux, Honfleur, Saint-Lô, Mortain, Chapitre de Bayeux, Pont-Audemer, Vire [General catalogue of the manuscripts of the public libraries of France. Volume X, departments. Avranches, Coutances, Valognes, Cherbourg, Bayeux, Condé-sur-Noireau, Falaise, Flers, Domfront, Argentan, Lisieux, Honfleur, Saint-Lô, Mortain, Chapitre de Bayeux, Pont-Audemer, Vire] (in French). Paris: Plon. 1889.
- Chambre économique de Saint-Lô (1988). Saint-Lô, Les secrets de la Licorne [Saint-Lô, the secrets of the Unicorn] (in French). ISBN 2-9502616-1-2.
- Claudin, A. (1894). Les Origines de l'imprimerie à Saint-Lô en Normandie [The origins of printing at Saint-Lô in Normandy] (in French). Paris: A. Claudin.
- Le Clerc, R. (1930). Histoire du Bon Sauveur de Saint-Lô [History of the Bon Sauveur of Saint-Lô] (in French). Coutances: Imprimerie Notre-Dame.
- Plum, Gilles; Corbierre, Pascal (1994). Saint-Lô : la reconstruction, Manche [Saint-Lô: Reconstruction, Manche] (in French). Saint-Lô: Inventaire général des monuments et richesses artistiques de la France.
- Cliquet, Dominique; Fichet de Clairfontaine F., François; Marcigny, Cyril. 2000 – 5000 ans d'histoire aux portes de Saint-Lô, Archéologie préventive et aménagement du territoire, catalogue de l'exposition de Saint-Lô (Manche) [2000 – 5000 years of history at the gates of Saint-Lô, preventive archaeology and spatial planning, catalogue of the exhibition of Saint-Lô (Manche)] (in French). Saint-Lô. 64 p.
- Corbin, Stéphane (2003). La vie associative à Saint-Lô : l'autre reconstruction [The Associational life in Saint-Lô: another reconstruction] (in French). Paris: L'Harmattan.
- Dilasser, François; Le Dantec, Jean-Pierre (1996). Arthotèque de Caen, Musée de Saint-Lô, Musée de Valenciennes, Musée de l'Abbaye Sainte-Croix des Sables d'Olonne [Arthotèque Caen, Museum of Saint-Lô, Museum of Valenciennes, Museum of the Abbey of Sainte-Croix des Sables d'Olonne] (in French). Cognac: Le temps qu'il fait.
- Davodet, Auguste (1933). Quelques notes sur le " Corot " du Musée de Saint-Lô [Some notes on the "Corot" of the Museum of Saint-Lô] (in French). Saint-Lô: Jacqueline.
- Bachelin-Deflorenne, Antoine (1869). Description du Livre d'heures du prieuré de Saint-Lô [Description of the book of hours of the priory of Saint-Lô] (in French). Paris: Bachelin-Deflorenne.
- Delamare, Jean (1851). Jugement du Tribunal de Coutances : Ministère public contre Jean Delamare, imprimeur à Saint-Lô [Judgement of the Court of Coutances: Ministère public v Jean Delamare, printer in Saint-Lô] (in French). Saint-Lô: C.J. Delamare.
- Delauney (1863). Notice sur l'église Notre-Dame de Saint-Lô [Record on the church Notre-Dame de Saint-Lô] (in French). Saint-Lô: Élie.
- Delisle, Léopold (1904). L'Imprimerie à Saint-Lô au XVIIe siècle, appendice, description en vers des tableaux de la grande galerie du château de Thorigny [Printing at Saint-Lô in the 17th century, Appendix, description of the tables of the great gallery of the Château de Thorigny] (in French). Saint-Lô: F. Le Cual.
- Deries, Madeleine (1922). Le District de Saint-Lô pendant la Révolution, 1787 – an IV [The District of Saint-Lô during the Revolution, 1787 – year IV] (in French). Paris: A. Picard.
- Du Ciseau du sculpteur au sourire des saints : Sculpture gothique de la Manche, XIIIe XIVe siècle. Catalogue de l'exposition du musée des beaux-arts de Saint-Lô, 19 novembre 2005–29 janvier 2006 [The chisel of the sculptor in the smile of the saints: Gothic Sculpture of Manche, 13th–14th century. Catalogue of the exhibition of the Museum of fine arts, Saint-Lô, 19 November 2005 – 29 January 2006] (in French). 2005.
- Dubosq, René. Cartulaire de l'abbaye de Saint-Lô [Cartulary of the abbey of Saint-Lô] (in French). S.l: s.n. 1800-1899.
- Duruisseau, François. Saint-Lô, une histoire maritime et fluviale [Saint-Lô, a maritime and river history] (in French). ISBN 978-2-9508231-3-7.
- Exposition de l'industrie à Saint-Lô du 15 au 29 mai 1859 [Exhibition of industry in Saint-Lô from 15 to 29 May 1859] (in French). Saint-Lô: Élie. 1859.
- Exposition des beaux-arts à Saint-Lô, du 15 au 29 mai 1859 [Exhibition of fine arts at Saint-Lô, from 15 to 29 May 1859] (in French). Saint-Lô: Élie Fils. 1859.
- Fouace, Jean (1994). Musée des beaux-arts de Saint-Lô, du 10 novembre 1994 au 3 janvier 1995 [Museum of fine arts, Saint-Lô, 10 November 1994, to 3 January 1995] (in French). S.l: s.n.
- Gancel, Pierre (1976). Saint-Lô en cartes postales anciennes [Saint-Lô in old postcards] (in French). Paris: S.F.L.
- de Gerville, Charles (1989). Les Châteaux de la Manche : L'arrondissement de Saint-Lô [The Châteaus of Manche: The arrondissement of Saint-Lô] (in French). Paris: Res Universis.
- de Gerville, Charles. Voyage archéologique dans la Manche. 1818–1820 / II [An archaeological journey in Manche] (in French). Vol. II. 1818-1820.
- de Glanville, Léonce. Histoire du Prieuré de Saint-Lô de Rouen ses prieurs, ses privilèges, ses revenus, d'après les documents authentiques tirés des archives de la Seine-Inférieure et mis en ordre [History of the Priory of Saint-Lô de Rouen its priors, its privileges, its revenues, based on authentic documents from the archives of Seine-Inférieure and put in order] (in French). Rouen: E. Cagniard. 1890-1891.
- Grente, Georges (1915). Saint-Lô, évêque de Coutances [Saint-Lô, Bishop of Coutances] (in French). Saint-Lô: Jacqueline.
- Grosset, Charles (1974). Catalogue provisoire du Musée de Saint-Lô [Provisional catalogue of the Museum of Saint-Lô] (in French). Saint-Lô: Société d'archéologie et d'histoire de la Manche.
- Guéné, Elie (1970). La Manche – Bocage saint-lois et pays de Coutances [Manche – Bocage saint-lois and country of Coutances] (in French).
- Hébert, Edmond. Phyllades de Saint-Lô et conglomérats pourprés dans le nord-ouest de la France : Cambrien, Précambrien, Archéen [Saint-Lô phyllite and purple conglomerates in the northwest of France: Precambrian, Cambrian, Archean] (in French). Lagny: F. Aureau. 1887, 1886.
- Histoire de la ville de Saint-Lô. Publication [History of the city of Saint-Lô. Publication] (in French). Caen: F. Poisson. 1825.
- Histoire du prieuré de Saint-Lô de Rouen, ses prieurs, ses privilèges, ses revenus d'après les documents authentiques tirés des archives de la Seine-Inférieure et mis en ordre [History of the Priory of Saint-Lô in Rouen, its priors, its privileges, its revenues based on authentic documents from the archives of Seine-Inférieure and put in order] (in French). Rouen: E. Cagniard. 1890-1891.
- Houben, Daniel (1994). Saint-Lô [Saint-Lô] (in French). Rennes: A. Sutton.
- Houël, Gabriel. Histoire de la ville de Saint-Lô [History of the City of Saint-Lô] (in French). Paris: Res Universis. 1825, 1992.
- Rathouis, Édouard; Hucher, Eugène (1873). Le Vitrail royal de l'église Notre-Dame de Saint-Lô (Manche) restauré à la manufacture de vitraux peints du Carmel du Mans [The royal window of the church Notre-Dame de Saint-Lô (Manche) restored to the manufacture of painted stained glass windows of the Carmel of le Mans] (in French). Paris.
- Jouet, Roger (1984). Découvrir Saint-Lô [Discover Saint-Lô] (in French). Condé-sur-Noireau: S.n. ISBN 978-2-85480-075-3.
- Dufresne, Jean-Luc; Jugan, Régine (1991). Le Monde de Follain : artistes et vestiges : de juin à octobre 1991 à Saint-Lô en Cotentin [The world of Follain: artists and remains: from June to October 1991 at Saint-Lô in Cotentin] (in French). Saint-Lô: musée des beaux-arts.
- Perrette-Lamarche, Jérôme Frédéric (1851). Extrait d'un dictionnaire du vieux langage, ou patois des habitants des campagnes des arrondissements de Cherbourg, Valognes et Saint-Lô [Extract from a dictionary of old language, or patois of the inhabitants of campaigns of the boroughs of Cherbourg and Valognes-Saint-Lô] (in French). Saint-Lô: Elie fils.
- Lantier, Maurice (1994). 44 jours en 1944 pour libérer Saint-Lô : (6 juin-19 juillet 1944) [44 days in 1944 to liberate Saint-Lô: (6 June 6–19 July 1944)] (in French). Saint-Lô: Saint-Lô 44. ISBN 978-2-9508090-3-2.
- Lantier, Maurice (1974). Crise des subsistances à Saint-Lô au printemps 1789 [Crisis of subsistances in Saint-Lô in the spring of 1789] (in French). Caen: CRDP.
- Legigan, Roger; Lantier, Maurice (2000). Renaissance et reconstruction de Saint-Lô, Manche. 1944–1964. Étude collective menée par une équipe de l'Université Inter-Ages, antenne du bocage saint-lois, président R. Legigan [Renaissance and reconstruction of Saint-Lô, Manche. 1944–1964. collective study by a team of the Inter-Ages University, branch of the bocage saint-lois, president R. Legigan] (in French). Vol. I. Saint-Lô: Université inter-âges, antenne du bocage saint-lois. ISBN 978-2-9516067-0-8.
- Lantier, Maurice (2001). Renaissance et reconstruction de Saint-Lô, Manche. 1944-1964. Étude collective menée par une équipe de l'université inter-âges, antenne du bocage saint-lois, président Robert Legigan [Renaissance and reconstruction of Saint-Lô, Manche. 1944–1964. collective study by a team of the Inter-Ages University, branch of the bocage saint-lois, president Robert Legigan] (in French). Vol. II. Saint-Lô: Université inter-âges, antenne du bocage saint-lois.
- Lantier, Maurice (1969). Saint-Lô au bûcher : le martyre d'une cité de Basse-Normandie pendant la seconde guerre mondiale (juin-juillet 1944) [Saint-Lô at the stake: The martyrdom of a city of Lower Normandy during the Second World War (June–July 1944)] (in French). Saint-Lô: Jacqueline.
- Jubé de Laperelle, Auguste (1801). Rapport fait au nom d'une commission spéciale... sur les réclamations de plusieurs citoyens de l'arrondissement de Saint-Lô [Report made on behalf of a Special Committee... on the claims of several citizens of the District of Saint-Lô] (in French). Paris: Imprimerie nationale.
- La Vie à Saint-Lô : du XVIe siècle à 1939 [Life in Saint-Lô: 16th century to 1939] (in French). Saint-Lô. 1974.
- Lechevallier, Hippolyte (1920). La propriété foncière du clergé et la vente des biens ecclésiastiques dans le district de Saint-Lô [Land ownership of the clergy and the sale of church property in the district of Saint-Lô] (in French). Saint-Lô: R. Jacquelin.
- Lecourt, Jean-Luc (1983). Étude du haras de Saint-Lô depuis 1945 : évolution du cheptel équin [Study of haras de Saint-Lô since 1945: evolution of equine cattle] (in French). Maisons-Alfort. Thèse doctorat vét.
- Lefrançois, Auguste (1967). Quand Saint-Lô voulait revivre, juillet à Noël 1944 [When Saint-Lô wanted to revive, July to Christmas 1944] (in French). Coutances: P. Bellée. Illustrations de Louis Wit.
- Leclerc, Jacques; Lelégard, Marcel (2003). Saint-Lô sous les bombes : dans les ruines de l'Enclos [Saint-Lô under the bombs: In the ruins of the enclosure] (in French). Condé-sur-Noireau: C. Corlet. ISBN 978-2-84706-134-5.
- Dulague, Vincent; Messier, Charles (1776). Observations de la comète découverte par M. Messier le 1. avril 1771 faites à l'observatoire de Saint-Lô, à Rouen [Observations of the comet discovered by Dr. Messier 1 April 1771 made at the Observatory of Saint-Lô, in Rouen] (in French). Paris: Imprimerie Royale.
- Mourier, Guillaume (2004). Les Sinistrés saint-lois au 6 juin 1944, essai typologique sur les sinistrés de l'Enclos [Saint-lois disaster on 6 June 1944, typological test on claims of the enclosure] (in French). Saint-Lô. ISBN 2-914329-11-3. 150 p.
- Nomenclatures des rues de Saint-Lô, 1839-1944: matériaux pour une histoire topographique de la ville [Classifications of the streets of Saint-Lô, 1839-1944: Materials for a topographical history of the city] (in French). Saint-Lô: Société d'archéologie et d'histoire de la Manche. 1969.
- Penez, Maurice (1974). 1914–1974, 60 ans à Saint-Lô [1914–1974, 60 years in Saint-Lô] (in French). Saint-Lô: M. Penez.
- de Saint-Lô, Sainte-Croix (1870). Cartulaire de Saint-Lô [Cartulary of Saint-Lô] (in French). Saint-Lô: Jacqueline fils.
- Seguin, Jean (1930). Cent Réimpressions de vieilles gravures sur bois ou sur métal provenant d'imprimeries d'Avranches, de Coutances, de Saint-Lô et de deux grandes planches de cartes à jouer [One hundred reprints of old engravings on wood or metal from the printers of Avranches, Coutances, Saint-Lô and two boards of cards to play] (in French). Paris: Groves & Michaux.
- Toussaint, Joseph. La percée américaine à l'ouest de Saint-Lô, La Chapelle-Enjuger dans la bataille [The American breakthrough to the west of Saint-Lô, La Chapelle-Enjuger in the battle] (in French). Marigny: Inédits & introuvables. 1950, 2000.
- Travers, Émile (1895). Les premiers imprimeurs de Saint-Lô [The first printers of Saint-Lô] (in French). Saint-Lô: F. Le Tual.
- Trochon, Charles. Histoire du Collège de Saint-Lô [History of the College of Saint-Lô] (in French). Saint-Lô: Élie Fils. 1871, 1983.
- Potier de La Varde, R. Sur deux Mousses rares observées aux environs de Saint-Lô [On two rare mosses observed around Saint-Lô] (in French). S.l.: s.n. s.d.
- La bataille de Saint-Lô [The battle of Saint-Lô] (in French). Saint-Lô: R. Jacqueline. 1951.
- Wit, Robert (1999). Les gueules de Saint-Lô et les autres : rétro souvenir de 520 portraits-charge de 1946 à 2000 [The hangovers of Saint-Lô and others: Retro souvenir of 520 ornate portraits 1946–2000] (in French). Saint-Lô: S.n.
- Jouet, Roger (2012). Saint-Lô [Saint-Lô] (in French). éditions OREP.

Digital media

- Saint-Lô retrouvé (Media notes). DVD of the association of the same name, which reconstitutes the urban landscape before the bombing of 6 June 1944.
