= Battle of Saint-Lô =

Military engagement in France during WWII

- Part of the Normandy Campaign, World War II
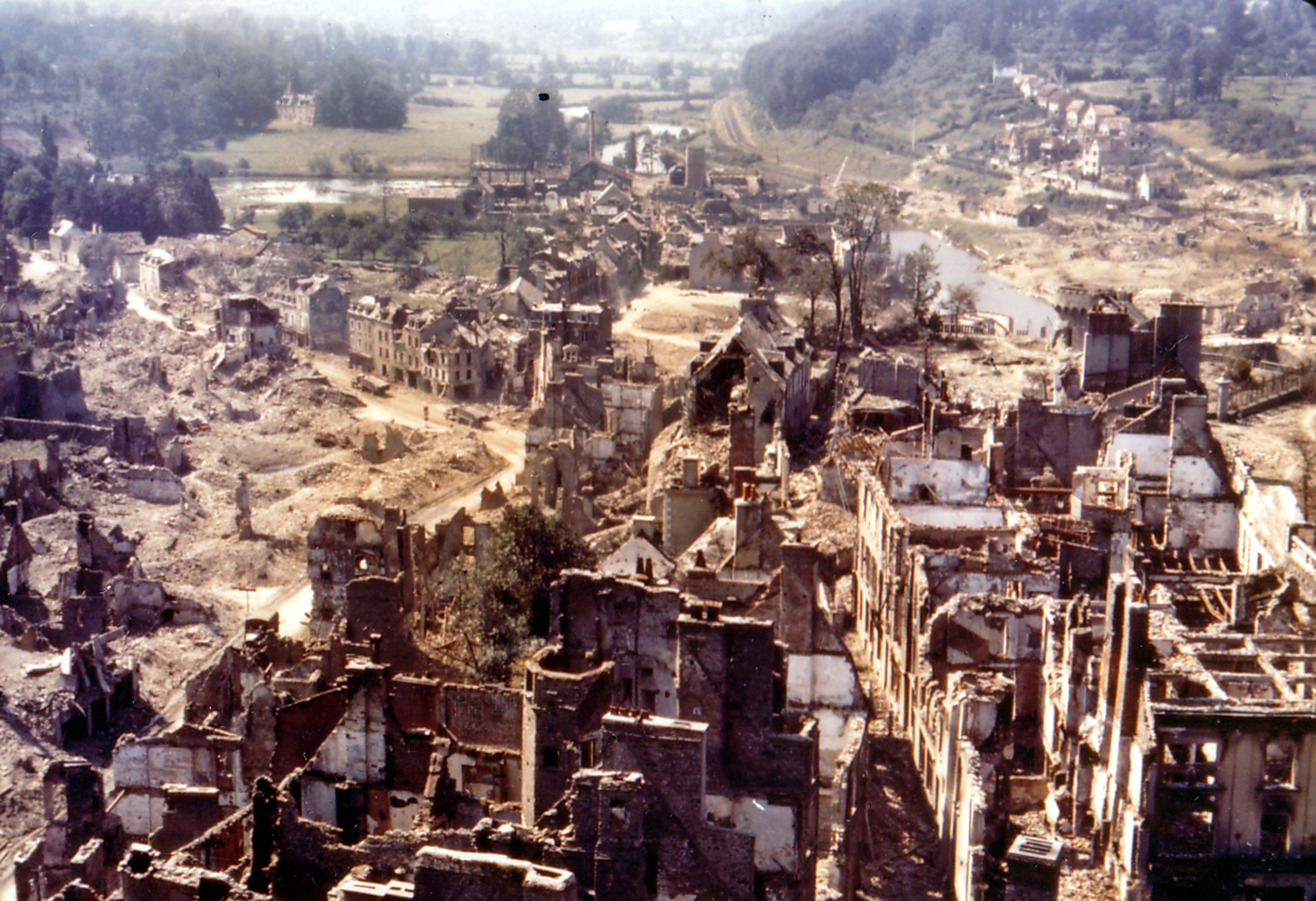
- Saint-Lô, 95% destroyed after the 1944 bombardments, known as The Capital of Ruins.
Date	July 7–19, 1944
Location	Saint-Lô, France 49.12°N 1.09°W
Result	Allied victory

Belligerents
United States	Germany

Commanders and leaders
(United States) Charles H. Corlett (United States) Charles H. Gerhardt (United States) Leland Hobbs (United States) Paul W. Baade	(Nazi Germany) Paul Hausser (Nazi Germany) Dietrich Kraiß † (Nazi Germany) Eugen Meindl (Nazi Germany) Otto Baum

Casualties and losses
For the period July 7–22; 29th Infantry Division: 3,706; 30th Infantry Division: 3,934; 35th Infantry Division: 2,437; Total XIX Corps: 11,000+ casualties, of which 3,000+ killed	Unknown
- 352 French civilians

The Battle of Saint-Lô was one of the three conflicts in the battle of the hedgerows which took place between July 7 and 19, 1944, in Saint-Lô, Manche, Normandy, France, just before Operation Cobra. Saint-Lô had fallen to Germany in 1940, and, after the Invasion of Normandy, the Americans targeted the city, as it served as a strategic crossroads. American bombardment caused heavy damage (up to 95% of the city was destroyed) and a high number of casualties, which resulted in the martyr city being called "The Capital of Ruins", popularized in a report by Samuel Beckett.

== Background ==
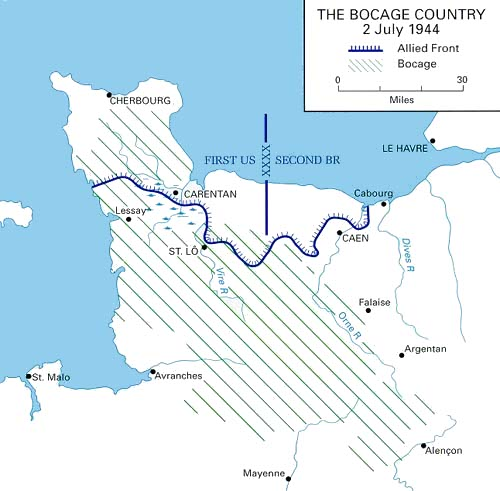
Front lines shortly before the battle

France was invaded in 1940 and the 7th Panzer Division, commanded by Erwin Rommel, entered Normandy, with the objective of capturing Cherbourg Harbor. Saint-Lô fell under German control on the night of June 17, 1940. During the occupation, the statue of la Laitière normande (the Norman milkmaid), created by Arthur Le Duc was dismantled and melted down to make cannons, despite opposition from local politicians.

In 1943, the Germans began digging an underground hospital, which remains today, using the slave labor of the STO.

A German soldier was shot in January 1944, and many Saint-Lô residents were detained. The movie theater, theater, and bars were closed, radios were confiscated, and the curfew was moved to 8 p.m.

Following the Invasion of Normandy, American forces began their advance toward Saint-Lô. Although progress was steady, it came at a high cost—an estimated 40,000 casualties for a gain of just 20 miles. Saint-Lô was the primary initial objective for the US forces, while the British aimed for the city of Caen.

== American bombardment ==
Due to its strategic importance as a crossroads, a bombardment by the Americans, focusing on the railway station and the power plant, began on the night of July 6, and lasted into the morning of July 7. The objective was to cut off German reinforcements in Brittany from the front.

Warning leaflets were dropped the day before, but high winds dispersed them to neighboring communities, failing to alert local residents. Over two hundred prisoners were killed at the local prison, including seventy-six imprisoned French patriots (all that remains of the prison today is the gate).

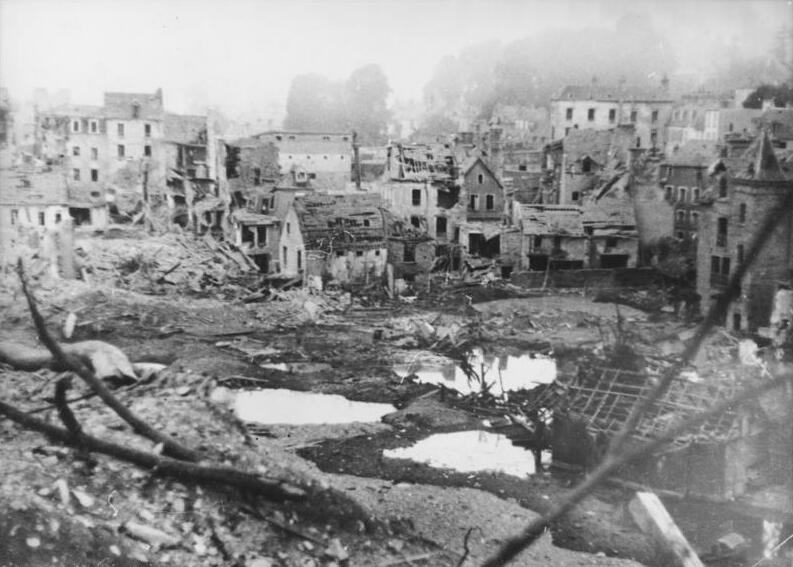
Saint-Lô after U.S. bombing, July 1944

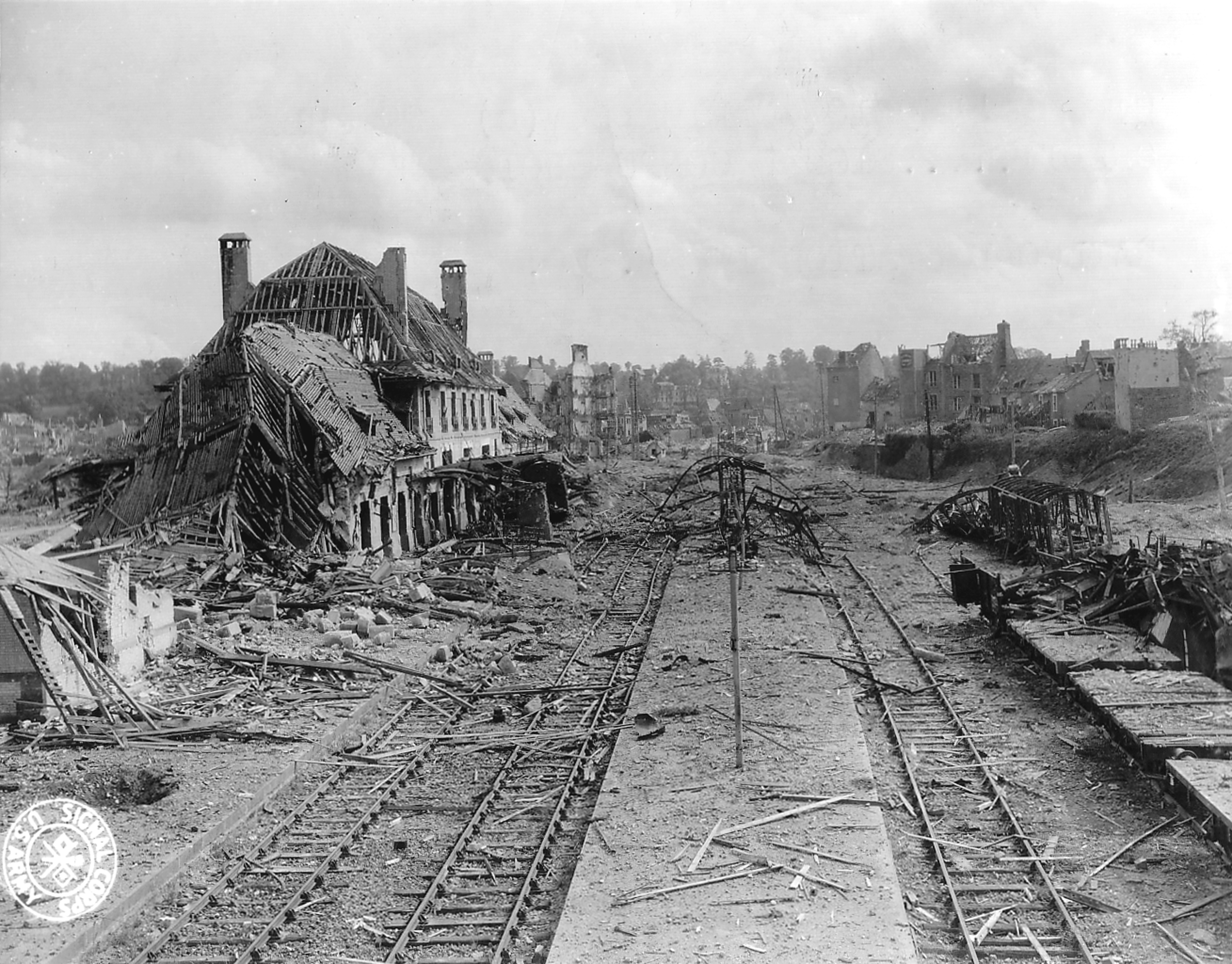
Saint-Lô Train Station ruins

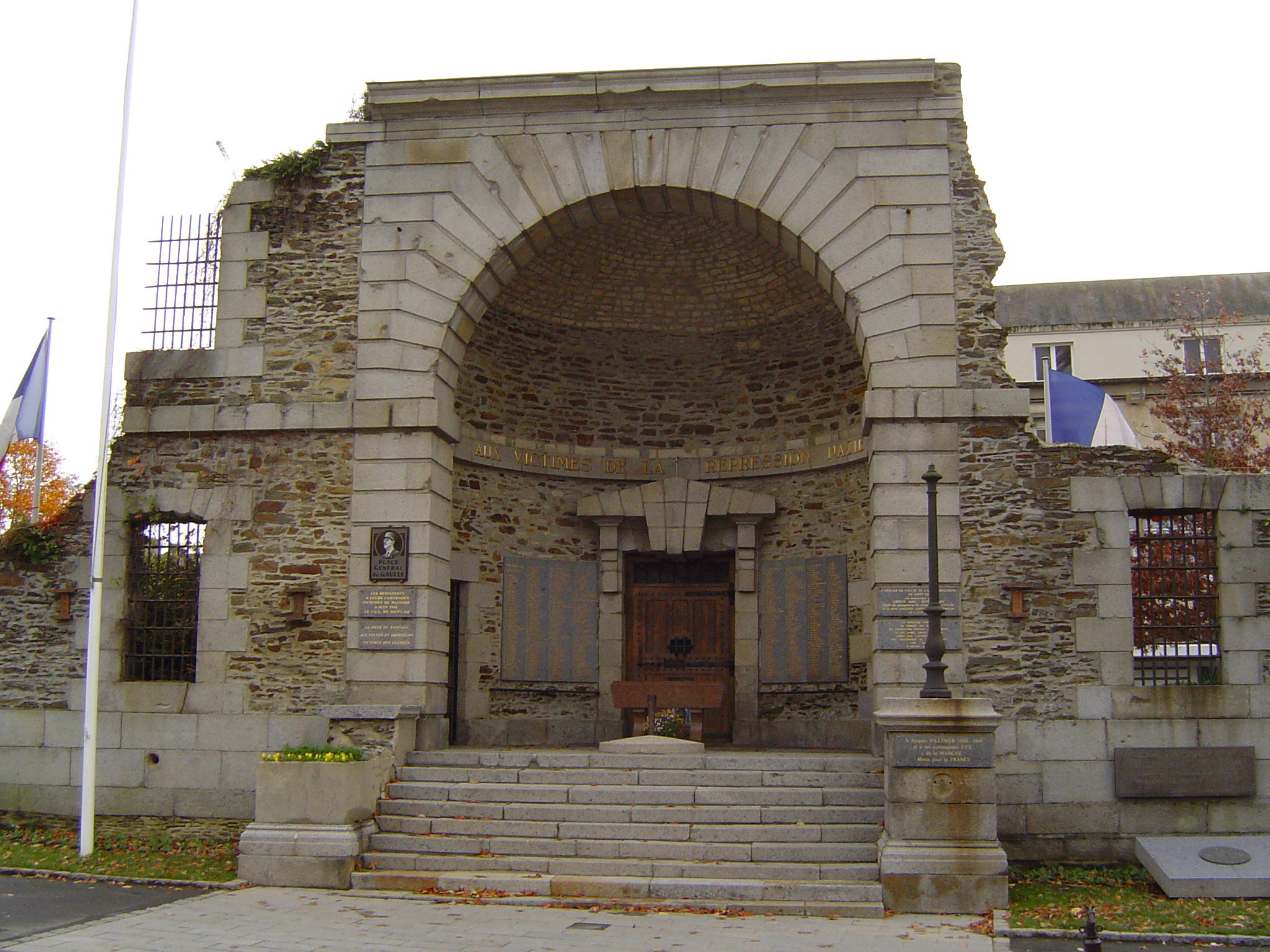
The old prison gate

== Battle ==
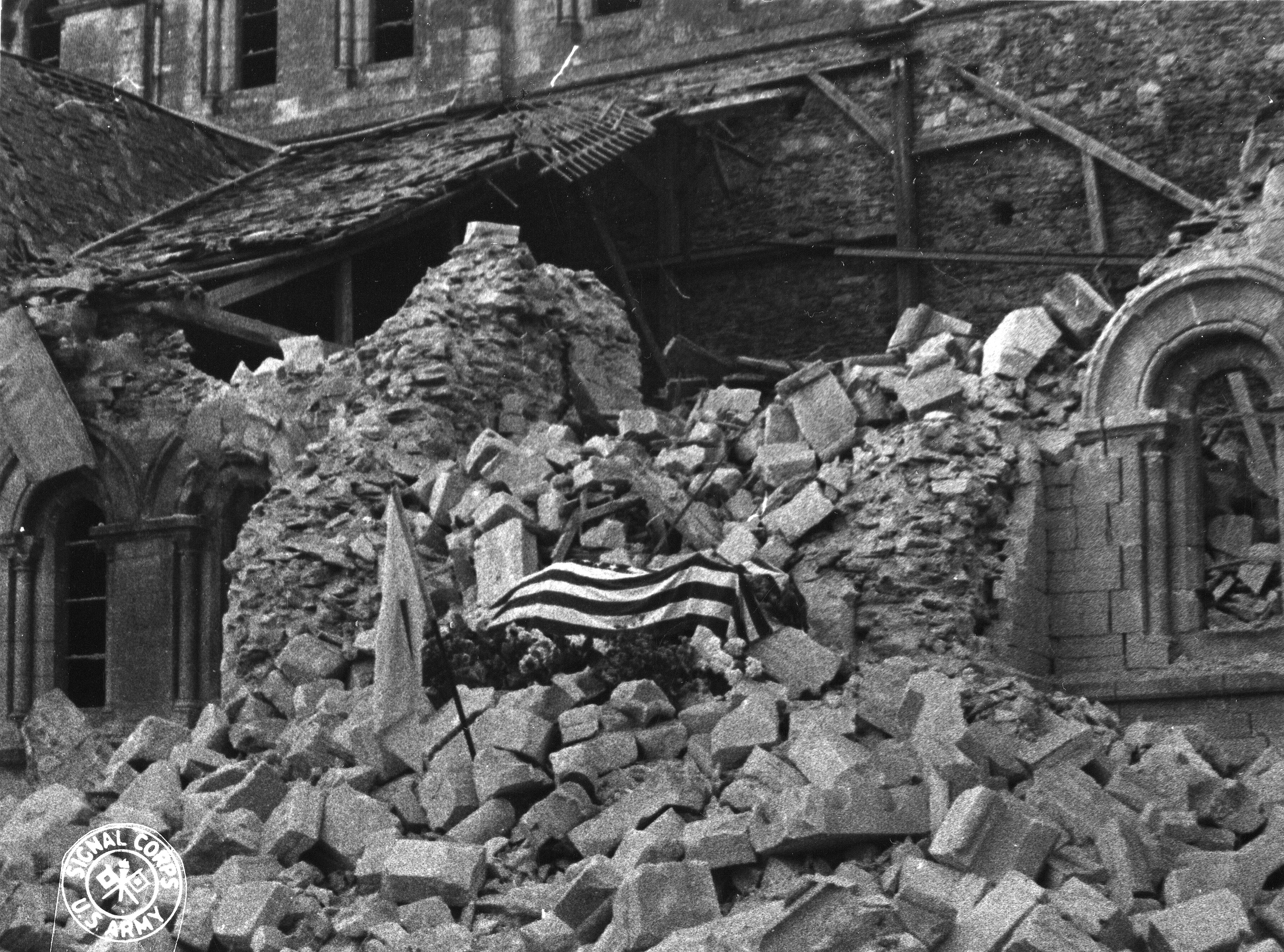
Major Howie's flag-draped body on the cathedral rubble

The task of taking control of Saint-Lô was entrusted to the XIX Corps of the First United States Army, under General Charles H. Corlett. As of July 15, 1944, the corps included:

- The 29th Infantry Division, located on the Bayeux road from La Luzerne to Saint-André-de-l'Épine and moving southwest into the city. It was commanded by Major General Charles H. Gerhardt.
- The 30th Infantry Division, located on the road to Périers to the west of Saint-Lô, near Le Mesnil-Durand, commanded by Major General Leland S. Hobbs.
- The 35th Infantry Division, located on the Isigny road and fighting south to Saint-Lô in a line extending from Pont-Hébert to the vicinity of Hill 122, commanded by Major General Paul W. Baade.

Opposing them, the German army had two divisions protecting the Saint-Lô front:

- The 352nd Infantry Division, commanded by Generalleutnant Dietrich Kraiß.
- The 3rd Division of the 2nd Parachute Corps, commanded by General der Fallschirmtruppe Eugen Meindl.

=== The 29th Infantry Division enters the city ===
The 29th Infantry Division attacked through the hedgerows to the northeast of Saint-Lô, near the Madeleine quarter, taking heavy casualties. On July 15, the 1st Battalion of the 116th Infantry Regiment, led by Major Sidney Bingham (called the "lost battalion"), unwittingly advanced ahead of other division elements and found itself isolated 1,000 yards east of Saint-Lô for an entire day without ammunition and with little food. They had 25 wounded, with only three medics, and were surrounded by German forces. Planes were called in to drop plasma. Martainville hill was continuously showered by German artillery. On July 17, the 3rd Battalion, 116th Infantry, under Major Thomas D. Howie, joined up with the "lost battalion" around 4:30 in the morning. Hidden by dense vegetation, the 3rd Battalion had orders not to return enemy fire, and use only their bayonets. The mission was successful, but Howie was fatally wounded by a mortar shell explosion. Their position was then heavily attacked, preventing any further movement that day.

On July 17, Captain William Puntenney, Major Howie's executive officer, requested artillery and air support to disperse the German troops. Short of munitions, still at the crossroads of the Madeleine, they found themselves at a mine depot, abandoned by the Germans. Meanwhile, the 115th Infantry Regiment passed through La Luzerne, deploying at the bottom of the Dollée Valley. On July 18, a company from the 116th established position along the Madeleine and the Germans retreated west to Rampan. An operations group was placed under the direction of General Norman Cota to form Task Force C. Around 3:00 p.m., the tanks along the road to Isigny were followed by ranks of soldiers. They fought their way into the Bascule district of Saint-Lô, near the Saint-Croix (Holy Cross) church.

When Major Howie died of his wounds, room was needed in the ambulance for the living wounded, and his body was placed on the hood of the lead jeep, symbolically making him the first American soldier to enter the city. His body was then placed on some rubble and draped in a flag, in a photo that was widely circulated. Andy Rooney, who witnessed the event as a Stars and Stripes reporter, called this "one of the truly heartwarming and emotional scenes of a gruesome and frightful war".

== Legacy ==
In memory of this battle, the United States Navy escort carrier Midway (CVE-63) was renamed USS St. Lo on October 10, 1944. The ship was sunk on October 25, 1944, during the Battle of Leyte Gulf, by a kamikaze attack.

In 1946, Samuel Beckett wrote a piece of reportage called "The Capital of the Ruins", in which he referred to the city as having been "bombed out of existence in one night". On 2 June 1948, the city was decorated with both the Legion of Honour and the Croix de Guerre.

A monument to Major Howie, the "Major of St-Lô", was erected in the city (see adjacent photo), near the cemetery.

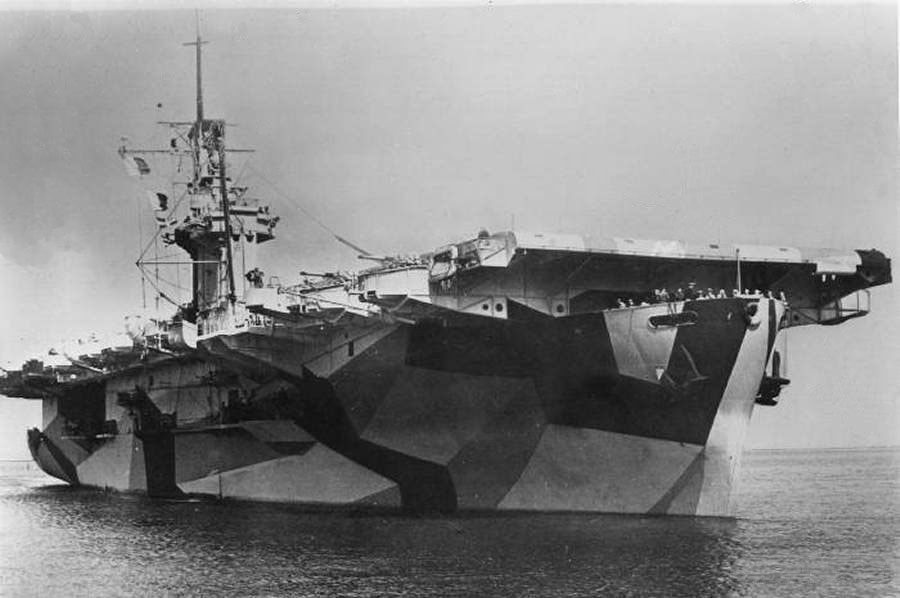
USS St. Lo

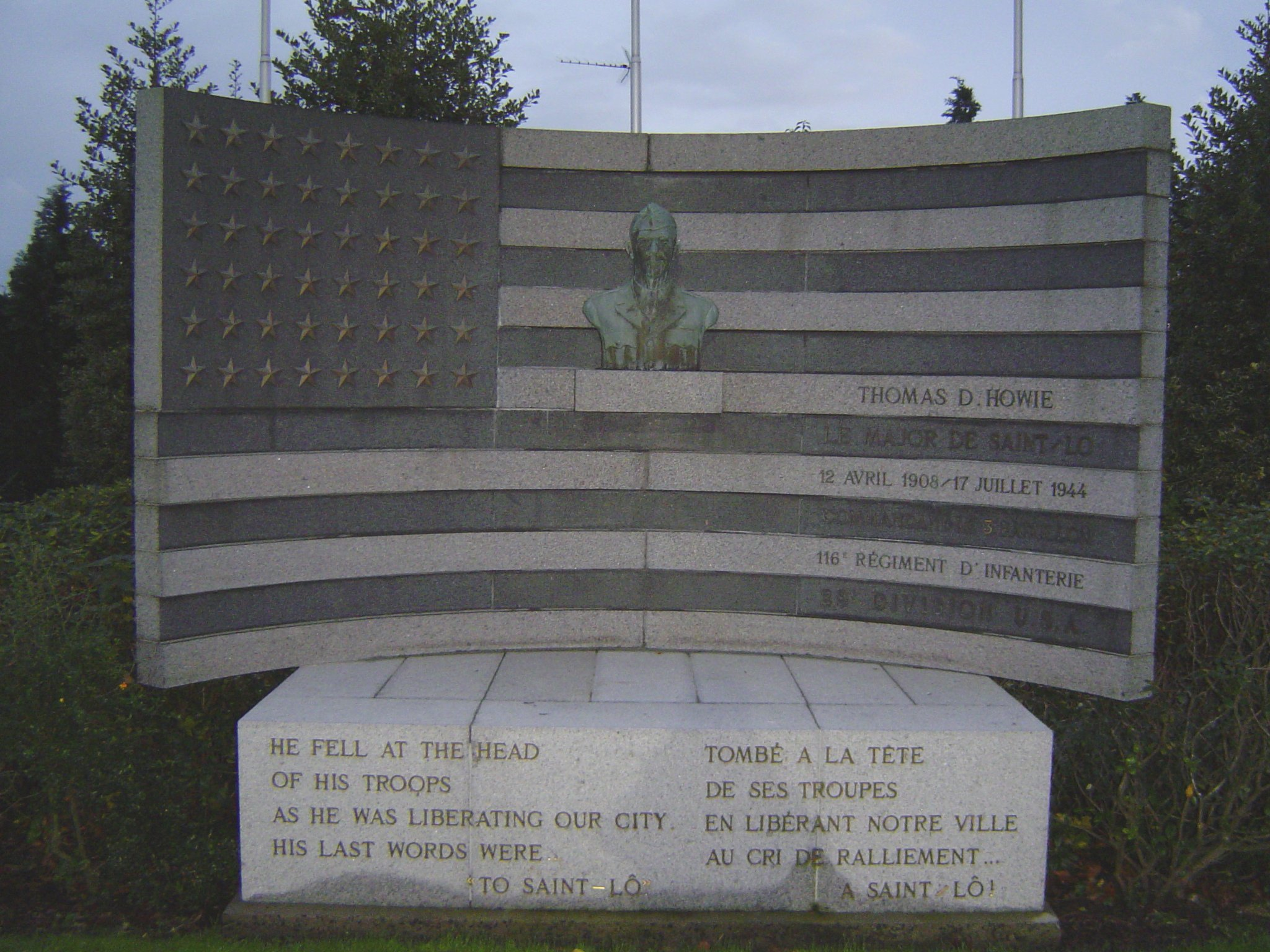
Major Howie Memorial Monument

== See also ==
- Liberation of France
- Operation Overlord
- Marble of Thorigny
