= Vire (river) =

River in France

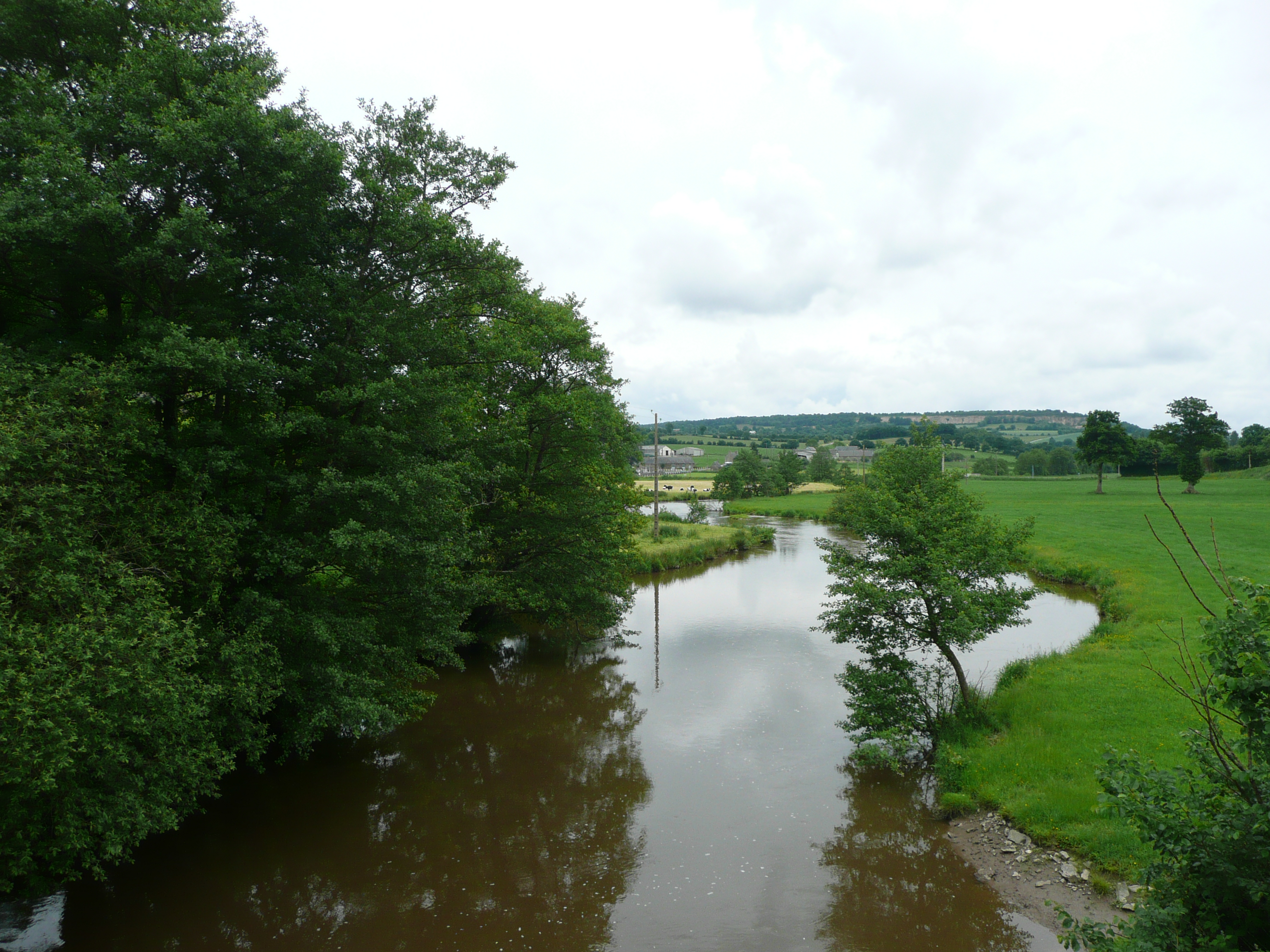
- Vire at Pont-Farcy

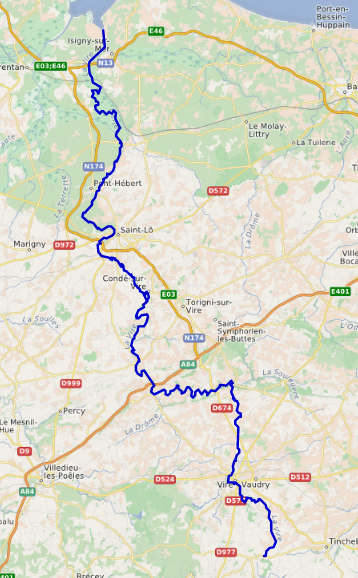
- Native name: La Vire (French)

Location
- Country: France

Physical characteristics
- Source
  - location: Normandy
  - elevation: 300 m (980 ft)
- Mouth
  - location: English Channel
  - coordinates: 49°21′24″N 1°7′13″W
- Length: 128 km (80 mi)
- Basin size: 1,240 km^{2} (480 sq mi)

The Vire (French pronunciation: [viʁ]) is a river in Normandy, France whose 128 km (80 mi) course crosses the départements of Calvados and Manche, flowing through the towns of Vire, Saint-Lô and Isigny-sur-Mer, finally flowing out into the English Channel. Its main tributaries are the Aure, the Elle and the Souleuvre.

The outflow of the Vire has been canalized and forms the port of Isigny-sur-Mer.

The poets of the Vire valley (Vau de Vire) are said to have given rise to vaudeville.

Places along the river:

- Calvados (14) : Vire, Pont-Farcy, Isigny-sur-Mer
- Manche (50) : Tessy-sur-Vire, Troisgots, Torigni-sur-Vire, Condé-sur-Vire, Sainte-Suzanne-sur-Vire, Saint-Lô, Rampan, Pont-Hébert, La Meauffe, Cavigny

== Hydrology and water quality ==
The generally brownish waters of the Vire are moderately alkaline having been tested by Lumina Tech as pH 8.31. The river waters are relatively turbid, with a Secchi disc measurement of 12 centimetres.

== Historical significance ==
At the turn of the 10th century, the territorial lands of the Kingdom of Brittany had been expanded up to the Vire by their king Alan I.
