= Saint-Jean-de-Daye =

- Commune
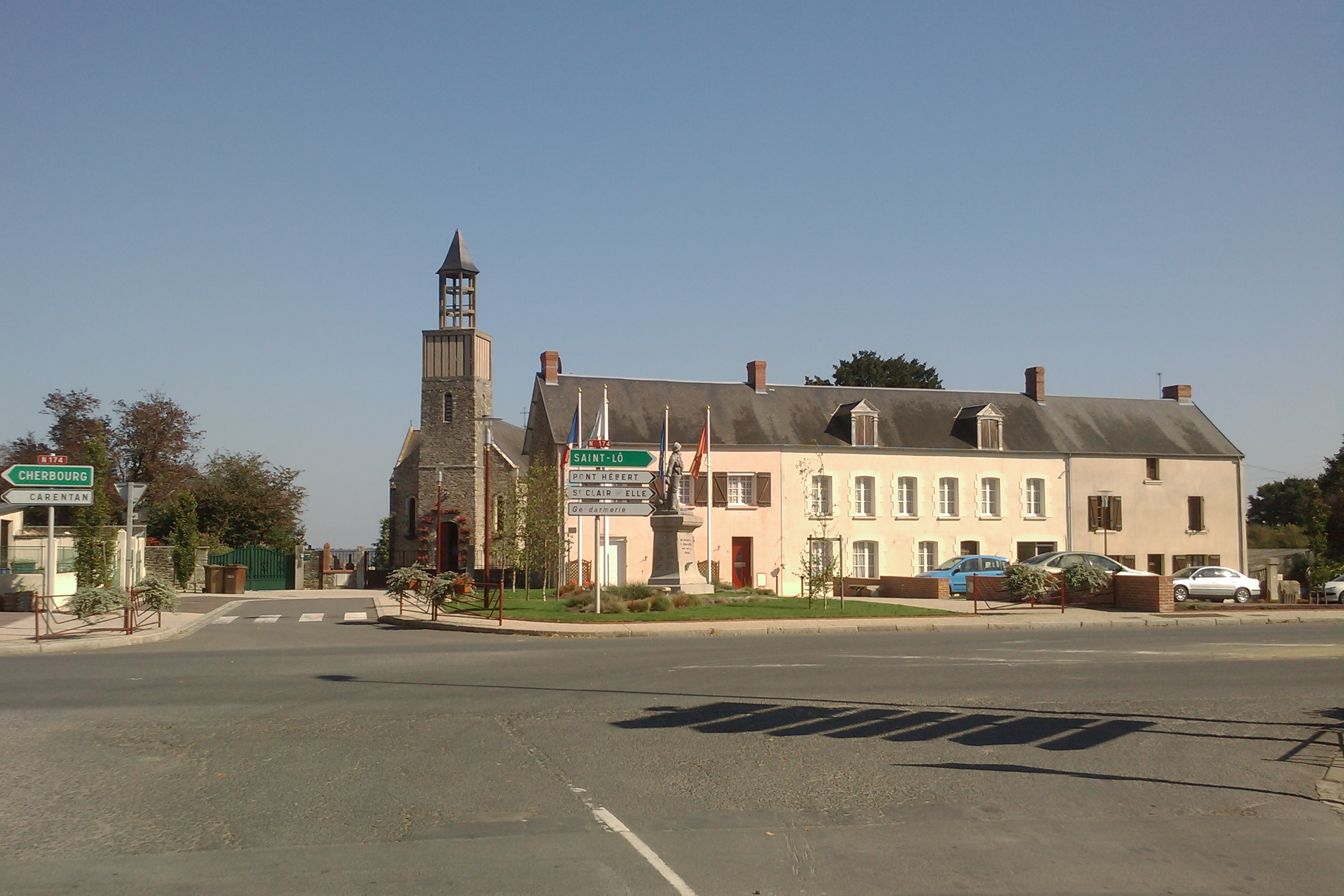
- The church
- Location of Saint-Jean-de-Daye
- Location within France Location within Normandy
- Coordinates: 49°13′43″N 1°08′12″W
- Country: France
- Region: Normandy
- Department: Manche
- Arrondissement: Saint-Lô
- Canton: Pont-Hébert
- Intercommunality: Saint-Lô Agglo

Government
  - Mayor (2020–2026): Nicole Godard
- Area^{1}: 4.24 km^{2} (1.64 sq mi)
- Elevation: 43 m (141 ft)
- Highest elevation: 47 m (154 ft)
- Lowest elevation: 0 m (0 ft)
- Population (2023): 656
  - Density: 155/km^{2} (401/sq mi)
- Time zone: UTC+01:00 (CET)
  - Summer (DST): UTC+02:00 (CEST)
- INSEE/Postal code: 50488 /50620
- ^{1} French Land Register data, which excludes lakes, ponds, glaciers > 1 km^{2} (0.386 sq mi or 247 acres) and river estuaries.

Saint-Jean-de-Daye (French pronunciation: [sɛ̃ ʒɑ̃ də dɛ]) is a commune in the Manche department in Normandy in north-western France.

== History ==
In 1839, Saint-Jean-de-Daye, having recorded just 352 registered inhabitants in 1836, absorbed the adjacent Le Mesnil-Véneron commune of 200 people. However, the ensuing decade saw economic and demographic growth and in 1847 Le Mesnil-Véneron was reinstated as a separate commune.

== See also ==
- Communes of the Manche department
