= Saint-Louet-sur-Vire =

- Commune
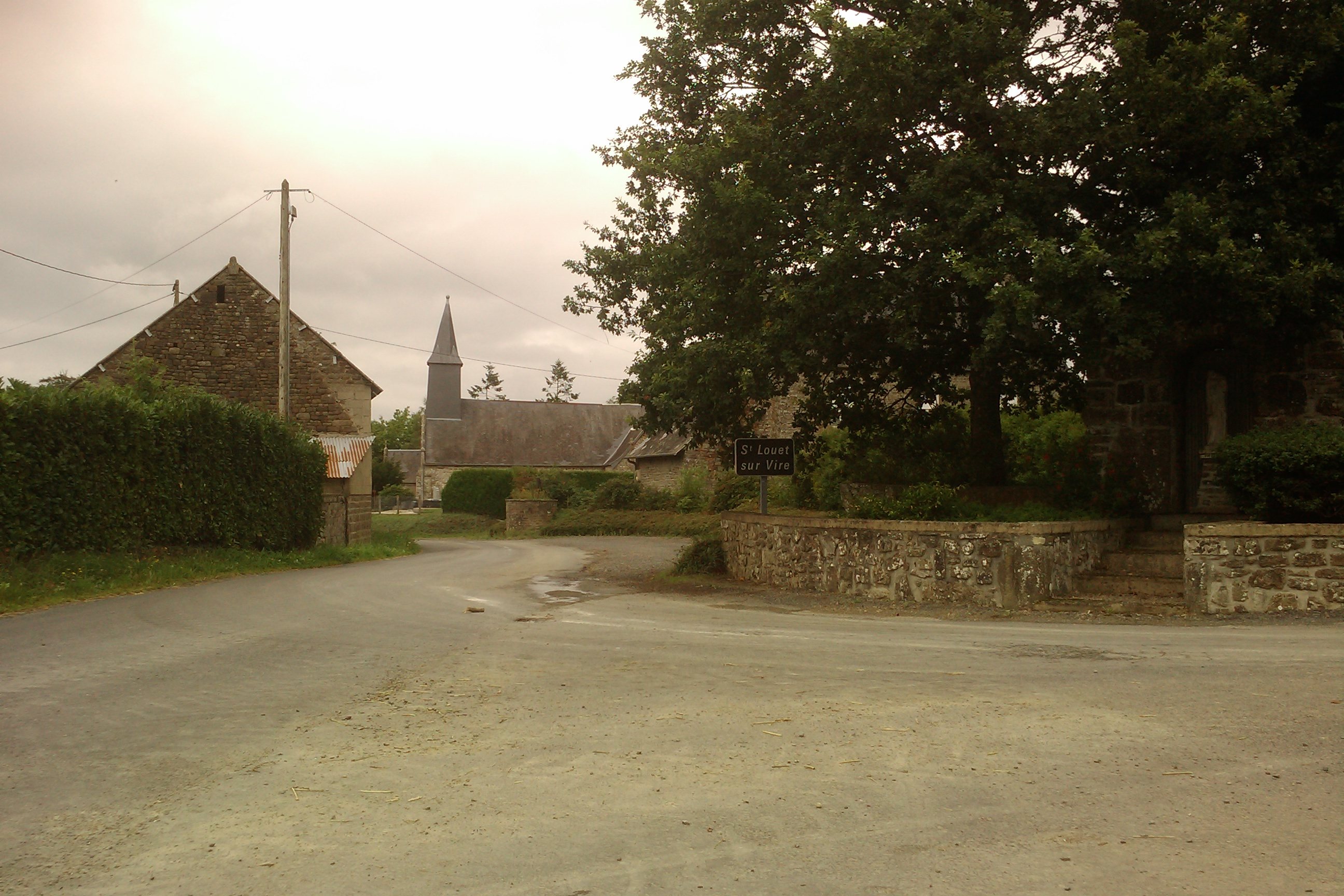
- The road into Saint-Louet-sur-Vire
- Location of Saint-Louet-sur-Vire
- Location within France Location within Normandy
- Coordinates: 48°59′32″N 0°59′27″W
- Country: France
- Region: Normandy
- Department: Manche
- Arrondissement: Saint-Lô
- Canton: Condé-sur-Vire
- Intercommunality: Saint-Lô Agglo

Government
  - Mayor (2020–2026): Françoise Louis
- Area^{1}: 7.33 km^{2} (2.83 sq mi)
- Elevation: 121 m (397 ft)
- Highest elevation: 172 m (564 ft)
- Lowest elevation: 60 m (200 ft)
- Population (2023): 210
  - Density: 29/km^{2} (74/sq mi)
- Time zone: UTC+01:00 (CET)
  - Summer (DST): UTC+02:00 (CEST)
- INSEE/Postal code: 50504 /50420
- ^{1} French Land Register data, which excludes lakes, ponds, glaciers > 1 km^{2} (0.386 sq mi or 247 acres) and river estuaries.

Saint-Louet-sur-Vire (French pronunciation: [sɛ̃ lwɛ syʁ viʁ], literally Saint-Louet on Vire) is a commune in the Manche department in Normandy in north-western France.

== See also ==
- Communes of the Manche department
