= Radford Semele =

Village in Warwickshire, England

Coordinates: 52.277000°N 1.496000°W

- Location within Warwickshire
- Population: 2,488 (2021 census)
- OS grid reference: SP344644
- Civil parish: Radford Semele
- District: Warwick
- Shire county: Warwickshire
- Region: West Midlands
- Country: England
- Sovereign state: United Kingdom
- Post town: Leamington Spa
- Postcode district: CV31
- Police: Warwickshire
- Fire: Warwickshire
- Ambulance: West Midlands

Radford Semele /ˈrædfərd ˈsɛmɪli/ is a village and civil parish in Warwickshire, England, situated close to the Regency spa town of Leamington Spa. According to the 2001 Census, Radford Semele parish has a population of 2,448, according to 2021 census. It lies on the A425 route between central Leamington (2 miles to the west) and Southam (5.5 miles to the southeast). It has a 16th-century pub with a priest hole. The local school is the Radford Semele Church of England School. This is a primary school and most senior pupils go to school in either Southam, Leamington Spa or Warwick which are close by. As well as the parish church of St Nicholas the village also has a second church built in 1874, the Radford Semele Baptist Church.

== History ==
A poorly preserved Roman villa was excavated in 1974 near Pounce Hill Farm, approximately 1 mile (1.5 km) south of the village. The village is named after a family from Saint-Pierre-de-Semilly in Normandy - they were lords of the manor in around 1120. The old Weedon to Leamington Spa line used to run through the village but in the late 1960s the line was closed to passengers. The site of where the old line used to be is now a new cycleway as part of The National Cycle Network.

The village has a 16th-century pub called The White Lion situated on the main road running through the village. On 2 February 2006 the pub caught alight, ruining the thatched roof and interior. As of January 2011 the pub is open again.

== St Nicholas Church ==
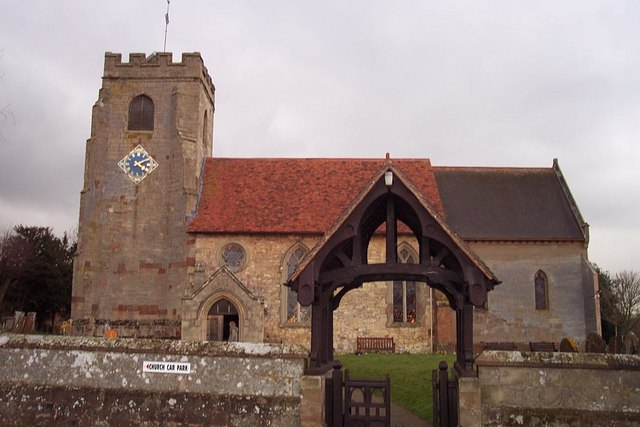
St Nicholas Church in 2005

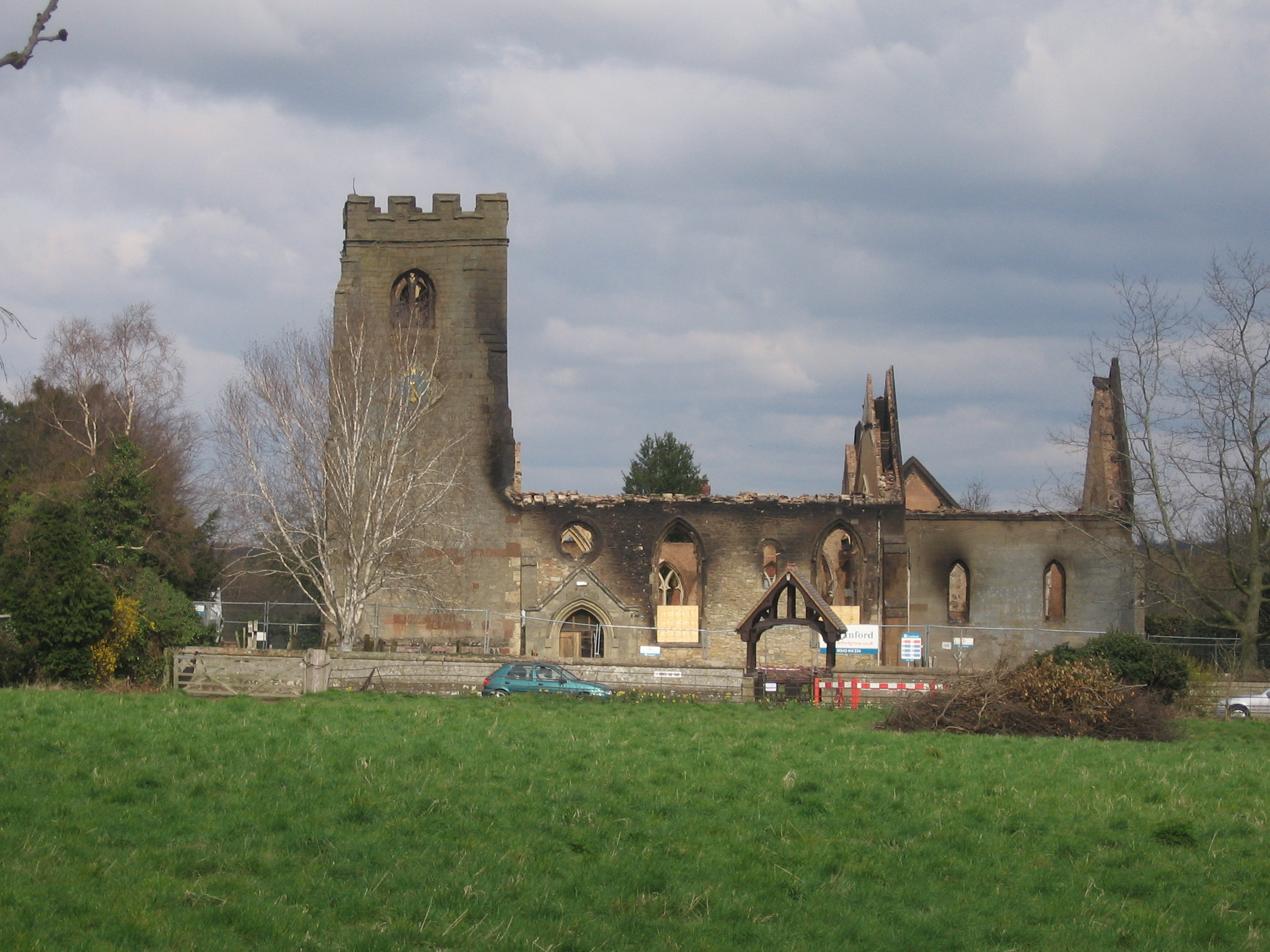
St Nicholas Church following fire of 2008

St Nicholas Church, a Grade II listed building, that caught fire on 16 March 2008 and all that remained was the tower and shell of the building. The fire was initially not considered suspicious; however, there is evidence that there was a break-in on the night of the fire, and it is believed to have been arson following failed attempts at several other churches nearby. The church has since been restored and was reopened on 15 May 2013.
