= Villiers-Fossard =

- Commune
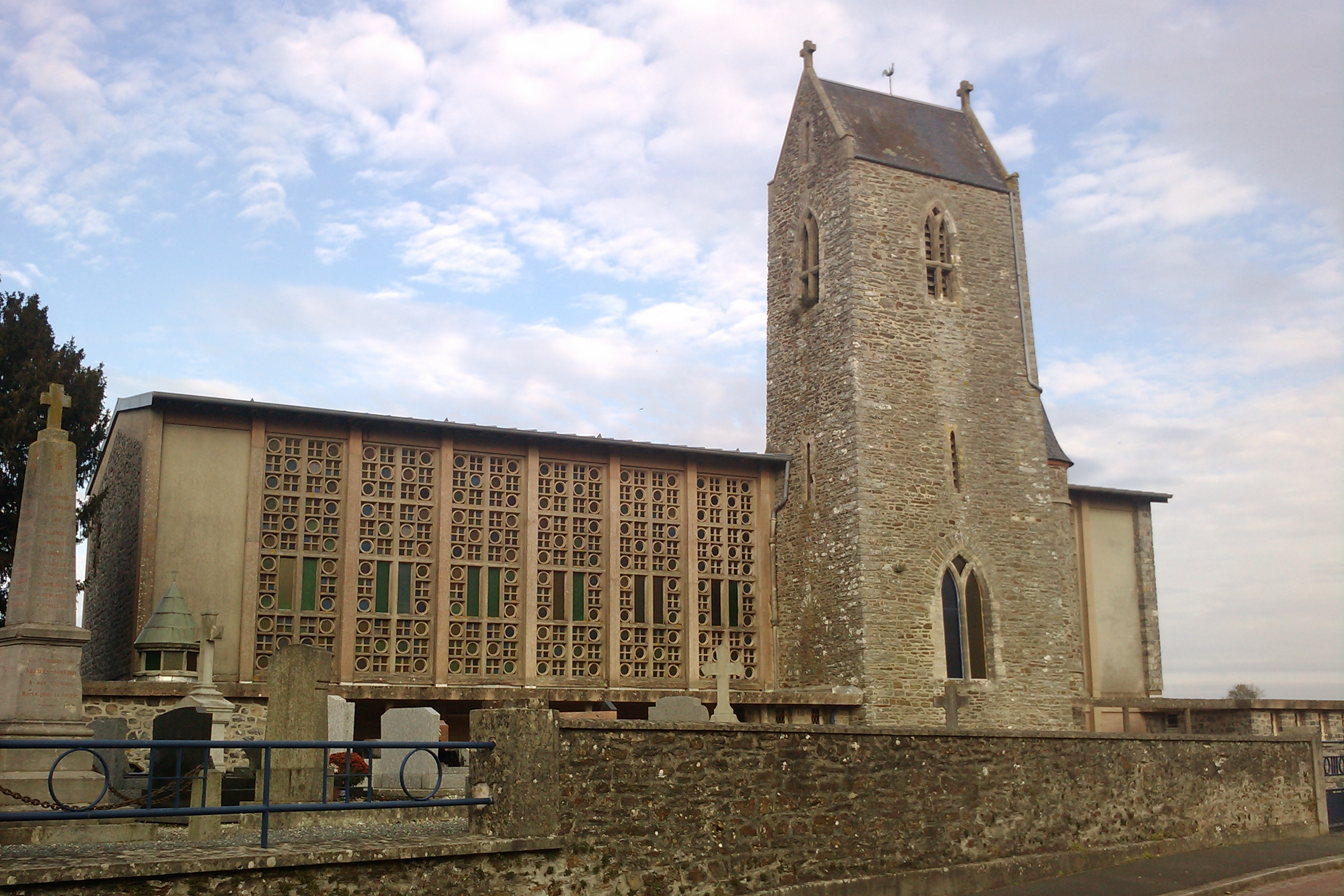
- The church of Saint-Pierre
- Location of Villiers-Fossard
- Location within France Location within Normandy
- Coordinates: 49°09′27″N 1°03′31″W
- Country: France
- Region: Normandy
- Department: Manche
- Arrondissement: Saint-Lô
- Canton: Pont-Hébert
- Intercommunality: Saint-Lô Agglo

Government
  - Mayor (2020–2026): Wilfried Guillemet
- Area^{1}: 8.52 km^{2} (3.29 sq mi)
- Elevation: 90 m (300 ft)
- Highest elevation: 133 m (436 ft)
- Lowest elevation: 20 m (66 ft)
- Population (2023): 646
  - Density: 75.8/km^{2} (196/sq mi)
- Time zone: UTC+01:00 (CET)
  - Summer (DST): UTC+02:00 (CEST)
- INSEE/Postal code: 50641 /50680
- ^{1} French Land Register data, which excludes lakes, ponds, glaciers > 1 km^{2} (0.386 sq mi or 247 acres) and river estuaries.

Villiers-Fossard (French pronunciation: [vilje fosaʁ]) is a commune in the Manche department in Normandy in north-western France.

== History ==
During World War II, the town was in the middle of heavy fighting that took place on the 29th of June 1944. Allied forces managed to liberate the town despite suffering heavy casualties - including 151 men, 31 tanks and 12 miscellaneous vehicles.

== Heraldry ==
Arms of Villiers-Fossard	The arms of Villiers-Fossard are blazoned : Azure, a chevron Or between 3 eagles argent, within a bordure Or.

== See also ==
- Communes of the Manche department
