= Saint-Lô Agglo =

- Communauté d'agglomération
- Interactive map of Saint-Lô Agglo
- Coordinates: 49°05′N 01°05′W
- Country: France
- Region: Normandy
- Department: Manche
- No. of communes: {{{nbcomm}}}
- Established: 2017
- Area: 819.9 km^{2} (316.6 sq mi)
- Population (2019): 76,116
  - Density: 92.84/km^{2} (240.4/sq mi)
- Website: www.saint-lo-agglo.fr

Saint-Lô Agglo is the communauté d'agglomération, an intercommunal structure, centred on the town of Saint-Lô. It is located in the Manche department, in the Normandy region, northwestern France. Created in 2017, its seat is in Saint-Lô. Its area is 819.9 km^{2}. Its population was 76,116 in 2019, of which 19,050 in Saint-Lô proper.

== Composition ==
The communauté d'agglomération consists of the following 61 communes:

1. Agneaux
2. Airel
3. Amigny
4. La Barre-de-Semilly
5. Baudre
6. Beaucoudray
7. Bérigny
8. Beuvrigny
9. Biéville
10. Bourgvallées
11. Canisy
12. Carantilly
13. Cavigny
14. Cerisy-la-Forêt
15. Condé-sur-Vire
16. Couvains
17. Dangy
18. Le Dézert
19. Domjean
20. Fourneaux
21. Gouvets
22. Graignes-Mesnil-Angot
23. Lamberville
24. Le Lorey
25. La Luzerne
26. Le Perron
27. Marigny-le-Lozon
28. La Meauffe
29. Le Mesnil-Amey
30. Le Mesnil-Eury
31. Le Mesnil-Rouxelin
32. Le Mesnil-Véneron
33. Montrabot
34. Montreuil-sur-Lozon
35. Moon-sur-Elle
36. Moyon Villages
37. Pont-Hébert
38. Quibou
39. Rampan
40. Remilly Les Marais
41. Saint-Amand-Villages
42. Saint-André-de-l'Épine
43. Saint-Clair-sur-l'Elle
44. Sainte-Suzanne-sur-Vire
45. Saint-Fromond
46. Saint-Georges-d'Elle
47. Saint-Georges-Montcocq
48. Saint-Germain-d'Elle
49. Saint-Gilles
50. Saint-Jean-de-Daye
51. Saint-Jean-d'Elle
52. Saint-Jean-de-Savigny
53. Saint-Lô
54. Saint-Louet-sur-Vire
55. Saint-Martin-de-Bonfossé
56. Saint-Pierre-de-Semilly
57. Saint-Vigor-des-Monts
58. Tessy-Bocage
59. Thèreval
60. Torigny-les-Villes
61. Villiers-Fossard
