= Moon-sur-Elle =

- Commune
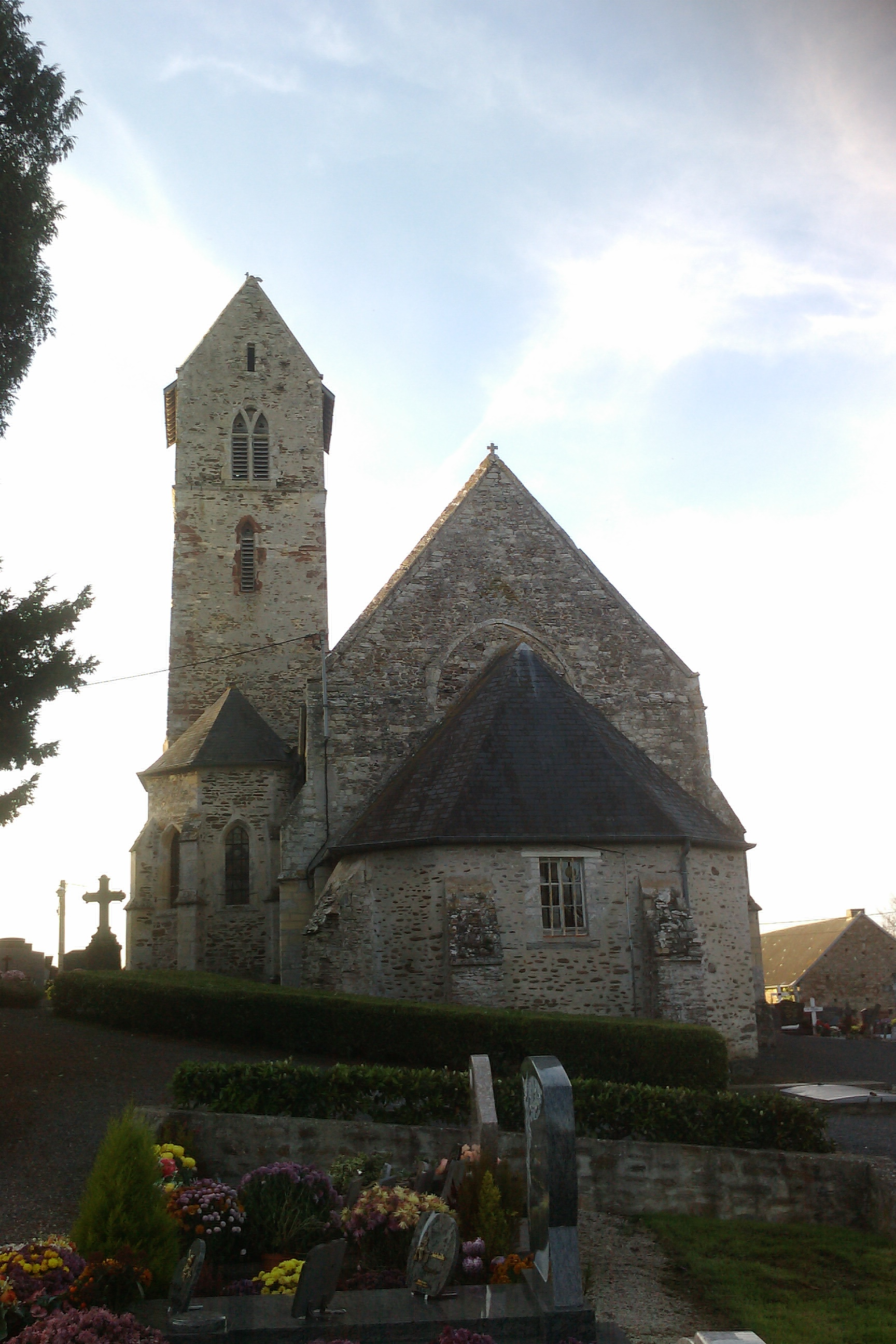
- The church of Notre-Dame
- Location of Moon-sur-Elle
- Location within France Location within Normandy
- Coordinates: 49°12′33″N 1°02′36″W
- Country: France
- Region: Normandy
- Department: Manche
- Arrondissement: Saint-Lô
- Canton: Pont-Hébert
- Intercommunality: Saint-Lô Agglo

Government
  - Mayor (2020–2026): Lydie Brotin
- Area^{1}: 9.84 km^{2} (3.80 sq mi)
- Elevation: 30 m (98 ft)
- Highest elevation: 48 m (157 ft)
- Lowest elevation: 3 m (9.8 ft)
- Population (2023): 781
  - Density: 79.4/km^{2} (206/sq mi)
- Time zone: UTC+01:00 (CET)
  - Summer (DST): UTC+02:00 (CEST)
- INSEE/Postal code: 50356 /50680
- ^{1} French Land Register data, which excludes lakes, ponds, glaciers > 1 km^{2} (0.386 sq mi or 247 acres) and river estuaries.

Moon-sur-Elle (French pronunciation: [mɔ̃ syʁ‿ɛl], literally Moon on Elle) is a commune in the Manche department in Normandy in north-western France.

== See also ==
- Communes of the Manche department
