= Le Dézert =

- Commune
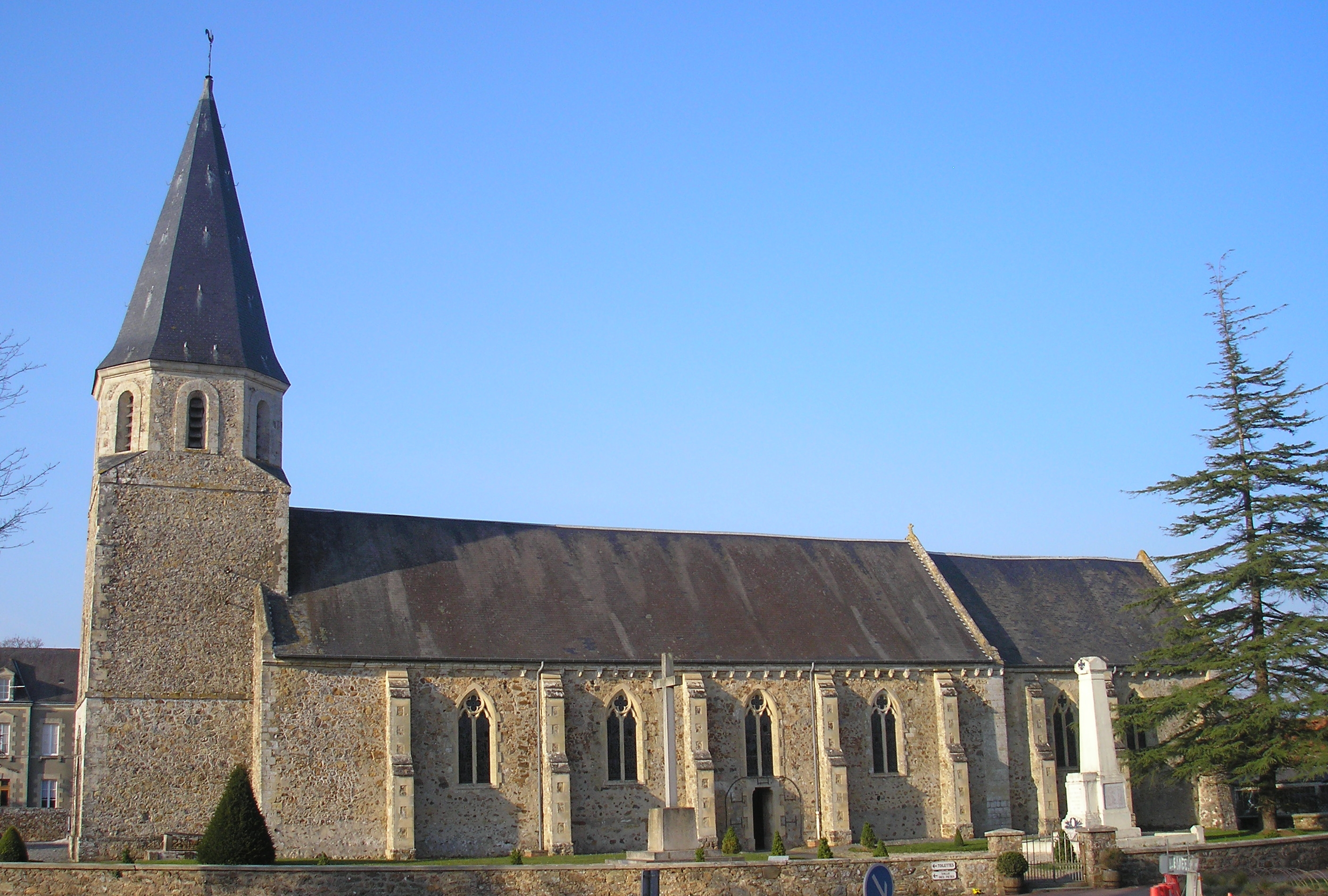
- The church of Saint-Martin
- Location of Le Dézert
- Location within France Location within Normandy
- Coordinates: 49°12′18″N 1°09′48″W
- Country: France
- Region: Normandy
- Department: Manche
- Arrondissement: Saint-Lô
- Canton: Pont-Hébert
- Intercommunality: Saint-Lô Agglo

Government
  - Mayor (2020–2026): Florence Mazier
- Area^{1}: 14.58 km^{2} (5.63 sq mi)
- Elevation: 38 m (125 ft)
- Highest elevation: 52 m (171 ft)
- Lowest elevation: 8 m (26 ft)
- Population (2023): 601
  - Density: 41.2/km^{2} (107/sq mi)
- Time zone: UTC+01:00 (CET)
  - Summer (DST): UTC+02:00 (CEST)
- INSEE/Postal code: 50161 /50620
- ^{1} French Land Register data, which excludes lakes, ponds, glaciers > 1 km^{2} (0.386 sq mi or 247 acres) and river estuaries.

Le Dézert (French pronunciation: [lə dezɛʁ]) is a commune in the Manche department in north-western France.

== See also ==
- Communes of the Manche department
