= Canton of Pont-Hébert =

Coordinates: 49.17°N 1.14°W

The canton of Pont-Hébert is an administrative division of the Manche department, northwestern France. It was created at the French canton reorganisation which came into effect in March 2015. Its seat is in Pont-Hébert.

It consists of the following communes:

1. Airel
2. Amigny
3. Bérigny
4. Carentan-les-Marais (partly)
5. Cavigny
6. Cerisy-la-Forêt
7. Couvains
8. Le Dézert
9. Graignes-Mesnil-Angot
10. La Meauffe
11. Le Mesnil-Rouxelin
12. Le Mesnil-Véneron
13. Moon-sur-Elle
14. Pont-Hébert
15. Rampan
16. Saint-André-de-l'Épine
17. Saint-Clair-sur-l'Elle
18. Saint-Fromond
19. Saint-Georges-d'Elle
20. Saint-Georges-Montcocq
21. Saint-Germain-d'Elle
22. Saint-Jean-de-Daye
23. Saint-Jean-de-Savigny
24. Saint-Pierre-de-Semilly
25. Tribehou
26. Villiers-Fossard
