= Saint-Fromond =

- Commune
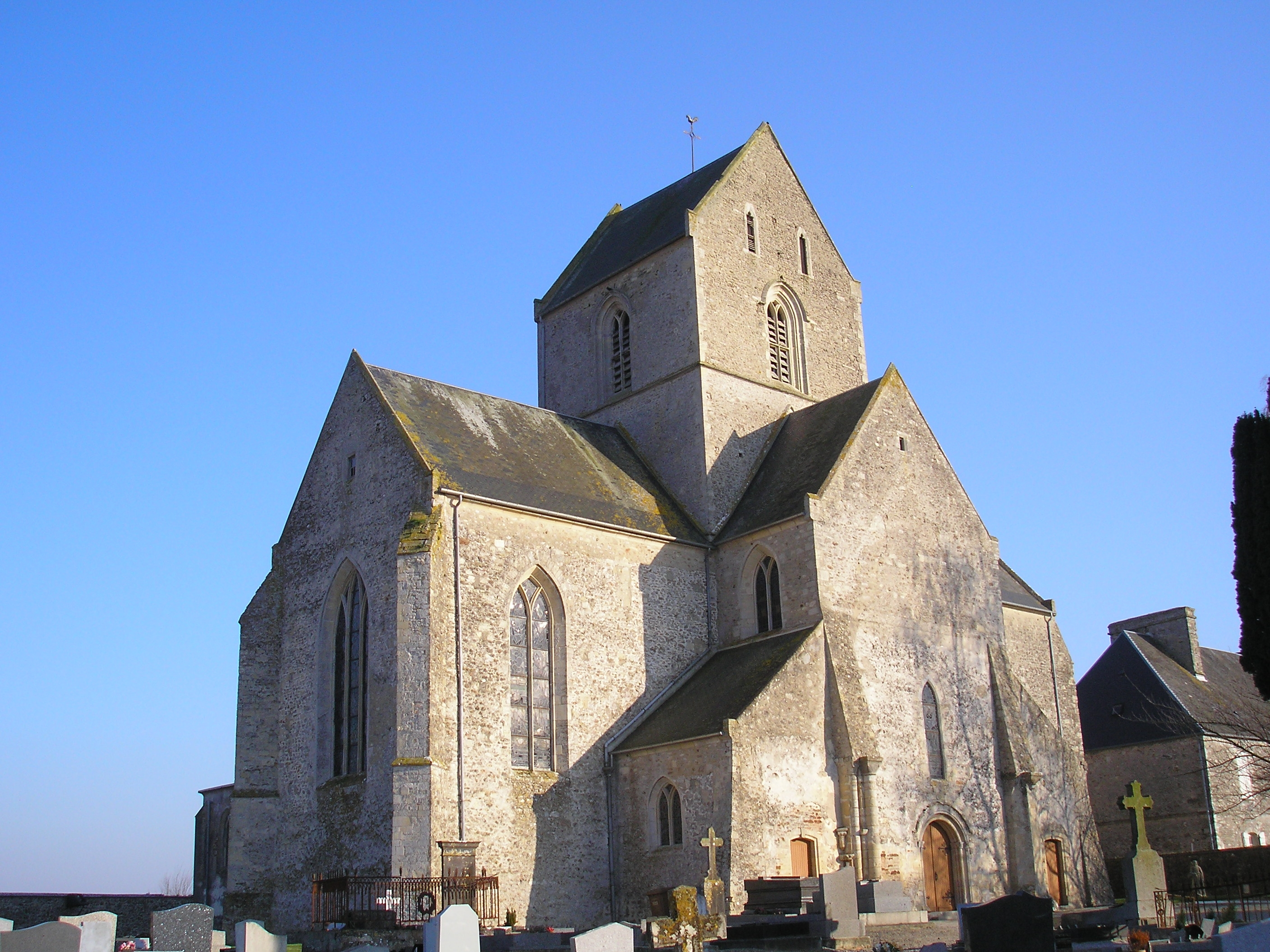
- The church in Saint-Fromond

- Coat of arms
- Location of Saint-Fromond
- Location within France Location within Normandy
- Coordinates: 49°13′17″N 1°05′24″W
- Country: France
- Region: Normandy
- Department: Manche
- Arrondissement: Saint-Lô
- Canton: Pont-Hébert
- Intercommunality: Saint-Lô Agglo

Government
  - Mayor (2020–2026): Dominique Quinette
- Area^{1}: 15.52 km^{2} (5.99 sq mi)
- Elevation: 15 m (49 ft)
- Highest elevation: 53 m (174 ft)
- Lowest elevation: 0 m (0 ft)
- Population (2023): 758
  - Density: 48.8/km^{2} (126/sq mi)
- Demonym: Fromondais
- Time zone: UTC+01:00 (CET)
  - Summer (DST): UTC+02:00 (CEST)
- INSEE/Postal code: 50468 /50620
- ^{1} French Land Register data, which excludes lakes, ponds, glaciers > 1 km^{2} (0.386 sq mi or 247 acres) and river estuaries.

Saint-Fromond (French pronunciation: [sɛ̃ fʁɔmɔ̃]) is a commune in the Manche department in Normandy in north-western France.

== Heraldry ==
Arms of Saint-Fromond	The arms of Saint-Fromond are blazoned : Argent, 3 fleurs de lys gules. These arms are borrowed from the du Hommet family (extinct), former lords of Saint-Fromond and of the barony Hommet.

== See also ==
- Communes of the Manche department
