= Couvains, Manche =

Couvains
- Commune
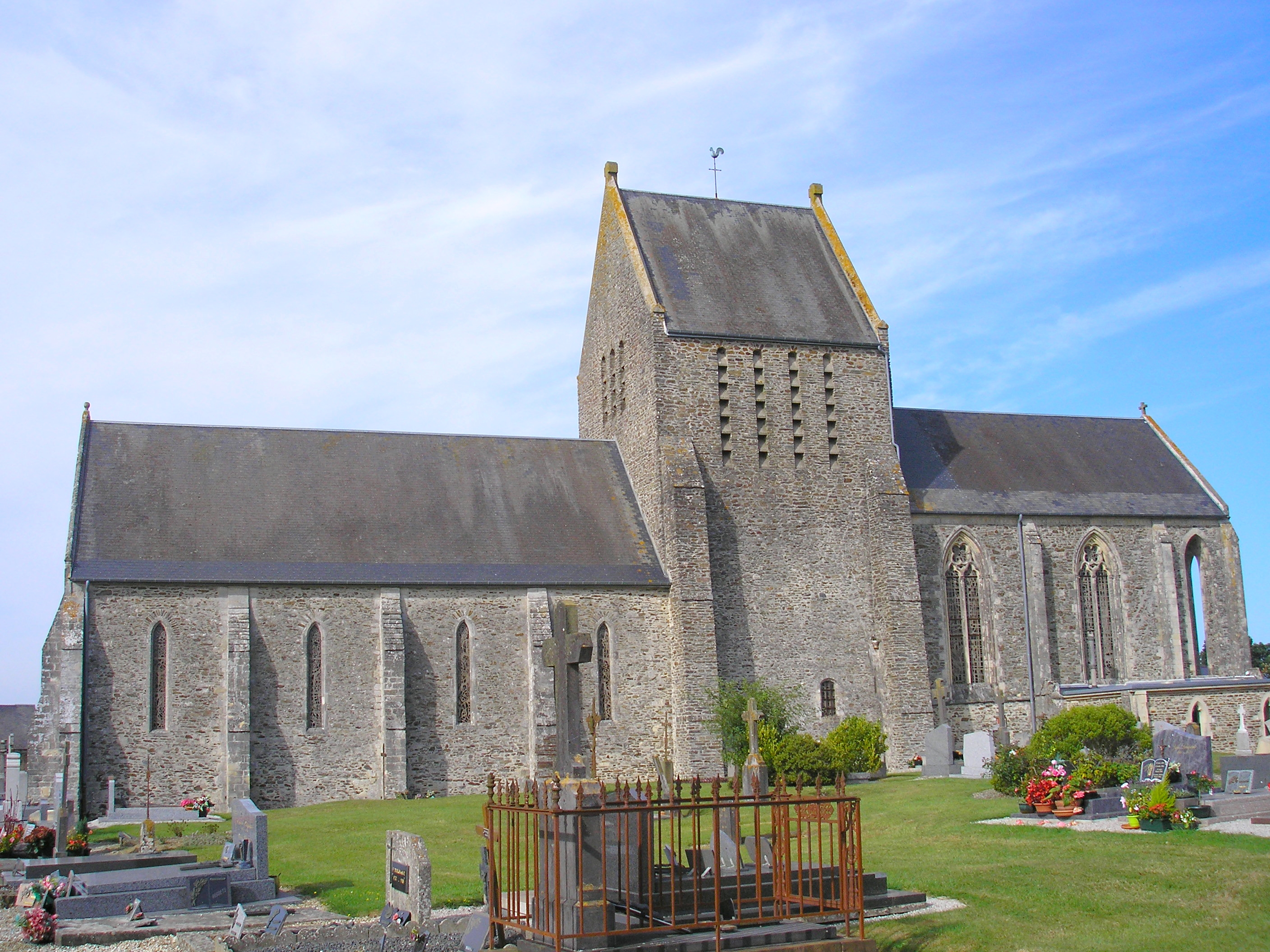
- The church of Notre-Dame
- Location of Couvains
- Location within France Location within Normandy
- Coordinates: 49°10′00″N 1°00′20″W
- Country: France
- Region: Normandy
- Department: Manche
- Arrondissement: Saint-Lô
- Canton: Pont-Hébert
- Intercommunality: Saint-Lô Agglo

Government
  - Mayor (2020–2026): Christian Périer
- Area^{1}: 15.03 km^{2} (5.80 sq mi)
- Elevation: 100 m (330 ft)
- Highest elevation: 147 m (482 ft)
- Lowest elevation: 59 m (194 ft)
- Population (2023): 562
  - Density: 37.4/km^{2} (96.8/sq mi)
- Time zone: UTC+01:00 (CET)
  - Summer (DST): UTC+02:00 (CEST)
- INSEE/Postal code: 50148 /50680
- ^{1} French Land Register data, which excludes lakes, ponds, glaciers > 1 km^{2} (0.386 sq mi or 247 acres) and river estuaries.

Couvains (French pronunciation: [kuvɛ̃]) is a commune in the Manche department in Normandy in north-western France.

== See also ==
- Communes of the Manche department
