= Saint-Georges-Montcocq =

- Commune
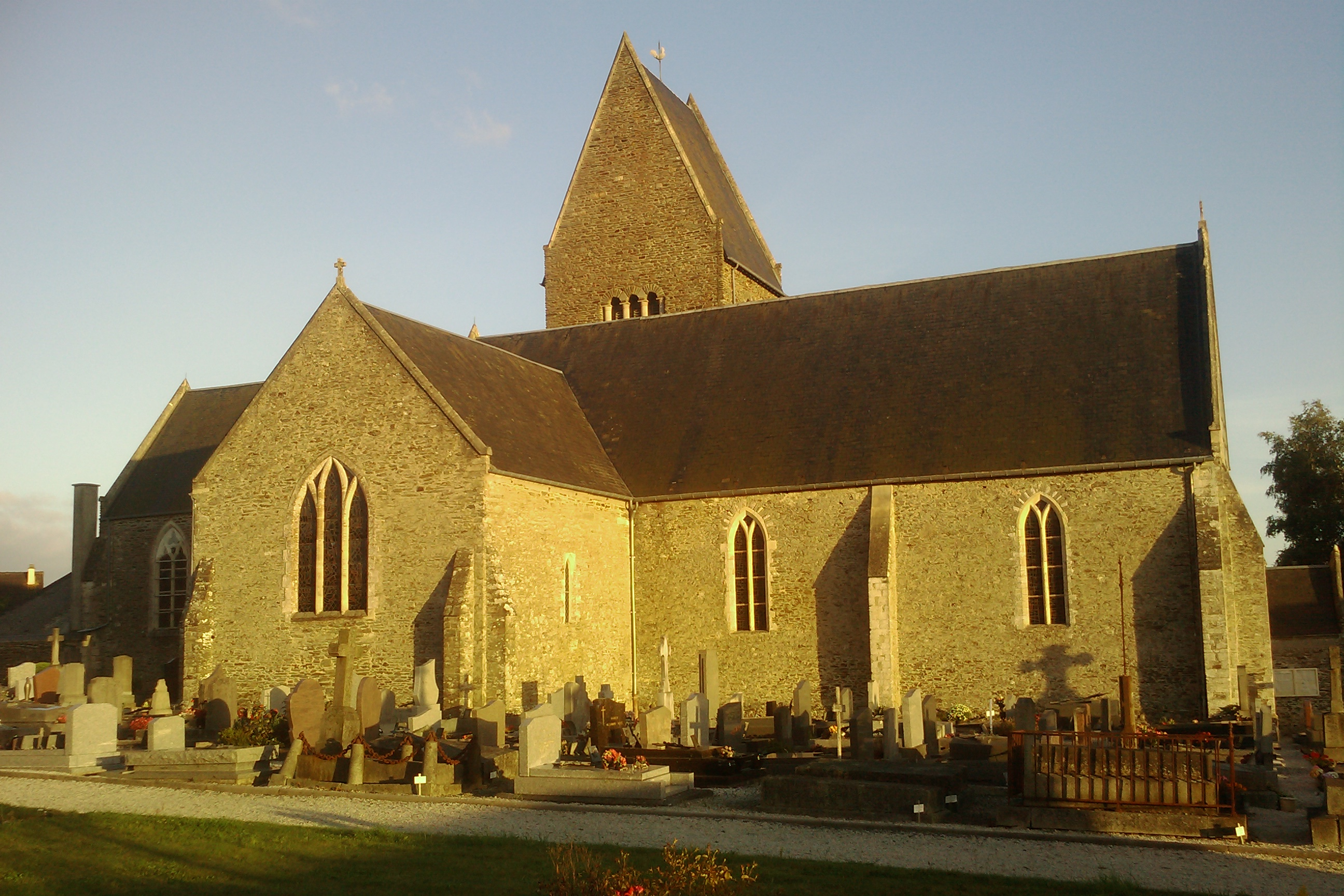
- The church in Saint-Georges-Montcocq
- Location of Saint-Georges-Montcocq
- Location within France Location within Normandy
- Coordinates: 49°07′45″N 1°05′33″W
- Country: France
- Region: Normandy
- Department: Manche
- Arrondissement: Saint-Lô
- Canton: Pont-Hébert
- Intercommunality: Saint-Lô Agglo

Government
  - Mayor (2020–2026): Jean-Yves Laurence
- Area^{1}: 8.94 km^{2} (3.45 sq mi)
- Elevation: 90 m (300 ft)
- Highest elevation: 126 m (413 ft)
- Lowest elevation: 7 m (23 ft)
- Population (2023): 988
  - Density: 111/km^{2} (286/sq mi)
- Time zone: UTC+01:00 (CET)
  - Summer (DST): UTC+02:00 (CEST)
- INSEE/Postal code: 50475 /50000
- ^{1} French Land Register data, which excludes lakes, ponds, glaciers > 1 km^{2} (0.386 sq mi or 247 acres) and river estuaries.

Saint-Georges-Montcocq (French pronunciation: [sɛ̃ ʒɔʁʒ mɔ̃kɔk]) is a commune in the Manche department in Normandy in north-western France.

== International relations ==
Saint-Georges-Montcocq is twinned with:

- Bransgore, United Kingdom

== See also ==
- Communes of the Manche department
