= Airel =

- Commune
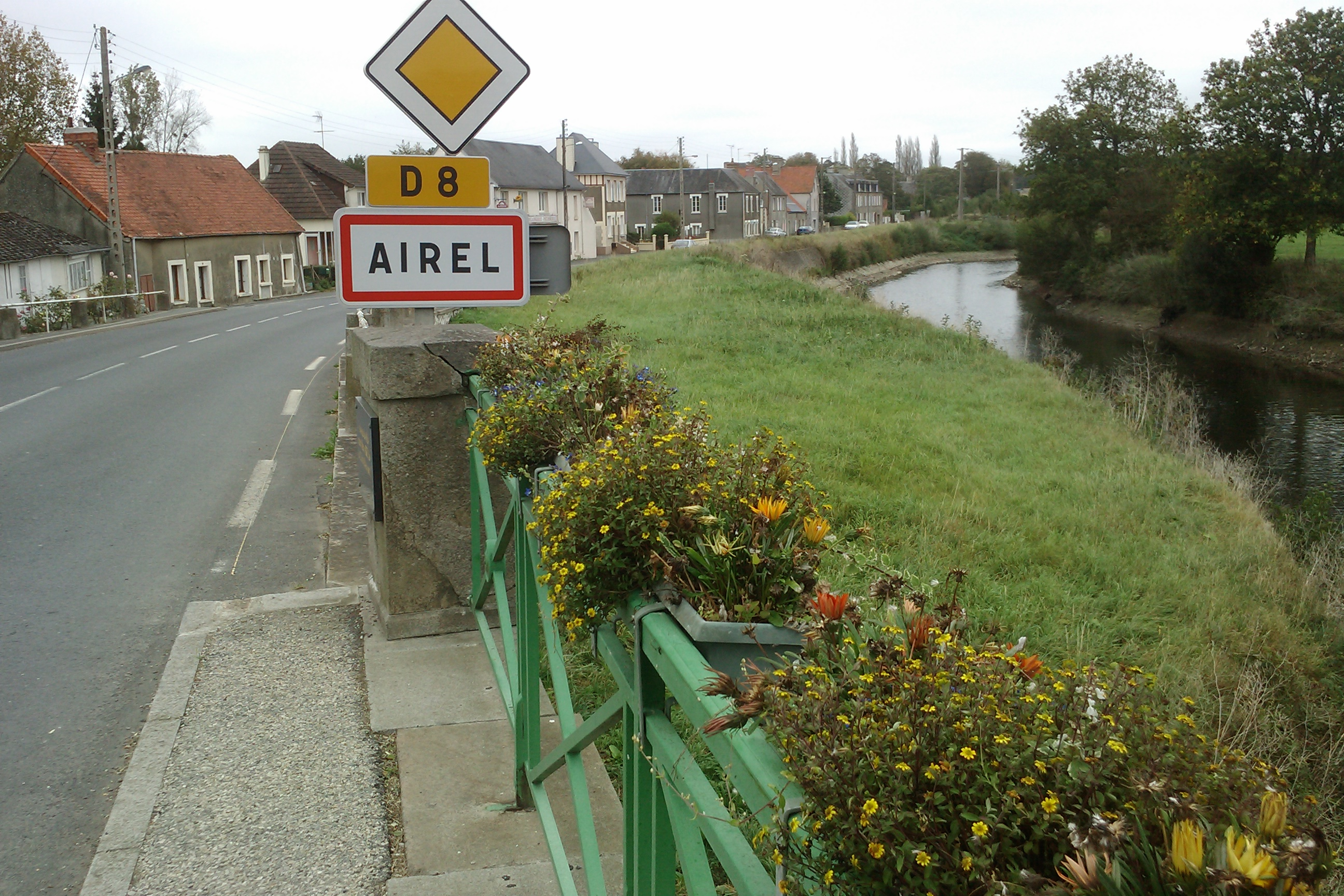
- View from the Saint-Fromond bridge
- Location of Airel
- Location within France Location within Normandy
- Coordinates: 49°12′50″N 1°04′30″W
- Country: France
- Region: Normandy
- Department: Manche
- Arrondissement: Saint-Lô
- Canton: Pont-Hébert
- Intercommunality: Saint-Lô Agglo

Government
  - Mayor (2020–2026): Jean-Pierre Branthonne
- Area^{1}: 10.17 km^{2} (3.93 sq mi)
- Elevation: 5 m (16 ft)
- Highest elevation: 44 m (144 ft)
- Lowest elevation: 1 m (3.3 ft)
- Population (2023): 515
  - Density: 50.6/km^{2} (131/sq mi)
- Time zone: UTC+01:00 (CET)
  - Summer (DST): UTC+02:00 (CEST)
- INSEE/Postal code: 50004 /50680
- ^{1} French Land Register data, which excludes lakes, ponds, glaciers > 1 km^{2} (0.386 sq mi or 247 acres) and river estuaries.

Airel (French pronunciation: [eʁɛl]) is a commune in the Manche department in the Normandy region in northwestern France.

== Population ==
Historical population
Year	Pop.	±% p.a.
1968	557	—
1975	534	−0.60%
1982	548	+0.37%
1990	526	−0.51%
1999	486	−0.87%
2007	515	+0.73%
2012	539	+0.92%
2017	547	+0.30%
2023	515	−1.00%
Source: INSEE

== See also ==
- Communes of the Manche department
