= Le Mesnil-Rouxelin =

- Commune
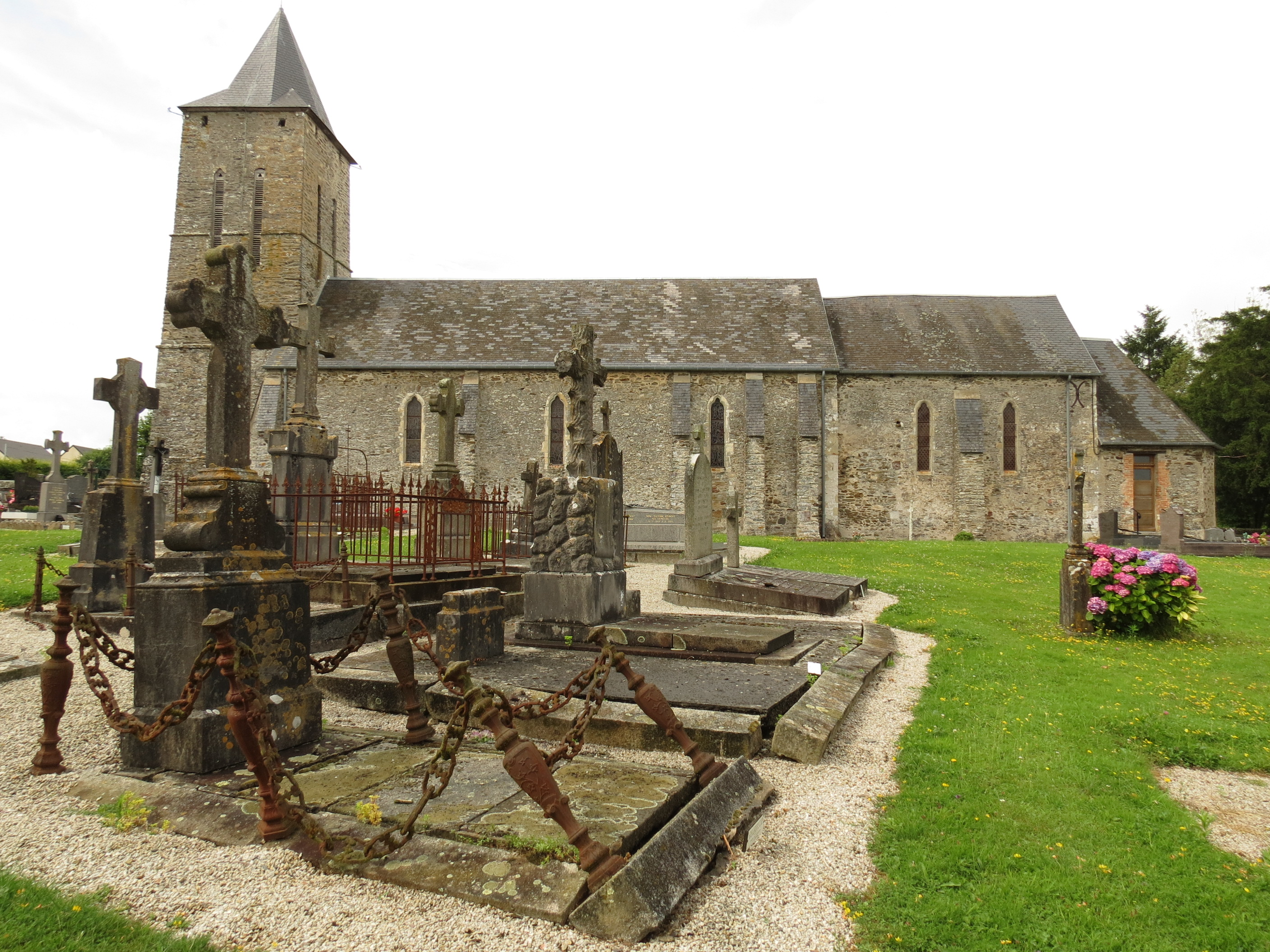
- The church of Notre-Dame and cemetery
- Location of Le Mesnil-Rouxelin
- Location within France Location within Normandy
- Coordinates: 49°08′55″N 1°05′07″W
- Country: France
- Region: Normandy
- Department: Manche
- Arrondissement: Saint-Lô
- Canton: Pont-Hébert
- Intercommunality: Saint-Lô Agglo

Government
  - Mayor (2020–2026): Philippe Richomme
- Area^{1}: 4.74 km^{2} (1.83 sq mi)
- Highest elevation: 137 m (449 ft)
- Lowest elevation: 65 m (213 ft)
- Population (2023): 469
  - Density: 98.9/km^{2} (256/sq mi)
- Time zone: UTC+01:00 (CET)
  - Summer (DST): UTC+02:00 (CEST)
- INSEE/Postal code: 50321 /50000
- ^{1} French Land Register data, which excludes lakes, ponds, glaciers > 1 km^{2} (0.386 sq mi or 247 acres) and river estuaries.

Le Mesnil-Rouxelin (French pronunciation: [lə mɛnil ʁuksəlɛ̃]) is a commune in the Manche department in Normandy in north-western France.

== See also ==
- Communes of the Manche department
