= La Meauffe =

- Commune
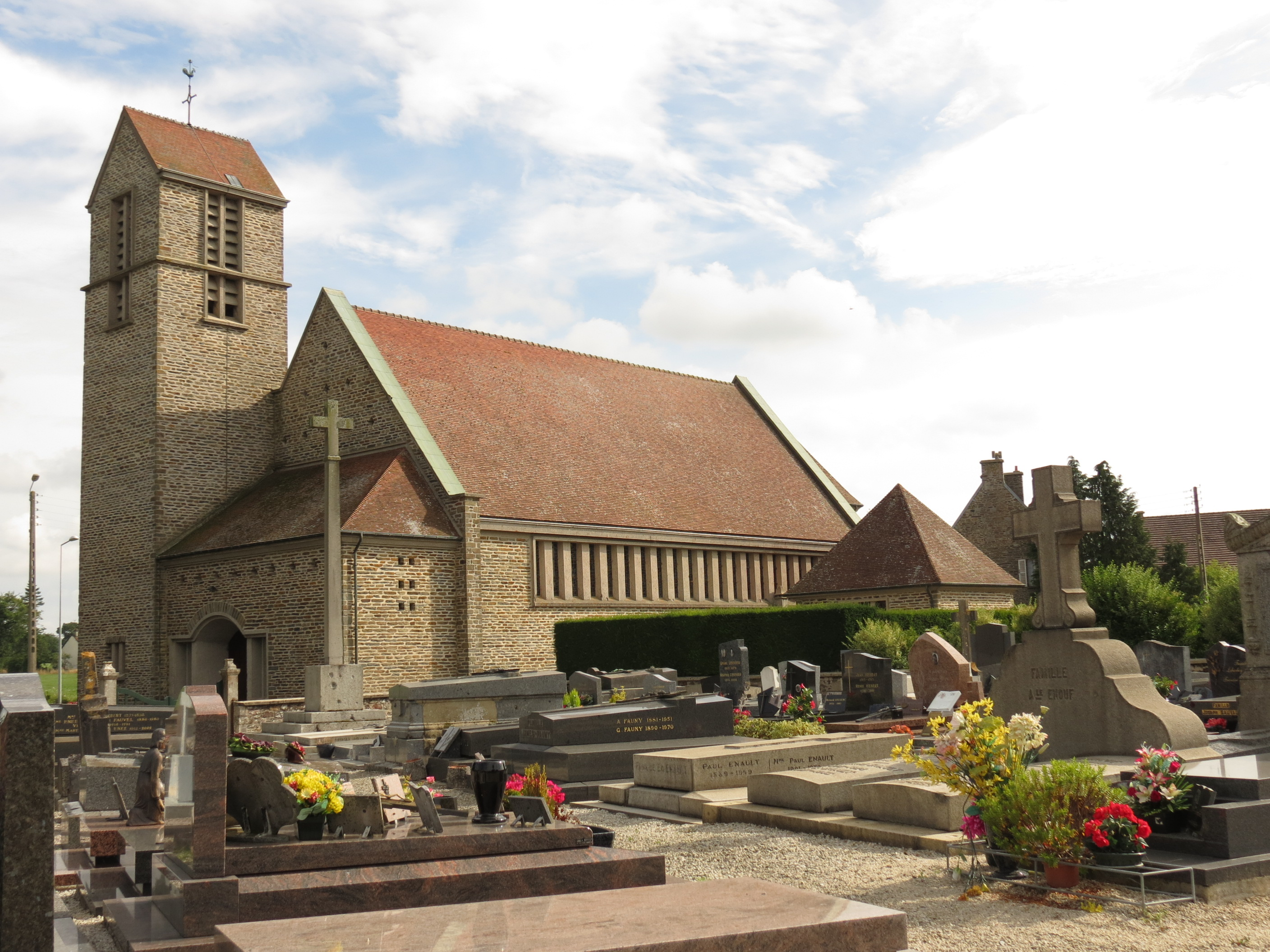
- The church, destroyed in July 1944 and rebuilt after the war

- Coat of arms
- Location of La Meauffe
- Location within France Location within Normandy
- Coordinates: 49°10′37″N 1°06′34″W
- Country: France
- Region: Normandy
- Department: Manche
- Arrondissement: Saint-Lô
- Canton: Pont-Hébert
- Intercommunality: Saint-Lô Agglo

Government
  - Mayor (2020–2026): Pascal Langlois
- Area^{1}: 10.22 km^{2} (3.95 sq mi)
- Highest elevation: 87 m (285 ft)
- Lowest elevation: 4 m (13 ft)
- Population (2023): 993
  - Density: 97.2/km^{2} (252/sq mi)
- Demonym: Meauffois
- Time zone: UTC+01:00 (CET)
  - Summer (DST): UTC+02:00 (CEST)
- INSEE/Postal code: 50297 /50880
- Website: la-meauffe.fr
- ^{1} French Land Register data, which excludes lakes, ponds, glaciers > 1 km^{2} (0.386 sq mi or 247 acres) and river estuaries.

La Meauffe (French pronunciation: [la mof]) is a commune in the Manche department in Normandy in north-western France.

== History ==
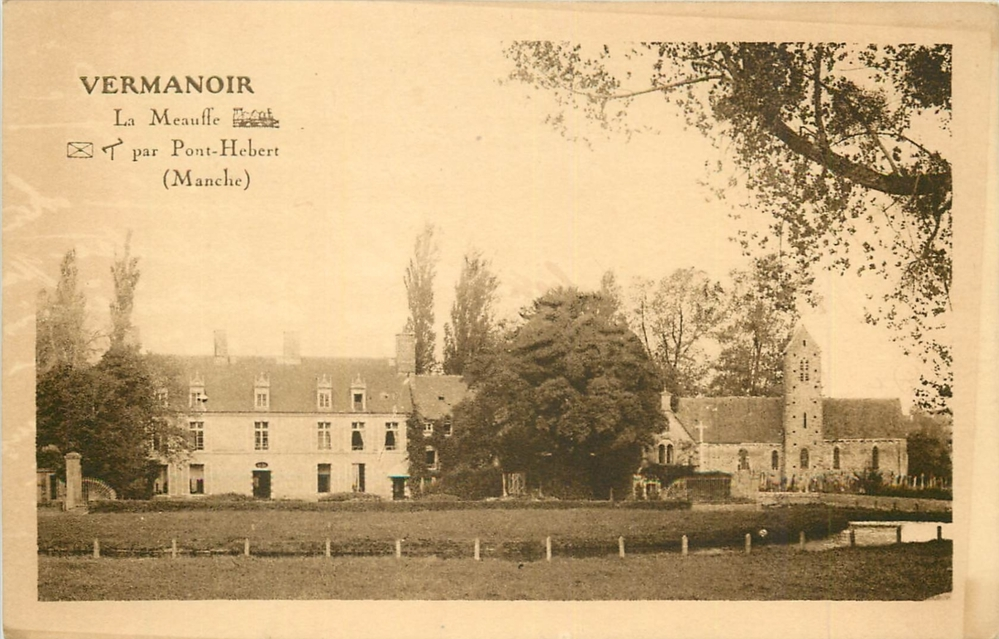
Church and manor prior the fighting in 1944.

On the 11 and 12 July 1944, the village was attacked by the 35th Infantry Division (United States) while defended by the German 352 ID and units of the 266 ID. The fighting, violent, started the 11th and ended the 12th, cost the lives of 19 US soldiers, wounding 170, with 25 missing. The road D54, leading to La Meauffe was renamed the Death Valley Road by the US soldiers.

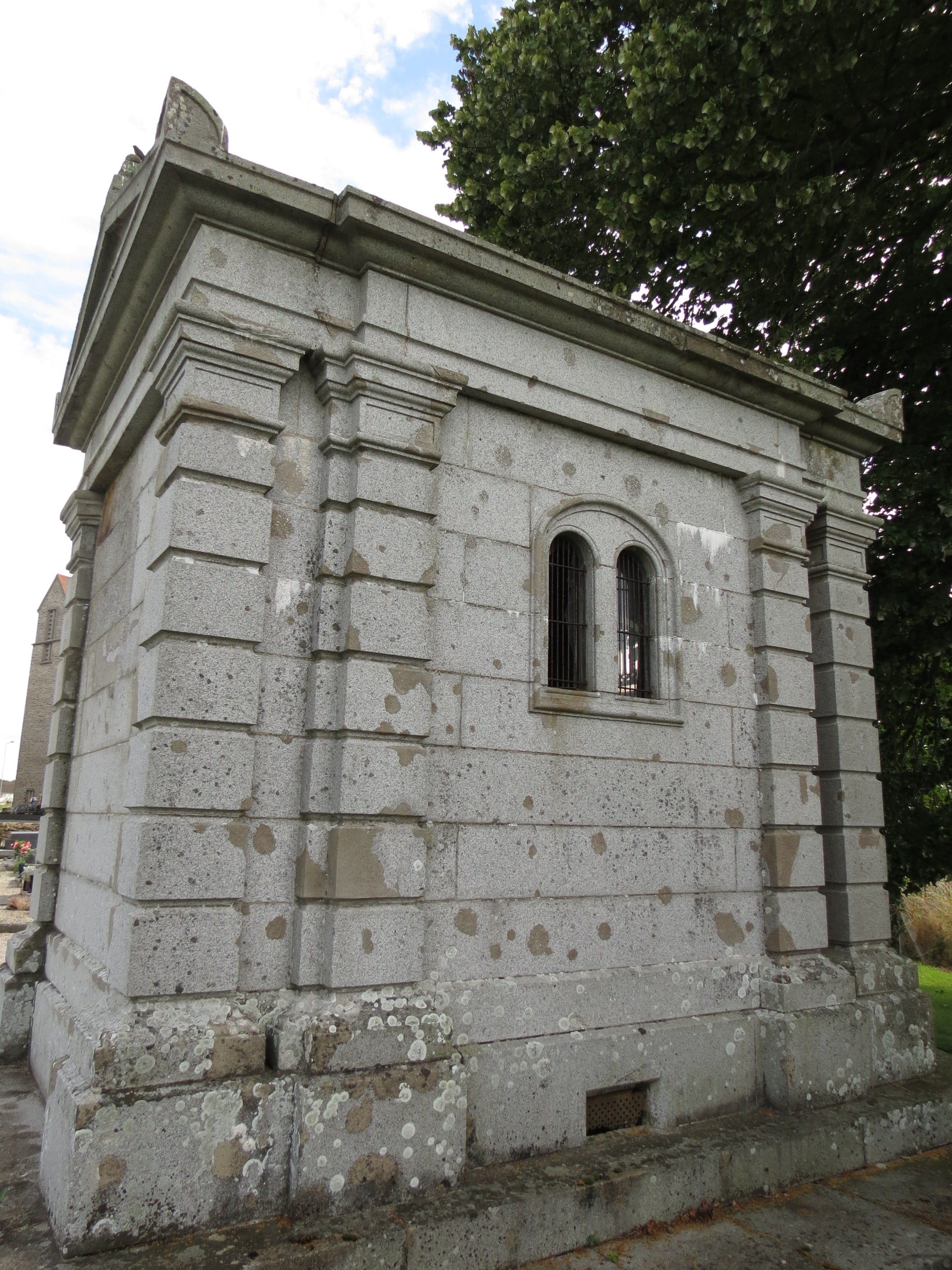
Funeral chapel, with bullet and shrapnel holes.

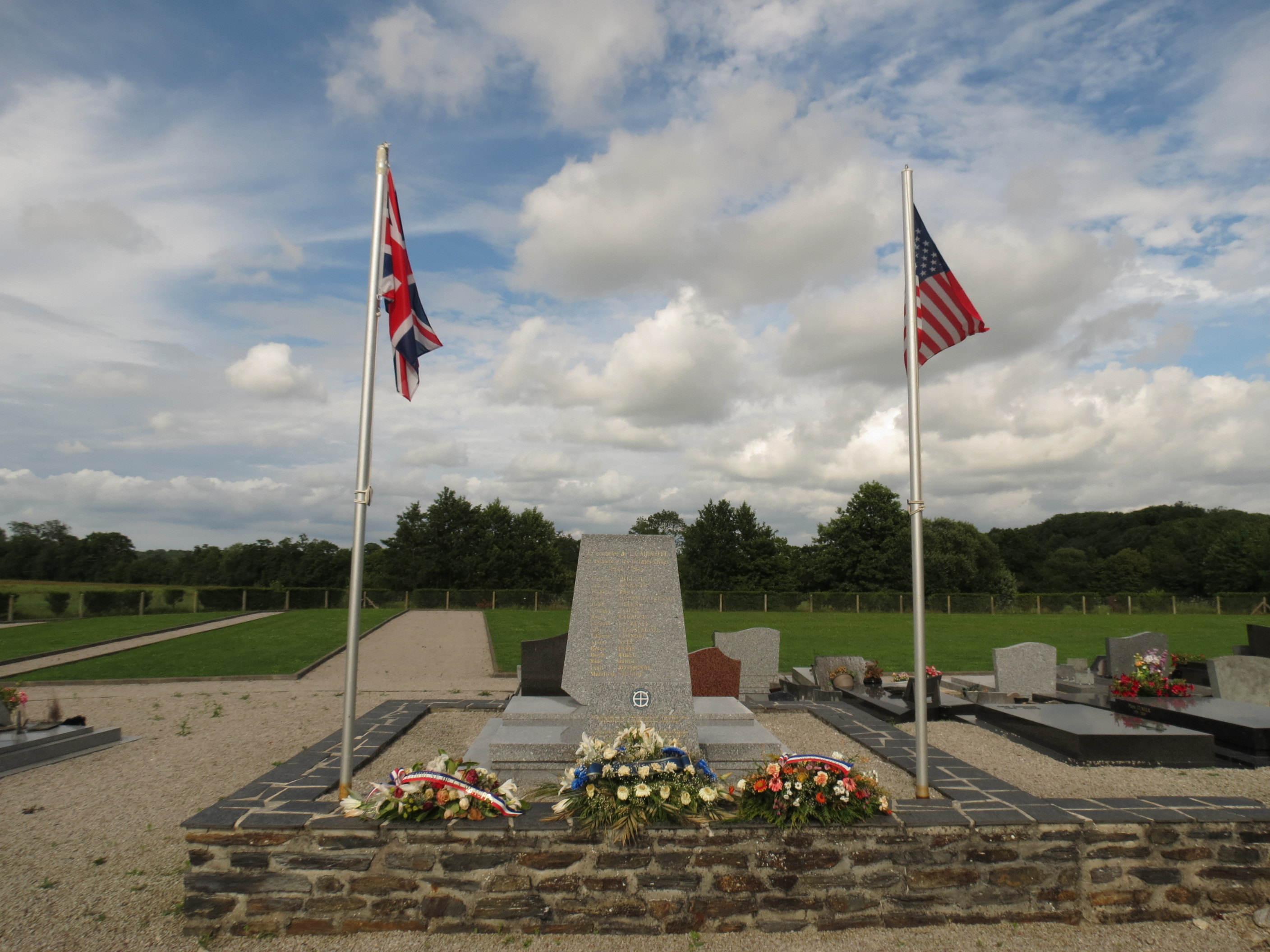
Stone memorial for the 35th ID.

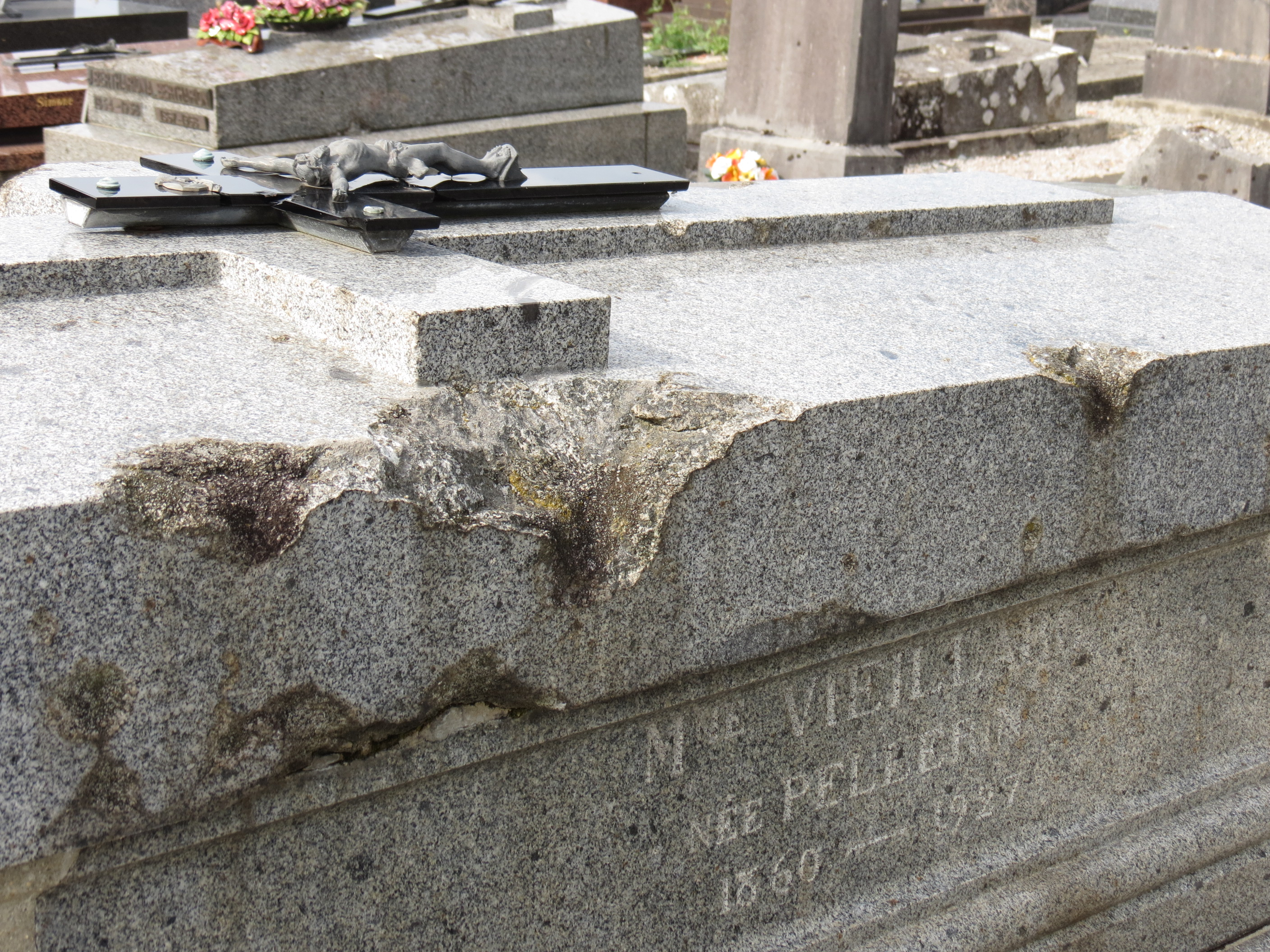
Shrapnel holes on a headstone.

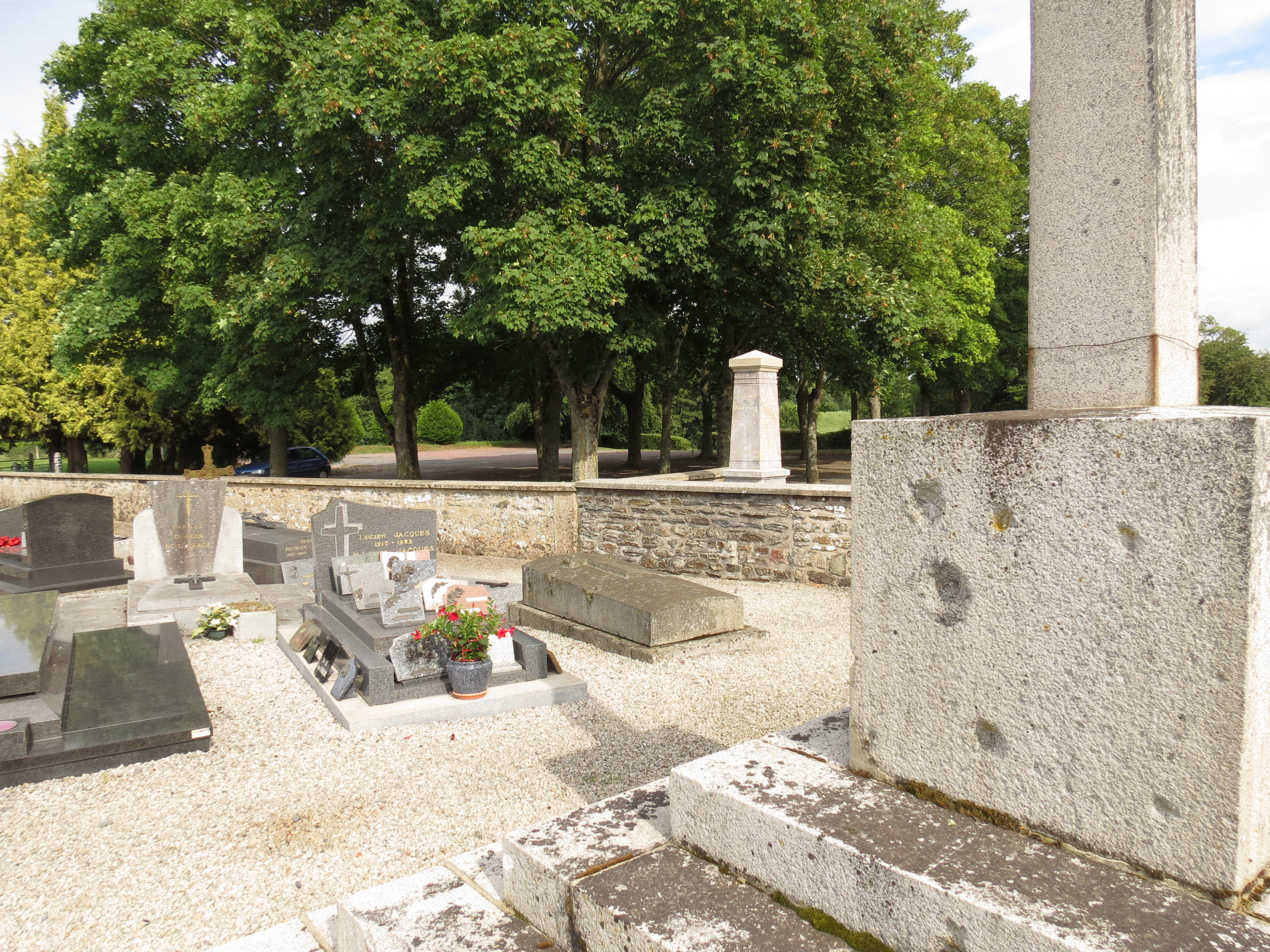
Stone of the Calvary cross, marked by the fighting.

== Heraldry ==
Arms of La Meauffe	The arms of La Meauffe are blazoned : Vert, a fess wavy argent between 2 fleurs de lys Or, and a salmon argent.

== See also ==
- Communes of the Manche department
