= Le Mesnil-Véneron =

- Commune
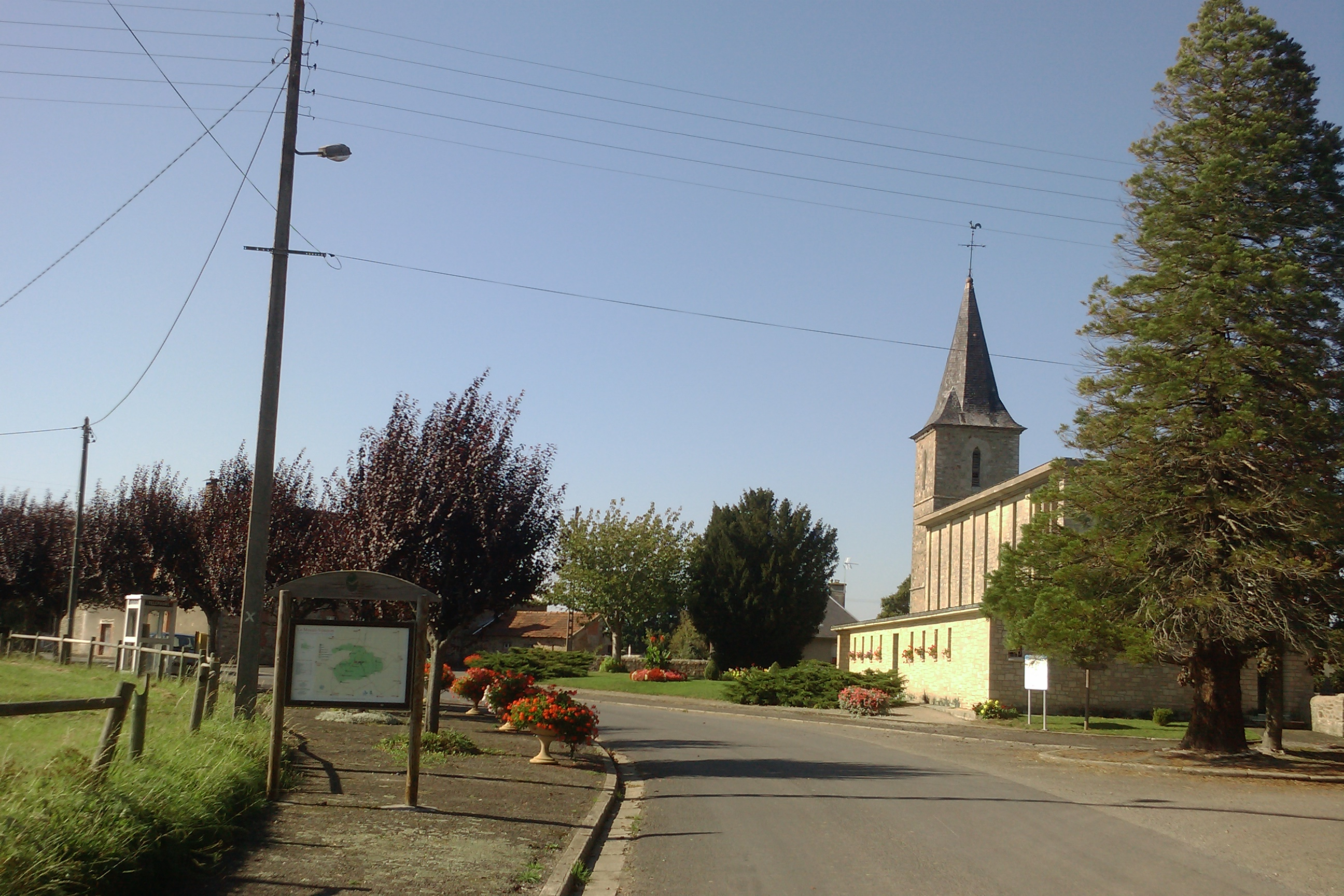
- The church and surroundings in Le Mesnil-Véneron
- Location of Le Mesnil-Véneron
- Location within France Location within Normandy
- Coordinates: 49°13′38″N 1°09′48″W
- Country: France
- Region: Normandy
- Department: Manche
- Arrondissement: Saint-Lô
- Canton: Pont-Hébert
- Intercommunality: Saint-Lô Agglo

Government
  - Mayor (2020–2026): Henri Fontaine
- Area^{1}: 2.86 km^{2} (1.10 sq mi)
- Elevation: 36 m (118 ft)
- Highest elevation: 44 m (144 ft)
- Lowest elevation: 9 m (30 ft)
- Population (2023): 107
  - Density: 37.4/km^{2} (96.9/sq mi)
- Time zone: UTC+01:00 (CET)
  - Summer (DST): UTC+02:00 (CEST)
- INSEE/Postal code: 50324 /50620
- ^{1} French Land Register data, which excludes lakes, ponds, glaciers > 1 km^{2} (0.386 sq mi or 247 acres) and river estuaries.

Le Mesnil-Véneron (French pronunciation: [lə menil venʁɔ̃]) is a commune in the Manche department in Normandy in north-western France.

== See also ==
- Communes of the Manche department
