= Cavigny =

- Commune
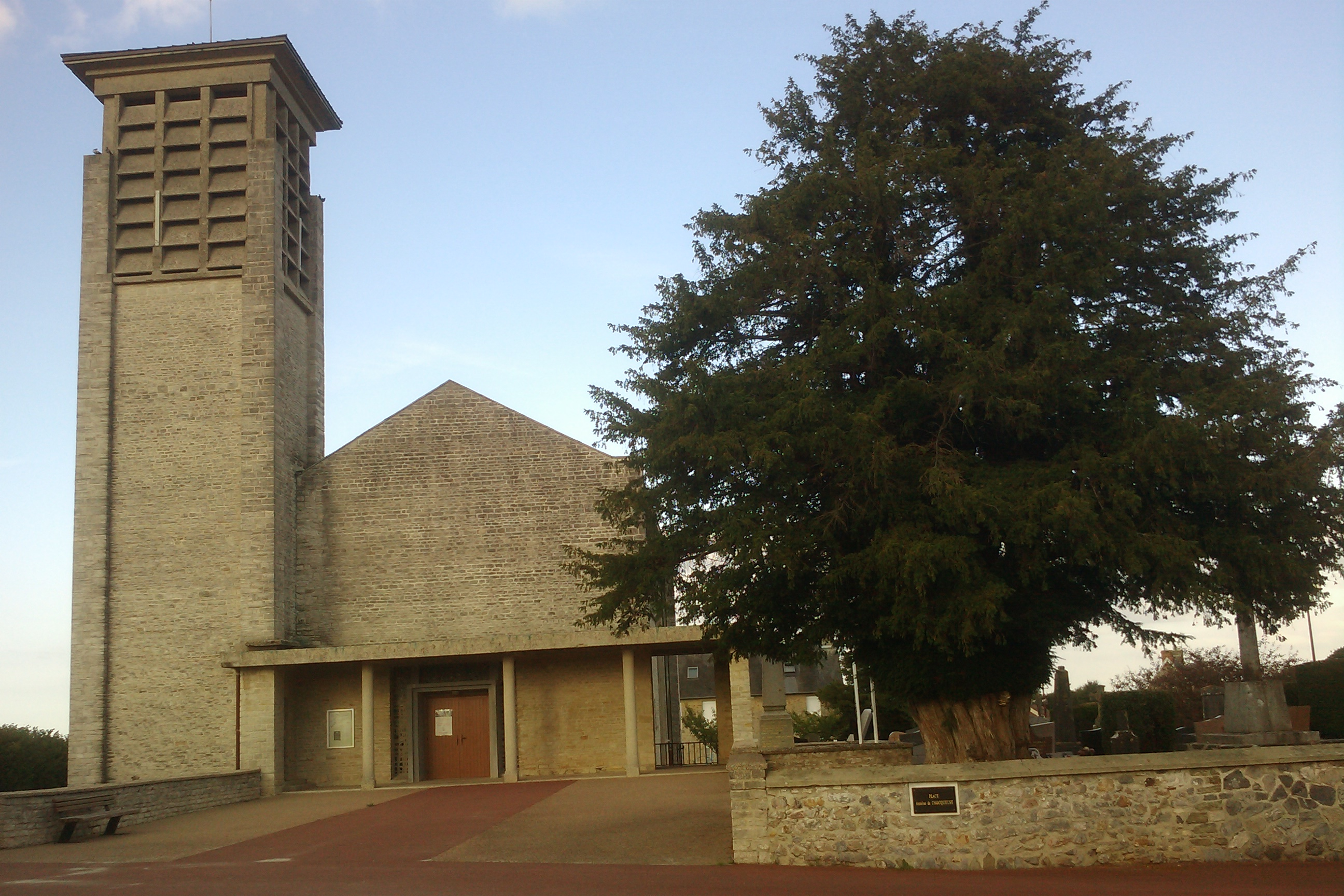
- The church in Cavigny
- Location of Cavigny
- Location within France Location within Normandy
- Coordinates: 49°11′38″N 1°06′31″W
- Country: France
- Region: Normandy
- Department: Manche
- Arrondissement: Saint-Lô
- Canton: Pont-Hébert
- Intercommunality: Saint-Lô Agglo

Government
  - Mayor (2020–2026): Eric Follain
- Area^{1}: 6.78 km^{2} (2.62 sq mi)
- Elevation: 34 m (112 ft)
- Highest elevation: 66 m (217 ft)
- Lowest elevation: 2 m (6.6 ft)
- Population (2023): 269
  - Density: 39.7/km^{2} (103/sq mi)
- Time zone: UTC+01:00 (CET)
  - Summer (DST): UTC+02:00 (CEST)
- INSEE/Postal code: 50106 /50620
- ^{1} French Land Register data, which excludes lakes, ponds, glaciers > 1 km^{2} (0.386 sq mi or 247 acres) and river estuaries.

Cavigny (French pronunciation: [kaviɲi]) is a commune in the Manche department in Normandy in north-western France.

== See also ==
- Communes of the Manche department
