= Saint-André-de-l'Épine =

- Commune
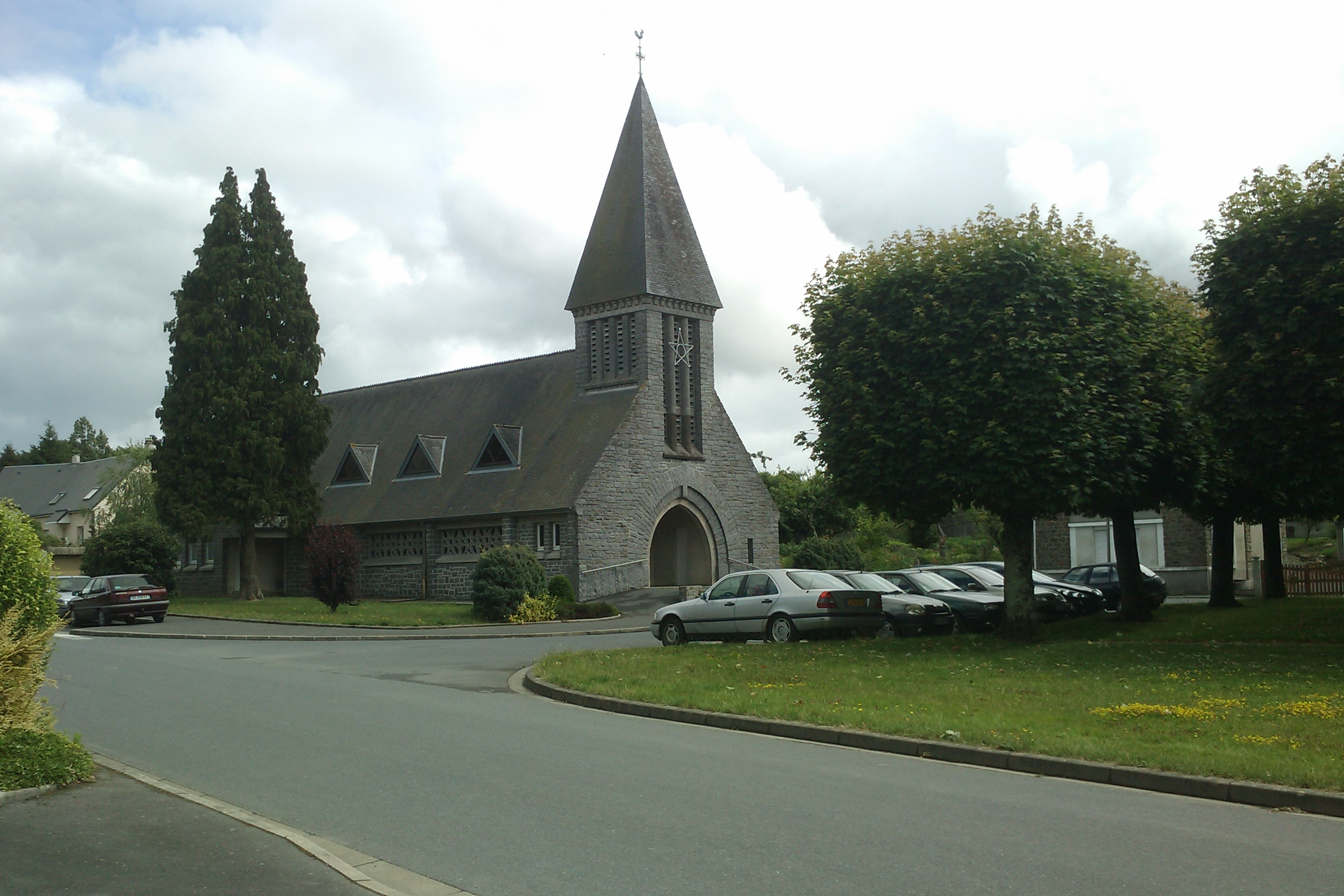
- The church in Saint-André-de-l'Épine
- Location of Saint-André-de-l'Épine
- Location within France Location within Normandy
- Coordinates: 49°08′24″N 1°00′34″W
- Country: France
- Region: Normandy
- Department: Manche
- Arrondissement: Saint-Lô
- Canton: Pont-Hébert
- Intercommunality: Saint-Lô Agglo

Government
  - Mayor (2020–2026): Gaëtan Salagnac
- Area^{1}: 7.24 km^{2} (2.80 sq mi)
- Elevation: 130 m (430 ft)
- Highest elevation: 171 m (561 ft)
- Lowest elevation: 64 m (210 ft)
- Population (2023): 555
  - Density: 76.7/km^{2} (199/sq mi)
- Time zone: UTC+01:00 (CET)
  - Summer (DST): UTC+02:00 (CEST)
- INSEE/Postal code: 50446 /50680
- ^{1} French Land Register data, which excludes lakes, ponds, glaciers > 1 km^{2} (0.386 sq mi or 247 acres) and river estuaries.

Saint-André-de-l'Épine (French pronunciation: [sɛ̃.t‿ɑ̃dʁe də lepin]) is a commune in the Manche department in Normandy in north-western France.

== See also ==
- Communes of the Manche department
