= Saint-Pierre-de-Semilly =

- Commune
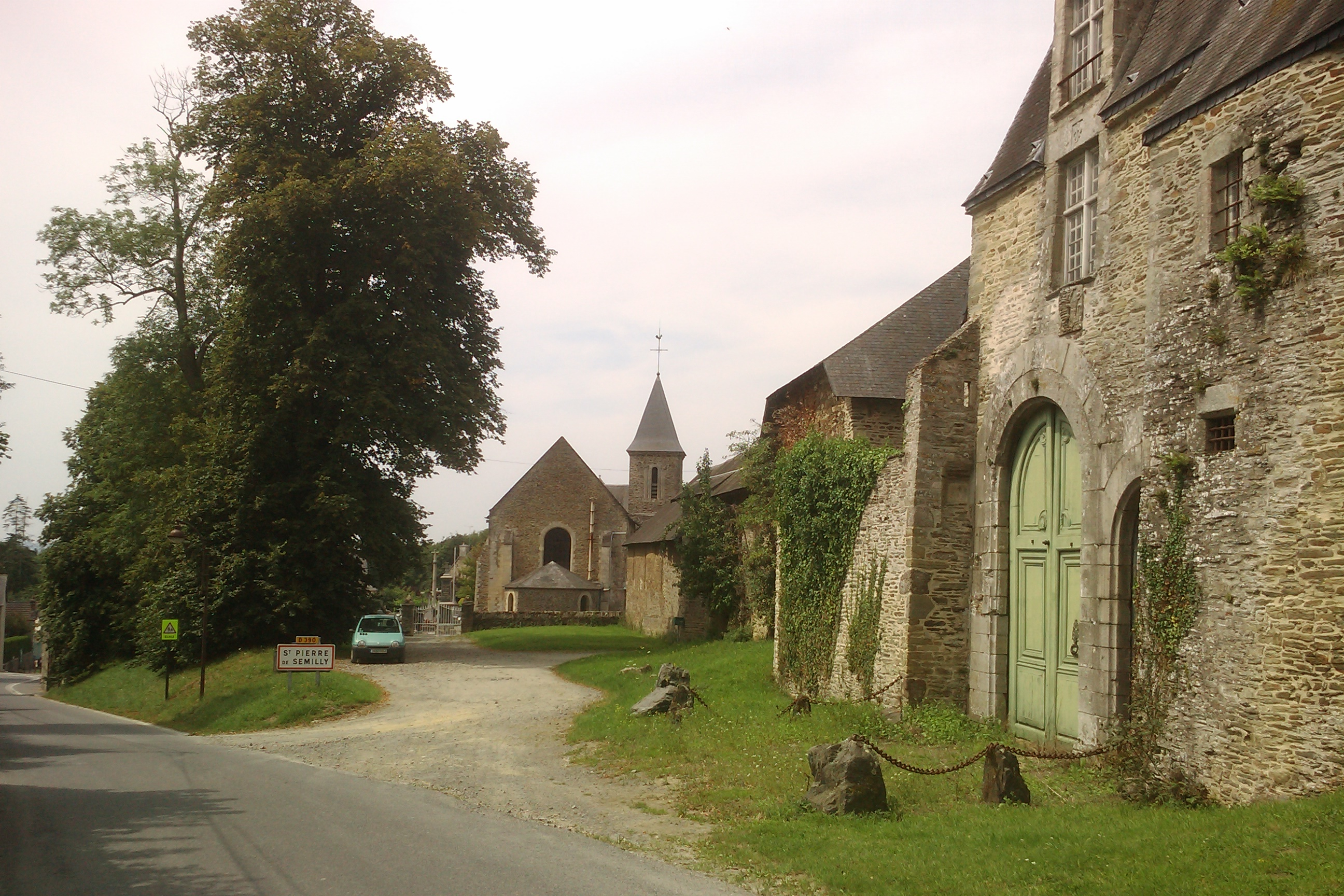
- Entrance of the commune
- Location of Saint-Pierre-de-Semilly
- Location within France Location within Normandy
- Coordinates: 49°07′15″N 1°00′16″W
- Country: France
- Region: Normandy
- Department: Manche
- Arrondissement: Saint-Lô
- Canton: Pont-Hébert
- Intercommunality: Saint-Lô Agglo

Government
  - Mayor (2020–2026): Jean-Claude Braud
- Area^{1}: 4.59 km^{2} (1.77 sq mi)
- Elevation: 130 m (430 ft)
- Highest elevation: 174 m (571 ft)
- Lowest elevation: 78 m (256 ft)
- Population (2023): 421
  - Density: 91.7/km^{2} (238/sq mi)
- Time zone: UTC+01:00 (CET)
  - Summer (DST): UTC+02:00 (CEST)
- INSEE/Postal code: 50538 /50810
- ^{1} French Land Register data, which excludes lakes, ponds, glaciers > 1 km^{2} (0.386 sq mi or 247 acres) and river estuaries.

Saint-Pierre-de-Semilly (French pronunciation: [sɛ̃ pjɛʁ də səmiji]) is a commune in the Manche department in Normandy in north-western France.

== See also ==
- Communes of the Manche department
