= La Luzerne =

- Commune
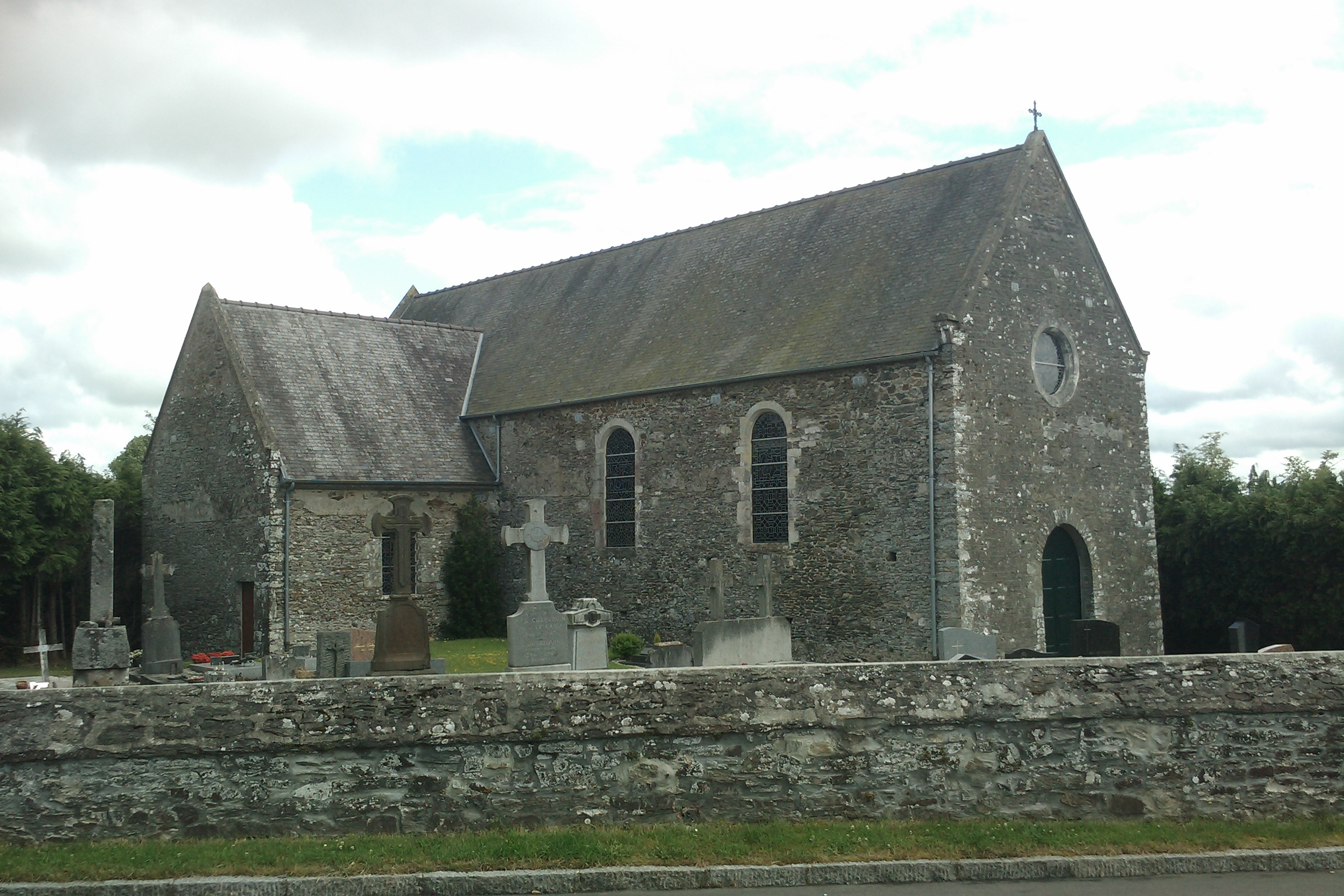
- The church of Saint-Pierre
- Location of La Luzerne
- Location within France Location within Normandy
- Coordinates: 49°08′22″N 1°02′57″W
- Country: France
- Region: Normandy
- Department: Manche
- Arrondissement: Saint-Lô
- Canton: Saint-Lô-2
- Intercommunality: Saint-Lô Agglo

Government
  - Mayor (2020–2026): Johnny Dubosq
- Area^{1}: 1.94 km^{2} (0.75 sq mi)
- Elevation: 109 m (358 ft)
- Highest elevation: 137 m (449 ft)
- Lowest elevation: 60 m (200 ft)
- Population (2023): 87
  - Density: 45/km^{2} (120/sq mi)
- Time zone: UTC+01:00 (CET)
  - Summer (DST): UTC+02:00 (CEST)
- INSEE/Postal code: 50283 /50680
- ^{1} French Land Register data, which excludes lakes, ponds, glaciers > 1 km^{2} (0.386 sq mi or 247 acres) and river estuaries.

La Luzerne (French pronunciation: [la lyzɛʁn]) is a commune in the Manche department in Normandy in north-western France.

== See also ==
- Communes of the Manche department
