= Rampan =

- Commune
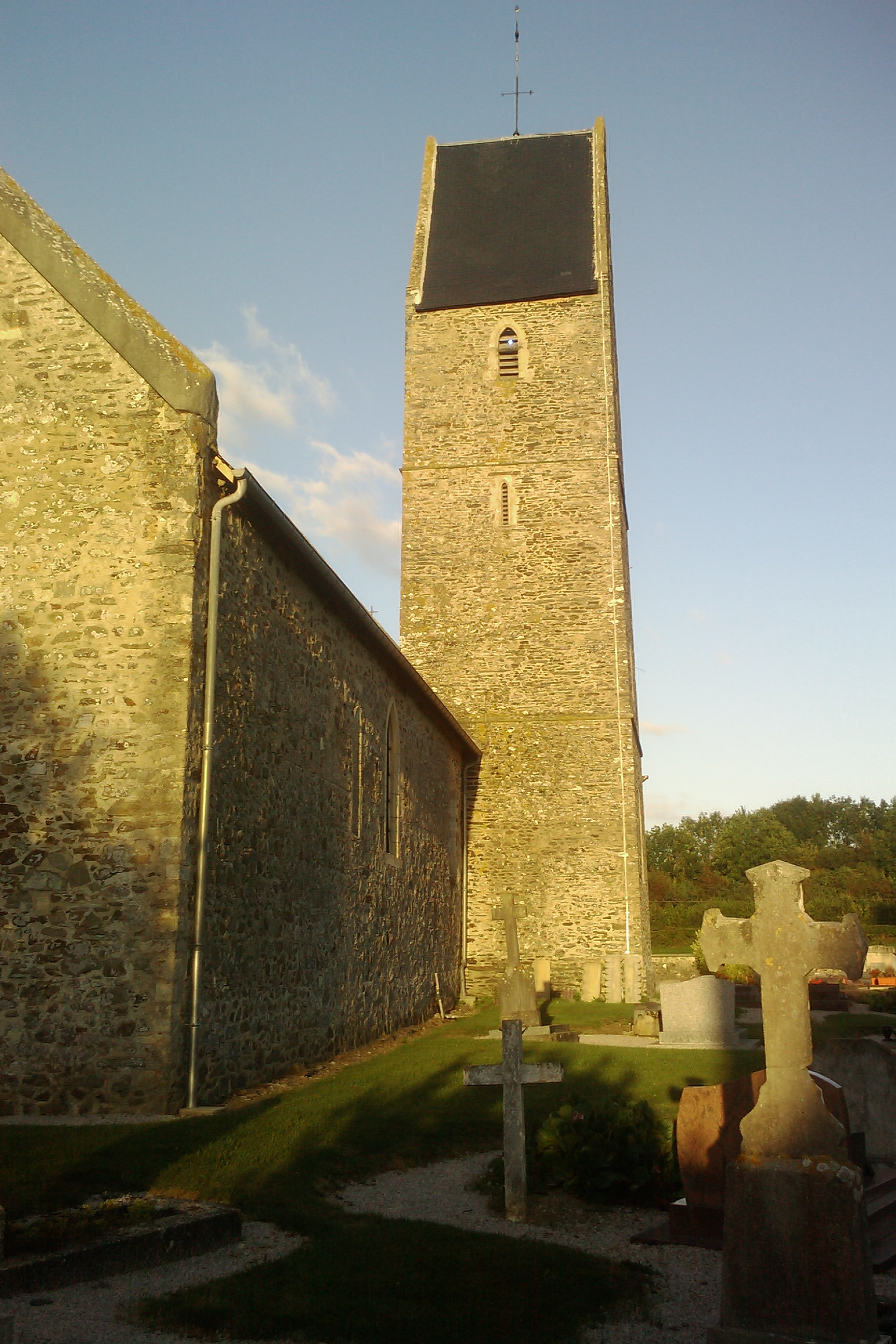
- The bell tower of the church of Notre-Dame
- Location of Rampan
- Location within France Location within Normandy
- Coordinates: 49°08′47″N 1°07′43″W
- Country: France
- Region: Normandy
- Department: Manche
- Arrondissement: Saint-Lô
- Canton: Pont-Hébert
- Intercommunality: Saint-Lô Agglo

Government
  - Mayor (2020–2026): Sylvie Le Blond
- Area^{1}: 4.09 km^{2} (1.58 sq mi)
- Elevation: 14 m (46 ft)
- Highest elevation: 78 m (256 ft)
- Lowest elevation: 7 m (23 ft)
- Population (2023): 230
  - Density: 56/km^{2} (150/sq mi)
- Demonym: Rampanais
- Time zone: UTC+01:00 (CET)
  - Summer (DST): UTC+02:00 (CEST)
- INSEE/Postal code: 50423 /50000
- ^{1} French Land Register data, which excludes lakes, ponds, glaciers > 1 km^{2} (0.386 sq mi or 247 acres) and river estuaries.

Rampan (French pronunciation: [ʁɑ̃pɑ̃]) is a commune in the Manche department in north-western France.

== See also ==
- Communes of the Manche department
