= Vay =

Vay or VAY may refer to:

== Places ==
- Vay, Loire-Atlantique, a commune in France
- South Jersey Regional Airport (FAA LID: VAY), Mount Holly, New Jersey, United States
- Vay, a village in Ka Choun commune, Veun Sai District, Cambodia

== People ==
- Adelma Vay (1840–1925), Hungarian spiritualist and medium
- Fabricio Vay (born 1986), Argentine basketball player
- Ilus Vay (1923–2008), Hungarian film and television actress
- Miklós Vay (1802–1894), Hungarian politician
- Sándor Vay (1859–1918), Hungarian poet, journalist, and transgender man
- Vay Wilson (1912–1962), Australian rugby union player

== Other uses ==
- Vay (company), a German remote driving company
- Vay (video game), a 1994 role-playing video game
- Vayu language (ISO 639:vay), a Kiranti language of Nepal
- "Vay-K", a 2014 song by English-Irish musician Tara McDonald

== See also ==
- Vea (disambiguation)
- Vey (disambiguation)
