= Vey =

Vey, VEY or Veys may refer to:

== People ==
- Gary Vey, Canadian politician
- Lana Vey (born 1984), Canadian curler
- Linden Vey (born 1991), Canadian ice hockey player
- P. C. Vey, American cartoonist

== Places ==
- Le Vey, Calvados, Normandy, France; a French commune
- Les Veys, Manche, Normandy, France; a French commune
- Vey, Iran, a village
- Veys, Veys District, Bavi, Khuzestan, Iran; a city
- Veys Rural District, Veys District, Bavi, Khuzestan, Iran
- Veys District, Bavi, Khuzestan, Iran

== Other uses ==
- Vestmannaeyjar Airport (IATA airport code: VEY; ICAO airport code: BIVM) Iceland

== See also ==
- Oy vey, a Yiddish phrase
- McVey (surname)
- Vay (disambiguation)
- Vea (disambiguation)
