= Vea (disambiguation) =

Vea is a former Puerto Rican celebrity gossip magazine form 1968 until 2009.

Vea or VEA may also refer to:

== People ==
- Alfredo Véa Jr. (born 1950), a Mexican-Yaqui-Filipino-American lawyer and novelist
- Atelea Vea, an Australian-Tongan professional rugby league footballer
- Carmen Valle Vea (born 1979), a Mexican politician
- Dominic Vea (born 1981), an Australian professional cruiser/heavyweight boxer
- Erik Vea (born 1951), a Norwegian speedskater
- Ketil Vea (1932–2015), a Norwegian composer and pedagogue
- Taione Vea (born 1988), a former Tonga rugby union player
- Vita Vea (born 1995), an American football defensive tackle
- Wilford Vea (born 1992), a Tongan weightlifter
- Jay Washington, (born Anthony Jay Washington Vea, 1981), a Filipino-American professional basketball player

== Other ==
- Veteran's Entitlement Act, an Australian law in Veterans' Review Board
- Virtual Education Academy, in CyberExtension
- Plaza Vea, the largest chain of supermarkets and hypermarket from Supermercados Peruanos S.A in Peru
- Diario VEA, a daily newspaper in Venezuela
- Volvo Engine Architecture, an engine family made by Volvo Cars
- Vlaams Energieagentschap, the Flemish Energy Agency

== See also ==
- Vay (disambiguation)
- Vey (disambiguation)
