= McVea =

McVea is a surname. Notable people with the surname include:

- Jack McVea (1914–2000), American musician
- Sandy McVea (died 1923), Australian boxer and actor
- Tennant McVea (born 1988), Northern Irish footballer
- Warren McVea (1946–2025), American football player
- Sam McVea (1884–1921), Hall of Fame heavyweight boxer

== See also ==
- McVay
- McVeigh
- McVey
