= Carmen Valle =

Carmen Valle may refer to:

- Blanca Subercaseaux de Valdés (c. 1885 –1965), Chilean writer known by the pen name Carmen Valle
- Carmen Valle Vea (born 1979), Mexican politician
