= Pellerin =

Pellerin is a name of French origin. The name may refer to:

== People with the surname ==
- Camille Pellerin-Forget, Canadian politician from Quebec
- Fleur Pellerin (born 1973), French politician
- Giles Pellerin (1906–1998), American college football fan; notable for having attended 797 consecutive USC football games over a period of 73 years
- Guy Pellerin (born 1971), Canadian hockey referee
- Jean Pellerin, Canadian politician from Quebec
- Joseph Pellerin (1684–1782), French Intendant-General of the Navy, first Commissioner of the Navy
- Krystin Pellerin (born 1983), Canadian stage and film actress
- Scott Pellerin (born 1970), Canadian ice hockey player

== Places ==
- Le Pellerin, France
- Saint-Pellerin, Eure-et-Loir, France
- Saint-Pellerin, Manche, France
