= Saint-Pellerin =

Saint-Pellerin may refer to the following places in France:

- Saint-Pellerin, Eure-et-Loir, a commune in the Eure-et-Loir department
- Saint-Pellerin, Manche, a commune in the Manche department
