= Veys (disambiguation) =

Veys may refer to:

== People ==
- Marie Elisabeth Veys (born in 1981), Belgian judoka

== Places ==
=== France ===
- Les Veys, old commune in Normandy

=== Iran ===
- Veys District, district of Khuzestan Province
- Veys, capital of Veys District
