= Carentan-les-Marais =

- Commune
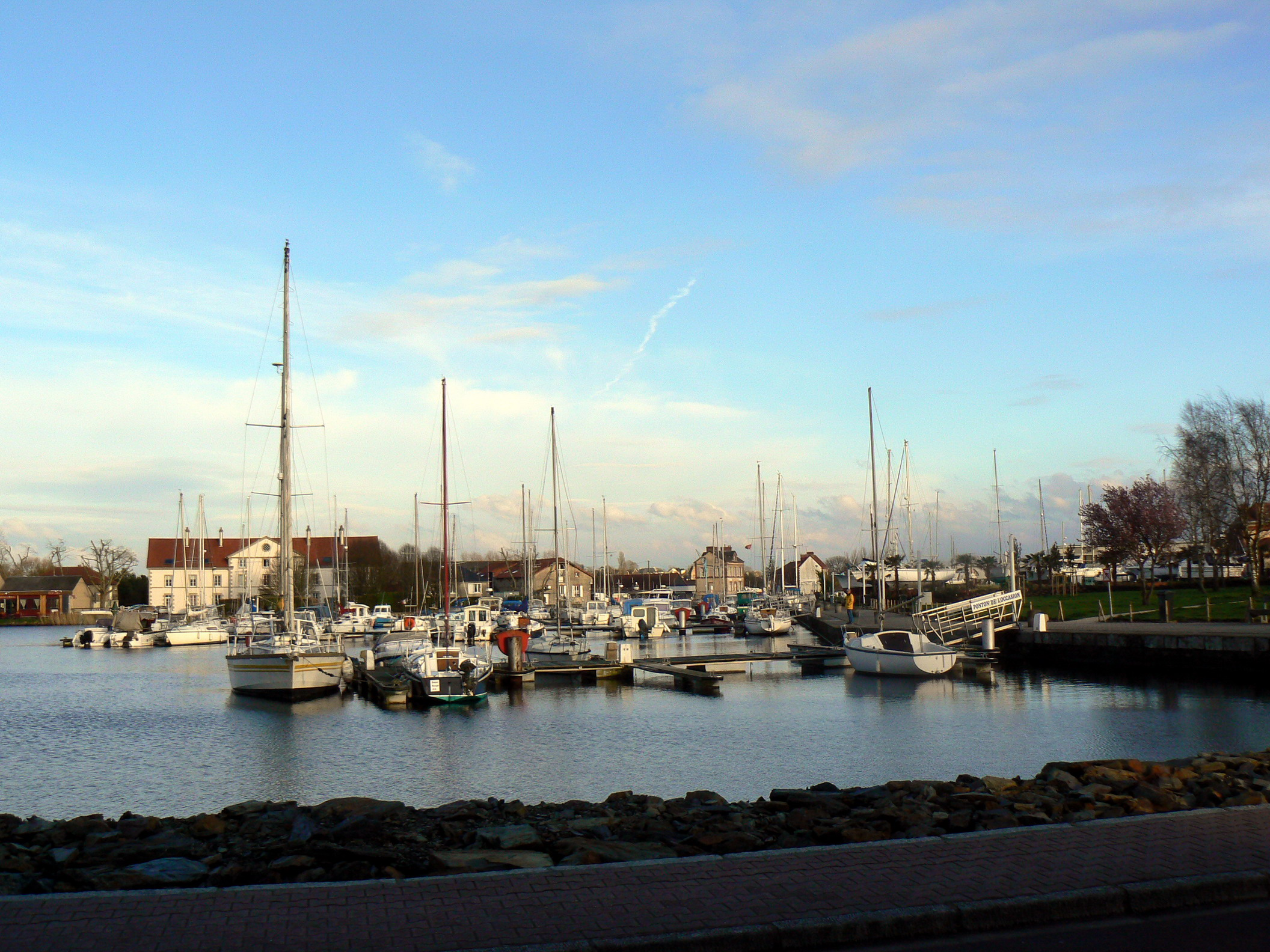
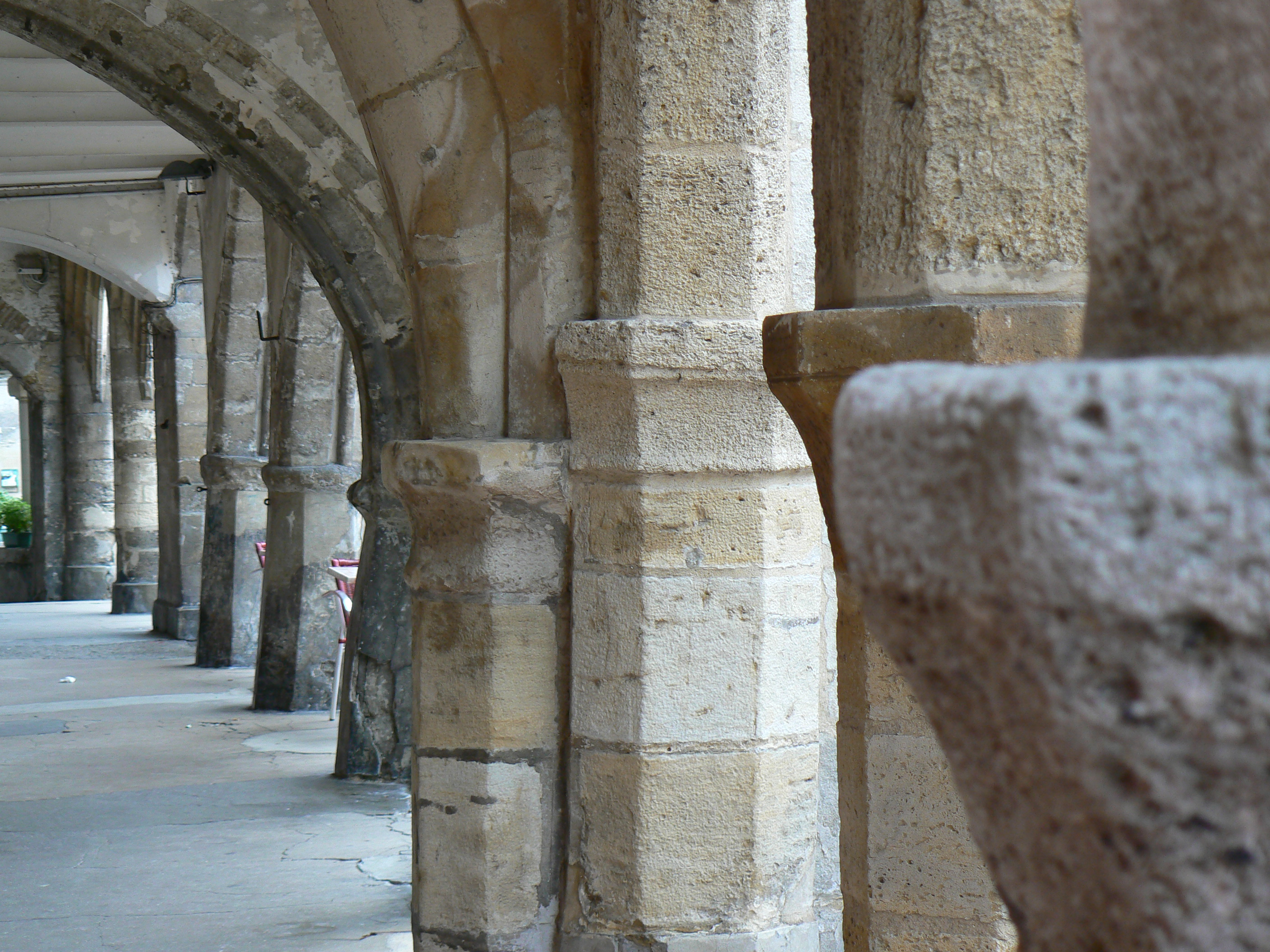
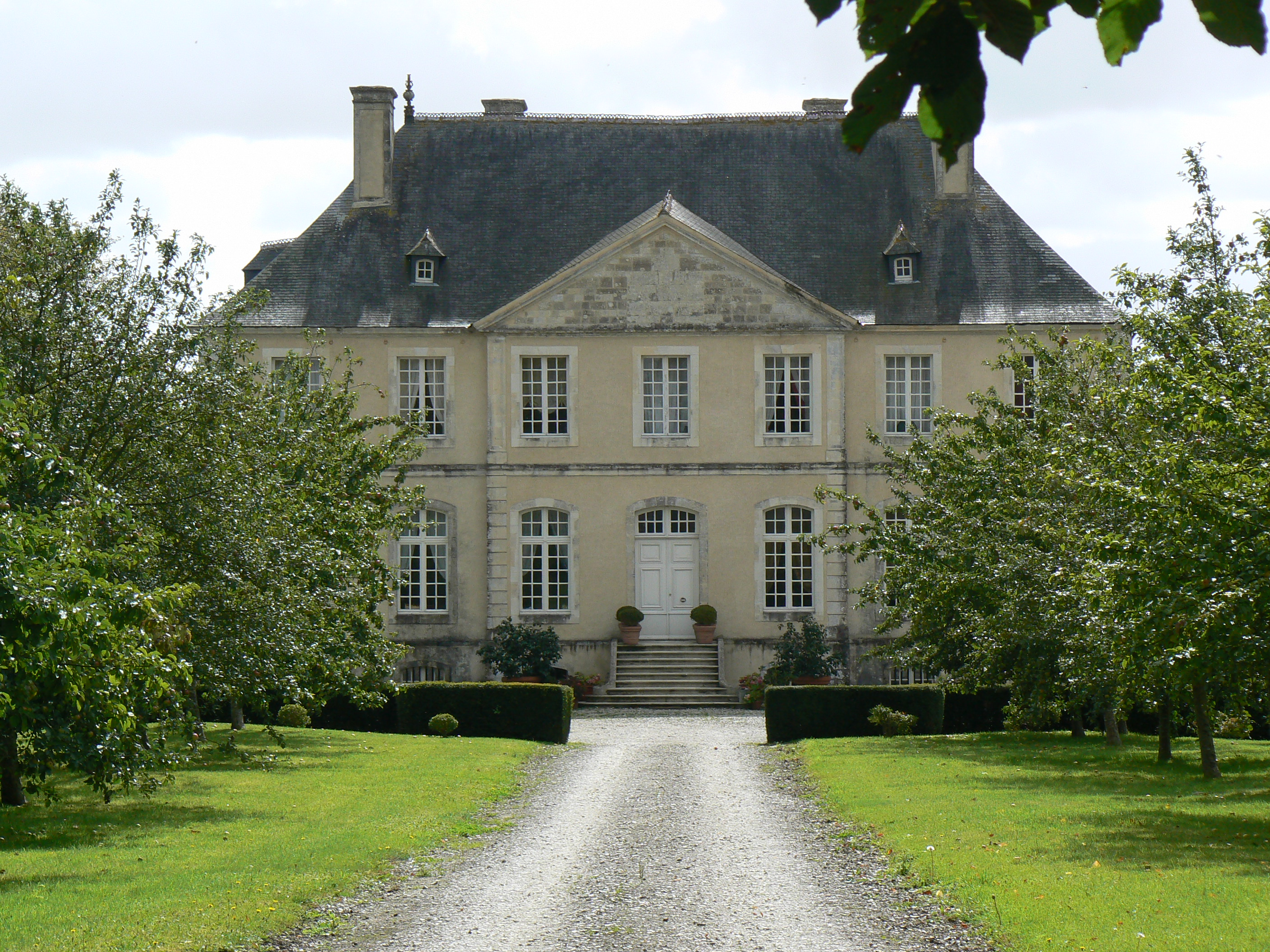
- Main: Carentan harbour; bottom (l-r): Carentan's Arcades, Castle of Vierville
- Location of Carentan-les-Marais
- Location within France Location within Normandy
- Coordinates: 49°18′14″N 1°14′49″W
- Country: France
- Region: Normandy
- Department: Manche
- Arrondissement: Saint-Lô
- Canton: Carentan-les-Marais and Pont-Hébert
- Intercommunality: CC Baie du Cotentin

Government
  - Mayor (2020–2026): Jean-Pierre Lhonneur
- Area^{1}: 133.29 km^{2} (51.46 sq mi)
- Highest elevation: 38 m (125 ft)
- Lowest elevation: 0 m (0 ft)
- Population (2023): 10,218
  - Density: 76.660/km^{2} (198.55/sq mi)
- Time zone: UTC+01:00 (CET)
  - Summer (DST): UTC+02:00 (CEST)
- INSEE/Postal code: 50099 /50500
- ^{1} French Land Register data, which excludes lakes, ponds, glaciers > 1 km^{2} (0.386 sq mi or 247 acres) and river estuaries.

Carentan-les-Marais (French pronunciation: [kaʁɑ̃tɑ̃ le maʁɛ]) is a commune in the department of Manche, northwestern France.

== Geography ==
Carentan-les-Marais is located in the middle of vast marsh remediated and transformed into rich meadows, at the confluence of the Taute and the Douve. The city, at the gateway to the Cotentin Peninsula and the Bay of Veys, is at the heart of the Regional Natural Park of the Cotentin and Bessin marshes.

=== Transport ===
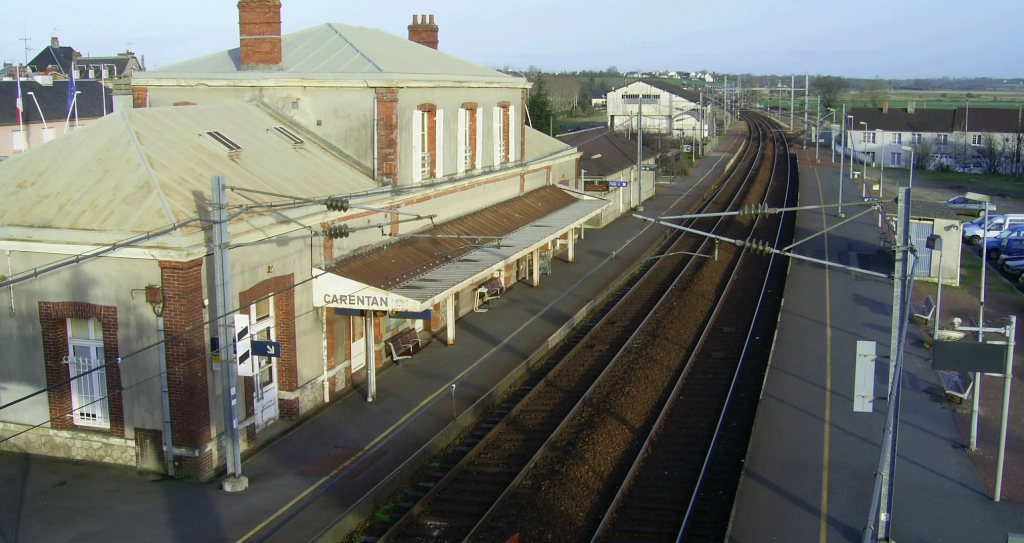
Railway station of Carentan-les-Marais

The city has a railway station on the Paris–Cherbourg line and is crossed by the RN 13 and RN 174. It is served by public transport by bus (Manéo) via the line 001 Cherbourg-Octeville - Valognes - Carentan - Saint-Lo. Its port is connected to the sea by a canal.

== Toponymy ==
The name of the commune refers to the marshes of Carentan.

== History ==
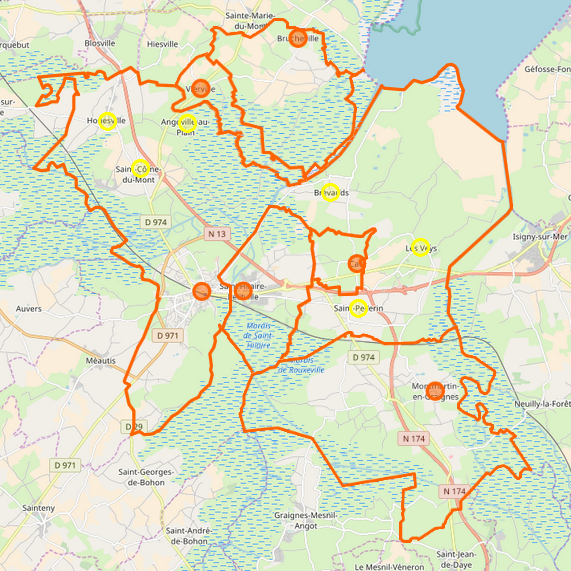
Map of the new municipality and its municipalities

The municipality was established on 1 January 2016 by merger of the former communes of Carentan (the seat), Angoville-au-Plain, Houesville, and Saint-Côme-du-Mont. On 1 January 2017 Brévands, Les Veys and Saint-Pellerin joined the commune of Carentan. On 1 January 2019 Brucheville, Catz, Montmartin-en-Graignes, Saint-Hilaire-Petitville and Vierville joined the commune of Carentan.

The communes of Carentan, Angoville-au-Plain, Houesville, Saint-Côme-du-Mont, Brévands, Les Veys, Saint-Pellerin Brucheville, Catz, Montmartin-en-Graignes, Saint-Hilaire-Petitville, and Vierville have become delegated communes.

== Population ==
Historical population
Year	Pop.	±% p.a.
1968	9,195	—
1975	9,535	+0.52%
1982	10,027	+0.72%
1990	9,999	−0.03%
1999	10,271	+0.30%
2007	10,282	+0.01%
2012	10,224	−0.11%
2017	10,118	−0.21%
2023	10,218	+0.16%
Populations of the area corresponding with the commune of Carentan-les-Marais at 1 January 2025. Source: INSEE

== Education ==
Level	Public establishments	Private establishments
School	Les Hauts Champs Public Primary School; Les Roseaux Public Primary School	Notre Dame Private School Primary School
College	Léon Gambetta College	Notre Dame College
High school	Lycée Sivard de Beaulieu	Institution Notre-Dame - Professional High School

== Sport ==
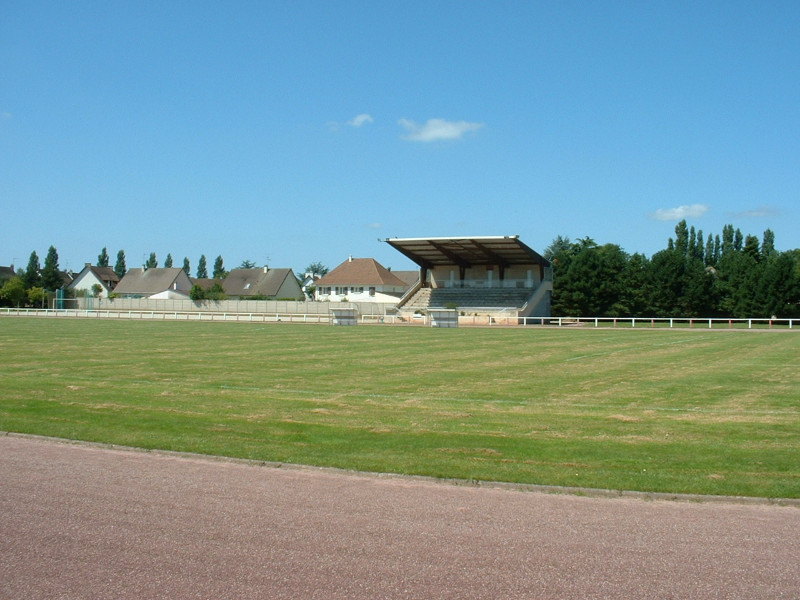
stade Alphonse Laurent

== Administration ==
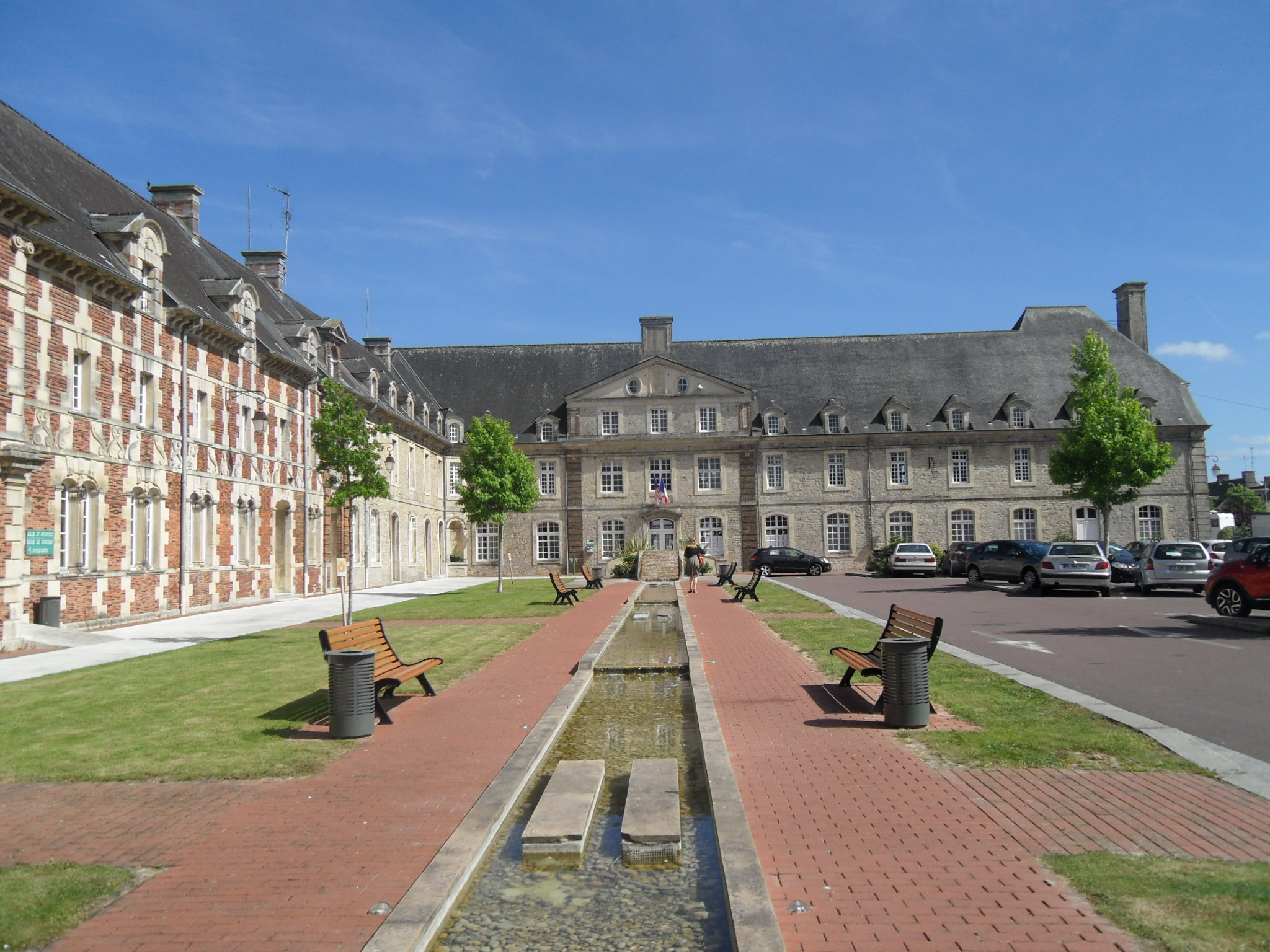
Town hall of Carentan-les-Marais

Election	Mayor	Party	Occupation
2016	Jean-Pierre Lhonneur	LR	Research and Development Manager, Delegate mayor of Carentan

== Twinned towns ==
- Selby, United Kingdom
- Waldfischbach-Burgalben, Germany

== See also ==
- Communes of the Manche department
