= Montmartin-en-Graignes =

- Part of Carentan-les-Marais
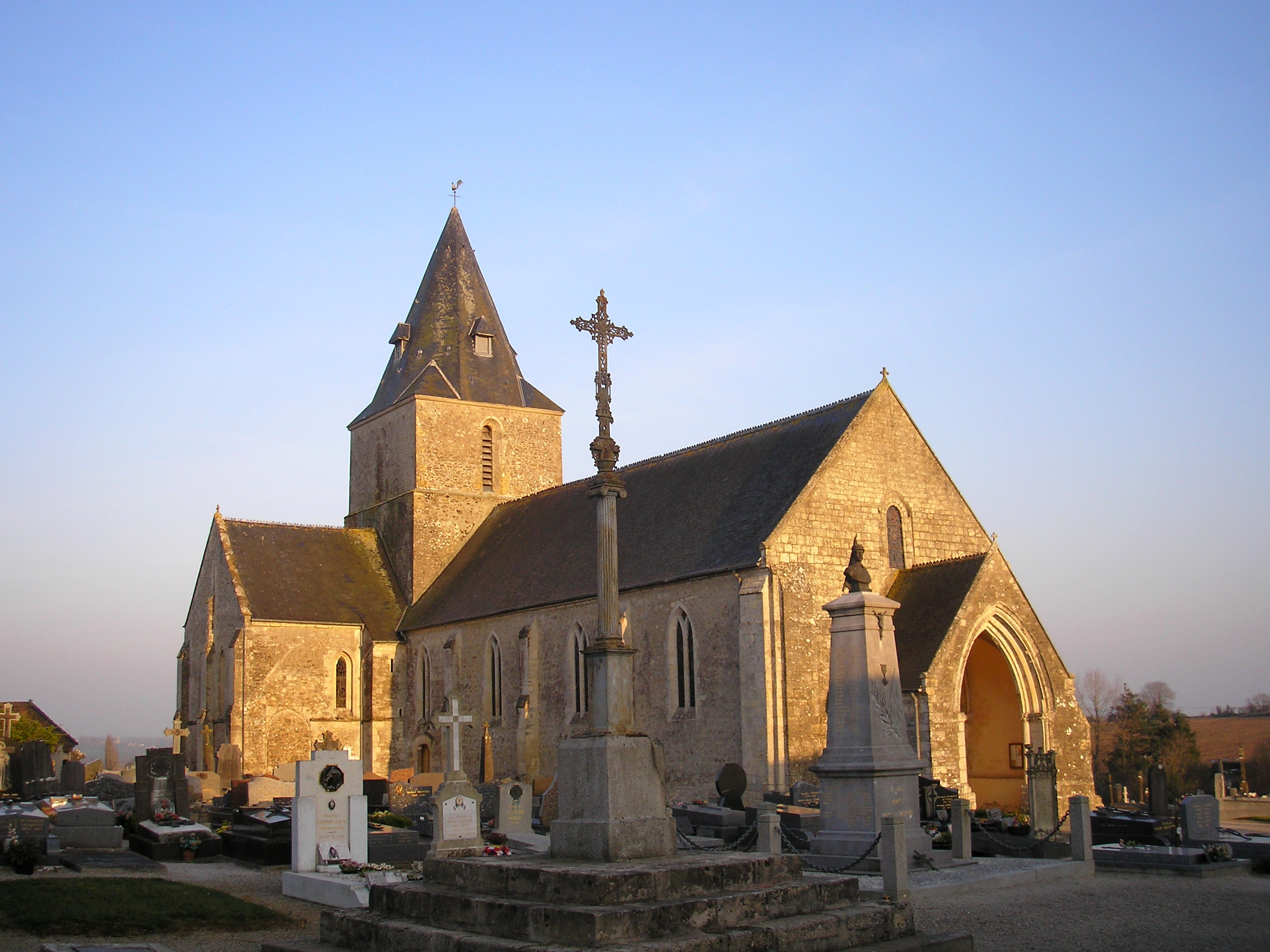
- The church in Montmartin-en-Graignes
- Location of Montmartin-en-Graignes
- Location within France Location within Normandy
- Coordinates: 49°16′34″N 1°08′43″W
- Country: France
- Region: Normandy
- Department: Manche
- Arrondissement: Saint-Lô
- Canton: Pont-Hébert
- Commune: Carentan-les-Marais
- Area^{1}: 30.34 km^{2} (11.71 sq mi)
- Elevation: 32 m (105 ft)
- Highest elevation: 38 m (125 ft)
- Lowest elevation: 0 m (0 ft)
- Population (2022): 607
  - Density: 20.0/km^{2} (51.8/sq mi)
- Demonym: Montmartinais
- Time zone: UTC+01:00 (CET)
  - Summer (DST): UTC+02:00 (CEST)
- Postal code: 50620
- ^{1} French Land Register data, which excludes lakes, ponds, glaciers > 1 km^{2} (0.386 sq mi or 247 acres) and river estuaries.

Montmartin-en-Graignes (French pronunciation: [mɔ̃maʁtɛ̃ ɑ̃ ɡʁɛɲ]) is a former commune in the Manche department in Normandy in north-western France. On 1 January 2019, it was merged into the commune Carentan-les-Marais.

== See also ==
- Communes of the Manche department
