= Houesville =

- Part of Carentan-les-Marais
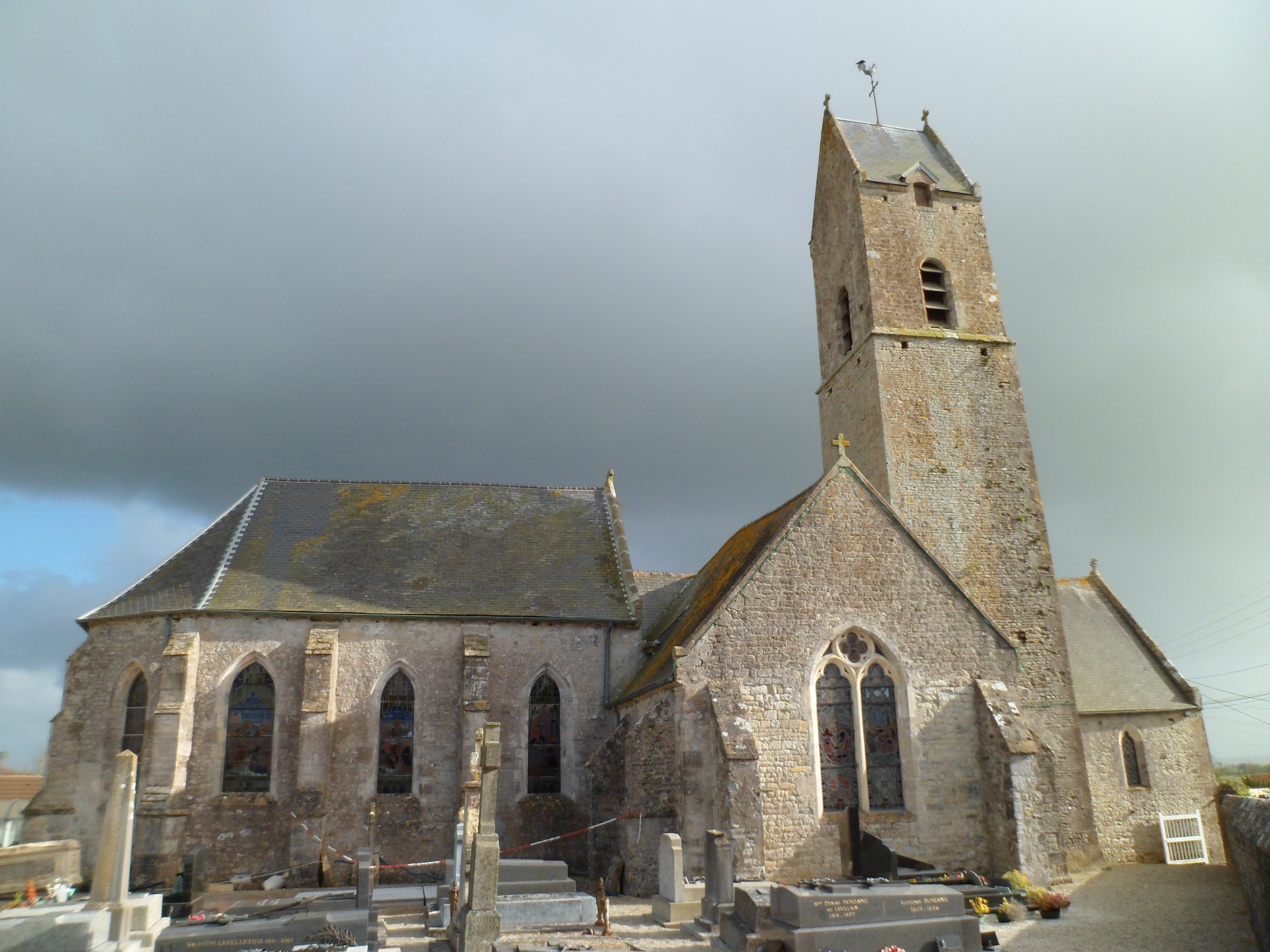
- The church of Saint-Gilles

- Flag Coat of arms
- Location of Houesville
- Location within France Location within Normandy
- Coordinates: 49°21′06″N 1°17′11″W
- Country: France
- Region: Normandy
- Department: Manche
- Arrondissement: Saint-Lô
- Canton: Carentan
- Commune: Carentan-les-Marais
- Area^{1}: 5.38 km^{2} (2.08 sq mi)
- Elevation: 5 m (16 ft)
- Highest elevation: 26 m (85 ft)
- Lowest elevation: 2 m (6.6 ft)
- Population (2022): 246
  - Density: 45.7/km^{2} (118/sq mi)
- Time zone: UTC+01:00 (CET)
  - Summer (DST): UTC+02:00 (CEST)
- Postal code: 50480
- ^{1} French Land Register data, which excludes lakes, ponds, glaciers > 1 km^{2} (0.386 sq mi or 247 acres) and river estuaries.

Houesville (French pronunciation: [wɛvil]) is a former commune in the Manche department in north-western France. On 1 January 2016, it was merged into the new commune of Carentan-les-Marais.

== Heraldry ==
Arms of Houesville	The arms of Houesville are blazoned : Azure, 3 apples slipped and leaved Or, on a chief gules, 2 leopards respectant Or, armed and langued azure.

== See also ==
- Communes of the Manche department
