= Saint-Côme-du-Mont =

- Part of Carentan-les-Marais
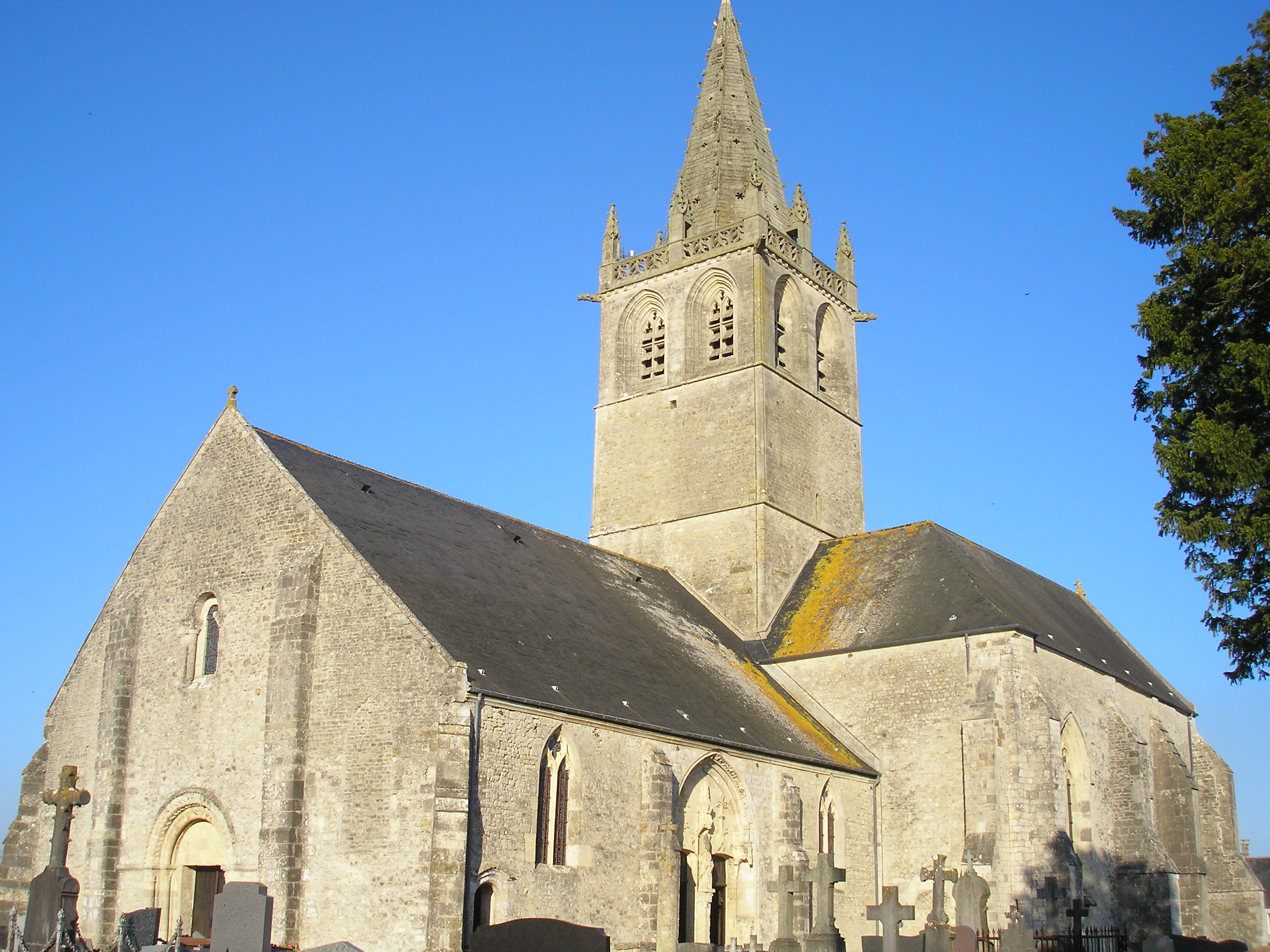
- The church of Saint-Côme-et-Saint-Damien
- Location of Saint-Côme-du-Mont
- Location within France Location within Normandy
- Coordinates: 49°20′12″N 1°16′16″W
- Country: France
- Region: Normandy
- Department: Manche
- Arrondissement: Saint-Lô
- Canton: Carentan
- Commune: Carentan-les-Marais
- Area^{1}: 12.91 km^{2} (4.98 sq mi)
- Elevation: 4 m (13 ft)
- Highest elevation: 32 m (105 ft)
- Lowest elevation: 0 m (0 ft)
- Population (2022): 460
  - Density: 36/km^{2} (92/sq mi)
- Time zone: UTC+01:00 (CET)
  - Summer (DST): UTC+02:00 (CEST)
- Postal code: 50500
- ^{1} French Land Register data, which excludes lakes, ponds, glaciers > 1 km^{2} (0.386 sq mi or 247 acres) and river estuaries.

Saint-Côme-du-Mont (French pronunciation: [sɛ̃ kom dy mɔ̃]) is a former commune in the Manche department in Normandy in north-western France. On 1 January 2016, it was merged into the new commune of Carentan-les-Marais.

== Gallery ==
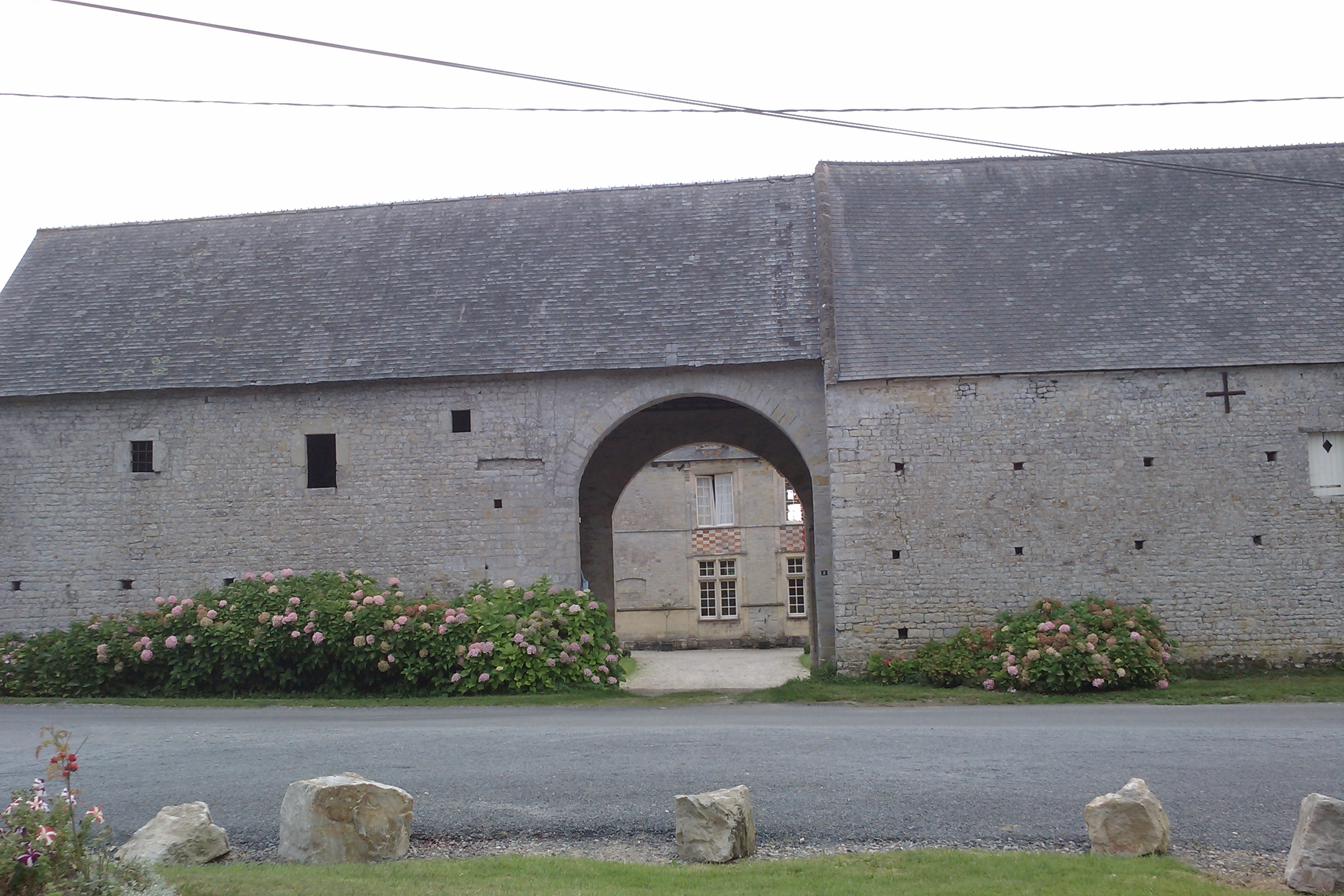
Manoir de Haubourg

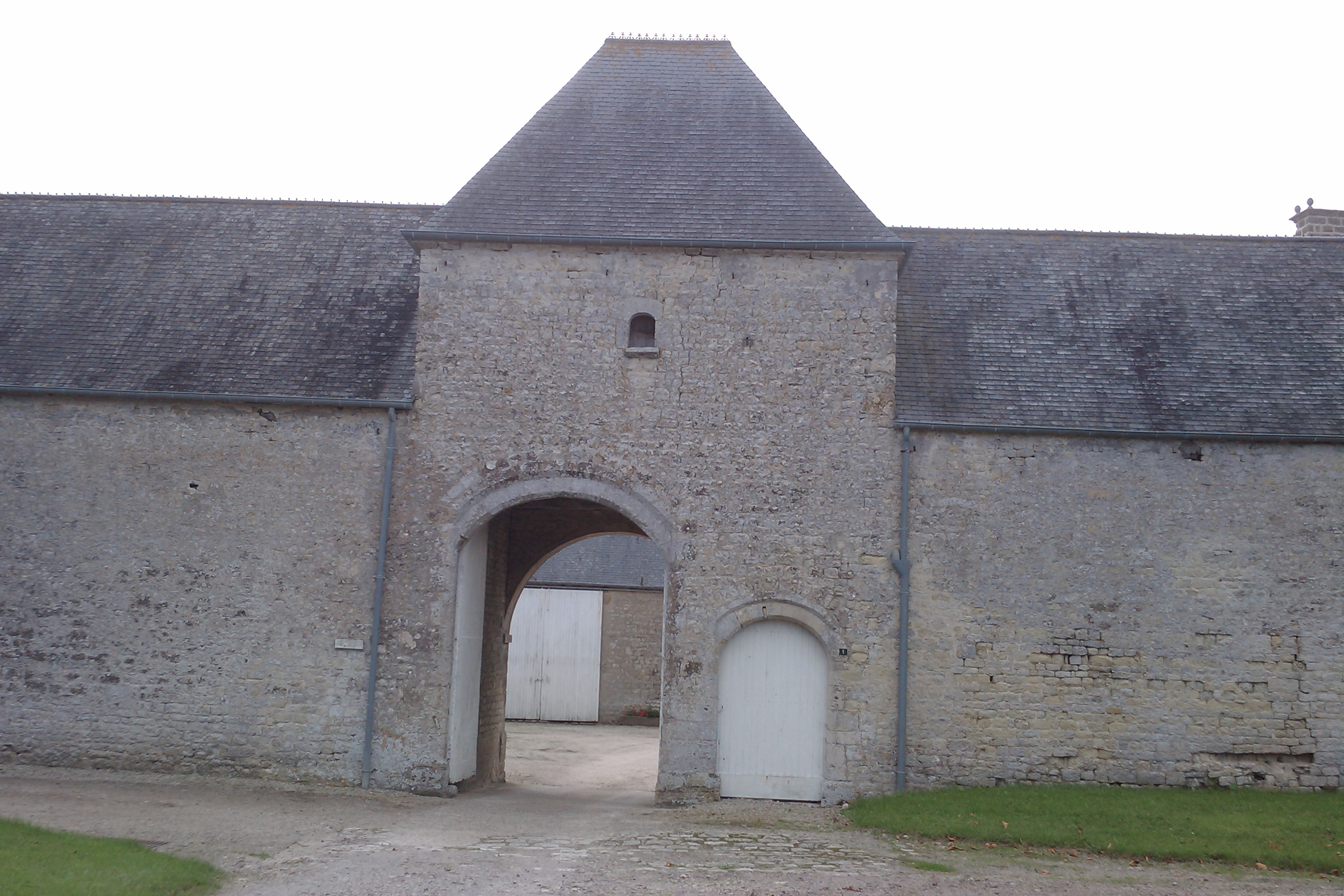
The Manoir de Rampan

== See also ==
- Communes of the Manche department
- Brothers in Arms: Road to Hill 30, video game based on the true story of the 502nd Parachute Infantry Regiment of the famed 101st Airborne Division
