= Brévands =

- Part of Carentan-les-Marais
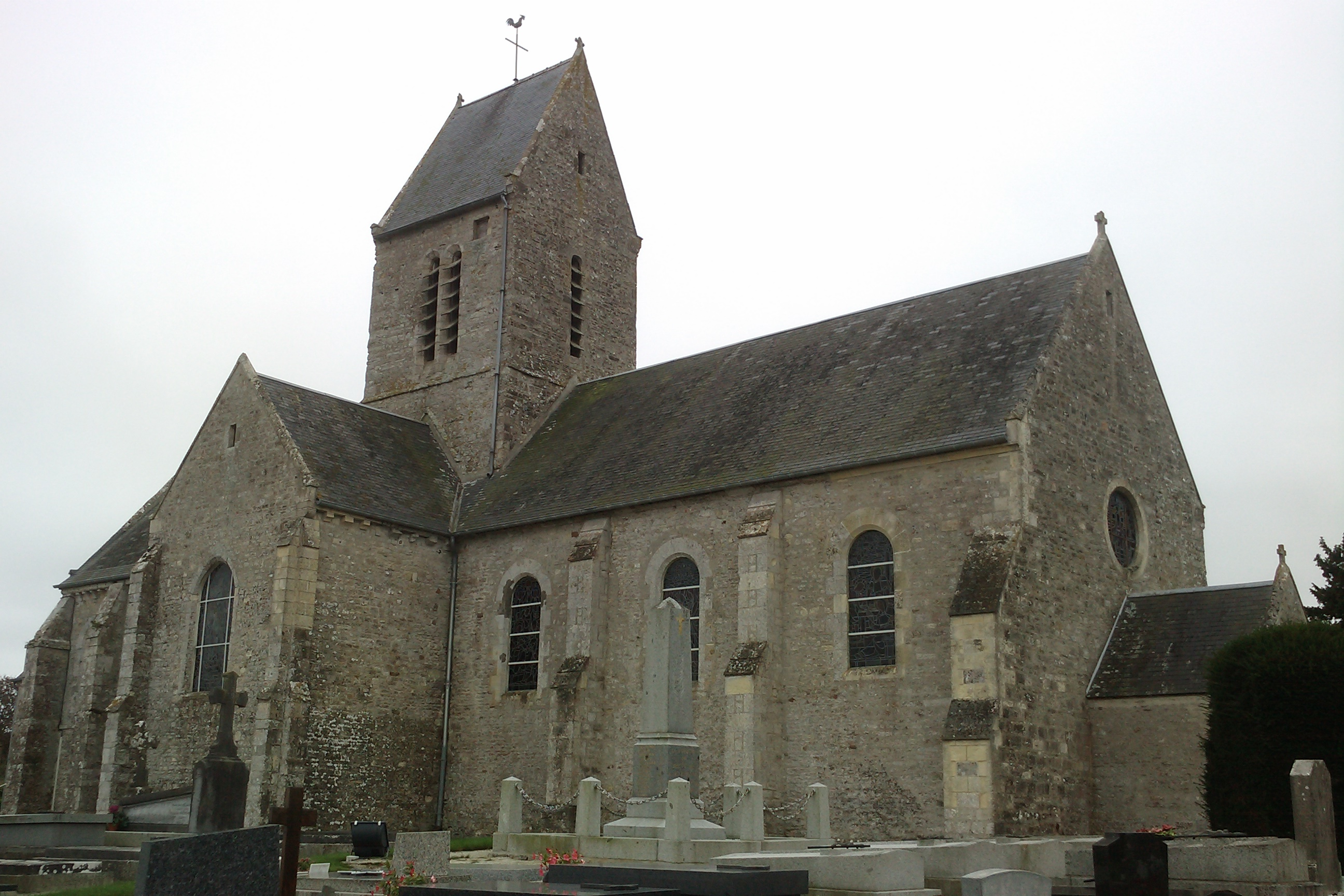
- The church of Saint-Martin
- Location of Brévands
- Location within France Location within Normandy
- Coordinates: 49°19′57″N 1°10′56″W
- Country: France
- Region: Normandy
- Department: Manche
- Arrondissement: Saint-Lô
- Canton: Carentan
- Commune: Carentan-les-Marais
- Area^{1}: 13.87 km^{2} (5.36 sq mi)
- Highest elevation: 29 m (95 ft)
- Lowest elevation: 0 m (0 ft)
- Population (2023): 301
  - Density: 21.7/km^{2} (56.2/sq mi)
- Time zone: UTC+01:00 (CET)
  - Summer (DST): UTC+02:00 (CEST)
- Postal code: 50500
- ^{1} French Land Register data, which excludes lakes, ponds, glaciers > 1 km^{2} (0.386 sq mi or 247 acres) and river estuaries.

Brévands (French pronunciation: [bʁevɑ̃]) is a former commune in the Manche department in Normandy in northwestern France. On 1 January 2017, it was merged into the commune Carentan-les-Marais.

== See also ==
- Communes of the Manche department
