= McVey =

McVey is an Irish surname originating in the province of Connacht. It's more common in Ulster today. Notable people with the surname include:

- Alanna McVey, fictional character from River City
- Alex McVey, American fine artist and illustrator
- Cal McVey (1849–1926), American professional baseball player
- Cameron McVey (born 1957), English singer-songwriter and music producer
- Daniel McVey (1892–1972), Australian public servant
- Derek McVey (born 1968), Australian rugby league player
- Dominic McVey (born 1985), British entrepreneur
- Duncan McVey (died 2010), New Zealand footballer
- Esther McVey (born 1967), British Conservative Party politician
- George McVey (1865–1896), American major-league baseball player
- Jackson McVey, American mixed martial artist
- James McVey (born 1994), member of The Vamps
- Leza McVey (1907–1984), American studio potter
- Mabel (born 1996), English singer and songwriter
- Patrick McVey (1910–1973), American actor
- Robert McVey (born 1936), American ice hockey player
- Sam McVey (1884–1921), American heavyweight boxer
- Tyler McVey (1912–2003), American actor
- Walter Lewis McVey, Jr. (1922–2014), American Congressman
- William E. McVey (1885–1958), American Congressman
- William McVey (sculptor) (1905–1995), American sculptor

== See also ==
- McVay
- McVea
- McVeigh
- Vey (disambiguation)
