= Brucheville =

- Part of Carentan-les-Marais
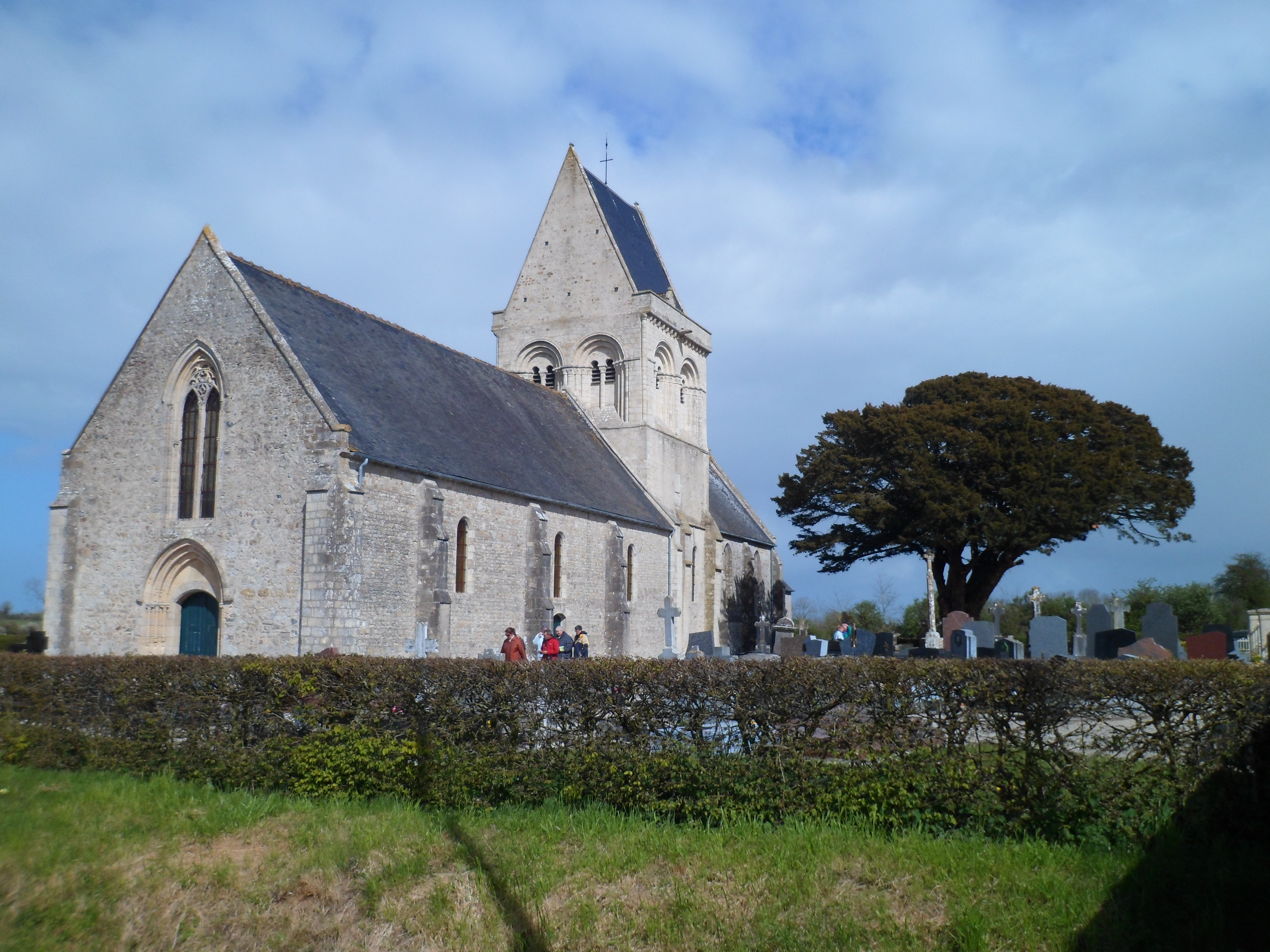
- The church of Saint-Hilaire
- Location of Brucheville
- Location within France Location within Normandy
- Coordinates: 49°22′25″N 1°12′18″W
- Country: France
- Region: Normandy
- Department: Manche
- Arrondissement: Saint-Lô
- Canton: Carentan
- Commune: Carentan-les-Marais
- Area^{1}: 13.33 km^{2} (5.15 sq mi)
- Elevation: 4 m (13 ft)
- Highest elevation: 21 m (69 ft)
- Lowest elevation: 0 m (0 ft)
- Population (2023): 111
  - Density: 8.33/km^{2} (21.6/sq mi)
- Time zone: UTC+01:00 (CET)
  - Summer (DST): UTC+02:00 (CEST)
- Postal code: 50480
- ^{1} French Land Register data, which excludes lakes, ponds, glaciers > 1 km^{2} (0.386 sq mi or 247 acres) and river estuaries.

Brucheville (French pronunciation: [bʁyʃvil]) is a former commune in the Manche department in Normandy in northwestern France. On 1 January 2019, it was merged into the commune Carentan-les-Marais. It is located at the south east corner of the Cherbourg peninsula, about 90 km east of Caen.

== World War II ==
After the liberation of the area by Allied Forces in 1944, engineers of the Ninth Air Force IX Engineering Command began construction of a combat Advanced Landing Ground outside of the town. Declared operational on 2 August, the airfield was designated as "A-16", it was used by the 36th Fighter Group which flew P-47 Thunderbolts until late August when the unit moved into Central France. Afterward, the airfield was closed.

== See also ==
- Communes of the Manche department
