= Angoville-au-Plain =

- Part of Carentan-les-Marais
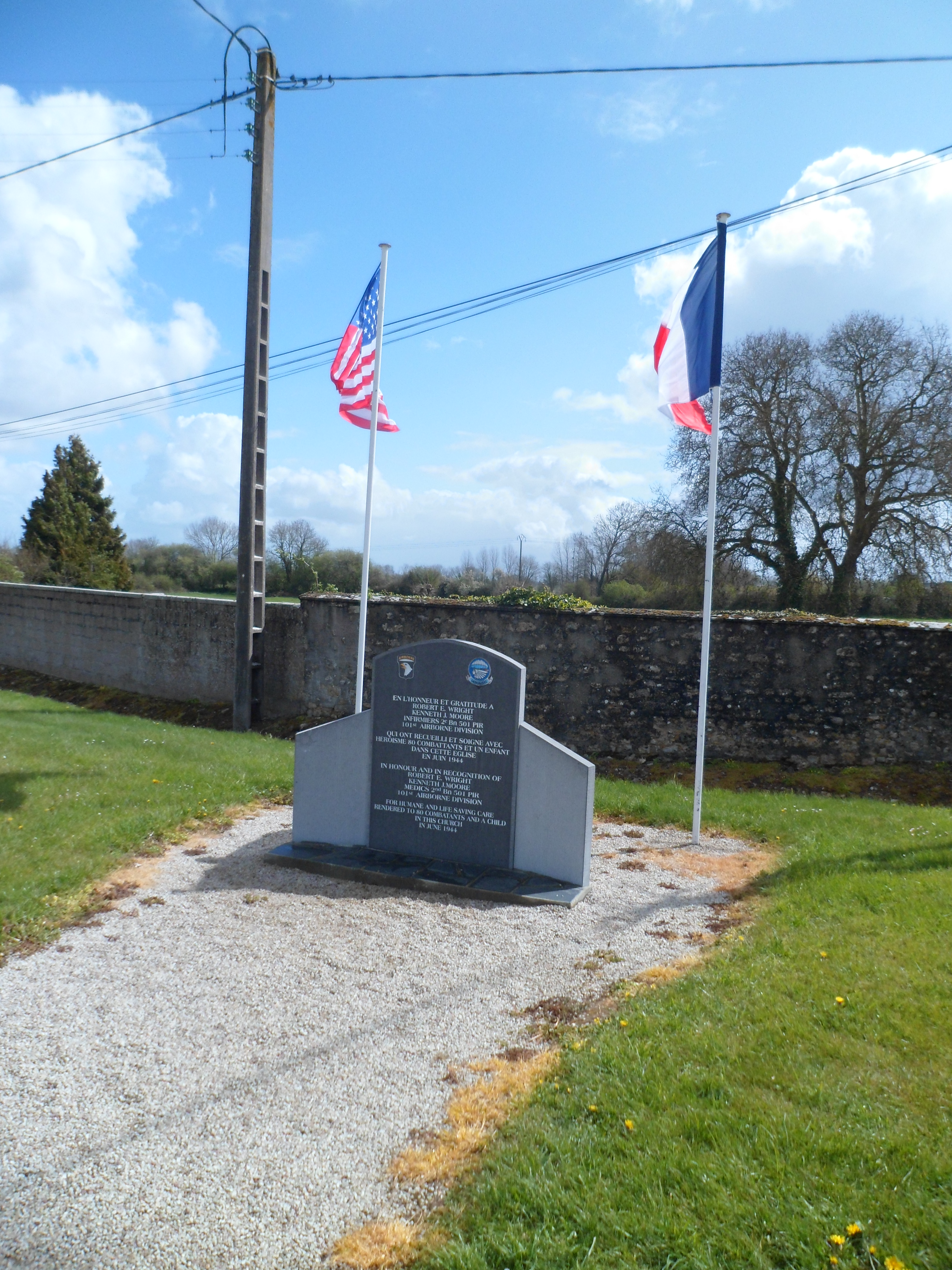
- 101st Airborne monument
- Location of Angoville-au-Plain
- Location within France Location within Normandy
- Coordinates: 49°20′57″N 1°15′10″W
- Country: France
- Region: Normandy
- Department: Manche
- Arrondissement: Saint-Lô
- Canton: Carentan
- Commune: Carentan-les-Marais
- Area^{1}: 5.68 km^{2} (2.19 sq mi)
- Elevation: 12 m (39 ft)
- Highest elevation: 32 m (105 ft)
- Lowest elevation: 2 m (6.6 ft)
- Population (2023): 102
  - Density: 18.0/km^{2} (46.5/sq mi)
- Time zone: UTC+01:00 (CET)
  - Summer (DST): UTC+02:00 (CEST)
- Postal code: 50480
- ^{1} French Land Register data, which excludes lakes, ponds, glaciers > 1 km^{2} (0.386 sq mi or 247 acres) and river estuaries.

Angoville-au-Plain (French pronunciation: [ɑ̃ɡɔvil o plɛ̃]) is a former commune in the Manche department in the Normandy region in northwestern France. On 1 January 2016, it was merged into the new commune of Carentan-les-Marais.

== History ==
Angoville-au-Plain is home to a church that was used by two United States Army medics as an aide station during the Battle of Normandy in World War II. Robert Wright and Ken Moore of the 101st Airborne Division treated 80 injured soldiers, a mix of American and German, and a child. Blood stains are still visible on the pews. Two stained glass windows commemorate the 101st Airborne Division; the first one is dedicated to the two medics of the 2nd Battalion of the 501st Parachute Infantry Regiment, and the second one honours the American parachutists.

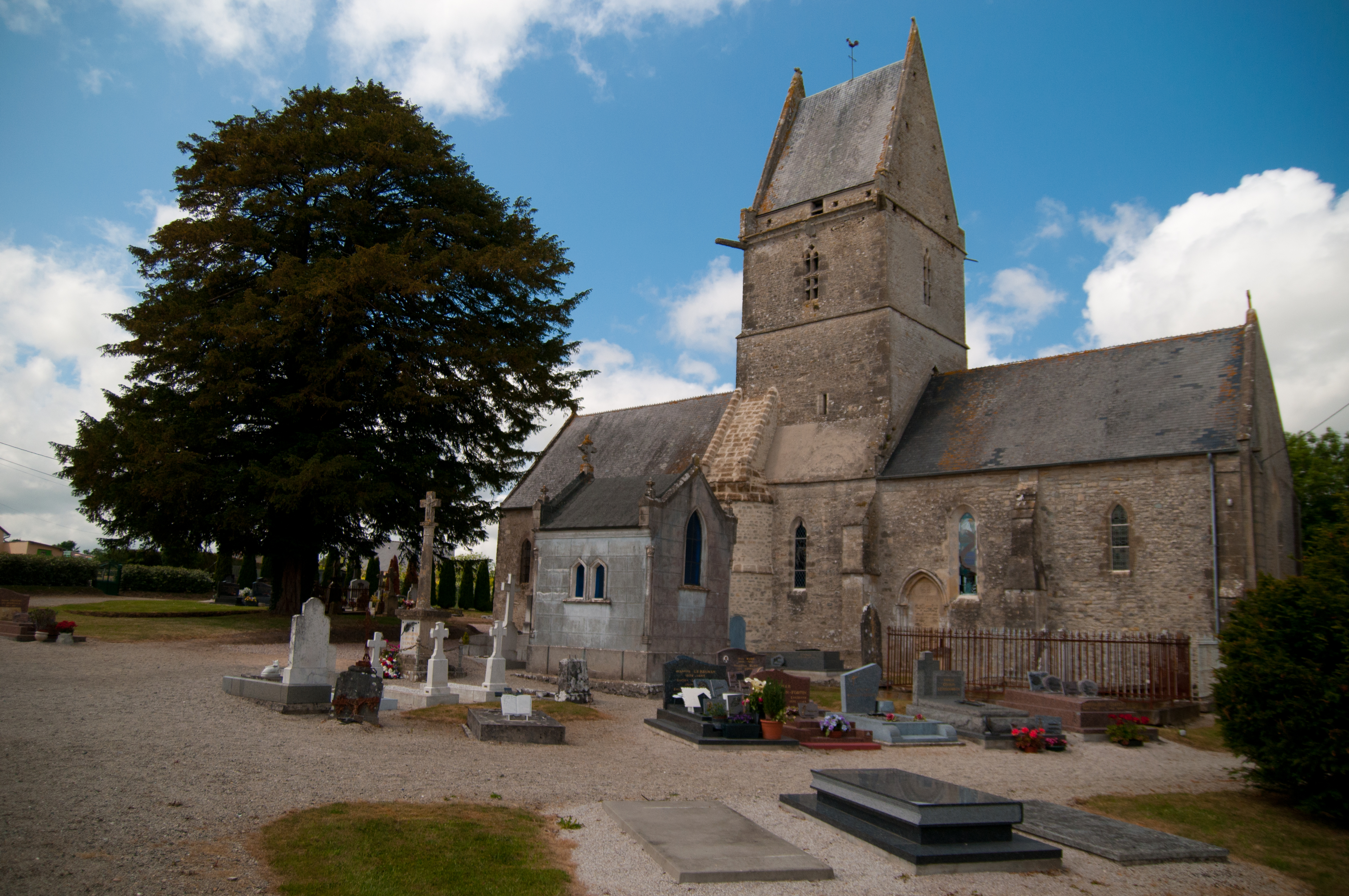
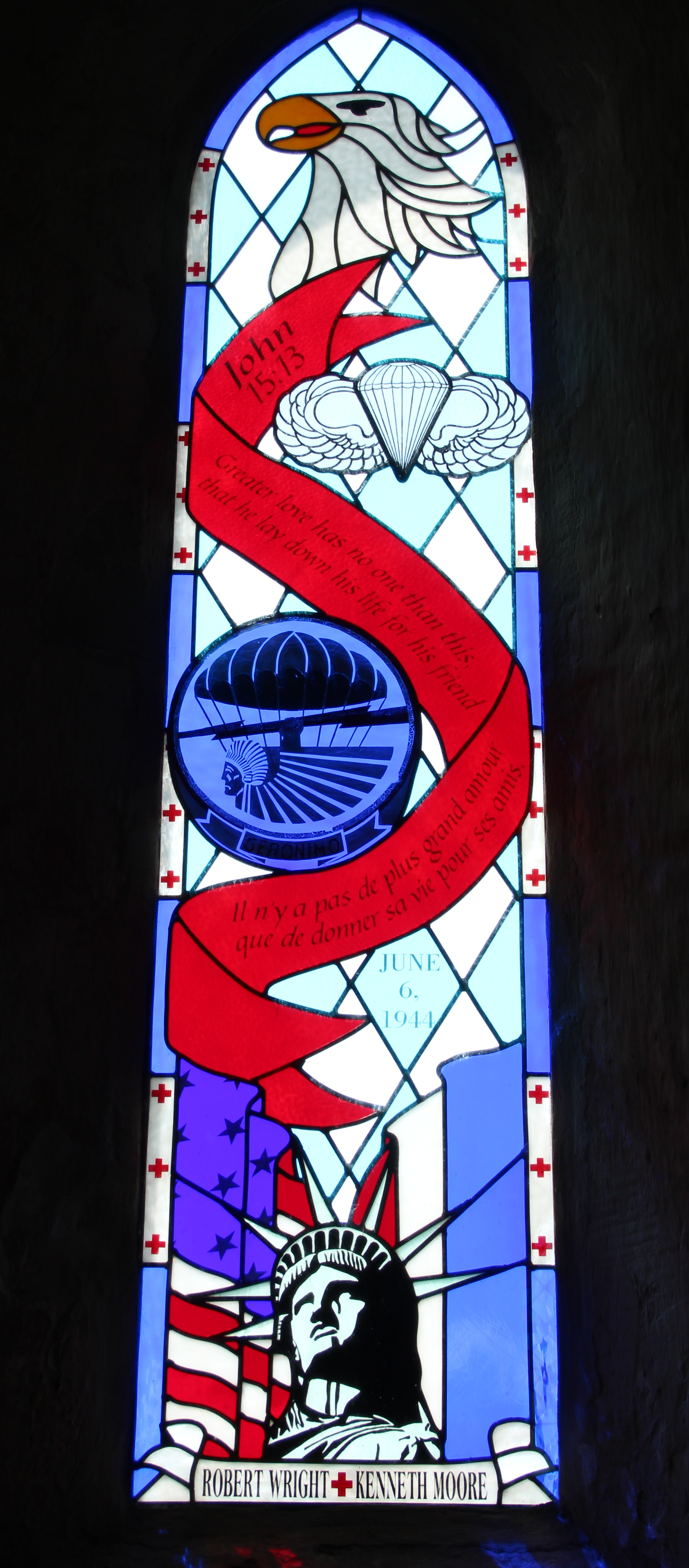
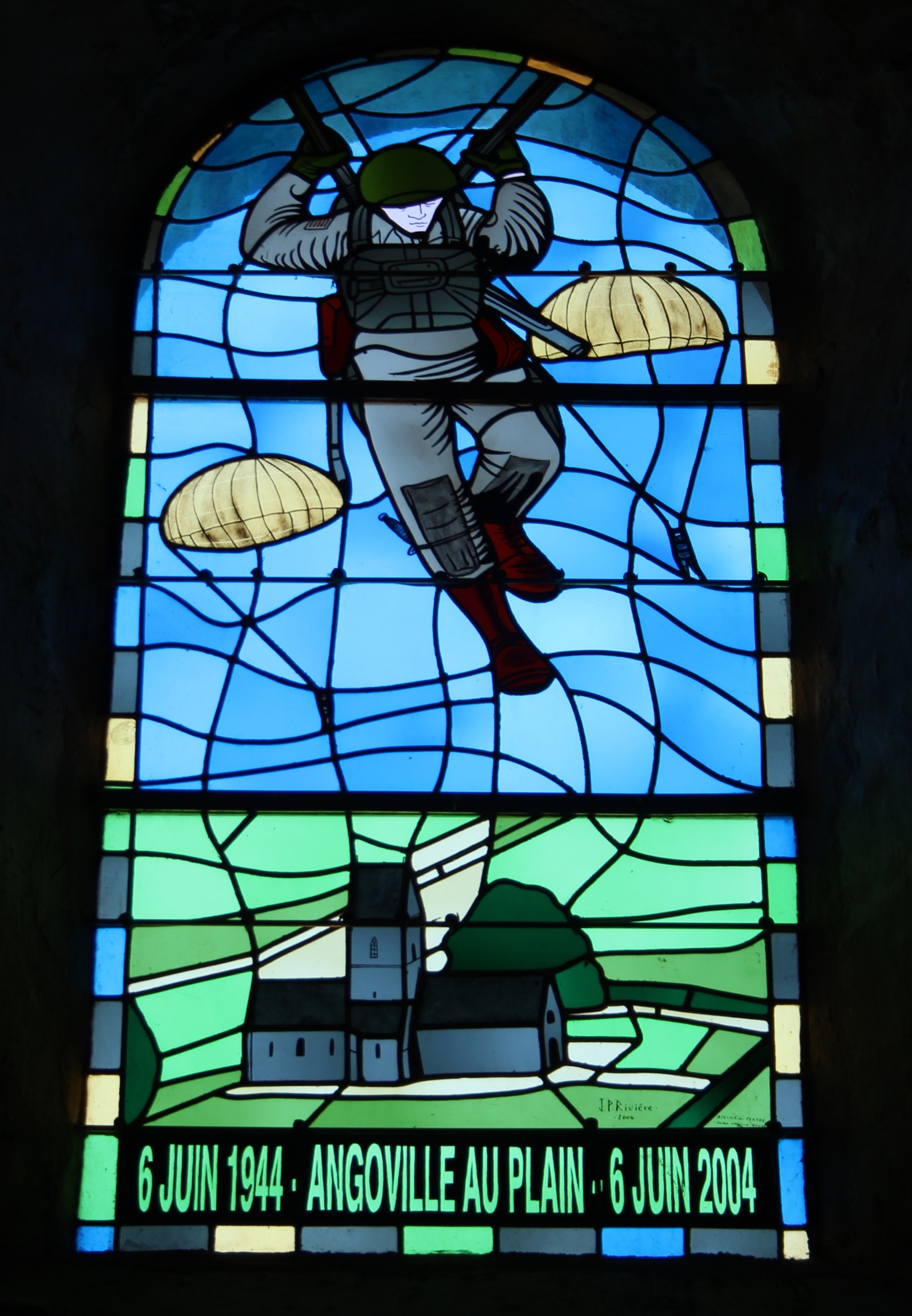
The church at Angoville-au-Plain, and its two windows commemorating the 101st Airborne Division

== See also ==
- Angoville-sur-Ay
- Communes of the Manche department
