= Vierville, Manche =

Vierville
- Part of Carentan-les-Marais
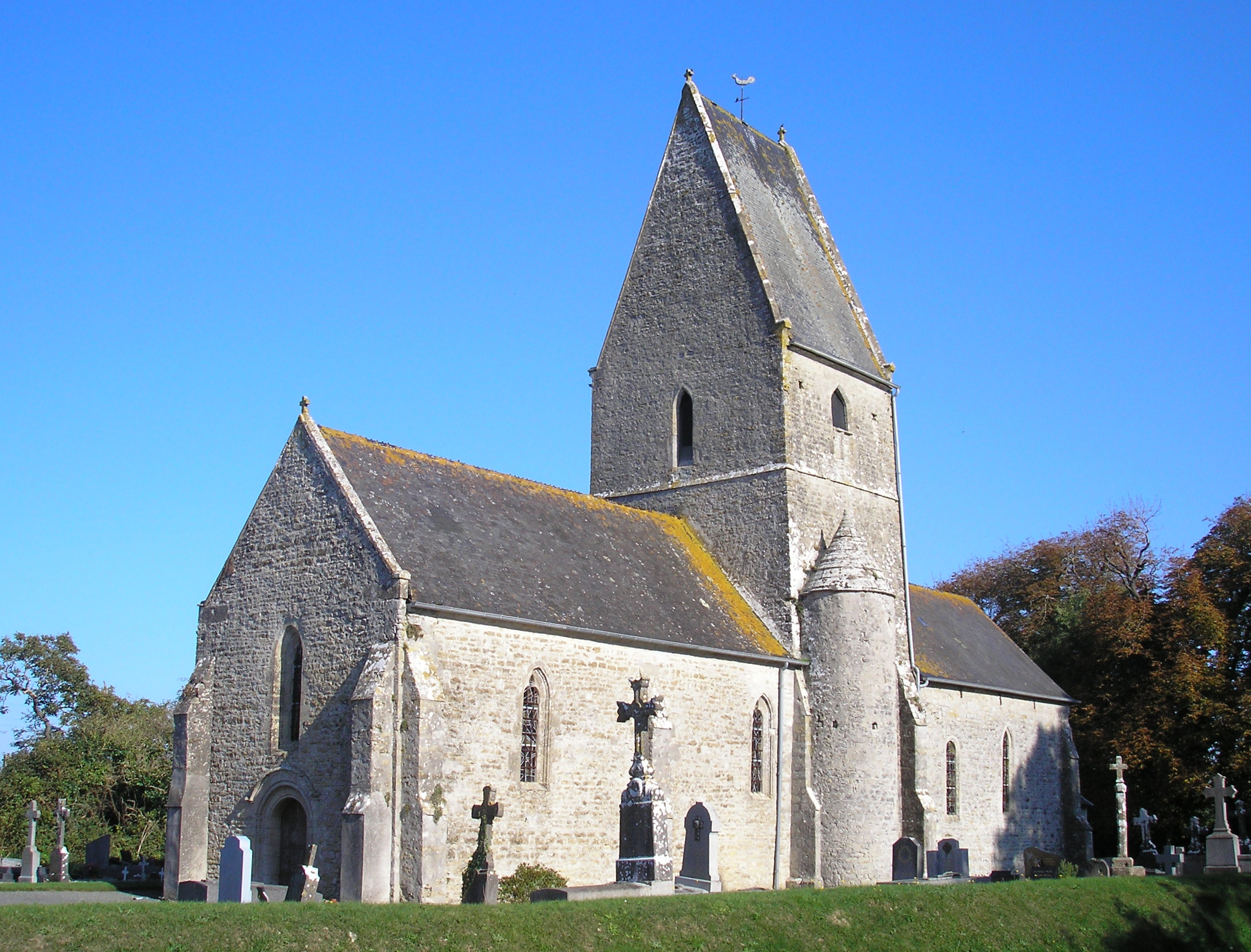
- The church of Saint-Éloi
- Location of Vierville
- Location within France Location within Normandy
- Coordinates: 49°21′40″N 1°14′43″W
- Country: France
- Region: Normandy
- Department: Manche
- Arrondissement: Saint-Lô
- Canton: Carentan
- Commune: Carentan-les-Marais
- Area^{1}: 4.10 km^{2} (1.58 sq mi)
- Highest elevation: 23 m (75 ft)
- Lowest elevation: 2 m (6.6 ft)
- Population (2022): 31
  - Density: 7.6/km^{2} (20/sq mi)
- Time zone: UTC+01:00 (CET)
  - Summer (DST): UTC+02:00 (CEST)
- Postal code: 50480
- ^{1} French Land Register data, which excludes lakes, ponds, glaciers > 1 km^{2} (0.386 sq mi or 247 acres) and river estuaries.

Vierville (French pronunciation: [vjɛʁvil]) is a former commune in the Manche department in Normandy in north-western France. On 1 January 2019, it was merged into the commune Carentan-les-Marais.

== Places and monuments ==
- Mounds Neolithic of Butte (historical monument). Cemetery dating to the Merovingian.
- Church Saint-Eloi (XV), with font emblazoned (XVI).
- Castle (XVIII), listed in the inventory of historical monuments (IMH).
- Fontaine Saint-Eloi and laundry.
- Manoir de Tourville (XVII).

== See also ==
- Communes of the Manche department
