= Catz =

- Part of Carentan-les-Marais
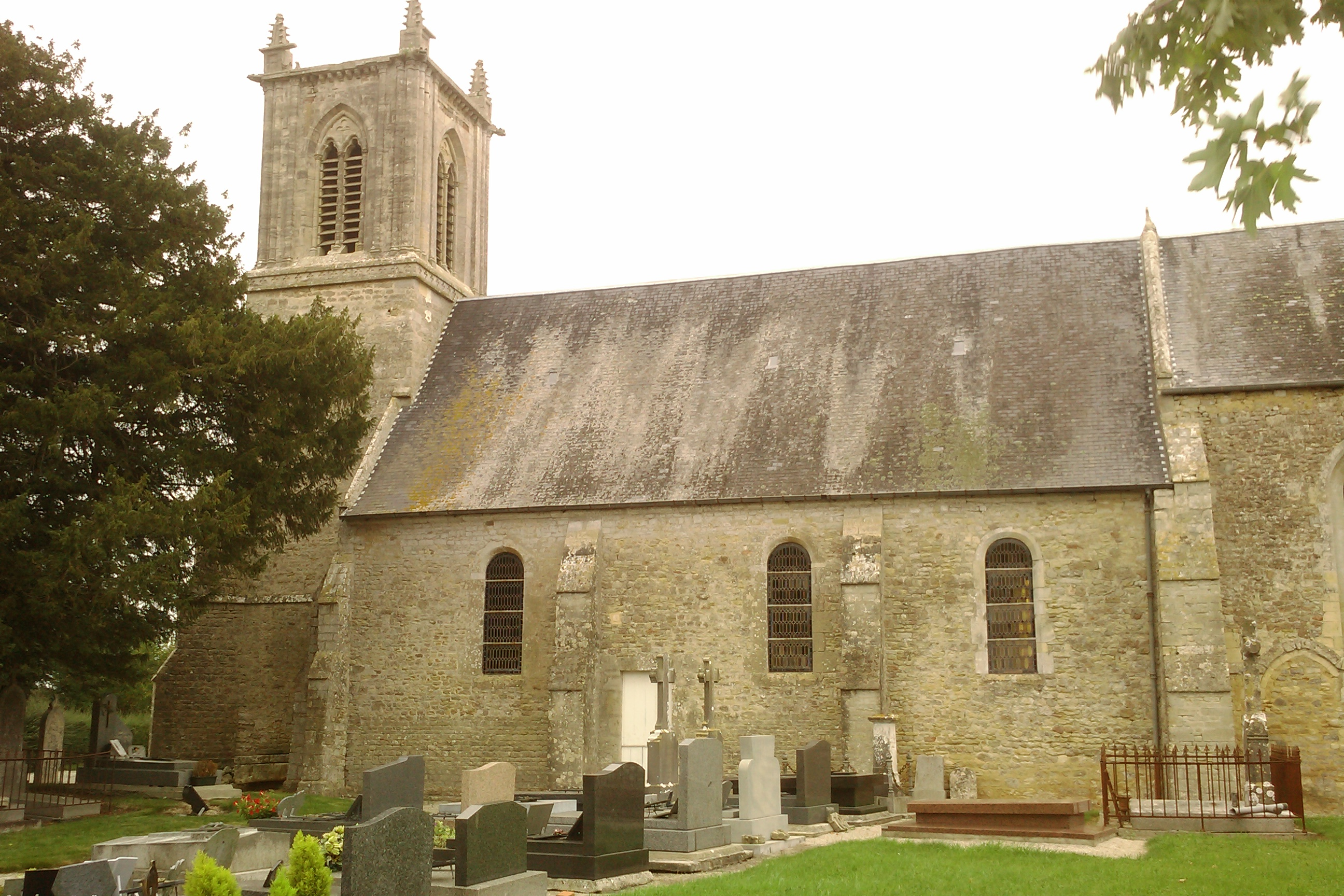
- The church of Saint-Grégoire-le-Grand
- Location of Catz
- Location within France Location within Normandy
- Coordinates: 49°18′41″N 1°10′44″W
- Country: France
- Region: Normandy
- Department: Manche
- Commune: Carentan-les-Marais
- Area^{1}: 2.78 km^{2} (1.07 sq mi)
- Elevation: 15 m (49 ft)
- Highest elevation: 32 m (105 ft)
- Lowest elevation: 0 m (0 ft)
- Population (2022): 106
  - Density: 38.1/km^{2} (98.8/sq mi)
- Time zone: UTC+01:00 (CET)
  - Summer (DST): UTC+02:00 (CEST)
- Postal code: 50500
- ^{1} French Land Register data, which excludes lakes, ponds, glaciers > 1 km^{2} (0.386 sq mi or 247 acres) and river estuaries.

Catz (French pronunciation: [ka]) is a former commune in the Manche department in Normandy in north-western France. On 1 January 2019, it was merged into the commune Carentan-les-Marais.

== See also ==
- Communes of the Manche department
