= Saint-Hilaire-Petitville =

- Part of Carentan-les-Marais
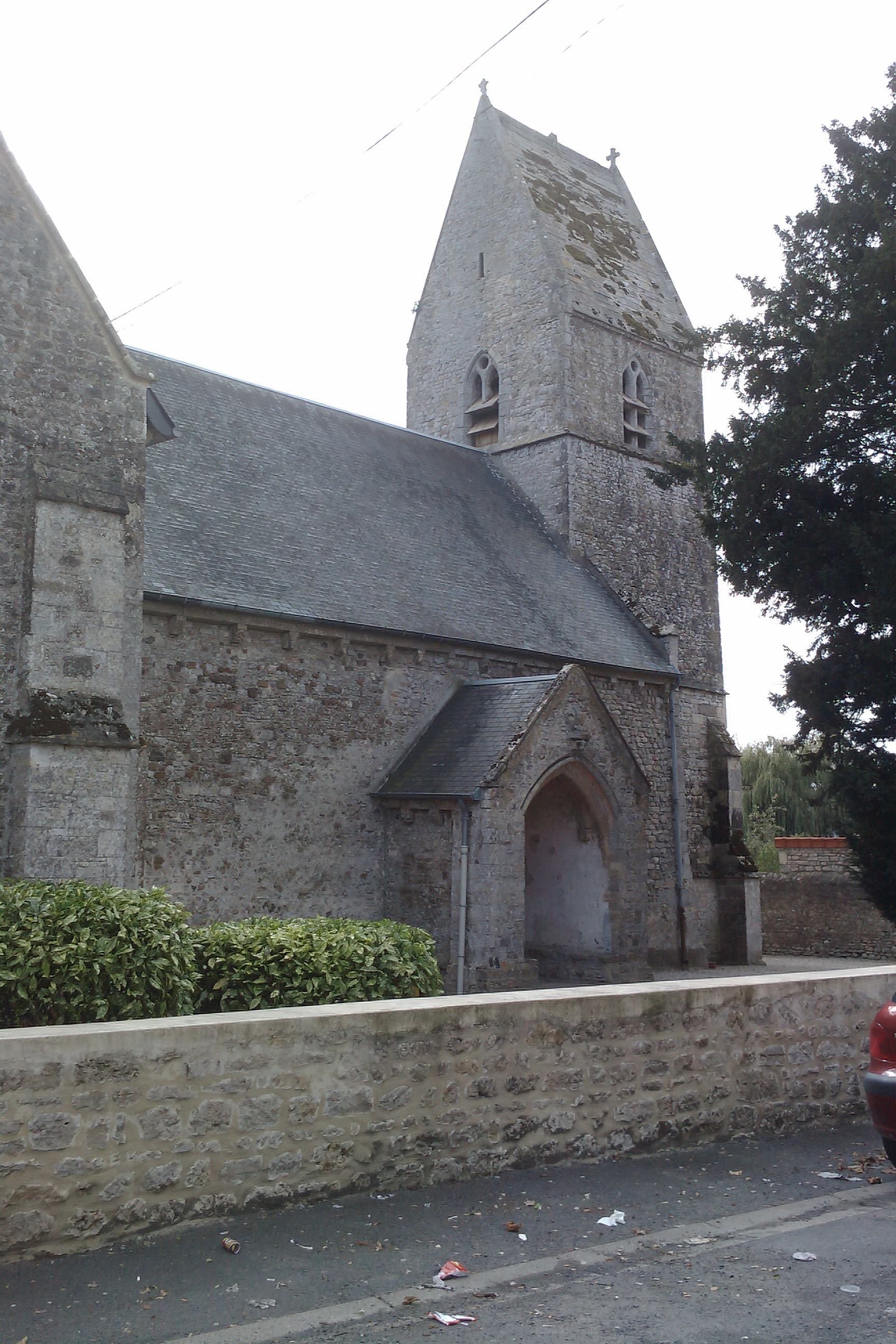
- The church in Saint-Hilaire-Petitville
- Location of Saint-Hilaire-Petitville
- Location within France Location within Normandy
- Coordinates: 49°18′17″N 1°13′35″W
- Country: France
- Region: Normandy
- Department: Manche
- Arrondissement: Saint-Lô
- Canton: Carentan
- Commune: Carentan-les-Marais
- Area^{1}: 9.99 km^{2} (3.86 sq mi)
- Elevation: 8 m (26 ft)
- Highest elevation: 31 m (102 ft)
- Lowest elevation: 0 m (0 ft)
- Population (2022): 1,372
  - Density: 137/km^{2} (356/sq mi)
- Time zone: UTC+01:00 (CET)
  - Summer (DST): UTC+02:00 (CEST)
- Postal code: 50500
- ^{1} French Land Register data, which excludes lakes, ponds, glaciers > 1 km^{2} (0.386 sq mi or 247 acres) and river estuaries.

Saint-Hilaire-Petitville (French pronunciation: [sɛ̃.t‿ilɛʁ pətivil]) is a former commune in the Manche department in Normandy in north-western France with a population of 1,372 (2022). On 1 January 2019, it was merged into the commune Carentan-les-Marais.

== See also ==
- Communes of the Manche department
