= Sándor Vay =

Hungarian poet and journalist (1859–1918)

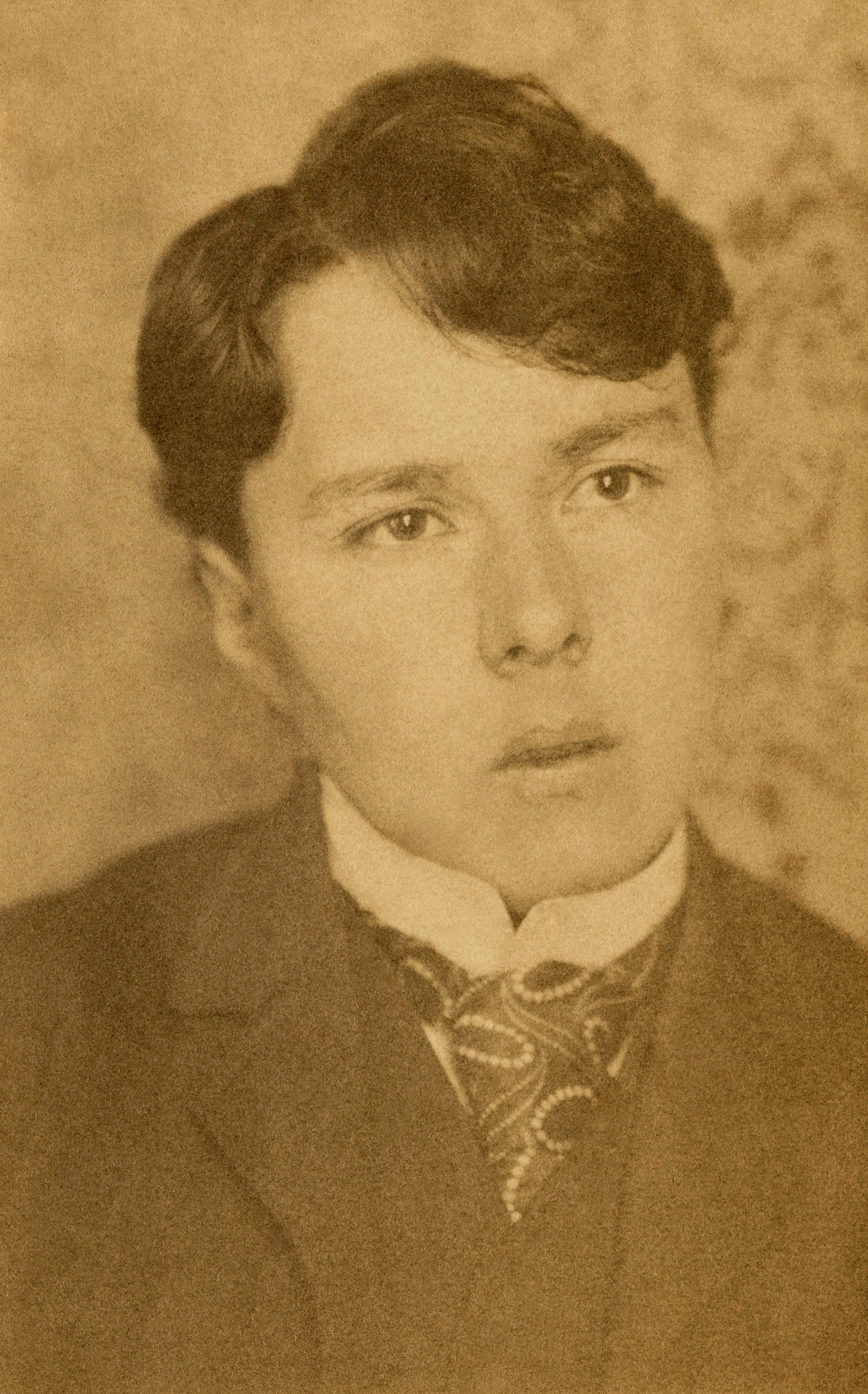
- Born: Sarolta Vay (baptismal name); 6 December 1859; Gyón, Pest Central District, Kingdom of Hungary
- Died: 23 May 1918 (aged 58); Lugano, Switzerland
- Occupations: Journalist; writer
- Spouse(s): Emma Eszéki; Mari Engelhardt
- Writing career
- Years active: 1880–1918

Count Sándor Vay de Vaja et Laskod (6 December 1859 – 23 May 1918) was a Hungarian poet and journalist. As a female, Countess Sarolta Vay was one of the first Hungarian women to complete university studies. Vay worked as a male journalist both before and after the sensational trial for his marriage to a woman in 1889. The case drew the attention of noted sexologists of the period, including Havelock Ellis and Richard von Krafft-Ebing, who used it to explore female inversion in the emerging field of sexology. During his lifetime, he was well respected as an author of historical articles on notable figures and cultural topics related to Hungary. Many of his works have been posthumously republished and are considered an important part of his country's literary heritage.

== Early life ==
Sarolta Vay was born on 6 December 1859 in Gyón, in the Pest Central District, Hungary, to Countess Sarolta (née Beniczky) and Count László Vay. Stemming from the old and noble Vay family who were Counts of Vojvodina and Laskod, his father served as Colonel-General of Archduke Joseph and was the keeper of the crown jewels. His parents were married in 1855 and because of a law that their estates would pass to the crown without an heir, the couple were quite anxious for a male child. Newspapers in the United States widely reported that when Vay was born, his mother did not disclose his sex to the father and colluded with the priest who baptized the child to perform the service with the male name Sándor, but enter the christening in the register with the female name Sarolta. Other accounts, like that of Richard von Krafft-Ebing and Anna Borgos a fellow of the Hungarian Academy of Sciences, indicate that why Vay was raised as a boy is unknown.

In the manner typical for the gentry at that time, Vay was taught fencing, fishing, horseback riding and shooting. When he was born five years later, his brother Péter was raised as a girl. Sándor was taught privately by a friend of his father, Dániel Kászonyi, who was a military captain and journalist. At age eleven, when preparing to send his son to the Pest Noble's Academy, Vay's father learned that Sándor was actually his "daughter". Now known as Sarolta, he was sent to Dresden to his maternal grandmother, Adolfné Bónis Johanna Beniczky, who enrolled him in a girls' school, which required him to wear girls' clothing. After running away with an English girl for whom he had an infatuation, Vay was returned to his parents. He completed his university courses studying in Leipzig, Berlin and Budapest, becoming one of the first Hungarian women to graduate with a university education. Though he had aristocratic roots, Vay needed to find employment as his family finances were strained by his father's inability to earn an adequate living from his farm.

== Career ==
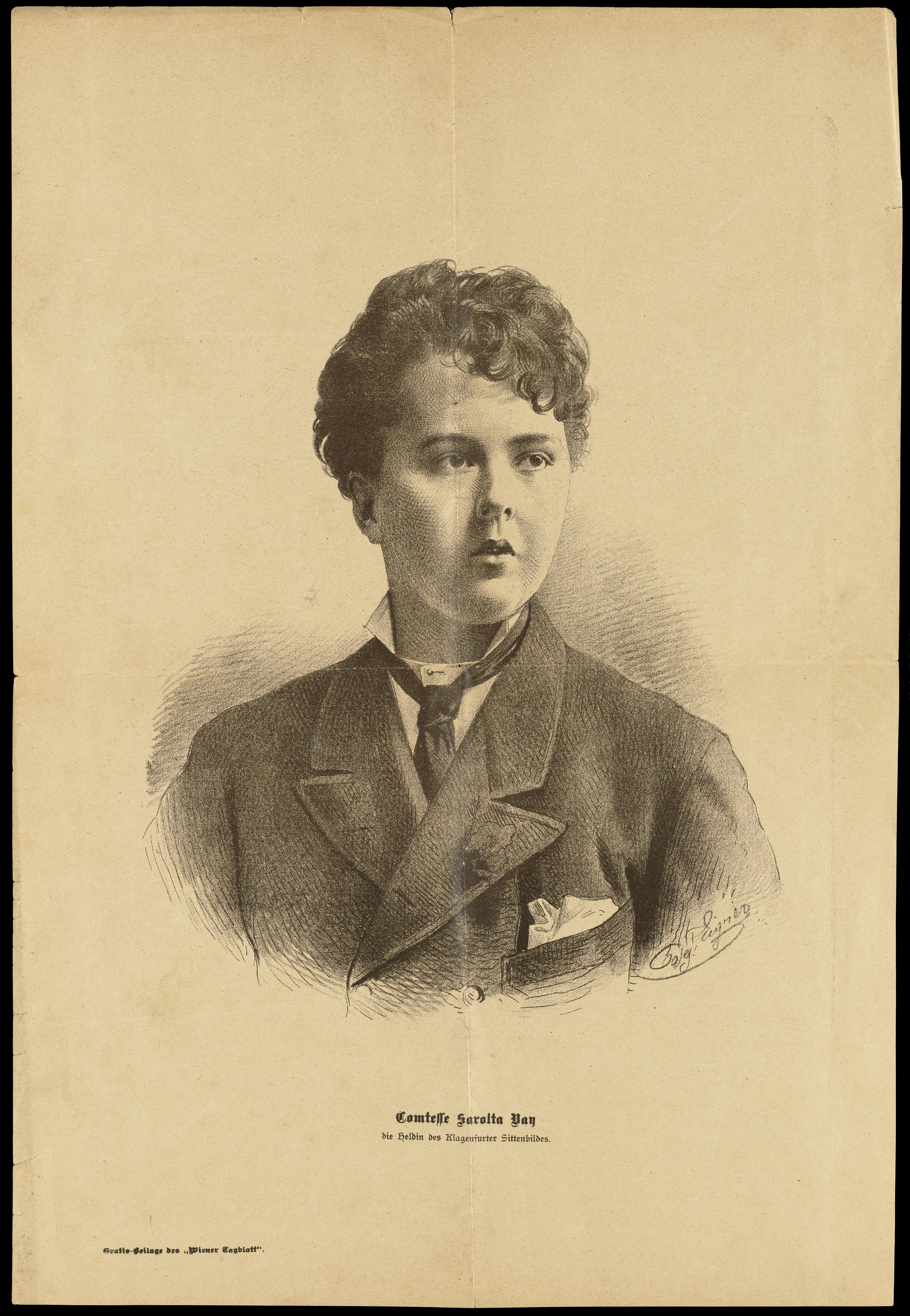
Vay from the Wiener Tagblatt, ca. 1900, by Eigner

At the age of 16, Vay began publishing poems under the name of Sarolta Vay in the Vasárnapi Ujság (Sunday News). Under the mentorship of newspaper editor, Adolf Ágai, he was persuaded to focus on prose and began submitting articles under a variety of male pseudonyms, including Celesztin, D'Artagnan, Floridor, and Vayk. In the era, women journalists were confined to publishing in lifestyle magazines or women's journals. Working as a male not only increased employment opportunities, but as a freelance journalist, Vay had greater freedom and mobility.

From 1880, living entirely as a man, engaging in typical behavior for his class, such as drinking, duels and travel, Vay regularly contributed to such newspapers as Debreczeni Hírlap (Debreczen News), az Egyetértés (The Consent), Magyar Szalon (Hungarian Salon), Országos Hírlap (National News), Pesti Hírlap (Pest News), and az Uj Idők (the New Times), under his male name, Sándor. He was connected to both Renée Erdős and her cousin Minka Czóbel, with whom he corresponded about their writing. Recognizing the nostalgic interest of readers for Hungary's past, Vay began publishing historical articles about well-known people, places, and myths.

== Personal complications ==
Vay was well known in Austria-Hungary and had a reputation as a carouser, frequenting houses of prostitution and night clubs. Around 1882, he was involved in a duel over the actress, Mari Hegyesi, though it is unknown if she returned his affection for her. From 1883 to 1887, he was in another relationship with an actress, Emma Eszéki, whom he had met in Nyíregyháza. The couple were married by a priest and lived together in Pest. Vay ended his relationship with Eszéki when he met Mari Engelhardt, a 26-year-old schoolteacher from Klagenfurt. To free himself from the marriage, Vay paid a large settlement to Eszéki. Against her family's wishes, the new couple eloped and married in August 1889. Struggling financially, possibly due to gambling debts, Vay borrowed Ft800 from his father-in-law, which he claimed was needed as a bond to obtain employment in a stock company. His behavior resulted in his father-in-law coming to believe Vay was a swindler, suing him for fraud, and having him arrested.

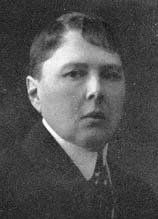
Vay in typical attire

While he was detained, it was discovered that Vay had forged documents and that he was biologically a woman. During the trial, many people, including the Vay family lawyer, various members of both his and his wife's family, several editors and writers, and the Budapest city commander testified about Vay passing as a man. A midwife was called to make a physical examination of Vay's anatomy to determine if he was intersex. His wife, who testified that they had consummated their marriage, also stated at trial that she had no idea that Vay was not a man, though the city commander questioned how that was possible, considering that they lived for several months in one small room. To resolve how Vay might have deceived women while engaged in sex, he was evaluated by C. Birnbacher, who was the Klagenfurt District Court physician, and another physician named Josch. Vay candidly, though reluctantly, explained to the physicians his attractions to women and described their encounters.

Based upon the physicians' statements to the court, that Vay was an invert and unable to behave differently, the court acquitted Vay of fraud and released him without requiring him to revert to his biological sex. The father-in-law appealed the verdict, which was then reviewed by Theodor Meynert, a member of the medical faculty at the University of Vienna. Meynert concluded that Birnbacher and Josch had been duped by Vay, who was clearly anatomically a woman. Birnbacher answered that prior to arrest, Vay had led a typical life and did not desire to change his behavior. He had no history of violence, nor had his family or acquaintances felt he needed to be institutionalized. Birnbacher found that the masculine traits Vay exhibited were clearly a part of his identity. He concluded that given a family history of mental instability, Vay was predisposed to mental illness. Coupled with his innate inversion, Birnbacher attested that Vay could not be held responsible for his behavior.

== Later life ==
When the trial was over, Vay returned to Budapest and his journalism career. Though he wrote to correspondents expressing frustration with loneliness, lack of recognition, and financial difficulties, Vay had his greatest success between 1900 and 1910. He compiled over 400 stories and published them in 15 volumes, becoming a popular and well-established author. In 1906, he began working as a merchant in Rijeka. He sold coffee and imported goods, and wrote and distributed a free newspaper called the Kávé Ujság (Coffee News). Though initially promising, his business failed and he returned to journalism.

In 1908, a street in his home town was named Count Sándor Vay, in his honor and the following year, he published 10 volumes of Gróf Vay Sándor munkái (The Works of Count Sándor Vay). After 1910, newspaper and book publishers were reluctant to publish Vay's works. He moved to Switzerland and wrote stories which were published in the Sunday edition of Pesti Hírlap. Living in Zürich at the beginning of World War I, he became stranded, but for three years was able to continue sending articles to Hungary for publication.

== Death and legacy ==
In March 1918, suffering from pneumonia, Vay was admitted to hospital. After undergoing surgery, he died of pleurisy on 23 May 1918 in Lugano. Obituaries in Hungary lamented his passing and called him "Hungary's George Sand", emphasizing the loss his death would be to Hungarian literature. In 1929, his brother, who had become a missionary of the Order of Friars Minor Capuchin of Assisi, proposed a memorial be built to Vay in their home town. It was not realized, and though the "Count" was stricken from the street named in Vay's honor during Hungary's Soviet period, it was restored in 1989.

Vay's legal case was an influential one in the development of medical analysis of lesbians. The case was studied and published in journals by eminent sexologists, including Havelock Ellis and Richard von Krafft-Ebing. Sociologist and historian Hanna Hacker has described Vay as an archetype for the development of medical and psychiatric construction of the characteristics of lesbian identity and a model of butch women for the development of the field of sexology. The case itself marked the first time that passing had been judged on a medical basis rather than a legal/moral one. It also represented a shift from using punishment as a means of restoring social norms to an approach which attempted to understand and explain the underlying causes of anti-social behavior. The influence of the case was not limited to the medical profession, as "Simone de Beauvoir based her comments on lesbianism in The Second Sex on Vay's story".

Vay's literary legacy influenced many Hungarian writers, including János Dengi, Kinga Fabó, Géza Gyóni, Frigyes Karinthy, Gyula Krúdy, István Örkény, and Zsuzsa Rakovszky. Sándor Weöres attempted to produce a drama about Vay in the 1970s, but was unable to publish it. Vay's own works were successfully republished posthumously. In 1918, his Pestvármegyei históriák (Stories of Pestvár County), originally published in 1907 was republished and in 1924, his 10-volume Gróf Vay Sándor munkái (The Works of Count Sándor Vay) was re-released. In 1926 Singer and Wolfner Publishing re-bound Régi nemes urak, úrasszonyok: históriák, legendák, virtusos cselekedetek (Old Noble Gentlemen, Gentlewomen: Stories, Legends, Virtuous Deeds) published originally in 1908, for distribution by the Ministry of Religion and Public Education. In 1986, Ágota Steinert edited and published selections from the 1900 publication Régi magyar társasélet (Old Hungarian Social Life). In 2000, József Radnai, published Vay Sarolta: Levelek a buckából (Sarolta Vay: Letters from the Mound), which contained a carefully researched compilation of 19 stories by Vay. Additional works such as Európa bál (European Ball, 2006), Virág borul minden rögre: versek (Flowers Fall on Every Nugget: Poems, 2009) and Nemzeti Örökség (National Heritage, 2012) were also posthumously published. Steinert, a literary historian, notes that while textbooks can relay history, Vay remains relevant as his works convey an intimate knowledge of his age.

== Selected works ==
- Adolf, Ágai (1900). Régi magyar társasélet (in Hungarian). Budapest: Atheneum. OCLC 1087830188. Responsibility: Vay Sarolta d'Artagnan
- Vay, Sándor Gróf (1903). D'Artagnan meséi (in Hungarian). Budapest: Voss József. OCLC 1014692999.
- Vay, Sándor Gróf (1907). Pestvármegyei históriák (in Hungarian). Budapest: Érdekes Újság Kiadóhivatala. OCLC 34277428.
- Vay, Sándor Gróf (1908). Régi nemes urak, úrasszonyok: históriák, legendák, virtusos cselekedetek (in Hungarian). Budapest: Singer és Wolfner. OCLC 917185298.
- Vay, Sándor Gróf (1909). Gróf Vay Sándor munkái (in Hungarian). Budapest: Országos Monografia Társaság. OCLC 499572198. In ten volumes: I. A régi világból; II. A mikor még postakocsin jártak; III. Lavotta szerelme és egyéb elbeszélések; IV. A királyné poétája és más elbeszélések; V. Udvari dámák leveleiből és más elbeszélések; VI. Megfakult írások; VII. A palatinus huszárok; VIII. Erzsébet királynéról és más krónikás följegyzések; IX. Elpusztult urak; X. Ősökről – unokáknak
- Vay, Sándor; Szávai, Géza (forward) (2006). Európa bál: tárcák és elbeszélések (in Hungarian). Budapest: Pont Kiadó. ISBN 978-963-7265-31-0. [posthumous]
- Vay, Sándor (2009). Kapui, Ágota; Valentyik, Ferenc (eds.). Virág borul minden rögre: versek (in Hungarian). Dabas, Hungary: Grafilux Kft. ISBN 978-963-06-8081-3. [posthumous]
- Vay, Sándor Gróf (2012). Az Andrássyak (in Hungarian). Onga, Hungary: Nemzeti Örökség. ISBN 978-615-5242-37-3. [posthumous]
