= Vay (company) =

German remote driving company

Vay, Inc.
- Company type: Private
- Industry: Car rental
- Founded: September 2018; 7 years ago
- Founders: Thomas von der Ohe; Fabrizio Sclesi; Bogdan Djukic
- Headquarters: Berlin, Germany
- Area served: Las Vegas, Nevada, United States
- Key people: Thomas von der Ohe (CEO)
- Products: Self-driving cars
- Website: vay.io

Vay is a German remote driving company that offers remote-controlled rental cars.

The cars are remotely driven by humans from driving stations. Vay has offices in Berlin, Germany, and Portland, Oregon, US.

Vay was founded in September 2018 by Thomas von der Ohe, Fabrizio Scelsi, and Bogdan Djukic. Investors in the company include Atomico.

The chief executive (CEO) is Thomas von der Ohe, who has a degree in computer science and entrepreneurship from Stanford University.

As of January 2024, the company has been operating in Las Vegas.
