= CyberExtension =

- Developer(s): Right Reason Technologies
- Operating system: Cross-platform
- Type: Virtual Learning Environment
- Website: CyberExtension Product Page

CyberExtension is a managed virtual learning environment built by Right Reason Technologies (RRT) that is designed to be used as an online extension of a school district in the USA. The system is currently used for homebound students, credit recovery and supplemental coursework, and has been successfully deployed to help students with "school phobia" and students undergoing medical treatment.

In addition to being a Virtual Learning Environment, CyberExtension is a "Managed Learning Environment" in that one or more RRT employees are assigned as liaison to the client school district. Liaison responsibilities include training staff and students, helping teachers enter coursework, and assisting in day-to-day running of the system.

CyberExtension maps every lesson in the system to at least one educational standard. The system includes content creation tools, content management, chat, internal email system, gradebooks and assessments.

== Background ==
CyberExtension developed from a successful distance learning experiment, the Virtual Education Academy (VEA), which was funded from a Federal Grant sponsored by East Stroudsburg University for the creation and deployment of a distance learning platform aimed primarily at the homebound student population. VEA beta-testing ran in three school districts from September 2003 to June 2004. Subsequent enhancements included content creation tools, gradebooks, chat, internal email, calendar, and the addition of on-site support staff liaisons from RRT to assist with the day-to-day operations.

== See also ==
Virtual learning environment
