= McVeigh =

McVeigh is a surname of Scottish and Irish origin from Gaelic Mac Bheatha or Mac an Bheatha, The name is common in east Ulster, particularly Armagh. Variations include MacVay, MacVey, McVey, McVeagh. Notable people with the surname include:

- Andrea McVeigh, New Zealand netball commentator
- Annita McVeigh, British newsreader
- Brian J. McVeigh (born 1959), American anthropologist
- Charles McVeigh (1898–1984), Canadian ice hockey player
- Jack McVeigh (born 1996), Australian basketball player
- Jarrad McVeigh (born 1985), Australian rules footballer
- Jimmy McVeigh (born 1949), English football defender
- John McVeigh (footballer) (born 1957), Scottish football midfielder
- John McVeigh (politician) (born 1965), Australian politician
- John J. McVeigh (1921–1944), United States Army soldier
- Mark McVeigh (born 1981), Australian rules footballer
- Olivia McVeigh, Northern Irish makeup artist, influencer and podcaster
- Paul McVeigh (born 1977), Northern Irish professional footballer
- Timothy McVeigh (1968–2001), American domestic terrorist, perpetrator of the Oklahoma City bombing
- Timothy R. McVeigh (born 1961), United States Navy sailor
- Tom McVeigh (born 1930), Australian politician

== See also ==
- McVeigh (film), 2024 American film directed by Mike Ott
- McVay, surname
- McVey, surname
