= McVay =

McVay is a surname. Notable people with the surname include:

- Bobby McVay, British broadcaster and musician, presenter of the breakfast show on Real Radio in South Wales
- Charles B. McVay, Jr. (1868–1949), admiral in the United States Navy after World War I
- Charles B. McVay III (1898–1968), the Commanding Officer of the USS Indianapolis (CA-35) when it was lost in action in 1945
- Hugh McVay (1766–1851), the ninth Governor of the U.S. state of Alabama from July 17 to November 22, 1837
- Jimmy McVay (1889–1950), footballer
- John McVay (1931–2022), American football coach and executive
- Kenneth McVay, OBC (born 1940), Canadian-American dual citizen and Internet activist against Holocaust denial
- Kimo Wilder McVay (1927–2001), musician turned talent manager, who successfully promoted Hawaiian entertainment acts
- Sean McVay (born 1986), American football coach
- Swifty McVay (born 1974), American rapper and most notably, a member of Detroit rap group, D12

== See also ==
- McVeigh, surname
- McVey, surname
