= Mari Hegyesi =

Hungarian actress (1861–1925)

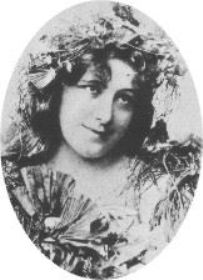
- Born: Maria Berghammer; 28 December 1861; Padua
- Died: 28 November 1925 (aged 63); Budapest, Józsefváros
- Occupation: Actress

Marie Hegysi, born Maria Berghammer (28 December 1861 Padua– 28 November 1925 Budapest, Józsefváros) was a Hungarian actress.

== Life ==
She was the daughter of József Berghammer and Francisca Schön.she was discovered by Ignaz Kercsany at the age of 16 and made her stage debut in his company in Békéscsaba in 1878. she then performed in Pécs between 1879 and 1886 and again in Košice, Debrecen and Arad under Ignaz Kercsany's management. Hegyesi made her debut on 4 March 1886 at the National Theatre, and remained a member until her death. In March 1918 she was elected a permanent member of the theatre. she achieved success in dramatic and heroic roles in the countryside and was also signed to the National Theatre, but her true talent blossomed in the later period of its activity, in maternal roles. In the first quarter of the century, she was one of the most intellectual and honest dramatic artists of the National Theater.

== Theatre roles ==
- Rózsi (Ede Szigligeti: Cigány)
- Olívia (William Shakespeare: Twelfth Night)
- Éva (Imre Madách: The Tragedy of Man)
- Hermione (William Shakespeare: The Winter's Tale)
- Gina (Henrik Ibsen: The Wild Duck)
- Lady Windermere (Oscar Wilde: Lady Windermere's fan)
- Bernd Róza (Hauptmann)
- Róza (Heijermans: Remény)
- Tanítóné (Lajos Zilahy: Süt a nap)

== Film roles ==
- A szökött katona (1914)
- Meseország (1922)
- Az ifjú Medardus (1923)
