= Carmen Valle Vea =

Mexican politician

- Born: 16 July 1979 (age 46); Sonora, Mexico
- Occupation: Politician
- Political party: PAN

Carmen Lizeth Valle Vea (born 16 July 1979) is a Mexican politician from the National Action Party. In 2012 she served as Deputy of the LXI Legislature of the Mexican Congress representing Sonora.
