= Les Veys =

- Part of Carentan-les-Marais
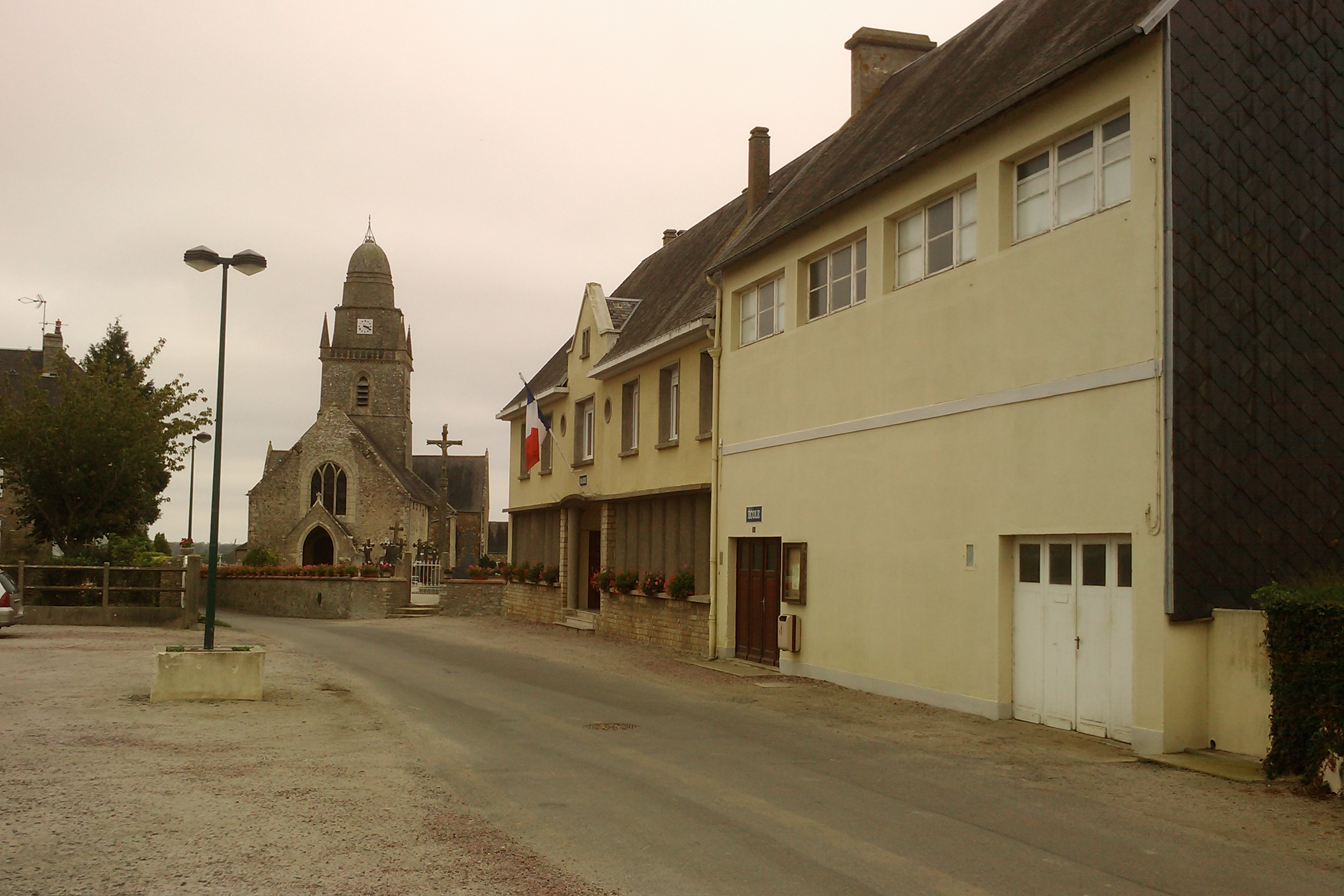
- Town hall and Saint-Martin church
- Location of Les Veys
- Location within France Location within Normandy
- Coordinates: 49°18′57″N 1°09′04″W
- Country: France
- Region: Normandy
- Department: Manche
- Arrondissement: Saint-Lô
- Canton: Carentan
- Commune: Carentan-les-Marais
- Area^{1}: 14.88 km^{2} (5.75 sq mi)
- Elevation: 20 m (66 ft)
- Highest elevation: 32 m (105 ft)
- Lowest elevation: 0 m (0 ft)
- Population (2022): 479
  - Density: 32.2/km^{2} (83.4/sq mi)
- Time zone: UTC+01:00 (CET)
  - Summer (DST): UTC+02:00 (CEST)
- Postal code: 50500
- ^{1} French Land Register data, which excludes lakes, ponds, glaciers > 1 km^{2} (0.386 sq mi or 247 acres) and river estuaries.

Les Veys (French pronunciation: [le vɛ]) is a former commune in the Manche department in Normandy in north-western France. On 1 January 2017, it was merged into the commune Carentan-les-Marais.

== See also ==
- Communes of the Manche department
