= Saint-Pellerin, Manche =

Saint-Pellerin
- Part of Carentan-les-Marais
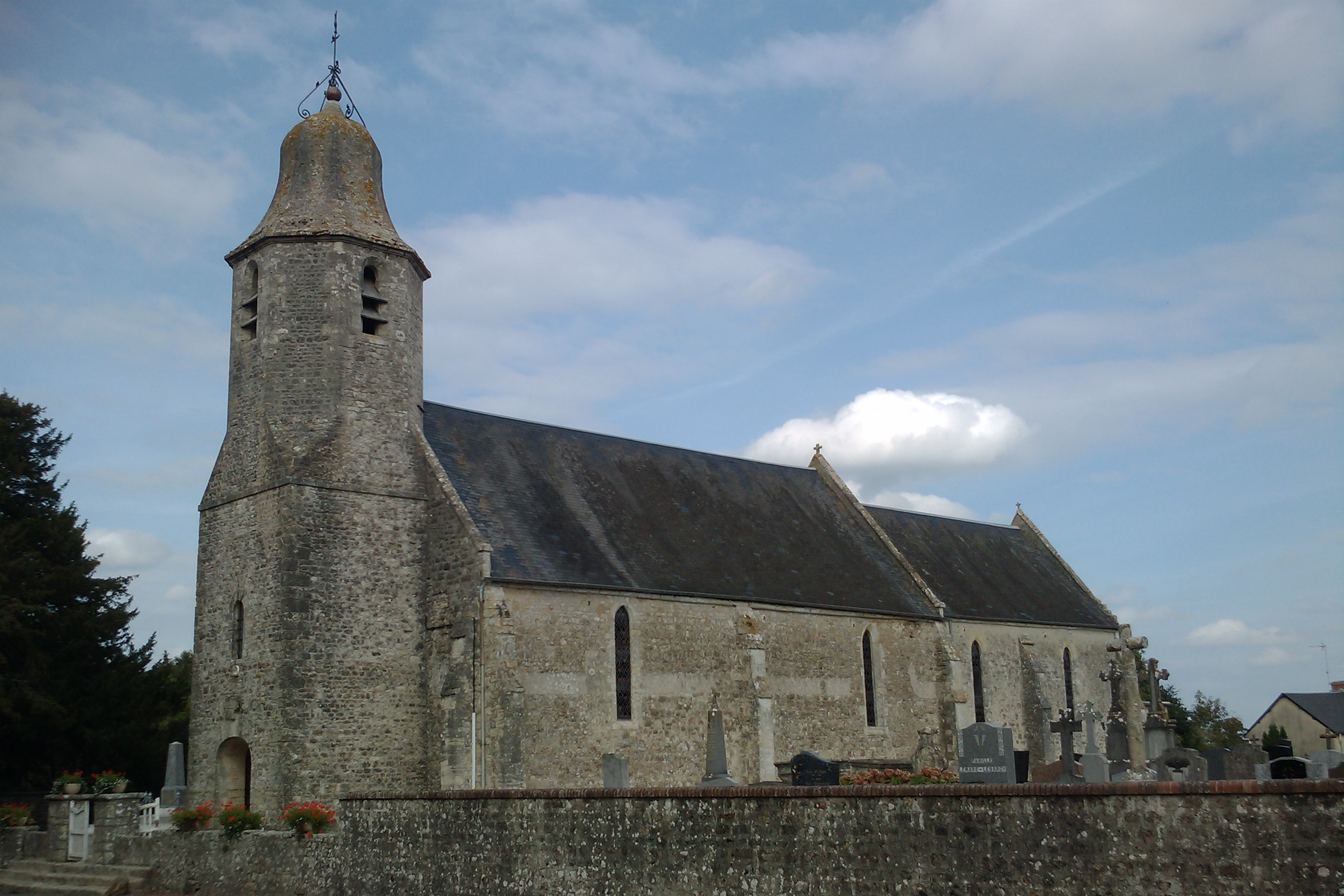
- Location of Saint-Pellerin
- Location within France Location within Normandy
- Coordinates: 49°17′55″N 1°10′37″W
- Country: France
- Region: Normandy
- Department: Manche
- Arrondissement: Saint-Lô
- Canton: Carentan
- Commune: Carentan-les-Marais
- Area^{1}: 4.37 km^{2} (1.69 sq mi)
- Elevation: 30 m (98 ft)
- Highest elevation: 35 m (115 ft)
- Lowest elevation: 0 m (0 ft)
- Population (2022): 350
  - Density: 80/km^{2} (210/sq mi)
- Time zone: UTC+01:00 (CET)
  - Summer (DST): UTC+02:00 (CEST)
- Postal code: 50500
- ^{1} French Land Register data, which excludes lakes, ponds, glaciers > 1 km^{2} (0.386 sq mi or 247 acres) and river estuaries.

Saint-Pellerin (French pronunciation: [sɛ̃ pɛlʁɛ̃]) is a former commune in the Manche department in Normandy in north-western France. On 1 January 2017, it was merged into the commune Carentan-les-Marais.

== See also ==
- Communes of the Manche department
