= The Lion and the Mouse (disambiguation) =

The Lion and the Mouse is one of Aesop's Fables.

The Lion and the Mouse may also refer to:

- The Lion and the Mouse, a 1905 play by Charles Klein
- The Lion and the Mouse (1914 film), a lost 1914 silent film drama
- The Lion and the Mouse (1919 film), a lost silent film directed by Tom Terriss
- The Lion and the Mouse (1928 film), a film based on Klein's play
- The Lion and the Mouse, a 1943 Terrytoons cartoon
- The Lion and the Mouse (painting), a painting by Peter Paul Rubens and Frans Snyders
- The Lion & the Mouse, a 2009 children's book by Jerry Pinkney
- The Lion and Mouse, a sculpture by Marshall Fredericks
