= Soulles =

- Part of Bourgvallées
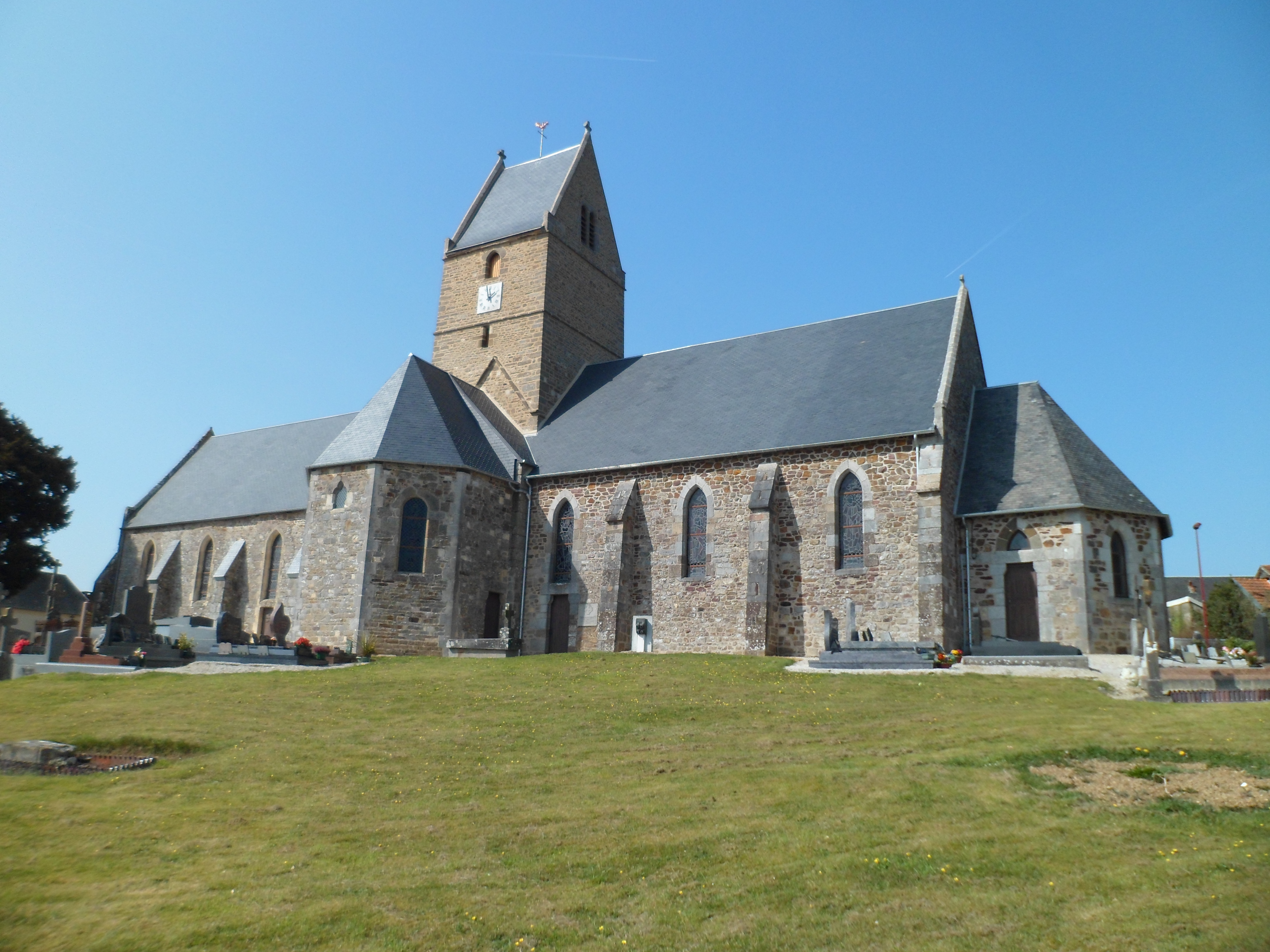
- The church of Saint-Martin
- Location of Soulles
- Location within France Location within Normandy
- Coordinates: 49°00′54″N 1°11′15″W
- Country: France
- Region: Normandy
- Department: Manche
- Arrondissement: Saint-Lô
- Canton: Saint-Lô-2
- Commune: Bourgvallées
- Area^{1}: 14.86 km^{2} (5.74 sq mi)
- Elevation: 104 m (341 ft)
- Highest elevation: 180 m (590 ft)
- Lowest elevation: 81 m (266 ft)
- Population (2022): 466
  - Density: 31.4/km^{2} (81.2/sq mi)
- Time zone: UTC+01:00 (CET)
  - Summer (DST): UTC+02:00 (CEST)
- Postal code: 50750
- ^{1} French Land Register data, which excludes lakes, ponds, glaciers > 1 km^{2} (0.386 sq mi or 247 acres) and river estuaries.

Soulles (French pronunciation: [sul]) is a former commune in the Manche department in Normandy in north-western France. On 1 January 2019, it was merged into the commune Bourgvallées.

== See also ==
- Communes of the Manche department
