= Fernand Le Rachinel =

French politician and Member of the European Parliament (born 1942)

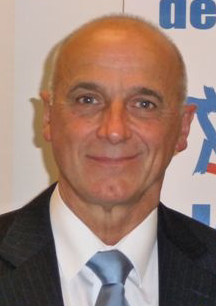
- Fernand Le Rachinel in 2012

Member of the European Parliament
- In office 2004–2009
- Preceded by: Chantal Simonot

Member of the Regional council of Lower Normandy
- In office 1986–2006
- President: René Garrec; Philippe Duron

Personal details
- Born: 4 June 1942 (age 83) Gourfaleur, Manche, France
- Party: National Front; Party of France

Fernand Le Rachinel (born 4 June 1942) is a French politician and Member of the European Parliament for the north-west of France. He is a member of the National Front, and is therefore a Non-Inscrit in the European Parliament. He sits on the European Parliament's Committee on Transport and Tourism.

Le Rachinel is also a substitute for the Committee on Industry, Research and Energy and a member of the delegation for relations with the Korean Peninsula. He entered the European Parliament on 22 October 2004, replacing Chantal Simonot, who resigned on 1 October.

== Career ==
- Certificate of elementary education
- Active military service in Algeria (1962–1963)
- Meilleur Ouvrier de France in printing
- Former president of commercial court
- Former union chairman
- Honorary member of Manche Departmental Council
- Member of Lower Normandy Regional council
- Member of the European Parliament (1994–1999)
- Knight of the National Order of Merit
