= Le Mesnil-Herman =

- Part of Bourgvallées
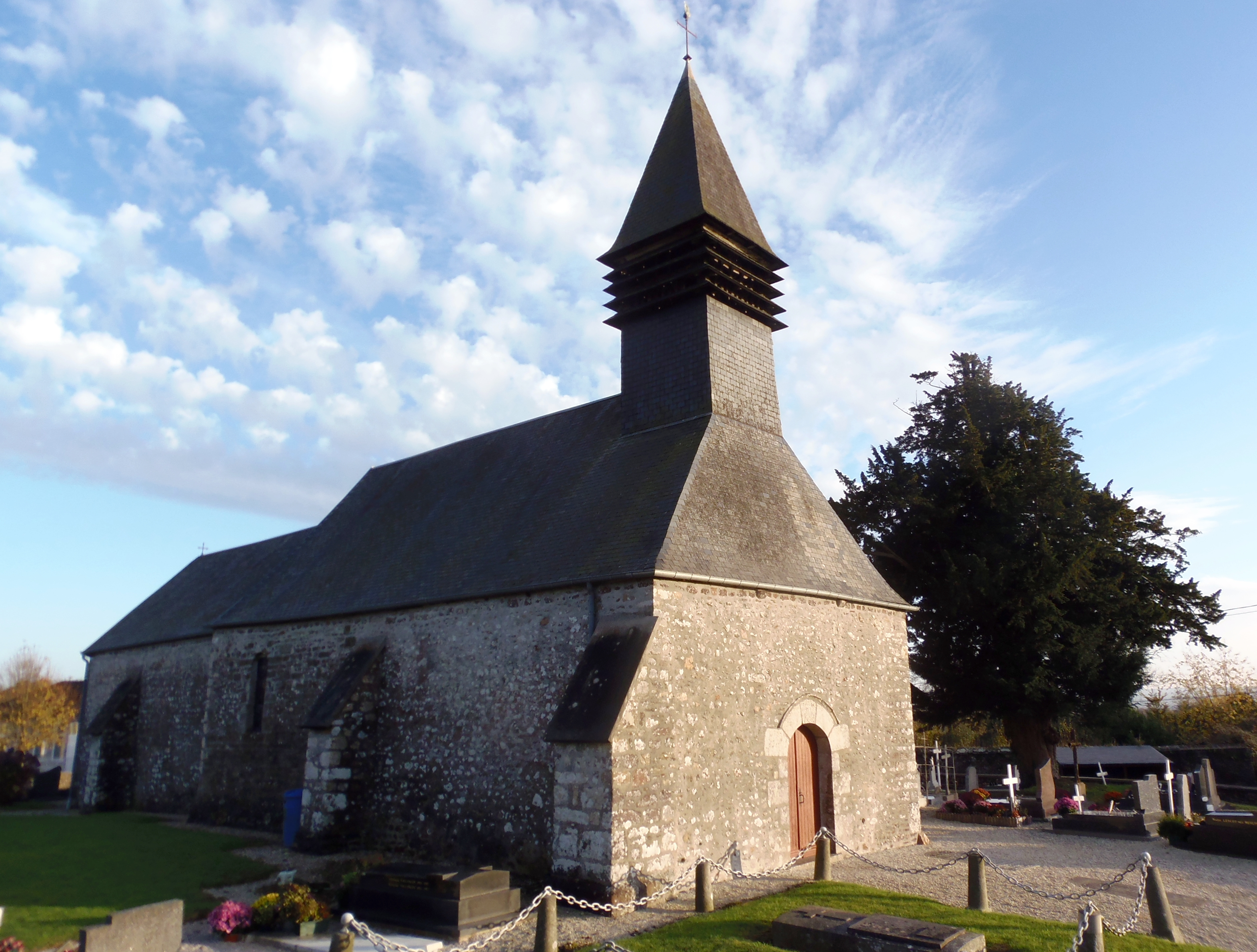
- The church of Saint-Pierre
- Location of Le Mesnil-Herman
- Location within France Location within Normandy
- Coordinates: 49°01′33″N 1°08′39″W
- Country: France
- Region: Normandy
- Department: Manche
- Arrondissement: Saint-Lô
- Canton: Saint-Lô-2
- Commune: Bourgvallées
- Area^{1}: 1.91 km^{2} (0.74 sq mi)
- Elevation: 140 m (460 ft)
- Highest elevation: 150 m (490 ft)
- Lowest elevation: 90 m (300 ft)
- Population (2022): 138
  - Density: 72.3/km^{2} (187/sq mi)
- Time zone: UTC+01:00 (CET)
  - Summer (DST): UTC+02:00 (CEST)
- Postal code: 50750
- ^{1} French Land Register data, which excludes lakes, ponds, glaciers > 1 km^{2} (0.386 sq mi or 247 acres) and river estuaries.

Le Mesnil-Herman (French pronunciation: [lə menil ɛʁmɑ̃]) is a former commune in the Manche department in Normandy in north-western France. On 1 January 2019, it was merged into the commune Bourgvallées.

== See also ==
- Communes of the Manche department
