= Saint-Samson-de-Bonfossé =

- Part of Bourgvallées
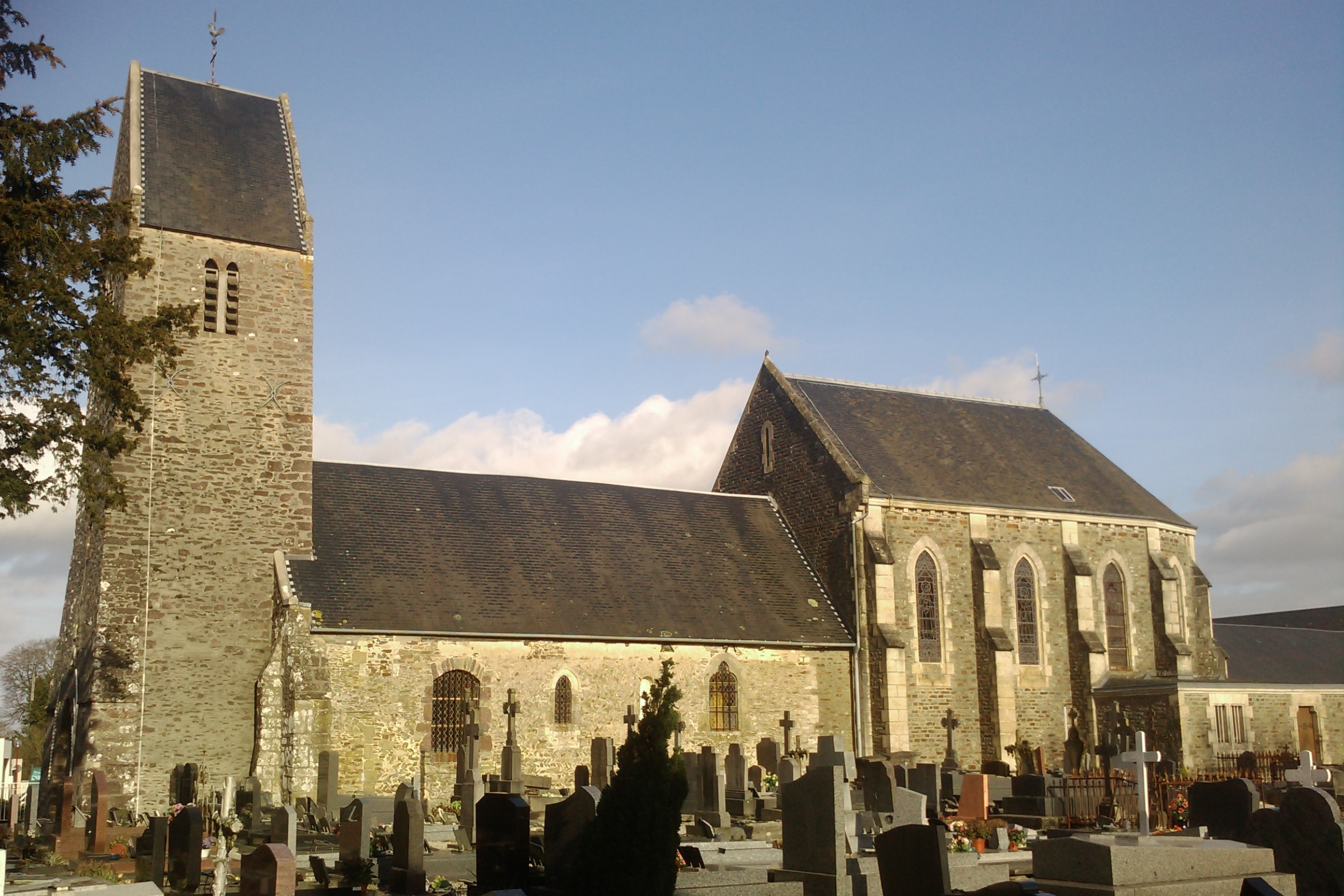
- The church of Saint-Samson
- Location of Saint-Samson-de-Bonfossé
- Location within France Location within Normandy
- Coordinates: 49°02′59″N 1°07′39″W
- Country: France
- Region: Normandy
- Department: Manche
- Arrondissement: Saint-Lô
- Canton: Saint-Lô-2
- Commune: Bourgvallées
- Area^{1}: 6.28 km^{2} (2.42 sq mi)
- Elevation: 105 m (344 ft)
- Highest elevation: 159 m (522 ft)
- Lowest elevation: 28 m (92 ft)
- Population (2022): 935
  - Density: 149/km^{2} (386/sq mi)
- Time zone: UTC+01:00 (CET)
  - Summer (DST): UTC+02:00 (CEST)
- Postal code: 50750
- ^{1} French Land Register data, which excludes lakes, ponds, glaciers > 1 km^{2} (0.386 sq mi or 247 acres) and river estuaries.

Saint-Samson-de-Bonfossé (French pronunciation: [sɛ̃ sɑ̃sɔ̃ də bɔ̃fose]) is a former commune in the Manche department in Normandy in north-western France. On 1 January 2016, it was merged into the new commune of Bourgvallées.

== See also ==
- Communes of the Manche department
