= La Mancellière-sur-Vire =

- Part of Bourgvallées
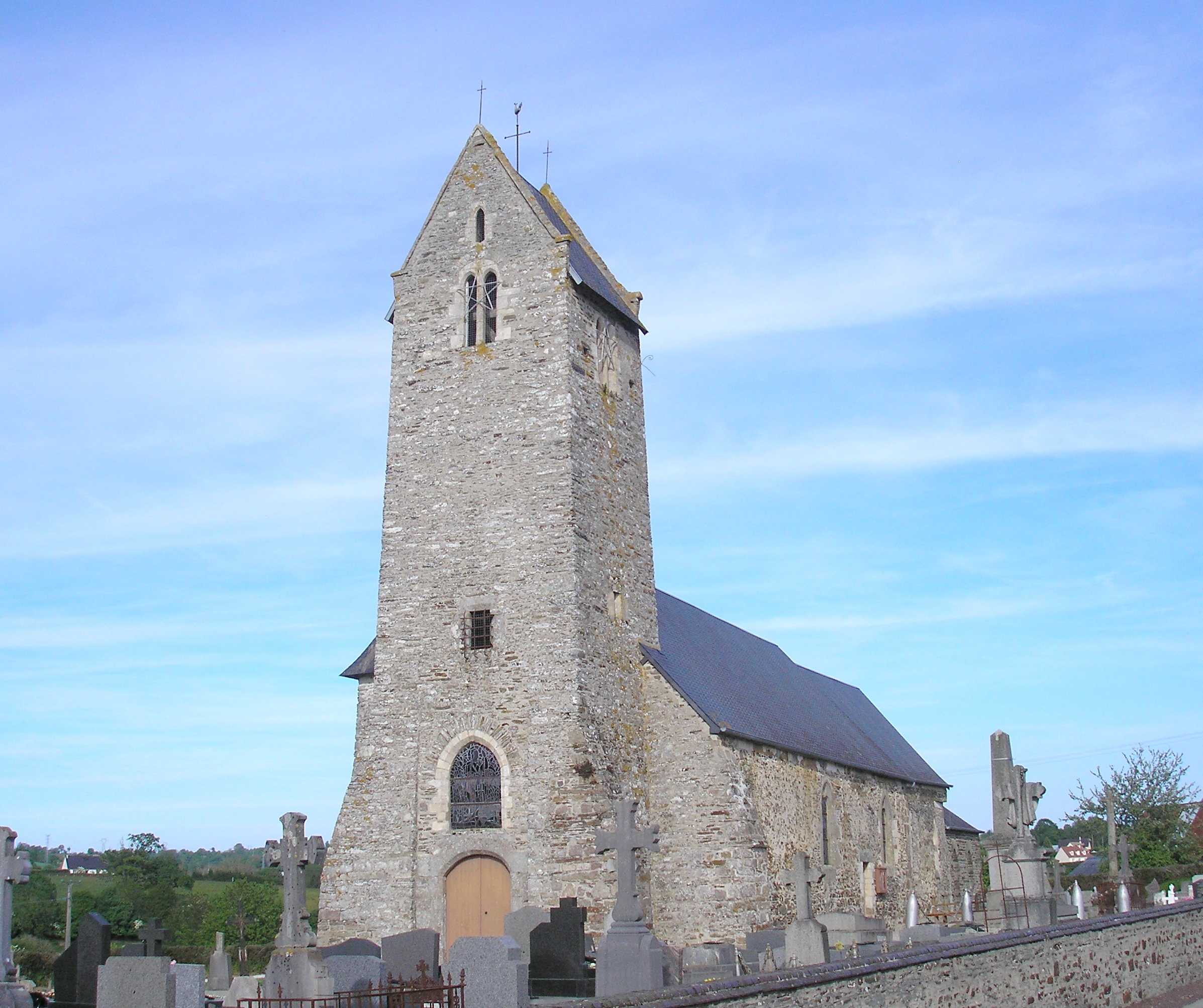
- The church of Saint-Jean-Baptiste
- Location of La Mancellière-sur-Vire
- Location within France Location within Normandy
- Coordinates: 49°04′11″N 1°04′09″W
- Country: France
- Region: Normandy
- Department: Manche
- Arrondissement: Saint-Lô
- Canton: Saint-Lô-2
- Commune: Bourgvallées
- Area^{1}: 6.8 km^{2} (2.6 sq mi)
- Elevation: 50 m (160 ft)
- Highest elevation: 109 m (358 ft)
- Lowest elevation: 17 m (56 ft)
- Population (2022): 548
  - Density: 81/km^{2} (210/sq mi)
- Time zone: UTC+01:00 (CET)
  - Summer (DST): UTC+02:00 (CEST)
- Postal code: 50750
- ^{1} French Land Register data, which excludes lakes, ponds, glaciers > 1 km^{2} (0.386 sq mi or 247 acres) and river estuaries.

La Mancellière-sur-Vire (French pronunciation: [la mɑ̃s(ə)ljɛʁ syʁ viʁ]) is a former commune in the Manche department in Normandy in north-western France. On 1 January 2016, it was merged into the new commune of Bourgvallées. Its population was 548 in 2022.

== See also ==
- Communes of the Manche department
