= Simonot =

Simonot (English: /sɪməˈnoʊ/, French: [ʃɑ̃tal simɔno]) is a French surname, derived from Simmonds. Notable people with the surname include:

- Chantal Simonot, member of the European Parliament
- Renée Simonot (1911–2021), French actress
