= Saint-Ébremond-de-Bonfossé =

- Part of Canisy
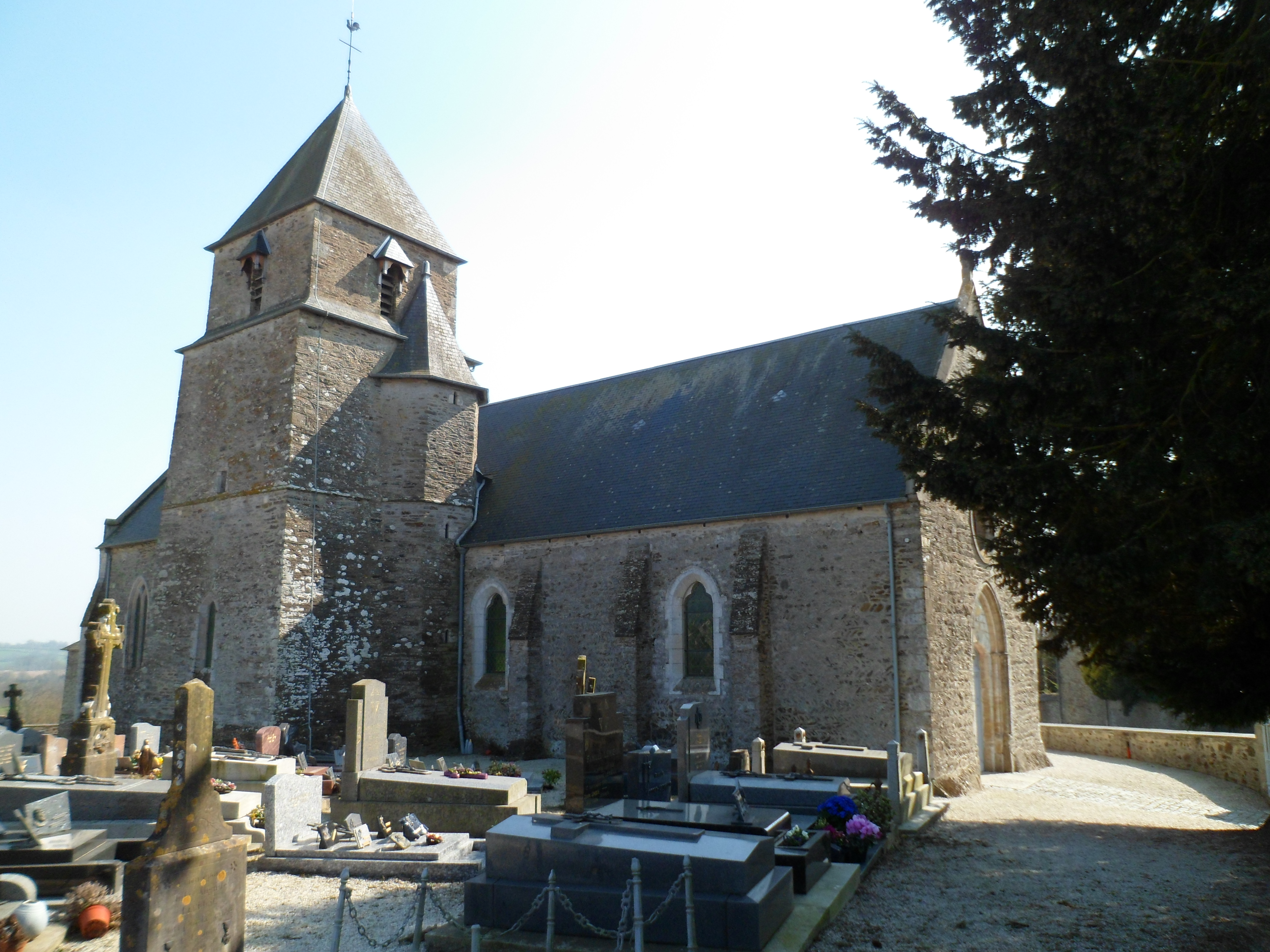
- The church of Saint Ébremond
- Location of Saint-Ébremond-de-Bonfossé
- Location within France Location within Normandy
- Coordinates: 49°04′03″N 1°08′54″W
- Country: France
- Region: Normandy
- Department: Manche
- Arrondissement: Saint-Lô
- Canton: Saint-Lô-2
- Commune: Canisy
- Area^{1}: 11.9 km^{2} (4.6 sq mi)
- Elevation: 100 m (330 ft)
- Highest elevation: 115 m (377 ft)
- Lowest elevation: 12 m (39 ft)
- Population (2022): 700
  - Density: 59/km^{2} (150/sq mi)
- Time zone: UTC+01:00 (CET)
  - Summer (DST): UTC+02:00 (CEST)
- Postal code: 50750
- ^{1} French Land Register data, which excludes lakes, ponds, glaciers > 1 km^{2} (0.386 sq mi or 247 acres) and river estuaries.

Saint-Ébremond-de-Bonfossé (French pronunciation: [sɛ̃.t‿ebʁəmɔ̃ də bɔ̃fose]) is a former commune in the Manche department in Normandy in north-western France. On 1 January 2017, it was merged into the commune Canisy. Its population was 700 in 2022.

== See also ==
- Communes of the Manche department
