= Saint-Romphaire =

- Part of Bourgvallées
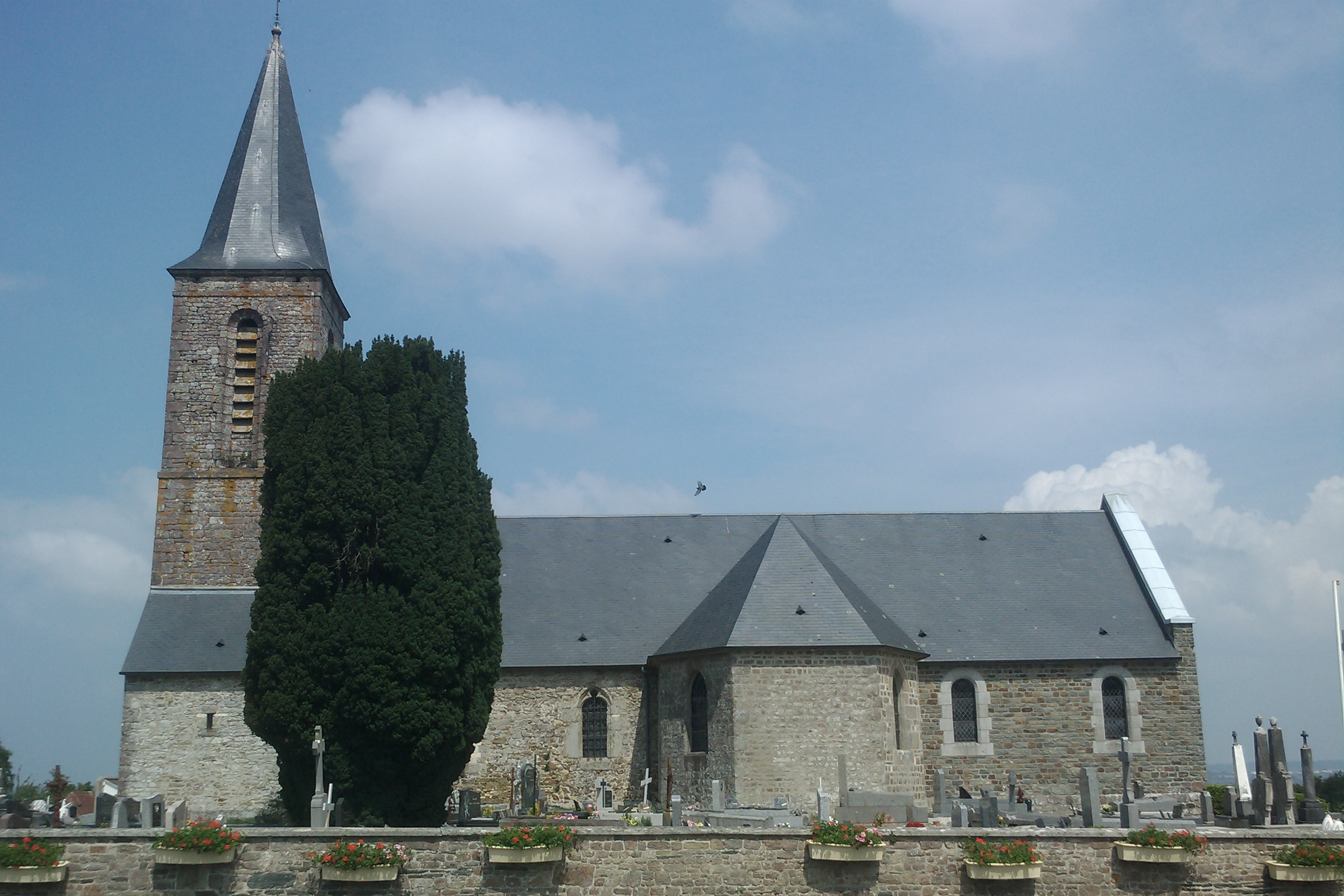
- Location of Saint-Romphaire
- Location within France Location within Normandy
- Coordinates: 49°02′23″N 1°06′16″W
- Country: France
- Region: Normandy
- Department: Manche
- Arrondissement: Saint-Lô
- Canton: Saint-Lô-2
- Commune: Bourgvallées
- Area^{1}: 9.97 km^{2} (3.85 sq mi)
- Elevation: 150 m (490 ft)
- Highest elevation: 155 m (509 ft)
- Lowest elevation: 18 m (59 ft)
- Population (2022): 771
  - Density: 77.3/km^{2} (200/sq mi)
- Time zone: UTC+01:00 (CET)
  - Summer (DST): UTC+02:00 (CEST)
- Postal code: 50750
- ^{1} French Land Register data, which excludes lakes, ponds, glaciers > 1 km^{2} (0.386 sq mi or 247 acres) and river estuaries.

Saint-Romphaire (French pronunciation: [sɛ̃ ʁɔ̃fɛʁ]) is a former commune in the Manche department in Normandy in north-western France. On 1 January 2016, it was merged into the new commune of Bourgvallées. Its population was 771 in 2022.

It is named after the 6th-century Saint Romphaire of Coutances.

== See also ==
- Communes of the Manche department
