= Quibou =

- Commune
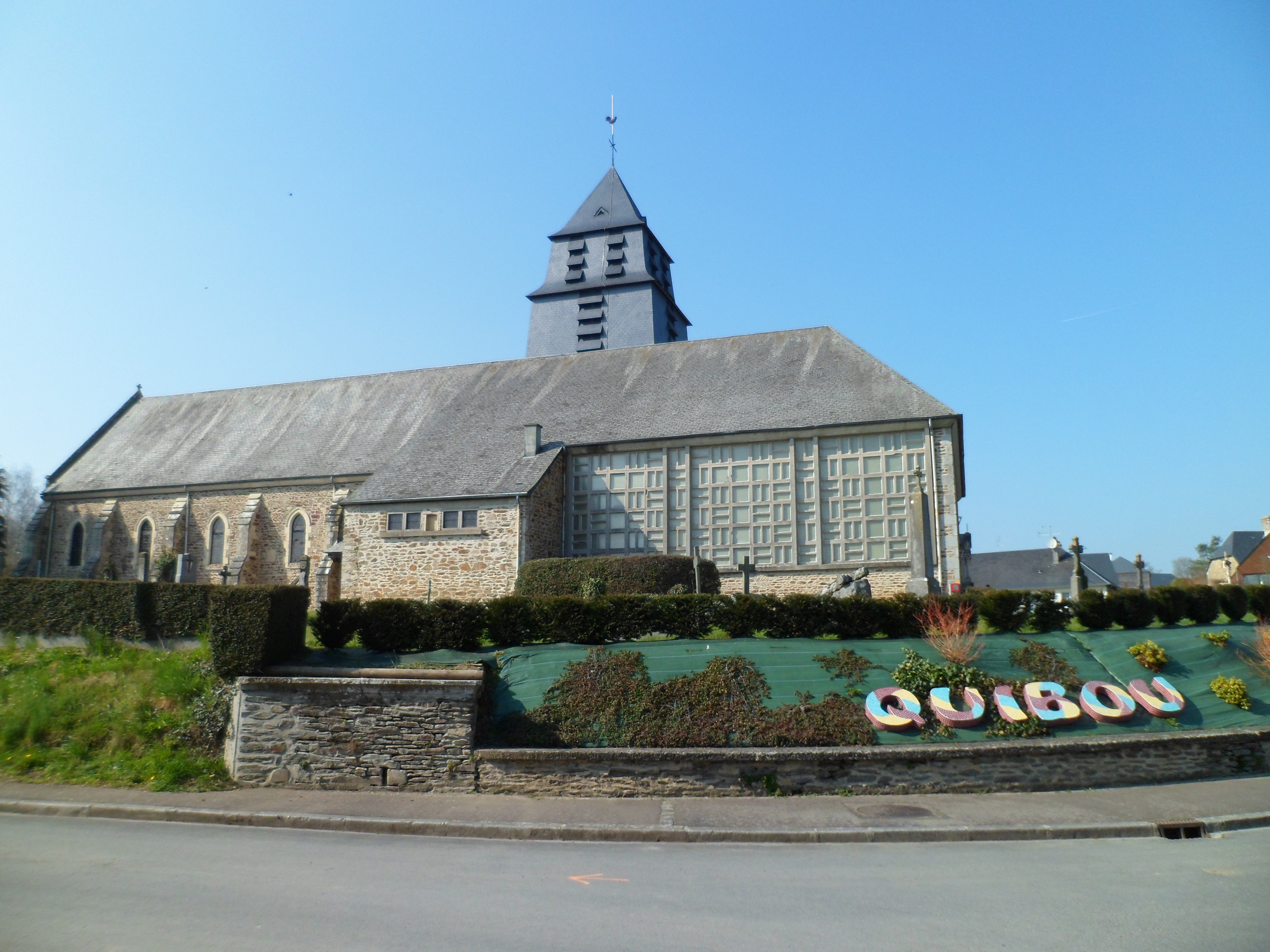
- The church of Saint-Rémi
- Location of Quibou
- Location within France Location within Normandy
- Coordinates: 49°04′08″N 1°11′56″W
- Country: France
- Region: Normandy
- Department: Manche
- Arrondissement: Saint-Lô
- Canton: Saint-Lô-2
- Intercommunality: Saint-Lô Agglo

Government
  - Mayor (2020–2026): Roland Courteille
- Area^{1}: 17.15 km^{2} (6.62 sq mi)
- Highest elevation: 114 m (374 ft)
- Lowest elevation: 46 m (151 ft)
- Population (2023): 858
  - Density: 50.0/km^{2} (130/sq mi)
- Time zone: UTC+01:00 (CET)
  - Summer (DST): UTC+02:00 (CEST)
- INSEE/Postal code: 50420 /50750
- ^{1} French Land Register data, which excludes lakes, ponds, glaciers > 1 km^{2} (0.386 sq mi or 247 acres) and river estuaries.

Quibou (French pronunciation: [kibu]) is a commune in the Manche department in north-western France.

== Geography ==
Quibou is located near to the village of Canisy.

== See also ==
- Communes of the Manche department
