= Dangy =

- Commune
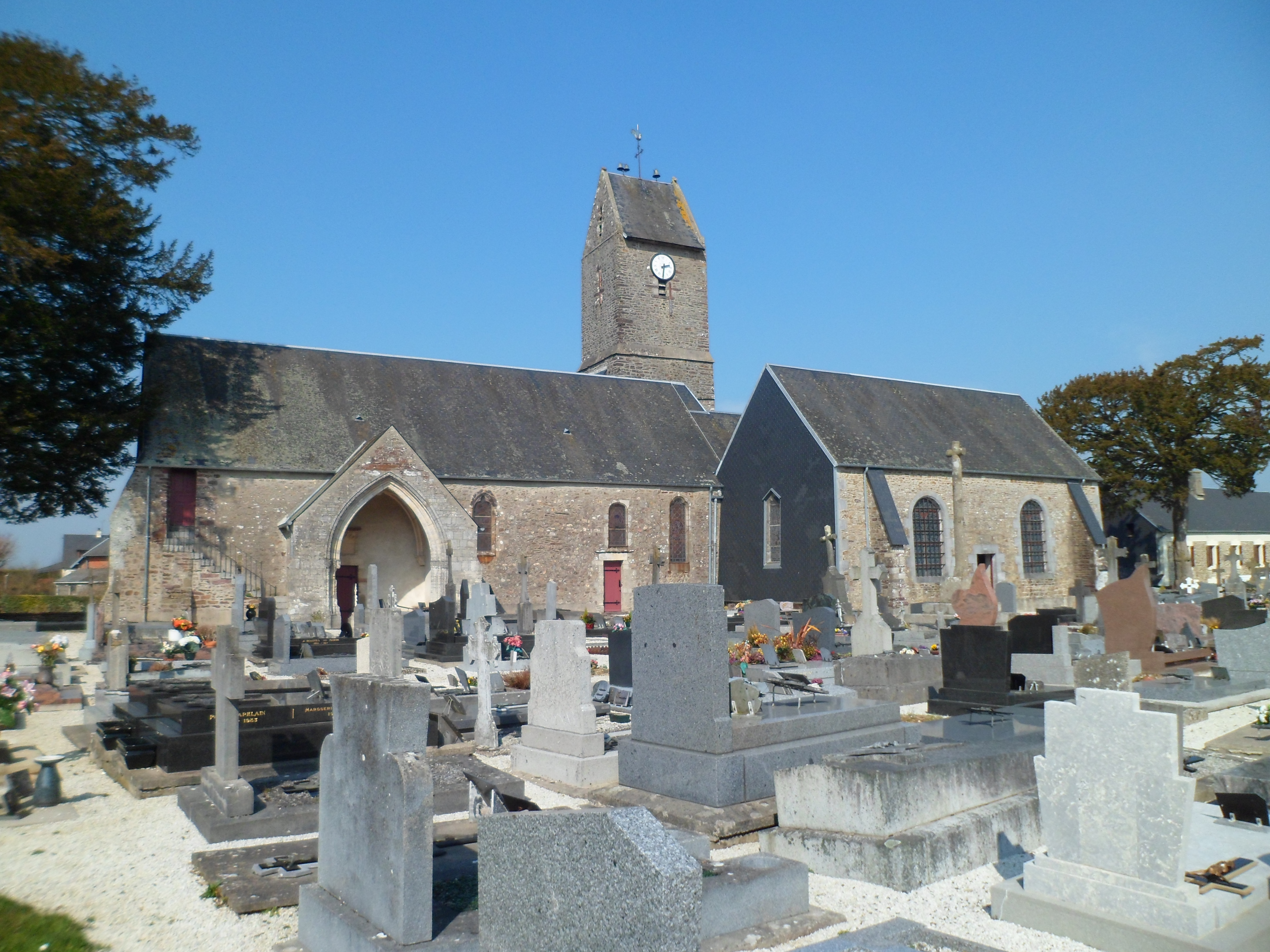
- The church of Saint-Martin
- Location of Dangy
- Location within France Location within Normandy
- Coordinates: 49°02′45″N 1°13′24″W
- Country: France
- Region: Normandy
- Department: Manche
- Arrondissement: Saint-Lô
- Canton: Saint-Lô-2
- Intercommunality: Saint-Lô Agglo

Government
  - Mayor (2020–2026): Dominique Pain
- Area^{1}: 9.93 km^{2} (3.83 sq mi)
- Elevation: 115 m (377 ft)
- Highest elevation: 161 m (528 ft)
- Lowest elevation: 70 m (230 ft)
- Population (2023): 648
  - Density: 65.3/km^{2} (169/sq mi)
- Demonym: Dangyais
- Time zone: UTC+01:00 (CET)
  - Summer (DST): UTC+02:00 (CEST)
- INSEE/Postal code: 50159 /50750
- ^{1} French Land Register data, which excludes lakes, ponds, glaciers > 1 km^{2} (0.386 sq mi or 247 acres) and river estuaries.

Dangy (French pronunciation: [dɑ̃ʒi]) is a commune in the Manche department in north-western France.

== See also ==
- Communes of the Manche department
