= Gourfaleur =

- Part of Bourgvallées
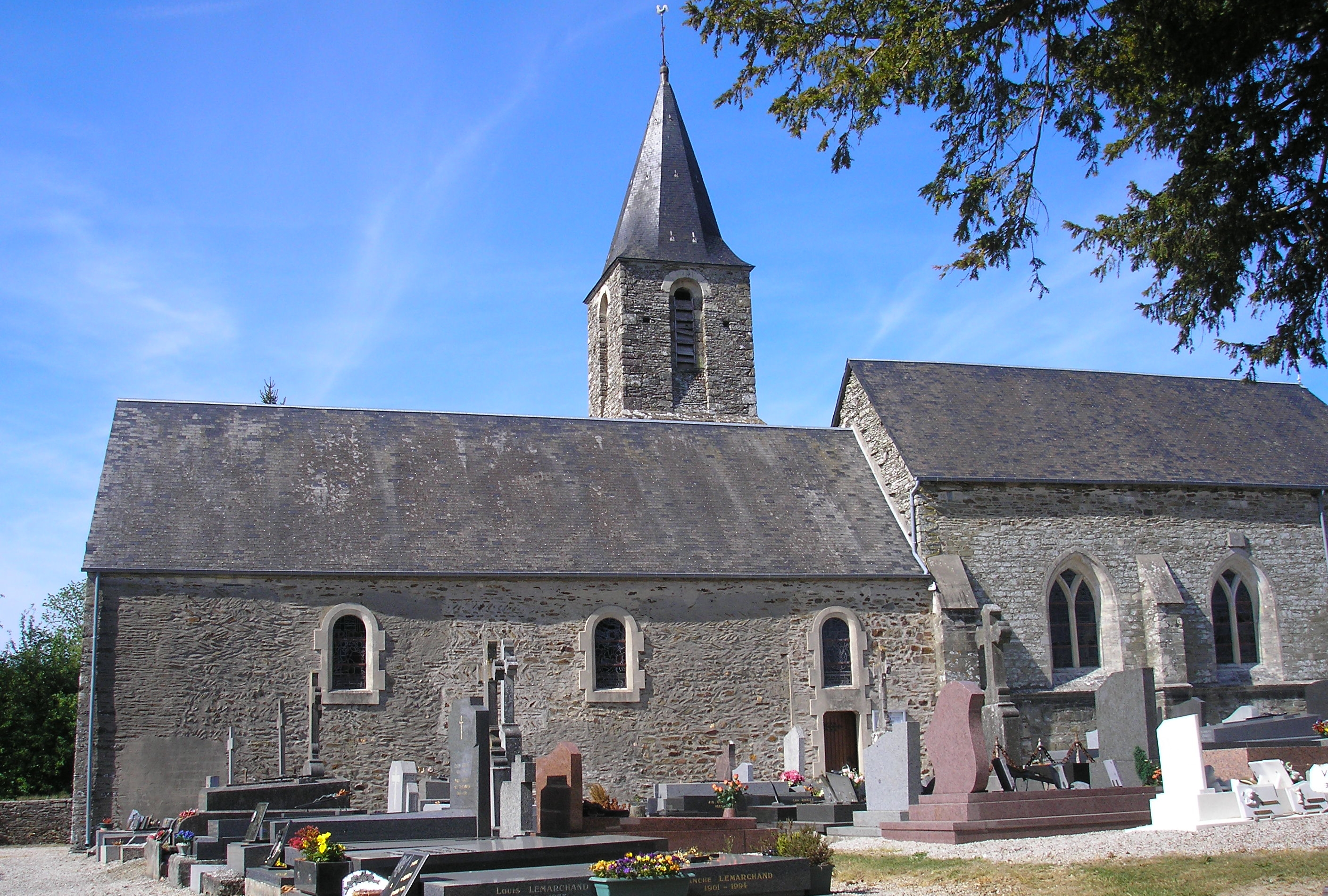
- The church of Notre-Dame
- Location of Gourfaleur
- Location within France Location within Normandy
- Coordinates: 49°05′01″N 1°06′39″W
- Country: France
- Region: Normandy
- Department: Manche
- Arrondissement: Saint-Lô
- Canton: Saint-Lô-2
- Commune: Bourgvallées
- Area^{1}: 8.45 km^{2} (3.26 sq mi)
- Elevation: 20 m (66 ft)
- Highest elevation: 100 m (330 ft)
- Lowest elevation: 12 m (39 ft)
- Population (2022): 461
  - Density: 54.6/km^{2} (141/sq mi)
- Demonym: Gourfaleurais
- Time zone: UTC+01:00 (CET)
  - Summer (DST): UTC+02:00 (CEST)
- Postal code: 50750
- ^{1} French Land Register data, which excludes lakes, ponds, glaciers > 1 km^{2} (0.386 sq mi or 247 acres) and river estuaries.

Gourfaleur (French pronunciation: [ɡuʁfalœʁ]) is a former commune in the Manche department in north-western France. On 1 January 2016, it was merged into the new commune of Bourgvallées.

== See also ==
- Communes of the Manche department
