= Bourgvallées =

- Commune
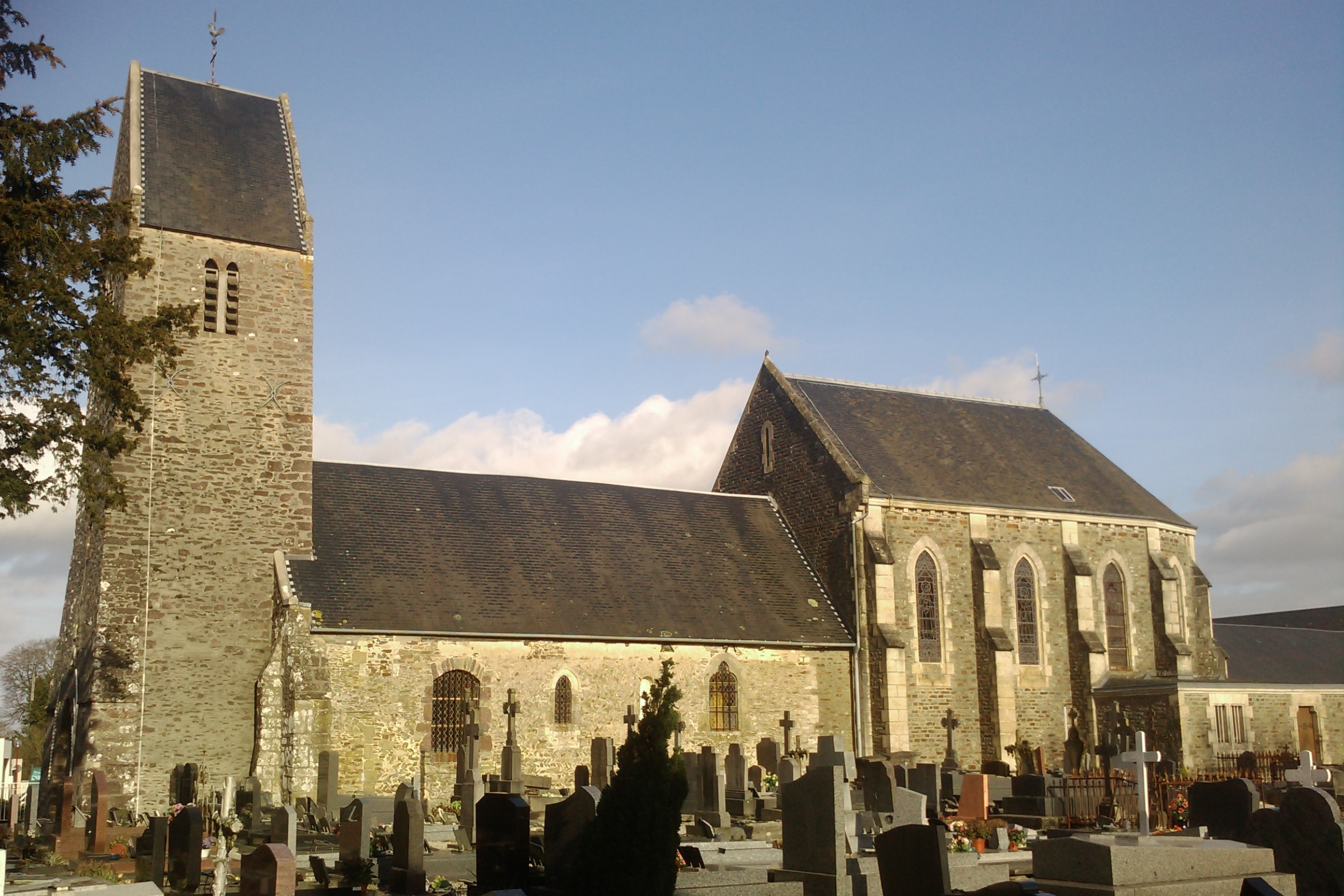
- The church in Saint-Samson-de-Bonfossé
- Location of Bourgvallées
- Location within France Location within Normandy
- Coordinates: 49°02′56″N 1°07′41″W
- Country: France
- Region: Normandy
- Department: Manche
- Arrondissement: Saint-Lô
- Canton: Saint-Lô-2
- Intercommunality: Saint-Lô Agglo
- Area^{1}: 48.27 km^{2} (18.64 sq mi)
- Highest elevation: 180 m (590 ft)
- Lowest elevation: 12 m (39 ft)
- Population (2023): 3,326
  - Density: 68.90/km^{2} (178.5/sq mi)
- Time zone: UTC+01:00 (CET)
  - Summer (DST): UTC+02:00 (CEST)
- INSEE/Postal code: 50546 /50750
- ^{1} French Land Register data, which excludes lakes, ponds, glaciers > 1 km^{2} (0.386 sq mi or 247 acres) and river estuaries.

Bourgvallées (French pronunciation: [buʁvale]) is a commune in the department of Manche, northwestern France. The municipality was established on 1 January 2016 by merger of the former communes of Gourfaleur, La Mancellière-sur-Vire, Saint-Romphaire and Saint-Samson-de-Bonfossé (the seat). On 1 January 2019, the former communes Le Mesnil-Herman and Soulles were merged into Bourgvallées.

== Population ==
Population data refer to the area corresponding with the commune as of January 2025.

Historical population
Year	Pop.	±% p.a.
1968	2,638	—
1975	2,441	−1.10%
1982	2,685	+1.37%
1990	2,829	+0.66%
1999	2,759	−0.28%
2007	3,080	+1.39%
2012	3,240	+1.02%
2017	3,213	−0.17%
2023	3,326	+0.58%
Source: INSEE

== See also ==
- Communes of the Manche department
