= Baudre =

- Commune
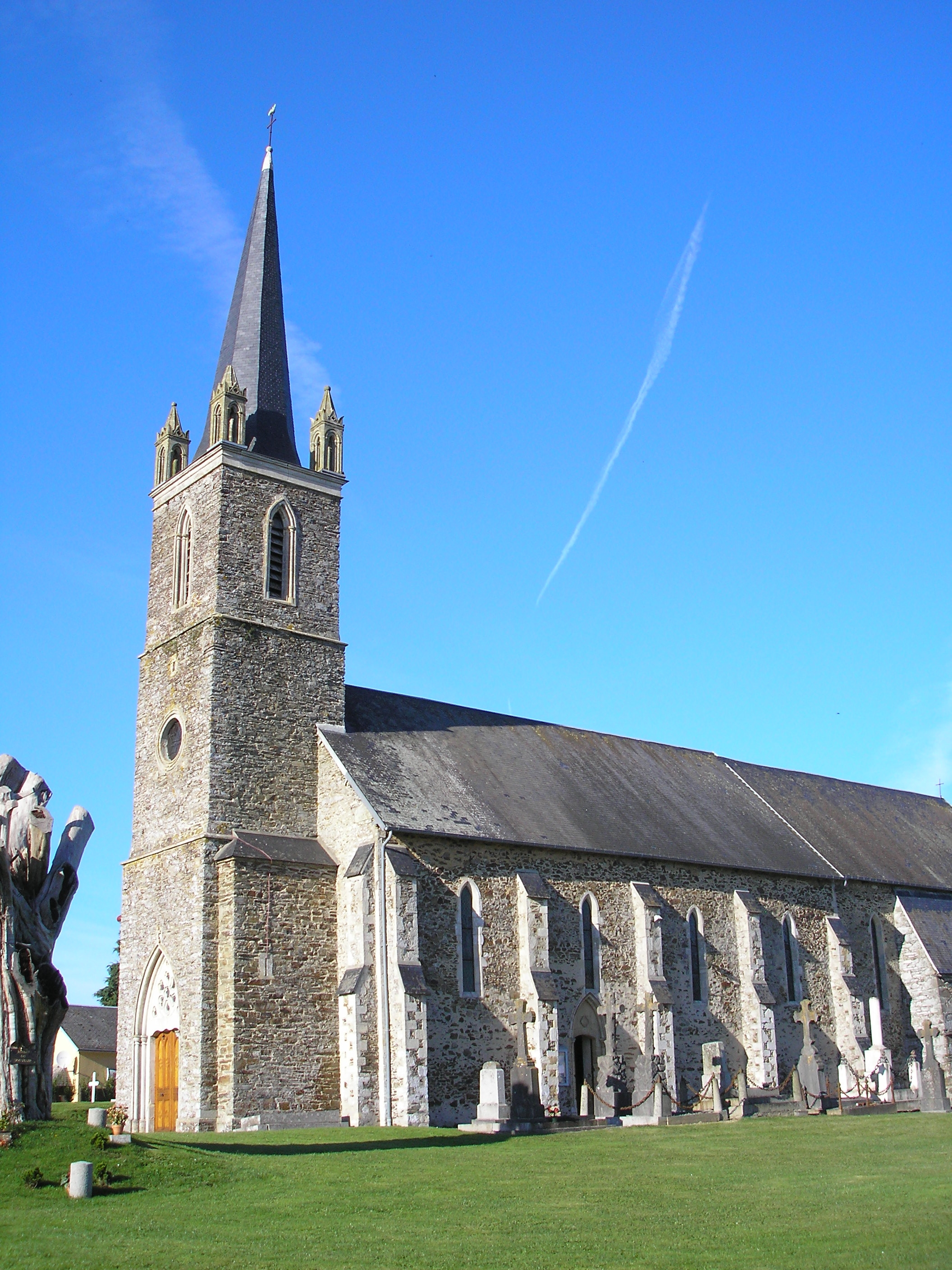
- Church of Saint Ouen
- Location of Baudre
- Location within France Location within Normandy
- Coordinates: 49°05′24″N 1°04′19″W
- Country: France
- Region: Normandy
- Department: Manche
- Arrondissement: Saint-Lô
- Canton: Saint-Lô-2
- Intercommunality: Saint-Lô Agglo

Government
  - Mayor (2020–2026): Daniel Joret
- Area^{1}: 3.81 km^{2} (1.47 sq mi)
- Elevation: 70 m (230 ft)
- Highest elevation: 93 m (305 ft)
- Lowest elevation: 14 m (46 ft)
- Population (2023): 613
  - Density: 161/km^{2} (417/sq mi)
- Time zone: UTC+01:00 (CET)
  - Summer (DST): UTC+02:00 (CEST)
- INSEE/Postal code: 50034 /50000
- ^{1} French Land Register data, which excludes lakes, ponds, glaciers > 1 km^{2} (0.386 sq mi or 247 acres) and river estuaries.

Baudre (French pronunciation: [bodʁ]) is a commune in the Manche department in the Normandy region in northwestern France.

== Population ==
Historical population
Year	Pop.	±% p.a.
1968	247	—
1975	295	+2.57%
1982	371	+3.33%
1990	365	−0.20%
1999	356	−0.28%
2007	475	+3.67%
2012	533	+2.33%
2017	539	+0.22%
2023	613	+2.17%
Source: INSEE

== See also ==
- Communes of the Manche department
