= La Barre-de-Semilly =

- Commune
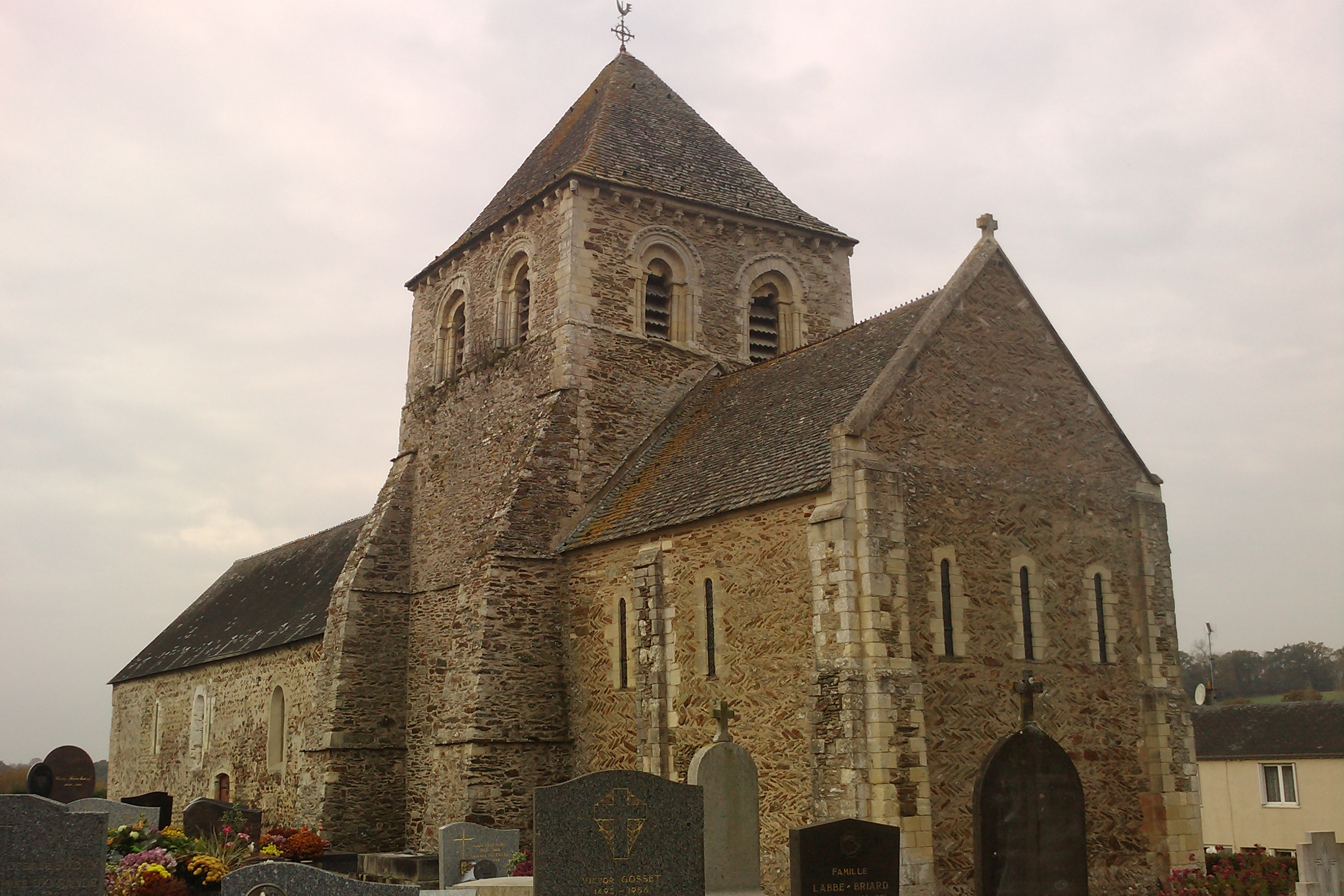
- Saint-Ébremond church
- Location of La Barre-de-Semilly
- Location within France Location within Normandy
- Coordinates: 49°06′43″N 1°01′59″W
- Country: France
- Region: Normandy
- Department: Manche
- Arrondissement: Saint-Lô
- Canton: Saint-Lô-2
- Intercommunality: Saint-Lô Agglo

Government
  - Mayor (2024–2026): Jean-Pierre Le Bihan
- Area^{1}: 7.74 km^{2} (2.99 sq mi)
- Elevation: 155 m (509 ft)
- Highest elevation: 166 m (545 ft)
- Lowest elevation: 48 m (157 ft)
- Population (2023): 1,029
  - Density: 133/km^{2} (344/sq mi)
- Time zone: UTC+01:00 (CET)
  - Summer (DST): UTC+02:00 (CEST)
- INSEE/Postal code: 50032 /50810
- ^{1} French Land Register data, which excludes lakes, ponds, glaciers > 1 km^{2} (0.386 sq mi or 247 acres) and river estuaries.

La Barre-de-Semilly (French pronunciation: [la baʁ də səmiji]) is a commune in the Manche department in the Normandy region in northwestern France.

== Population ==
Historical population
Year	Pop.	±% p.a.
1968	403	—
1975	513	+3.51%
1982	621	+2.77%
1990	656	+0.69%
1999	792	+2.12%
2007	932	+2.06%
2012	990	+1.21%
2017	1,000	+0.20%
2023	1,029	+0.48%
Source: INSEE

== See also ==
- Communes of the Manche department
