= Saint-Martin-de-Bonfossé =

- Commune
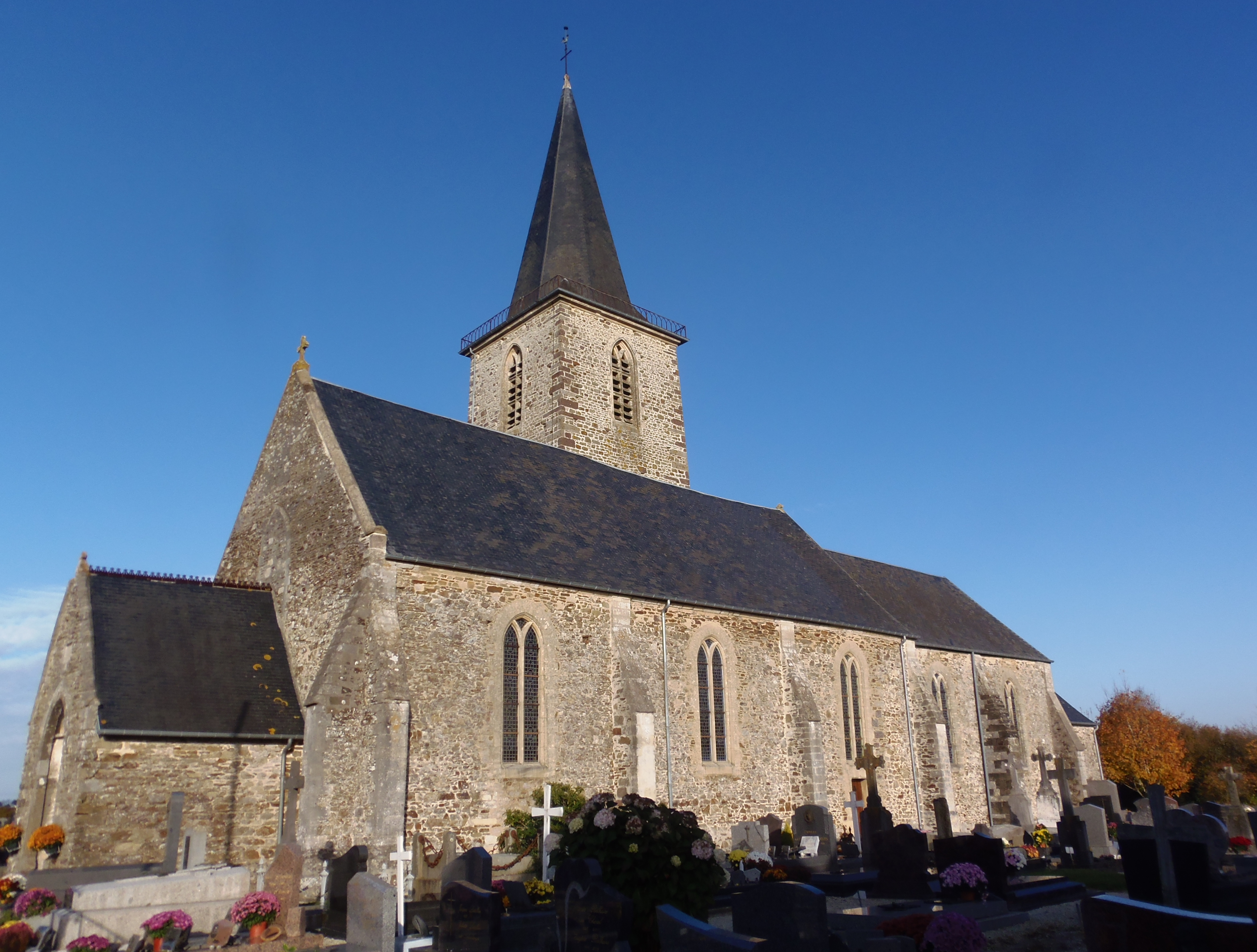
- The church of Saint-Martin
- Location of Saint-Martin-de-Bonfossé
- Location within France Location within Normandy
- Coordinates: 49°03′15″N 1°10′07″W
- Country: France
- Region: Normandy
- Department: Manche
- Arrondissement: Saint-Lô
- Canton: Saint-Lô-2
- Intercommunality: Saint-Lô Agglo

Government
  - Mayor (2020–2026): Jean Paul Payrastre
- Area^{1}: 12.68 km^{2} (4.90 sq mi)
- Elevation: 105 m (344 ft)
- Highest elevation: 168 m (551 ft)
- Lowest elevation: 64 m (210 ft)
- Population (2023): 530
  - Density: 42/km^{2} (110/sq mi)
- Time zone: UTC+01:00 (CET)
  - Summer (DST): UTC+02:00 (CEST)
- INSEE/Postal code: 50512 /50750
- ^{1} French Land Register data, which excludes lakes, ponds, glaciers > 1 km^{2} (0.386 sq mi or 247 acres) and river estuaries.

Saint-Martin-de-Bonfossé (French pronunciation: [sɛ̃ maʁtɛ̃ də bɔ̃fose]) is a commune in the Manche department in Normandy in north-western France.

== See also ==
- Communes of the Manche department
