= Carantilly =

- Commune
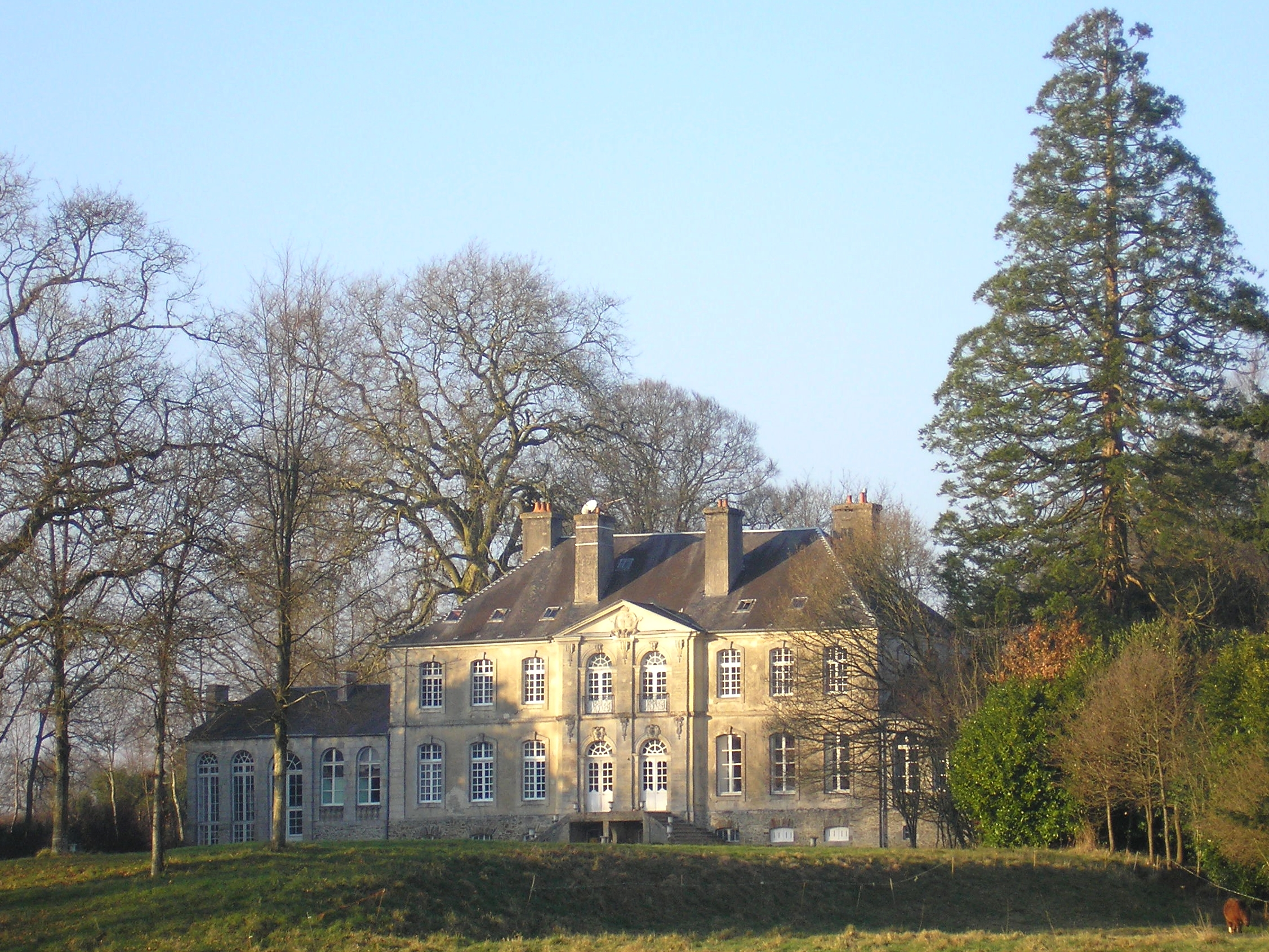
- Carantilly castle
- Location of Carantilly
- Location within France Location within Normandy
- Coordinates: 49°03′58″N 1°14′20″W
- Country: France
- Region: Normandy
- Department: Manche
- Arrondissement: Saint-Lô
- Canton: Saint-Lô-2
- Intercommunality: Saint-Lô Agglo

Government
  - Mayor (2020–2026): Bruno Coron
- Area^{1}: 10.70 km^{2} (4.13 sq mi)
- Elevation: 92 m (302 ft)
- Highest elevation: 119 m (390 ft)
- Lowest elevation: 67 m (220 ft)
- Population (2023): 619
  - Density: 57.9/km^{2} (150/sq mi)
- Time zone: UTC+01:00 (CET)
  - Summer (DST): UTC+02:00 (CEST)
- INSEE/Postal code: 50098 /50570
- ^{1} French Land Register data, which excludes lakes, ponds, glaciers > 1 km^{2} (0.386 sq mi or 247 acres) and river estuaries.

Carantilly (French pronunciation: [kaʁɑ̃tiji]) is a commune in the Manche department in Normandy in north-western France.

== See also ==
- Communes of the Manche department
