= The Lion and the Mouse (painting) =

Painting by Peter Paul Rubens and Frans Snyders

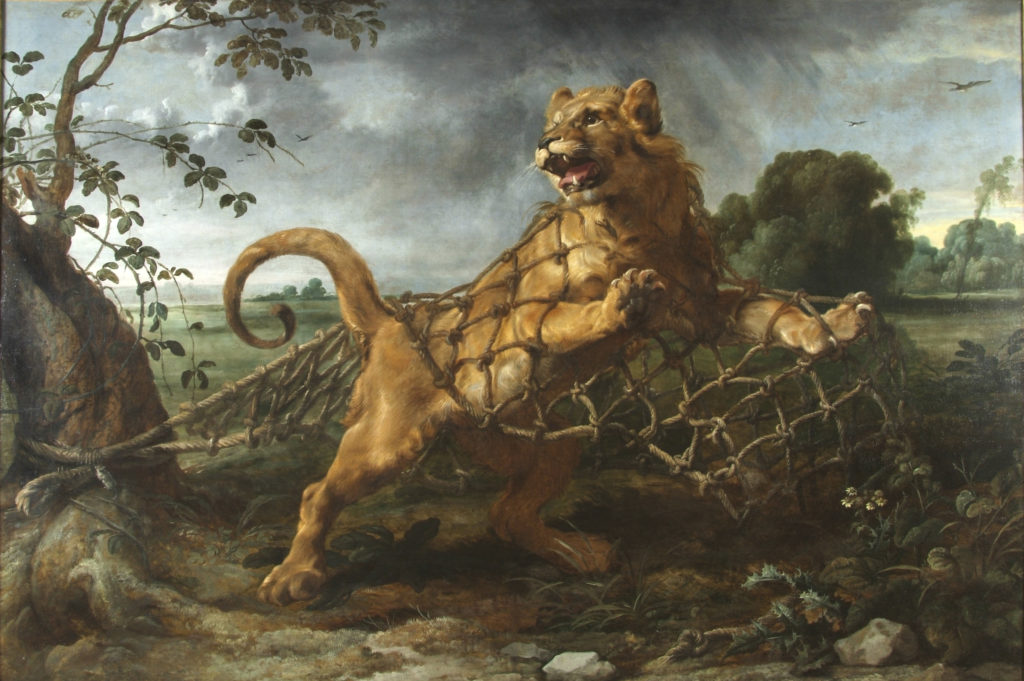
- Artist: Peter Paul Rubens, Frans Snyders
- Completion date: between 1600 and 1657
- Medium: Oil on canvas
- Subject: The Lion and the Mouse by Aesop
- Location: Saint Lô, Normandy, France
- Owner: Château de Canisy

The Lion and the Mouse is a painting by Peter Paul Rubens and Frans Snyders, based on a scene from the fable by Aesop.

== Background ==
As was common in 17th century Antwerp, Rubens collaborated with his close friend Snyders, who was esteemed for his mastery in painting animals. While Rubens was proficient in depicting animals, as evidenced by his work Daniel in the Lions' Den, he occasionally sought Snyders' expertise for specific elements in his paintings.

This artwork illustrates a scene from Aesop's fable, where a mouse gnaws at a hunter's net to free a captured lion. The story highlights themes of kindness and reciprocity, as the lion had previously shown mercy to the mouse, which now returns the favour.

The artists made multiple copies of the painting. The original hangs at the Château de Canisy, with a copy hanging in the library at Chequers.

== Connection to Winston Churchill ==
The copy at Chequers was a gift from Lord Lee of Fareham to the English state following World War I. It was here that Winston Churchill, himself an avid painter, encountered the painting.

A widespread story purports that Churchill was frustrated by the lack of visibility of the mouse in the painting. He supposedly climbed a step ladder and repainted the rodent to enhance its clarity.

For the later prime minister Harold Wilson, the story was instructive of Churchill's personality, writing that "it takes a confident and authoritative prime minister to decide to touch up a Rubens", but lamenting that no evidence of the deed exists, perhaps due to cleaning work done on the painting before being loaned to Churchill College.

Though Churchill is known to have 'fixed' at least one painting at Lake Como in 1945, his biographer Martin Gilbert doubts the fixing of The Lion and the Mouse occurred, writing that "Churchill was surely too great an art lover to ‘touch up’ a Rubens".
