= Sainte-Suzanne-sur-Vire =

- Commune
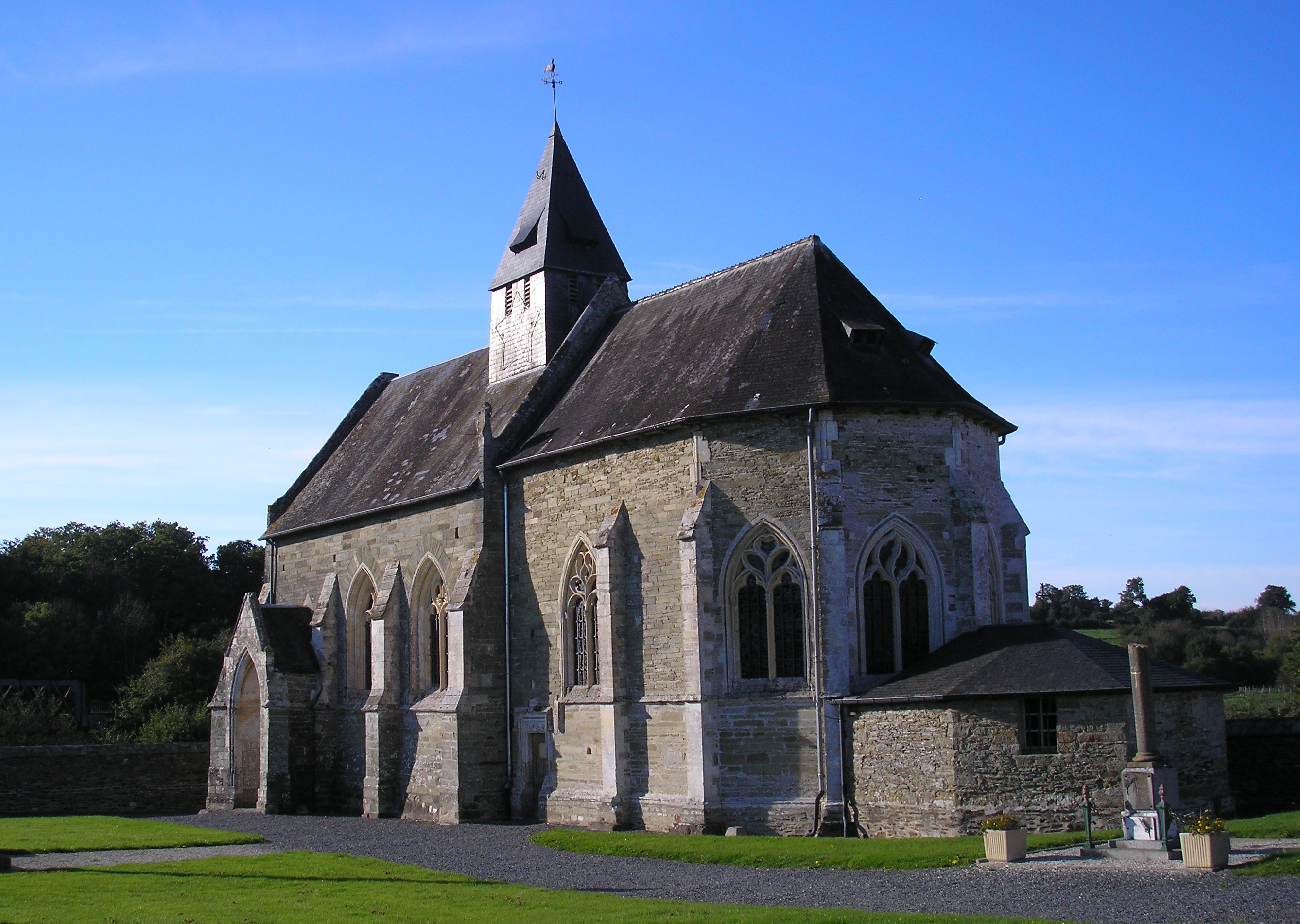
- The church
- Location of Sainte-Suzanne-sur-Vire
- Location within France Location within Normandy
- Coordinates: 49°03′46″N 1°03′30″W
- Country: France
- Region: Normandy
- Department: Manche
- Arrondissement: Saint-Lô
- Canton: Saint-Lô-2
- Intercommunality: Saint-Lô Agglo

Government
  - Mayor (2020–2026): Antoine Aubry
- Area^{1}: 5.05 km^{2} (1.95 sq mi)
- Elevation: 63 m (207 ft)
- Highest elevation: 110 m (360 ft)
- Lowest elevation: 17 m (56 ft)
- Population (2023): 685
  - Density: 136/km^{2} (351/sq mi)
- Time zone: UTC+01:00 (CET)
  - Summer (DST): UTC+02:00 (CEST)
- INSEE/Postal code: 50556 /50750
- ^{1} French Land Register data, which excludes lakes, ponds, glaciers > 1 km^{2} (0.386 sq mi or 247 acres) and river estuaries.

Sainte-Suzanne-sur-Vire (French pronunciation: [sɛ̃t syzan syʁ viʁ], literally Sainte-Suzanne on Vire) is a commune in the Manche department in Normandy in north-western France.

== See also ==
- Communes of the Manche department
