= The Lion and the Mouse =

Aesop's fable

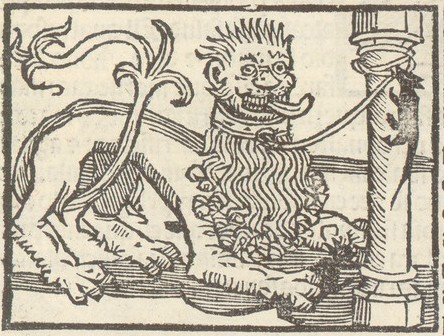
Woodcut showing two scenes from the fable in the Ysopu hystoriado, Seville 1521

The Lion and the Mouse is one of Aesop's Fables, numbered 150 in the Perry Index. There are also Eastern variants of the story, all of which demonstrate mutual dependence regardless of size or status. In the Renaissance the fable was provided with a sequel condemning social ambition.

== The fable in literature ==
In the oldest versions, a lion threatens a mouse that wakes it from sleep. The mouse begs forgiveness and makes the point that such unworthy prey would bring the lion no honour. The lion agrees and sets the mouse free. Later, the lion is netted by hunters. Hearing it roaring, the mouse remembers its clemency and frees it by gnawing through the ropes. The moral of the story is that mercy brings its reward and that there is no being so small that it cannot help a greater. Later English versions reinforce this by having the mouse promise to return the lion's favor, to its sceptical amusement.

The Scottish poet Robert Henryson, in a version he included in his Morall Fabillis in the 1480s, expands the plea that the mouse makes and introduces serious themes of law, justice and politics. The poem consists of 43 seven-lined stanzas of which the first twelve recount a meeting with Aesop in a dream and six stanzas at the end draw the moral; the expanded fable itself occupies stanzas 13–36. A political lesson of a different kind occurs in Francis Barlow's 1687 edition of the fables. There the poet Aphra Behn comments that no form of service is to be despised, for just as the humble mouse had aided the king of the beasts, so 'An Oak did once a glorious Monarch save' by serving as a hiding place when King Charles II was escaping after the battle of Worcester.

The 16th-century French poet Clément Marot also recounts an expanded version of the fable in the course of his Épitre à son ami Lyon Jamet (Letter to his friend Lyon Jamet), first published in 1534. This is an imitation of the Latin poet Horace's Epistles, addressed to friends and often applying Aesopian themes to their situations. In this case, Marot has been imprisoned and begs Jamet to help him get released, playing on his friend's forename and styling himself the lowly rat (rather than mouse). La Fontaine's Fables included a more succinct version of the story (II.11) in the following century.

In Ivan Krylov's version (1833), the mouse, instead of disturbing the lion, requests permission to make a house upon his territory, stating it might one day prove useful in return. Resentful of the idea that a creature so pitiful might provide him a service, the lion angrily tells the mouse to flee while he's still alive. Only in the cage does the lion come to realize that his own pride was his downfall.

== Artistic interpretations ==
The fable has been a favourite with artists and sculptors. The Flemish painters Peter Paul Rubens and Frans Snyders were responsible for at least two paintings of the scene. One of these used to hang in the Great Hall at Chequers, the country house of the British prime minister, and was supposedly retouched by Winston Churchill so as to highlight the barely visible mouse, though the veracity of the story is in doubt.

The fable was also the subject of a painting by the French artist Vincent Chevilliard (1841–1904) and exhibited at the Paris Salon of 1881. The Austrian artist Gustav Klimt incorporated a reference to the beginning of the story on the left hand side of his painting "The Fable" in 1883. There a lion sleeps beneath a shrub, on the leafless twigs of which mice are at play.

Sculptors turned to the fable in the 20th century. One of them was the maker of church furniture, Robert (Mouseman) Thompson, who came by his name for incorporating a mouse into most of his carvings. He did this legitimately in the Church of Our Lady and St Michael in Workington, Cumbria, where the underside of one of the seats in the choir stalls, installed in 1926, depicts the fable of the lion and the mouse.

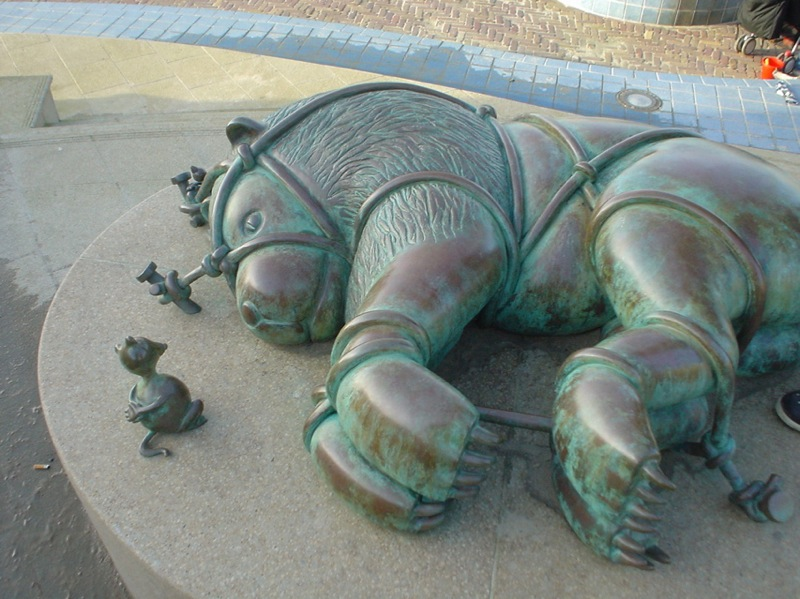
Sculpture by Tom Otterness at the Beelden aan Zee museum

A Marshall Fredericks statue of 1957 seeks to make the lion less threatening to children. The sculpture was commissioned for the Eastland Center in Harper Woods, Michigan. The lion is carved from limestone and has a large round head with stylized, uniformly coiled ringlets. Reclining on its back, it grins at the little mouse perched on its paw. This was cast from gilt bronze and gold plated, which led to its being stolen numerous times. One was returned 50 years after its theft and exhibited at the Detroit Historical Museum in 2007. A copy of the whole statue is on exhibition in the sculpture garden of the Marshall M. Fredericks Sculpture Museum.

Another American sculptor, Tom Otterness, has made the fable the subject of an equally child-friendly sculpture among the 23 he installed on the outdoor terrace of the seaside Beelden aan Zee museum in Scheveningen, The Netherlands, in 2004. In this the lion is lying trussed up on its side, contemplated by the mouse that stands upright with its hands clasped behind its back. A similar piece of public art by German sculptor Peter Fritzsche (b. 1938) is in Eisenhüttenstadt. His lion lies on its back with its legs bound and is perched on a plinth round the sides of which is carved a translation of Ivan Krylov's version of the fable. This dates the work back to the days of the Communist administration.

Among French musical settings of La Fontaine's version of the fable, Le lion et le rat, have been Jacques Magner's of 1886 and that of 1905 by Jacques Soulacroix (1863-1937). Other treatments of different versions have included Mabel Wood Hill's in her Aesop's Fables Interpreted Through Music (New York, 1920) for high voice and piano and Werner Egk's Der Löwe und die Maus for small orchestra and children's choir, performed in 1931. The fable was also included in Edward Hughes' Songs from Aesop's fables for children's voices and piano (1965), as the second of Anthony Plog's set for narrator, piano and horn (1989/93) and among the fables set by Yvonne Gillespie for narrator and full orchestra (2001). In addition, Julie Giroux made it the first movement in her A Symphony of Fables (2006) and David Edgar Walther included it in his 2009 opera cycle Aesop's Fables. In 2012 it was one of the ten on David P. Shortland's Australian recording, Aesop Go HipHop, where the sung chorus after the hip hop narration advised against discrimination: "Little friends are great friends, don't think short or tall".

== Popular applications ==
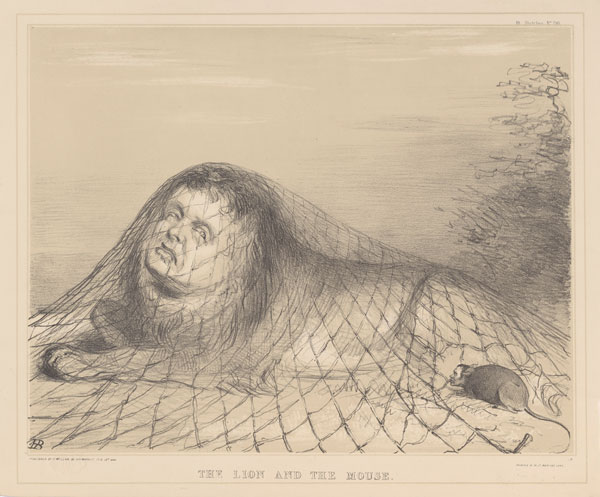
Lithograph in black pencil on cream-coloured background by John Doyle (artist), 1844

Illustrations of the fable have appeared on domestic objects, including a Chelsea plate in 1755 and a tile in the Minton Aesop's Fables series during the 1880s. In 1990 it was to be used on one of a set of four Zambian stamps featuring folk tales.

In 19th century Britain the political cartoonist John Doyle adapted the fable to one of his monthly series of prints in February 1844. In it the mouse nibbling at the net is Earl Russell, who prevailed on the House of Lords to free the leonine Daniel O'Connell from the imprisonment he had incurred for trying to repeal the Irish Act Of Union. In the United States the fable was applied to a case of corrupt lobbying in a Puck cartoon for 23 July 1913. Under the title 'Even a rat may help free a lion', the House of Representatives is shown enmeshed in the nets of "Lobbyism", from which Colonel (Martin) Mulhall is about to free it by his revelations of bribe-taking.

In 1953 the fable was adapted to a two-minute animated cartoon ending with an advertisement for Coca-Cola as a promoter of friendship. The National Film Board of Canada (NFB) twice adapted the story. As The Bear and the Mouse it was issued as a short feature film in 1966 using real animals with voice-over. 10 years later the animated short The Lion and the Mouse appeared, directed by Evelyn Lambart and with an original score by Maurice Blackburn.

Though the fable is frequently a subject of children's literature, Jerry Pinkney's The Lion & the Mouse (2009) tells it through pictures alone, without the usual text of such books, and won the 2010 Caldecott Medal for its illustrations. The story is updated and adapted to fit the conditions of the Serengeti National Park, in which it is set.

== The anti-fable ==
The Neo-Latin fabulist Laurentius Abstemius provided a sequel to the story with an opposite social message in his Hecatomythium (1499). In this the lion promises the mouse any reward it cares to name after setting him free. The mouse asks for the lion's daughter in marriage, but the bride steps on her husband by accident on the marriage night. Where Aesop's fable teaches that no-one should be despised, however low in the social scale, this reinterpretation suggests that one should not try to rise out of one's class through marriage. A later verse treatment by Hieronymus Osius is followed by the same moral. In England, both the Francis Barlow (1687) and Roger L'Estrange (1692) collections include both versions of the fable, as does Samuel Croxall (1721). He, however, reads into the story a lesson on lack of judgment.

The story that Abstemius could have had in mind when inventing his fable of an unequal marriage ridiculously terminated occurs in the Hebrew Bible. Amaziah, king of the lesser power of Judah, sent a challenge to Jehoash, king of Israel, who replied with a dismissive fable:

'A thistle in Lebanon sent to a cedar in Lebanon, saying, Give your daughter to my son for a wife, and a wild beast of Lebanon passed by and trampled down the thistle'. (2 Kings 14.9; repeated in 2 Chronicles 25.18, English Standard Version)

The characters are different there, but the core of the story about the end of presumptuous ambition remains the same.

== Eastern versions ==
The fable is introduced as an illustration into a longer Egyptian myth in a papyrus of indeterminate date towards the start of the Common Era. A lion previously unacquainted with man comes across examples of his cruelty and exploitation of other animals and decides to hunt him down. On his way the lion spares a mouse that comes beneath his paw and it promises to return the favour. This the mouse does by gnawing the lion free when he is netted in a trap set by man. In general the evidence points to the tale being adapted from a Greek source. There was a long established Greek trading colony in Egypt and the document appeared during the reign of the Ptolemaic dynasty, which was of Greek origin itself.

There is also an Indian variant of the story in the Panchatantra, but that is told of mice and elephants. Here too it is introduced into a larger context, in this case a discussion about appropriate friendship, and illustrates the advice 'Make friends, however strong or weak they be'. An elephant herd inadvertently tramples a tribe of mice, who send representatives to beg the elephant king to avoid their settlement in future. Later the herd is trapped and the grateful mice come to their rescue and free them. When the story was carried to China by Buddhist monks, the benefitted animal reverted to a tiger, another member of the cat family.

== See also ==
- Androcles
- The Lion and the Mouse (painting)
