= Chantal Simonot =

French politician

Chantal Simonot (French: [ʃɑ̃tal simɔno]) was a Front National Member of the European Parliament for the north-west of France. Simonot resigned on 1 October 2004 and was replaced by Fernand Le Rachinel on 22 October.
