= Canisy =

- Commune
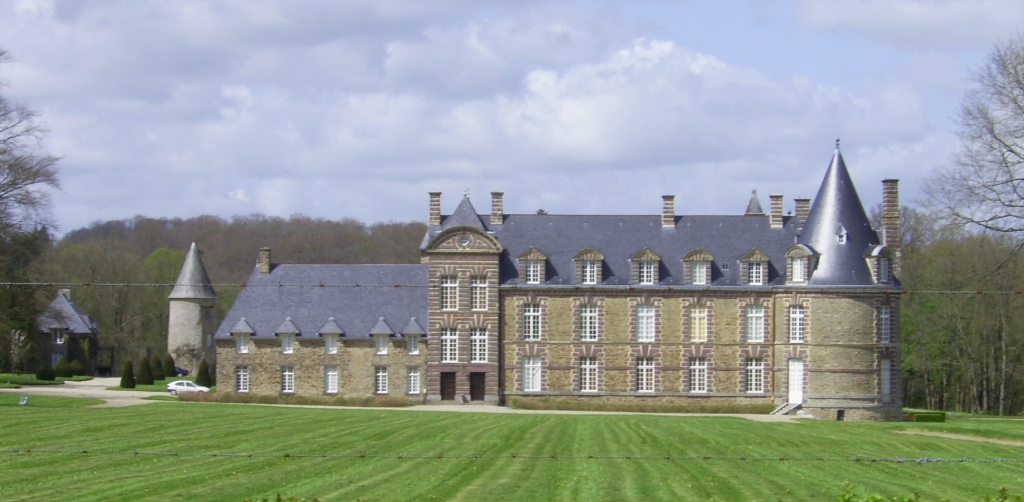
- The château de Canisy
- Location of Canisy
- Location within France Location within Normandy
- Coordinates: 49°04′37″N 1°10′28″W
- Country: France
- Region: Normandy
- Department: Manche
- Arrondissement: Saint-Lô
- Canton: Saint-Lô-2
- Intercommunality: Saint-Lô Agglo

Government
  - Mayor (2020–2026): Jean-Marie Lebehot
- Area^{1}: 18.15 km^{2} (7.01 sq mi)
- Elevation: 62 m (203 ft)
- Highest elevation: 116 m (381 ft)
- Lowest elevation: 39 m (128 ft)
- Population (2023): 1,707
  - Density: 94.05/km^{2} (243.6/sq mi)
- Time zone: UTC+01:00 (CET)
  - Summer (DST): UTC+02:00 (CEST)
- INSEE/Postal code: 50095 /50750
- ^{1} French Land Register data, which excludes lakes, ponds, glaciers > 1 km^{2} (0.386 sq mi or 247 acres) and river estuaries.

Canisy (French pronunciation: [kanizi]) is a commune in the Manche department in Normandy in north-western France. On 1 January 2017, the former commune of Saint-Ébremond-de-Bonfossé was merged into Canisy.

== Heraldry ==
Arms of Canisy	The arms of Canisy are blazoned : Vairy Or and gules, on a bend azure, a millrind between 2 horse-brays Or. The Vairy Or and gules is from the arms of the de Kergorlay family, former lords of Canisy and still owners of the castle.

== See also ==
- Communes of the Manche department
- Chateau de Canisy
