= Canton of Saint-Lô-2 =

Coordinates: 49.12°N 1.08°W

The canton of Saint-Lô-2 is an administrative division of the Manche department, northwestern France. It was created at the French canton reorganisation which came into effect in March 2015. Its seat is in Saint-Lô.

It consists of the following communes:

1. La Barre-de-Semilly
2. Baudre
3. Bourgvallées
4. Canisy
5. Carantilly
6. Dangy
7. La Luzerne
8. Quibou
9. Sainte-Suzanne-sur-Vire
10. Saint-Lô (partly)
11. Saint-Martin-de-Bonfossé
