= Sainte-Marie-du-Mont, Manche =

Sainte-Marie-du-Mont
- Commune
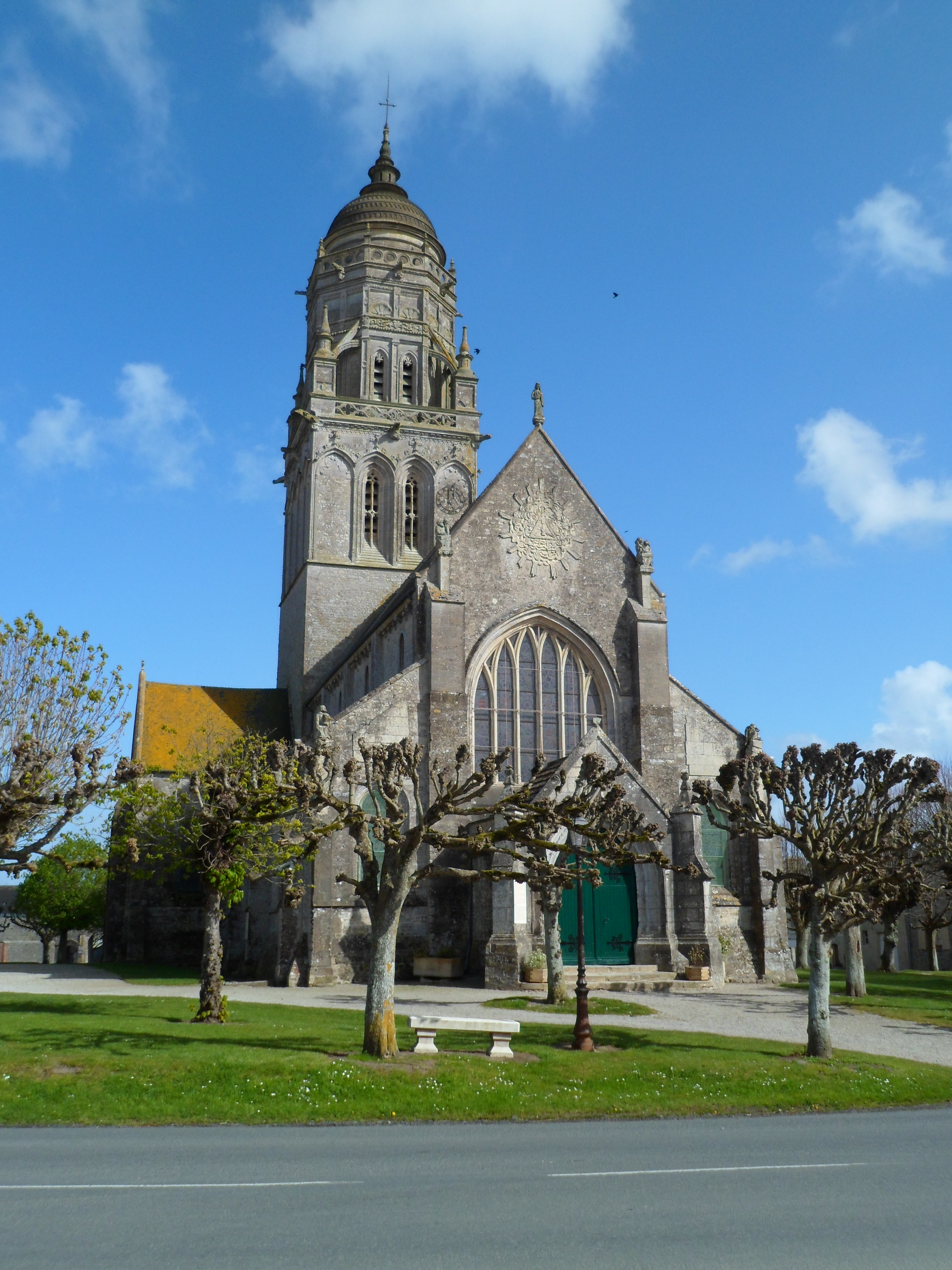
- The church of Notre-Dame in Sainte-Marie-du-Mont

- Coat of arms
- Location of Sainte-Marie-du-Mont
- Location within France Location within Normandy
- Coordinates: 49°22′45″N 1°13′30″W
- Country: France
- Region: Normandy
- Department: Manche
- Arrondissement: Cherbourg
- Canton: Carentan-les-Marais

Government
  - Mayor (2020–2026): Charles de Vallavieille
- Area^{1}: 26.98 km^{2} (10.42 sq mi)
- Elevation: 34 m (112 ft)
- Population (2023): 685
  - Density: 25.4/km^{2} (65.8/sq mi)
- Time zone: UTC+01:00 (CET)
  - Summer (DST): UTC+02:00 (CEST)
- INSEE/Postal code: 50509 /50480
- ^{1} French Land Register data, which excludes lakes, ponds, glaciers > 1 km^{2} (0.386 sq mi or 247 acres) and river estuaries.

Sainte-Marie-du-Mont (French pronunciation: [sɛ̃t maʁi dy mɔ̃]) is a commune in the Manche department and in the region of Normandy in north-western France. In 2023 the commune had 685 inhabitants.

== Geography ==
Saint-Marie-du-Mont is located in the southeast of the Cotentin Peninsula, just north of the town of Carentan, and west of the Baie des Veys, the outlet of the Douve and the Vire.

The commune has a vast area in relation to neighbouring communes, it is bordered to the east by the English Channel, on the north by Audouville-la-Hubert, northwest by Turqueville, west by Bouteville, by Hiesville to the southwest and to the south by Brucheville and Brévands.

To the northeast of the commune is the national nature reserve of the Beauguillot domain, protecting part of the marshes of Cotentin and Bessin. The town is part of the natural regional park of the Marshes of Cotentin and of Bessin.

=== Climate ===
Sainte-Marie-du-Mont has an oceanic climate (Köppen climate classification Cfb). The average annual temperature in Sainte-Marie-du-Mont is 11.4 °C (52.5 °F). The average annual rainfall is 913.5 mm (35.96 in). December is the wettest month. The temperatures are highest on average in August, at around 17.3 °C (63.1 °F), and lowest in January, at around 6.2 °C (43.2 °F).

The highest temperature ever recorded in Sainte-Marie-du-Mont was 37.2 °C (99.0 °F) on 19 July 2016. The coldest temperature ever recorded was −8.3 °C (17.1 °F) on 10 January 2009.

Climate data for Sainte-Marie-du-Mont (1981–2010 averages, extremes 1997−present)
Month	Jan	Feb	Mar	Apr	May	Jun	Jul	Aug	Sep	Oct	Nov	Dec	Year
Record high °C (°F)	16.2 (61.2)	18.3 (64.9)	23.3 (73.9)	24.3 (75.7)	31.1 (88.0)	33.4 (92.1)	37.2 (99.0)	35.6 (96.1)	30.0 (86.0)	29.2 (84.6)	21.4 (70.5)	16.5 (61.7)	37.2 (99.0)
Mean daily maximum °C (°F)	8.9 (48.0)	9.6 (49.3)	11.4 (52.5)	13.7 (56.7)	16.4 (61.5)	19.4 (66.9)	21.2 (70.2)	21.7 (71.1)	19.8 (67.6)	16.5 (61.7)	12.4 (54.3)	9.2 (48.6)	15.0 (59.0)
Daily mean °C (°F)	6.2 (43.2)	6.5 (43.7)	8.0 (46.4)	9.8 (49.6)	12.8 (55.0)	15.4 (59.7)	17.1 (62.8)	17.3 (63.1)	15.6 (60.1)	12.8 (55.0)	9.2 (48.6)	6.3 (43.3)	11.4 (52.5)
Mean daily minimum °C (°F)	3.6 (38.5)	3.5 (38.3)	4.7 (40.5)	6.0 (42.8)	9.2 (48.6)	11.3 (52.3)	12.9 (55.2)	13.0 (55.4)	11.4 (52.5)	9.2 (48.6)	6.1 (43.0)	3.5 (38.3)	7.9 (46.2)
Record low °C (°F)	−8.3 (17.1)	−7.8 (18.0)	−4.3 (24.3)	−2.9 (26.8)	−0.7 (30.7)	3.1 (37.6)	4.9 (40.8)	4.6 (40.3)	2.7 (36.9)	−3.5 (25.7)	−6.1 (21.0)	−6.1 (21.0)	−8.3 (17.1)
Average precipitation mm (inches)	90.8 (3.57)	73.4 (2.89)	69.6 (2.74)	63.0 (2.48)	56.9 (2.24)	50.0 (1.97)	56.4 (2.22)	66.9 (2.63)	64.0 (2.52)	106.7 (4.20)	101.3 (3.99)	114.5 (4.51)	913.5 (35.96)
Average precipitation days (≥ 1.0 mm)	14.5	12.1	12.7	11.1	9.8	8.6	9.1	9.1	8.2	14.1	15.9	15.2	140.3
Source: Meteociel

== History ==
=== World War II ===
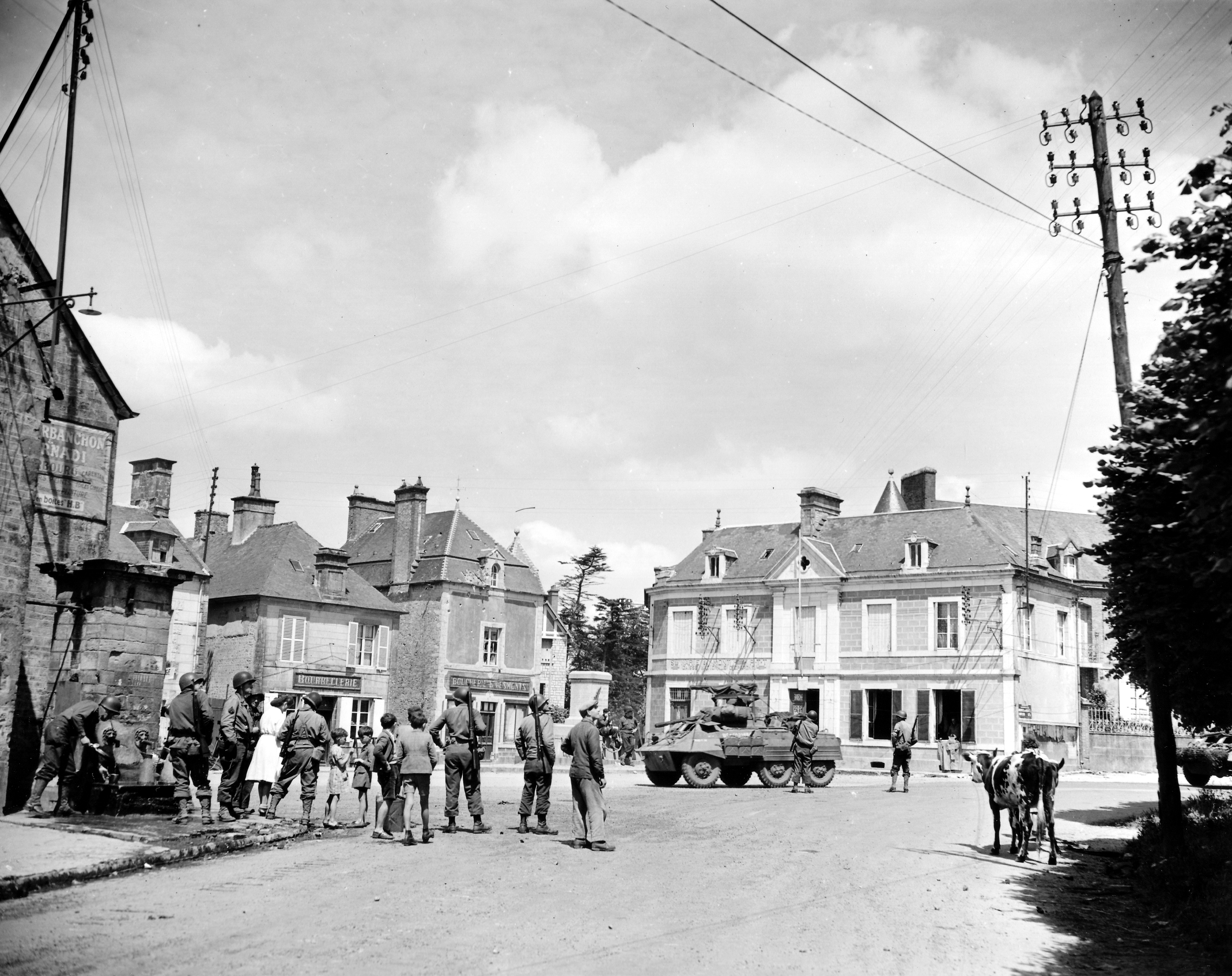
GIs talk with villagers on 12 June 1944

It is best known for being the scene of a military engagement between the American 101st Airborne Division and the German 91st Infantry Division on D-Day, 6 June 1944.

The village of Sainte-Marie-du-Mont was occupied by sixty German soldiers of the Artillerie-Regiment 191 (91. Infanterie Division). The Germans used the church tower as an observation post and on a clear day, they could see all the way to the sea. Far away from an expected invasion near Calais, they did not know the village was at the southern edge of D-Day's "drop zone c". After a heavy coastal bombardment by the Allies just after midnight on 6 June 1944, the first American paratroopers were dropped in dark early hours over occupied Normandy.

Plans were for troops of the 506th Parachute Infantry Regiment and the 3rd Battalion of the 501st Parachute Infantry Regiment of the 101st Airborne Division to land in "zone c". Here behind Utah Beach, they were responsible for clearing a route for thousands of soldiers arriving by sea from England.

A thick fog bank and heavy flak from coastal guns forced pilots away from their targets and left paratroopers in unknown territory, some facing enemy fire while still in the air. Just two-thirds of troops designated for zone c were accurately dropped. A number found themselves landing in and around Sainte-Marie-du-Mont and quickly fighting for their lives with the rather surprised Germans.

In the hamlet of La Madeleine, a monument in honour of the Danish sailors was erected. 800 of them took part in the logistics of landing on Allied ships.

== Heraldry ==
Arms of Sainte-Marie-du-Mont	The arms of Sainte-Marie-du-Mont are blazoned : Azure, in pale a drakkar and sword argent (the sail charged with a leopard gules), between 2 gussets Or each charged with a fleur de lys gules.

== Politics and administration ==
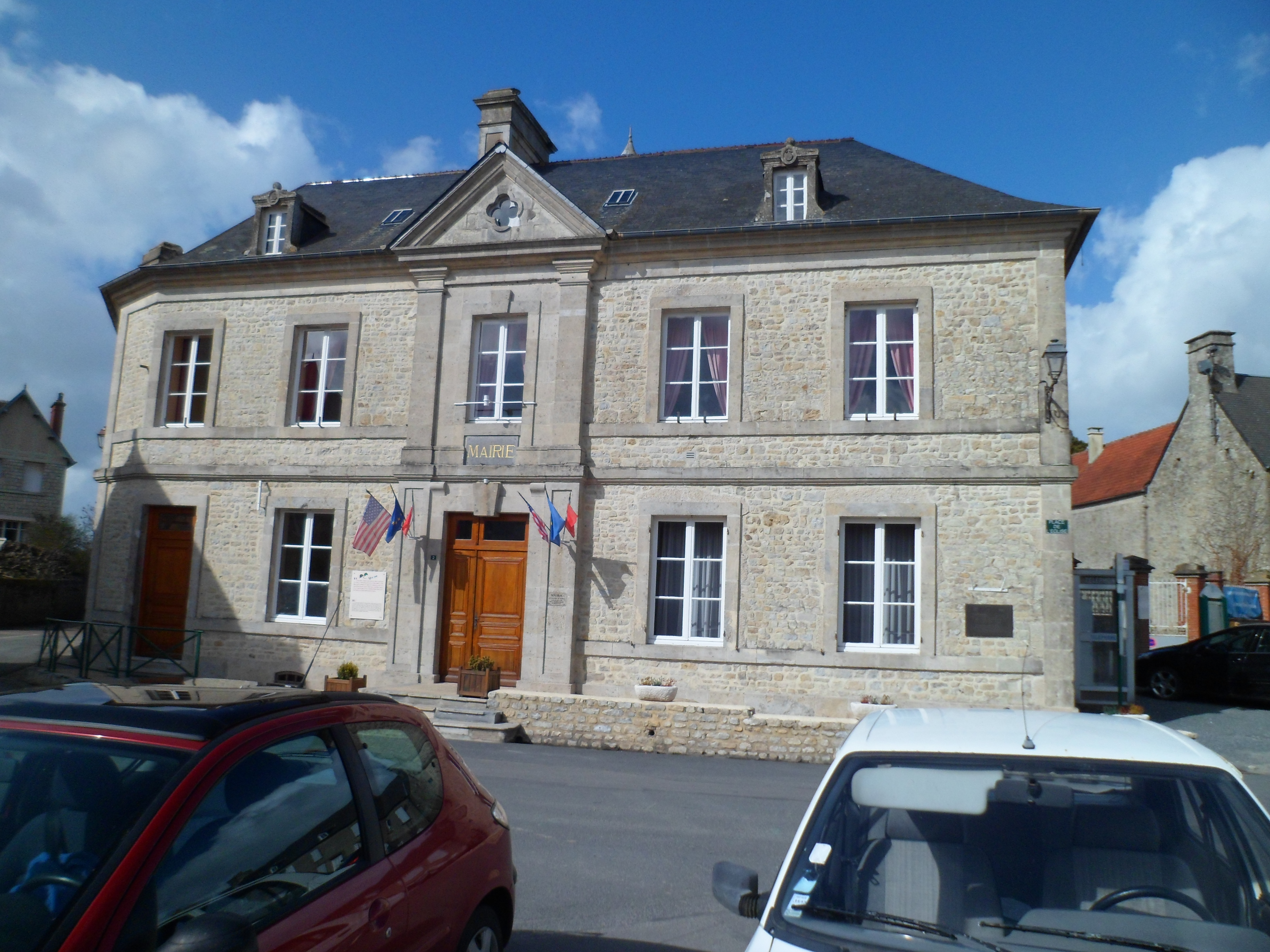
The town hall

List of mayors of Sainte-Marie-du-Mont
Start	End	Name	Party	Other details
1813	1829	Vincent Larsonneur de Gouvets		
...				
1949	1991	Michel de Vallavieille	Independent	
...				
1998	In progress	Henri Milet	Independent	Farmer

== Demographics ==
A plaque paying tribute to the soldiers of the 101st Airborne Division

Historical population

Year	Pop.	±% p.a.
1793	1,322	—
1800	1,358	+0.38%
1806	1,309	−0.61%
1821	1,356	+0.24%
1831	1,398	+0.31%
1836	1,472	+1.04%
1841	1,419	−0.73%
1846	1,422	+0.04%
1851	1,398	−0.34%
1856	1,352	−0.67%
1861	1,357	+0.07%
1866	1,413	+0.81%
1872	1,314	−1.20%

Year	Pop.	±% p.a.
1876	1,352	+0.72%
1881	1,332	−0.30%
1886	1,322	−0.15%
1891	1,298	−0.37%
1896	1,341	+0.65%
1901	1,234	−1.65%
1906	1,219	−0.24%
1911	1,148	−1.19%
1921	999	−1.38%
1926	1,008	+0.18%
1931	921	−1.79%
1936	948	+0.58%
1946	971	+0.24%

Year	Pop.	±% p.a.
1954	954	−0.22%
1962	981	+0.35%
1968	896	−1.50%
1975	804	−1.54%
1982	765	−0.71%
1990	779	+0.23%
1999	804	+0.35%
2007	774	−0.47%
2012	740	−0.89%
2017	720	−0.55%
2023	685	−0.83%

From 1962 to 1999: Population without double counting; for the years following: municipal population.
Source: Ldh/EHESS/Cassini until 1999 then INSEE

== Economy and tourism ==
Since February 2010, Sainte-Marie-du-Mont, Sainte-Mère-Église and Ravenoville have formed a grouping of "communes touristiques".

== Places and monuments ==
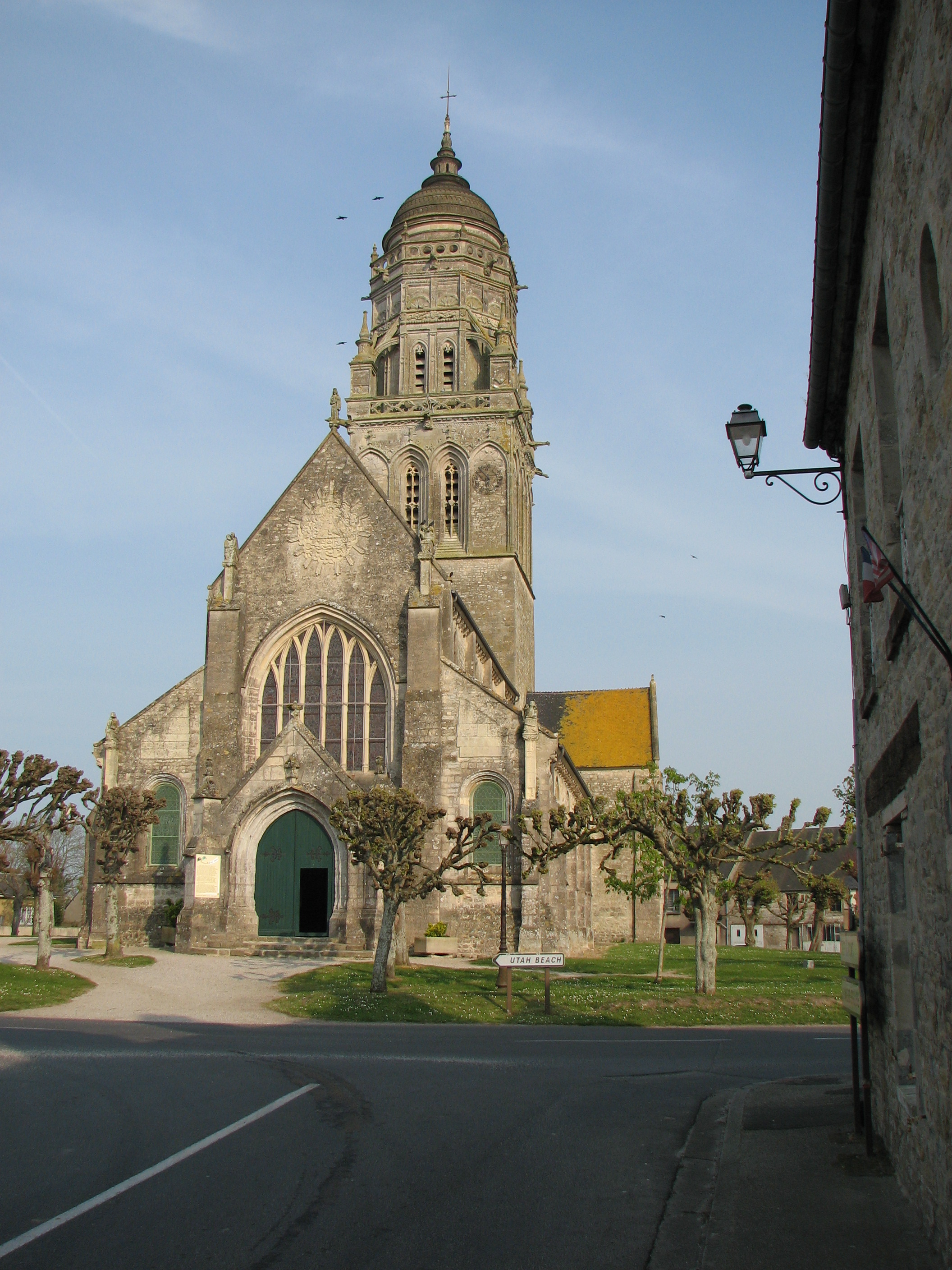
The church of Notre-Dame de l'Assomption

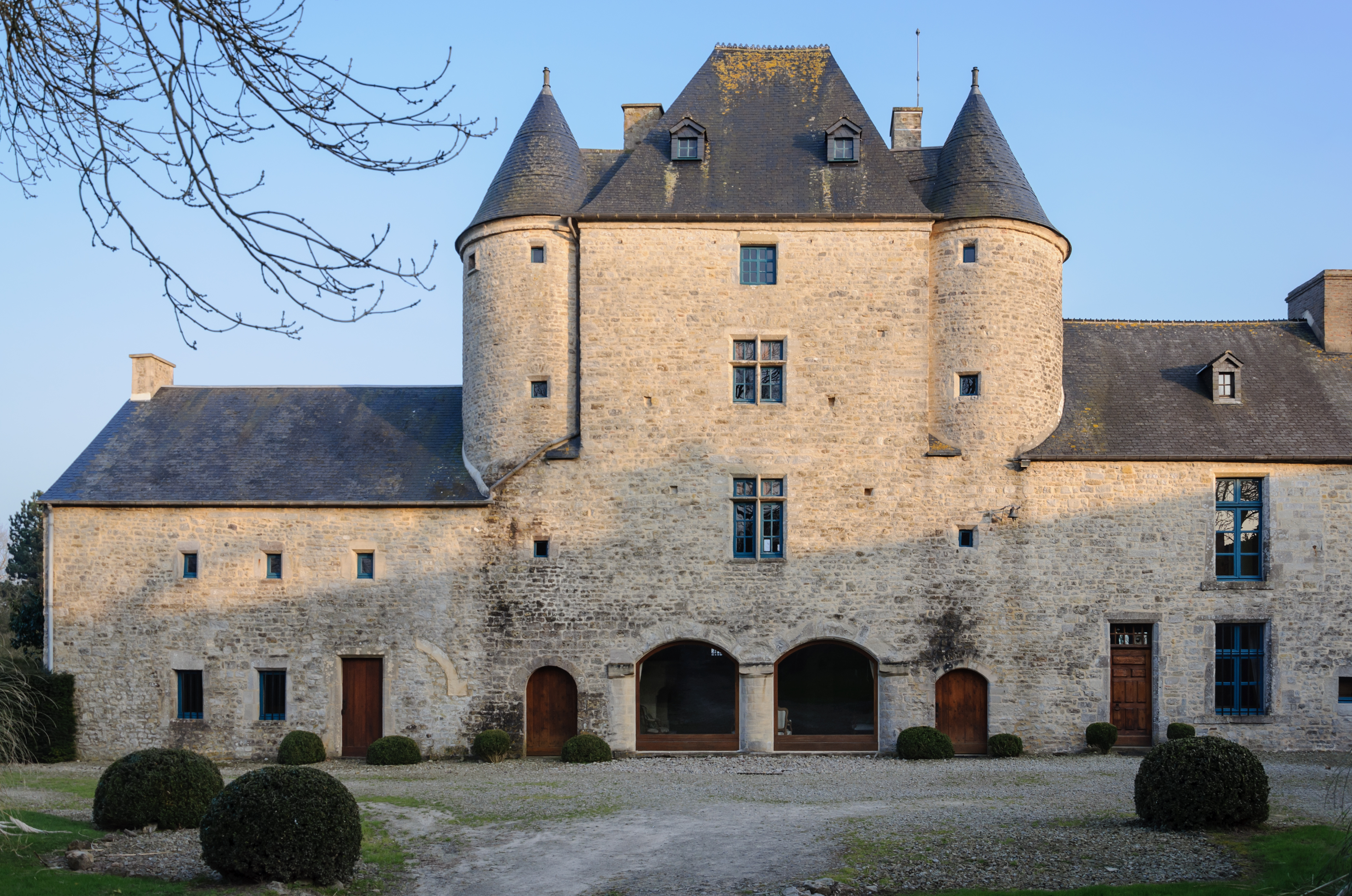
The castle of Sainte-Marie-du-Mont, registered as an historic building

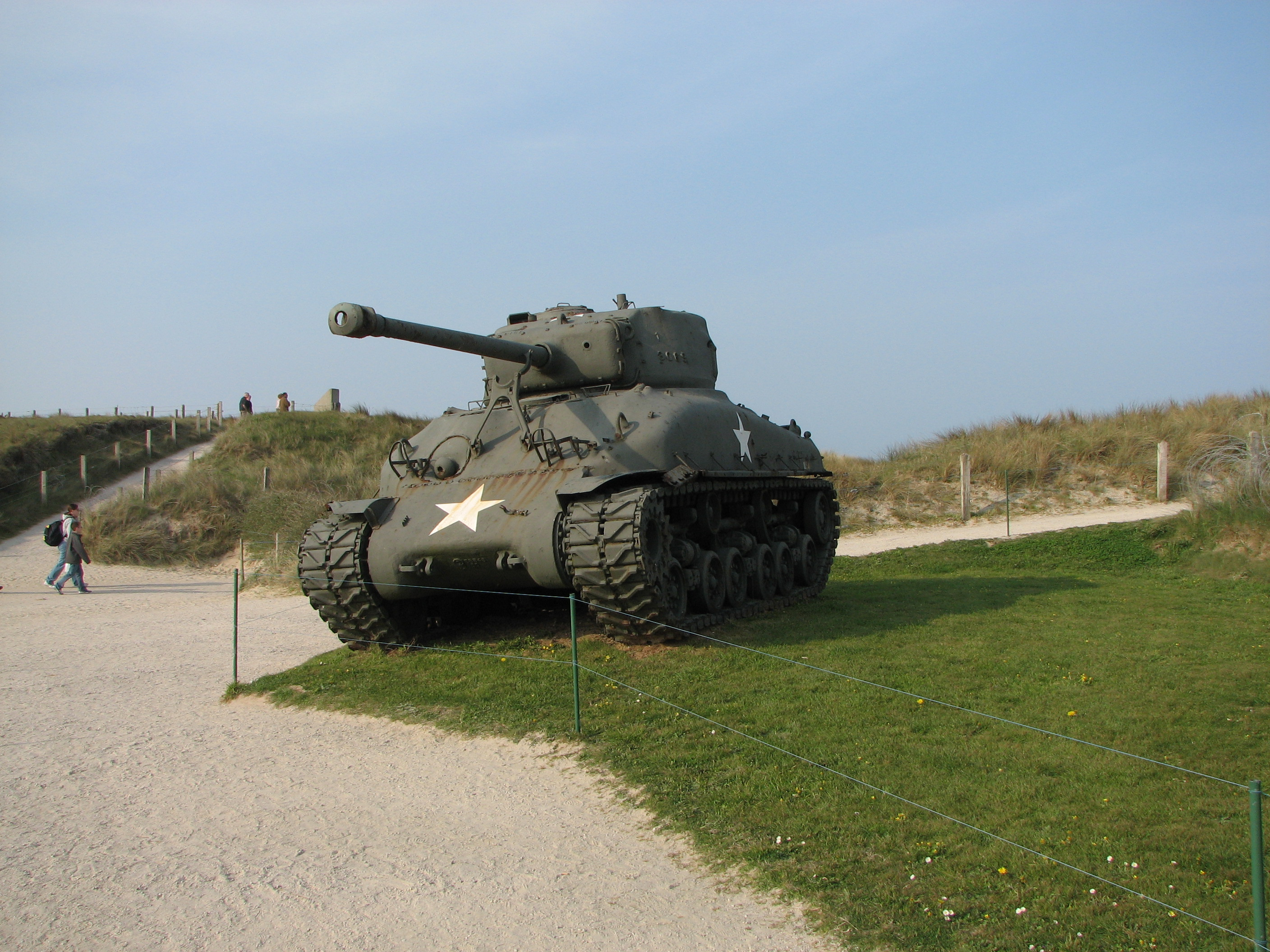
A Sherman tank facing Utah Beach

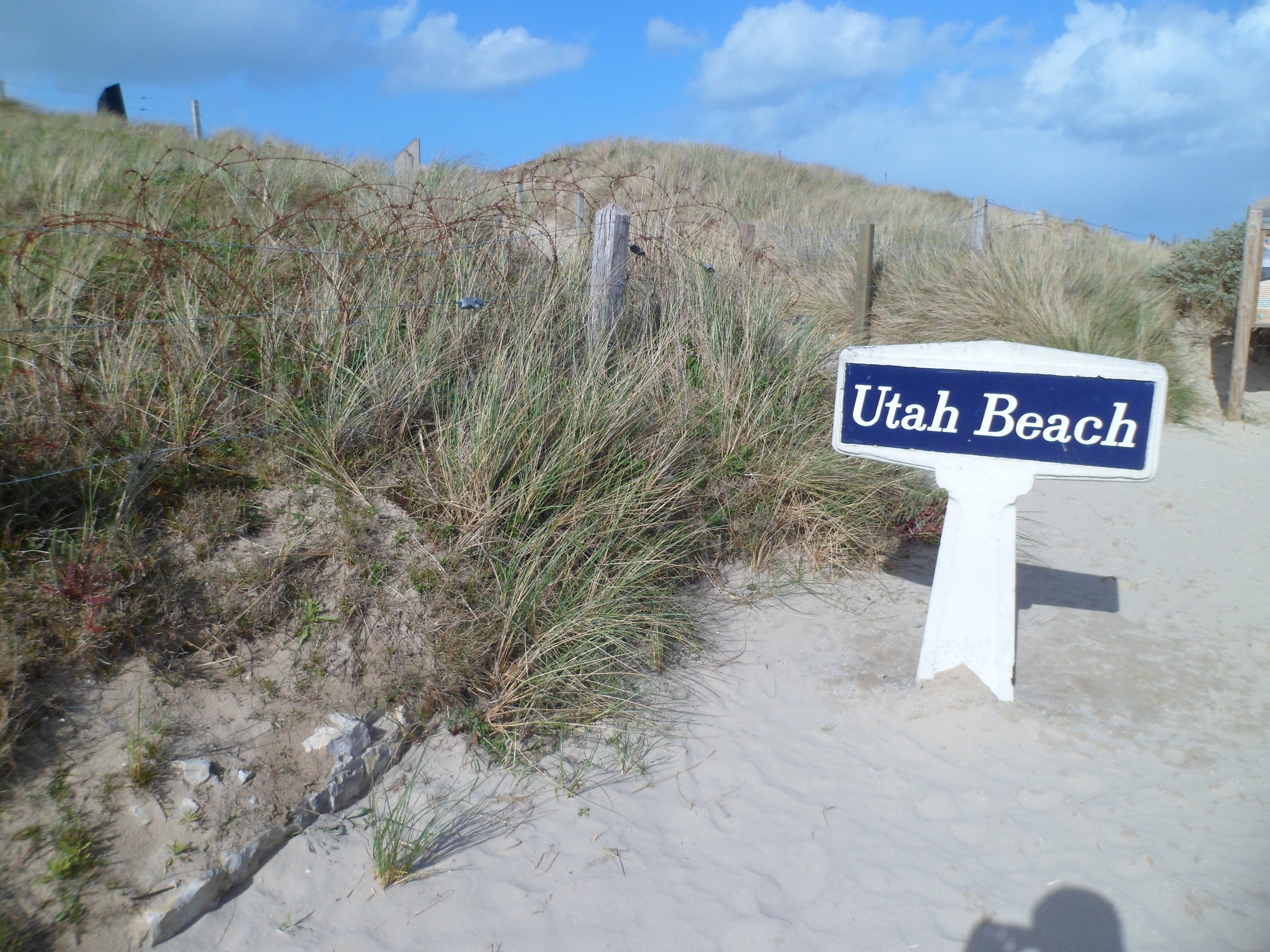
Utah Beach

- Utah Beach Landing Museum: A museum which traces the military exploit of the Normandy landings and more specifically that of Utah Beach. Created in 1962, it is located adjacent to the beach, even where American troops landed on the morning of June 6. The museum presents a substantial collection of archival photographs, models, maps (cartes d'État Major), and particular articles of veterans and distributes an archive film in three languages.
- Former Museum of the Occupation (Now Permanently Closed): located in the former German military headquarters for the Utah Beach sector, it housed the German Kommandantur before becoming the command post of American 101st Airborne, before relocating to Hiesville under General Taylor. The building then became the headquarters of United States 4th Infantry Division (United States) and various other units for the Utah Beach area on the morning of 6 June 1944 and until 1 November. This historic building stands out for its renowned German murals. The property, now designated as a Monument Historique by the French government, is privately owned.
- Liberation Museum: Located opposite the church, this museum houses a collection of uniforms, weapons, equipment and American and German vehicles. Captured trophies and objects from excavations of the battlefield where the paratroopers of the 101st Airborne Division and the American beach landing units faced the German troops.
- Church of Our Lady of the Assumption, built in the 11th century and revised in the 12th to 13th centuries, is a listed monument since 1840. Before the Revolution, one could see the white marble tomb of Henri-Robert-aux-Épaules above which stood a group representing the captain kneeling in full armor and accompanied by two Swiss.
- Utah Beach
- Borne No. 0 0 of the "Liberty Road" at Utah Beach.
- Stele in tribute to the sailors of the US Navy.
- Redoute d'Audouville (17th century)
- Château de l'Islet, one of the oldest of the Cotentin. The first building, probably a simple wooden fort was replaced by a castle, which included moats, dungeons, and drawbridges. It was demolished by Robert-aux-Épaules in the early seventeenth century and replaced by a castle with two identical dwellings bordering the two opposite sides of a courtyard surrounded by moats. The latter was abandoned in the eighteenth century and was later partially destroyed, especially during the Revolution. Few vestiges remain.
- Grandies Farm, seemed to belong to the 17th century Brohier, lord of the Grandis. The home is an elongated rectangular building, built in limestone rubble and covered by a hipped slate roof.
- Maillardière Manor Farm (17th century)
- Lavalle Nanor Farm
- The manor in Sainte-Marie-du-Mont: The land was part of the manor of Charles, Prince of Soubise, sold in 1821. In the late 19th century, the Gosselin family simultaneously owned the manor, the river and Brucheville Manor.
- Haudienville Manor (16th century), now separated by a boundary wall which divides the house into two properties. This remarkable mansion had a chapel founded in 1660. Its home is a vast construct comprising a rectangular building flanked by a pavilion.
- Blainville Manor
- Brécourt Manor (12th and 18th centuries), its name has evolved from Brucourt en Brécourt. The overall construction is rubble limestone. The roofs are slate, the house is on two levels lit by windows divided into bays. It was the scene of one of the most significant feats of the Battle of Normandy, the Brécourt Manor Assault, led by paratroopers of the 506th Infantry Regiment led by Lt. Richard Winters of the 101st Airborne Division, on 6 June 1944.
- Franqueville Manor
- La Rivière Manor (16th century), the house is built of rubble limestone and discovered covered by a gabled slate roof. It is a long building with a tower of polygonal staircase off-work. Its agricultural buildings are dated from 1793.
- Vienville Manor, its name has evolved from Viéville (after 1656), then Vieuville. Between 1656 and 1699, Jean Mouton, husband of Miss Françoise Hauchemail, heir of the manor, undertook major renovations. From the old mansion some remains of the 17th century still hold attention, including a long farm building housing a remarkable carriage house and stable.
- Mardelle Manor

== Notable people ==
- Paul-Jacques Bonzon, born in Sainte-Marie-du-Mont in 1908, a teacher trained at the école normale in Saint-Lô, worked most of his career in the department of Drôme. He was among the most representative youth novelist of the 1960s to the 1980s. Author of more than a hundred novels, he is best known for the hit series Les Six Compagnons [The Six Companions], La Famille HLM [The HLM Family] and Diabolo le petit chat [Diablo the Little Cat]. He did not forget his hometown. The action of some of his novels is situated in the area: The dunes of Sainte-Marie-du-Mont, the beaches of Ravenoville, the Îles Saint-Marcouf, etc. He died in Valence in 1978.
- Gilles Perrault has lived in Sainte-Marie-du-Mont for more than thirty years. He wrote Les Gens d'ici [The People Here], a book that describes the life of the local residents.

== International relations ==
Sainte-Marie-du-Mont is twinned with Edelfingen, Bad Mergentheim.

== See also ==
- Communes of the Manche department
