= Hiesville =

- Commune
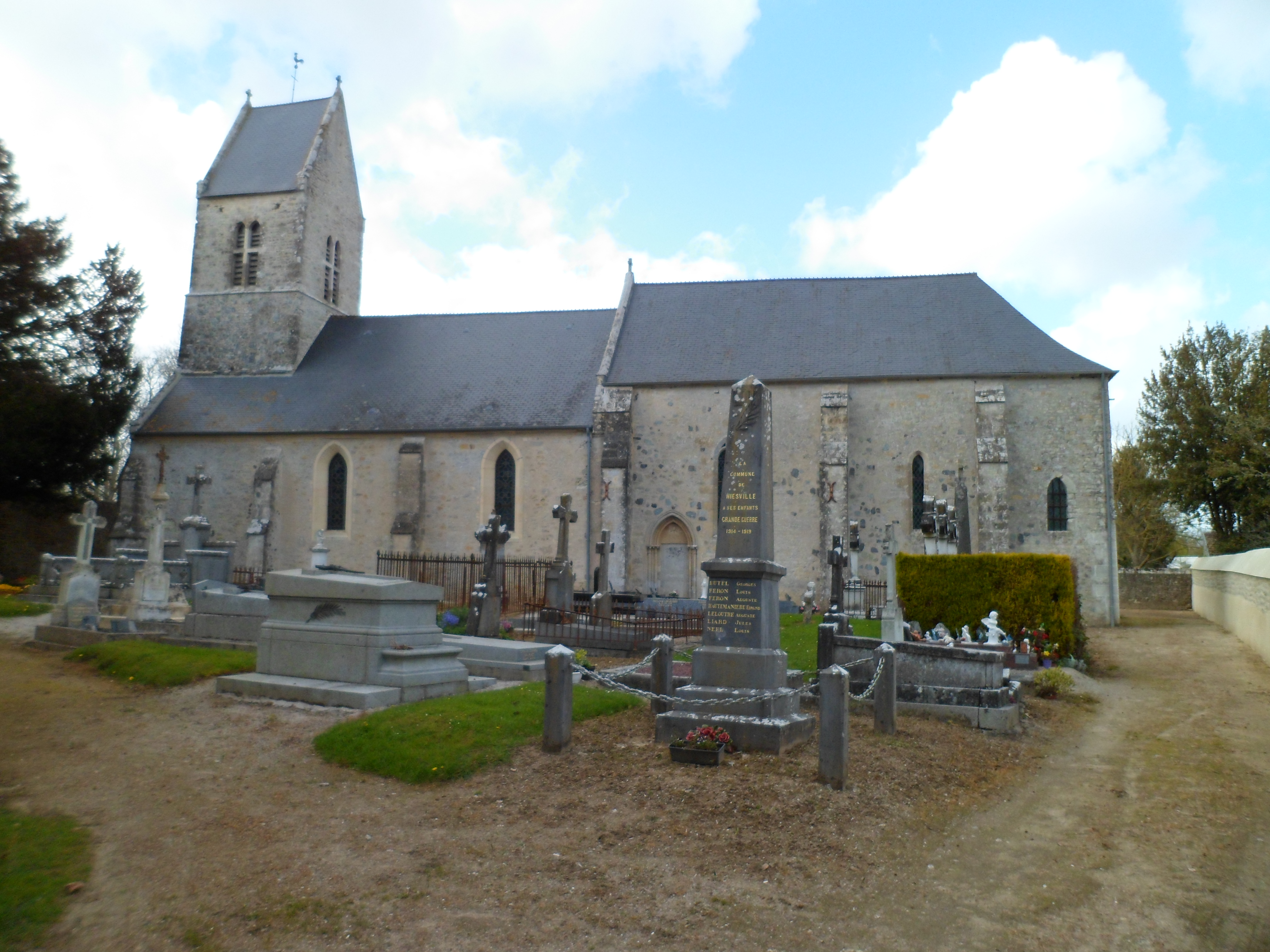
- The church in Hiesville
- Location of Hiesville
- Location within France Location within Normandy
- Coordinates: 49°22′21″N 1°15′44″W
- Country: France
- Region: Normandy
- Department: Manche
- Arrondissement: Cherbourg
- Canton: Carentan-les-Marais
- Intercommunality: La Baie du Cotentin

Government
  - Mayor (2020–2026): Agnès Bouffard
- Area^{1}: 4.03 km^{2} (1.56 sq mi)
- Highest elevation: 38 m (125 ft)
- Lowest elevation: 2 m (6.6 ft)
- Population (2023): 72
  - Density: 18/km^{2} (46/sq mi)
- Demonym: Hiesvillais
- Time zone: UTC+01:00 (CET)
  - Summer (DST): UTC+02:00 (CEST)
- INSEE/Postal code: 50246 /50480
- ^{1} French Land Register data, which excludes lakes, ponds, glaciers > 1 km^{2} (0.386 sq mi or 247 acres) and river estuaries.

Hiesville (French pronunciation: [jɛvil]) is a commune in the Manche department in Normandy, north-western France. A small commune, Hiesville covers an area of just 4.03 km^{2} (1.56 sq mi). It is bounded by Boutteville to the north, Blosville to the west, Sainte-Marie-du-Mont to the east, and Vierville to the south, and lies several kilometres from the Normandy coast.

The population was 70 as of 2019. It was 148 in 1866.

== Etymology ==
It was known as Hevilla in 1164, de Heevilla in 1180, and Hievilla in 1327. It derives from the Germanic personal name Hedo, and villa (translation: "village").

== History ==
Early residents

Michel le Loup, of Yeville (Hiesville), was knighted in the year 1543. The nobleman and squire, Guillaume Bellot of Hiesville was knighted in 1594. In 1598, Maurice du Praël owned the fiefdom and was the Lord of Hiesville. Eight years later, in 1606, the noblemen of Hiesville included Jacques Richier, Sieur de Colombières, a Calvinist; Jacques Bellot, Sieur de Callouville; and Pierre Lelong, Sieur de Limarcst, also a Calvinist. By 1789, Lord of Hiesville was Joseph-Bon-Pierre Le Vavasseur.

World War II

There are three memorials related to the invasion of Normandy during World War II in the area as it was where the gliders of the 101st Airborne Division landed. Officers of the 101st Airborne Division set a hospital up at the Chateau de Colombières which was at the north end of Hiesville, near Utah Beach.

== Landmarks ==
Notable buildings include the Église Saint-Côme Saint-Damien and the 17th century Château de Hiesville which was also renovated in the 19th century.

Église Saint-Côme Saint-Damien, the parish church, is an oblong square, and consists of a chancel and a nave. Built in the 13th century and renovated in the 19th century, it is dedicated to the patron saints of Saints Cosmas and Damian. Since 1803, it was an annex of Blosville, but this relationship ended in 1856.

== Notable people ==
- Jean-Baptiste Le Carpentier (born Hiesville, 1759), Deputy to the French National Convention

== See also ==
- Communes of the Manche department
