= Boutteville (disambiguation) =

Boutteville may refer to:

- Boutteville, a commune in the Manche department in Normandy in northwestern France
- Bouteville, a commune in the Charente department in southwestern France
- César Boutteville (1917–2015), French–Vietnamese chess master

== See also ==
- Le Barc de Boutteville, an art gallery in Paris
- Bouteville (disambiguation)
