= Stéphen Chauvet =

French writer

- Born: 27 November 1885; Béthune
- Died: 2 April 1950 (aged 64); 7th arrondissement of Paris

Stéphen-Charles Chauvet (1885–1950), commonly known as Dr Stéphen Chauvet, was a French physician, specialist, and collector of traditional arts from Africa and Oceania, contributing significantly to their recognition in France. He was a Commander of the Legion of Honour.

Chauvet was the author of the first illustrated book about Easter Island, L'Île de Pâques et ses mystères, published in Paris in 1935. Chauvet never traveled to Easter Island; he derived much of his information from sources of mixed reliability. However, his book remains an important work, in particular, because of its many illustrations, some of which show objects that no longer exist.

The French version of the book has never been republished. A Spanish translation, La isla de Pascua y sus misterios, was published in Santiago, Chile, in 1946 and reprinted in 1970. An English translation has also been published.

== Biography ==
=== Family origins ===
Doctor Stéphen-Charles Chauvet was born on 27 November 1885, in Béthune (Pas-de-Calais), of Norman origin. His father was an inventor. (Note: He invented the arc lamp and the "Chauvet winch," which revolutionized mining conditions; he also built the first automobile carburetor.)

=== Medical studies ===
A laureate in the general competition, he obtained a bachelor's degree in philosophy at the age of 15. The naturalist Mangin, director of the Museum, recognized his observational skills and convinced him to abandon preparations for Polytechnique in favor of a career in medicine. He completed brilliant studies with an internship in Paris (1909–1914). He received numerous awards throughout his medical years, including the Faculty Laureate, the Academy of Medicine, thesis prizes, and Gold Medals from the Assistance publique. As a physician, his professional publications list included more than 300 titles, including articles, general reviews on various medical topics, books, and original works showcasing his medical discoveries.

=== World War I ===
Chauvet went to the front in August 1914 and commenced his participation in World War I. He was wounded on 4 September 1914, in Saint-Maurice, Vosges, where a shell fragment caused left hemiplegia resulting in chronic pain throughout his life.

=== Collector and specialist in African and Oceanic arts ===
Stéphen Chauvet is known for his passion for traditional African and Oceanic arts. After World War I, he obtained a small female statuette from Sudan and a double mask from the widow of Commander Bertrand, who had returned from Zinder. As a curious, unconventional, and innovative physician, Chauvet was drawn to traditional African art. He wrote about African art, African music, the medicine of indigenous peoples, and the arts of New Guinea. Viewing objects as an essential pathway to understanding cultures, he criticized cerebral anthropology that overlooked the examination of material products of civilizations. His intellectual passion logically combined with a material passion, and he became a collector of traditional African art.

Chauvet, who had a residence in La Gaude, learned about the sale of the possessions of Count Rodolphe Festetics de Tolna. Stéphen Chauvet owned a copy of Festetics' book and knew the riches of his collection. This wealthy Hungarian noble had traveled in the Pacific on a personal yacht at the end of the 19th century and brought back many souvenirs. After the war, these souvenirs were seized—since he was an Austrian subject—in his property, Les Eucalyptus, on the French Riviera. (Note: Festetics de Tolna resided in Antibes at the outbreak of the Great War. Considered an Austro-Hungarian citizen, his assets were confiscated, and the part of the collection that had not been given to the Néprajzi Múzeum (Museum of Ethnology) in Budapest was consigned for years to the customs premises in Nice. The entire collection was put up for sale.) Following a series of efforts, Chauvet regained possession of this collection. It was so extensive that he had to rent storage on Boulevard de Grenelle to keep it until he could find a place for it in a floor of his home on Rue de Grenelle, in an old house that he had turned into a museum.

Dr. Stéphen Chauvet found his most valuable pieces in the collections of missionaries and dealers in Antwerp, Brussels, and Hamburg. Chauvet was also a major collector of Norman ceramics and wrote a book on ancestral Normandy. (Note: In 1969, Madame Jacqueline-Louis Gallouin-Chauvet, his daughter, donated most of this collection to the Coutances Museum. This donation was supplemented by a bequest in 1984. The collection, primarily devoted to the three major pottery centers of the Cotentin Peninsula (Néhou, Sauxemesnil, and Vindefontaine), also includes pieces from Ger, Noron, and Le Pré d'Auge. The collection of Norman ceramics by Dr. Stéphen Chauvet is one of the major points of interest at the Coutances Museum.)

Chauvet's interest in indigenous art manifested itself through advocacy. In the early winter of 1923–1924, he conceived, wrote, and edited the guide for the exhibition on indigenous arts of French colonies at the Pavillon de Marsan. He advocated for the creation of a "colonial museum," a French Royal Museum for Central Africa to "educate our compatriots."

In 1929, he acquired a collection of objects brought from Easter Island by the writer Pierre Loti.

In February 1930, he participated in the Negro Art Exhibition, presenting nearly 400 pieces of "very good quality" at the Théâtre Pigalle Gallery. His ambition was to "make Paris the center of the movement in favor of indigenous arts." Three months later, after several weeks of preparation, he launched the Oceanic Art Exhibition of French colonies at the Galerie de la Renaissance. Also in 1930, his friendship with Marshal Lyautey and Governor-General Antonetti allowed him to create, as part of the Colonial Exhibition, the Synthesis Palace's Indigenous Arts Exhibition from all French colonies. Preparing these rooms took him nine months of work. At the end of 1930, he participated in the Negro Art Exhibition at the Palais des Beaux-Arts in Brussels to promote the art of French colonies.

On 17 October 1931, as passionate about music as he was about the visual arts, he organized a gala evening given by the International Institute for the Study of African Languages and Civilizations, during which he played traditional African music and songs.

Chauvet was generous to French museums. In February 1929, he donated a large collection of African and Oceanic art objects and weapons (over 800 pieces) to the Trocadéro Museum, which engraved his name in the entrance hall. These pieces are now at the Quai Branly Museum. The Ethnographic Museums of Lyon (1930), Rouen (1931), the Navy Museum in Brest (1931–1932), and the Ethnographic Museum in Cherbourg (1933) also benefited from his generosity. Some pieces from his collection are now in private hands, like those held by the Barbier-Mueller Museum in Geneva.

Dr. Chauvet authored numerous publications: volumes on New Guinea art and Easter Island. However, the war and his poor health practically interrupted his work.

=== Later life ===
Having spent part of World War II in Monpazier, Dordogne, where he had acquired a house, he died in Paris on 2 April 1950. He was buried in Nicorps, Manche.

== Bibliography ==
- Stéphen Chauvet, L'Infantilisme hypophysaire: précédé d'une introduction à l'étude des infantilismes et d'une classification des syndromes hypophysaires, Paris, 1914.
- Stéphen Chauvet, Initiation à l'art d'être maman, Paris, Maloine, 1924.
- Stéphen Chauvet, La Normandie ancestrale. Ethnologie, vie, coutumes, meubles, ustensiles, costumes, patois, Boivin, Paris.
- Stéphen Chauvet, La Céramique bas-normande ancienne. I/ Texte II/ Iconographie, éd. du Mortainais, Mortain.
- Stéphen Chauvet, Les Empoisonnements par les Champignons, Paris, Librairie Le François, 1916.
- Stéphen Chauvet, Coutances et ses environs: guide historique, descriptif et illustré de la ville, de la cathédrale, des vieilles églises et des monuments historiques, Paris, éd. Honoré Champion, 1921.
- Stéphen Chauvet, Musique Nègre. Considérations Techniques, Instruments de Musique (92 figures), Recueil de 118 airs notés, Paris, Société d’Éditions Géographiques, Maritimes et Coloniales, 1929.
- Stéphen Chauvet, Les arts indigènes de la Nouvelle Guinée, Paris, Société d’Éditions Géographiques, Maritimes et Coloniales, 1930, 350 pages, 486 figures in 114 plates.
- Stéphen Chauvet, L'Île de Pâques et ses mystères, Paris, 1935, 86 pp. of text. Illustrated with 68 plates featuring 186 figures.
- Stéphen Chauvet, La médecine chez les peuples primitifs (préhistoriques et contemporains), Paris, Maloine, 1936, 144 pages.
