= Amfreville, Manche =

Amfreville
- Part of Picauville
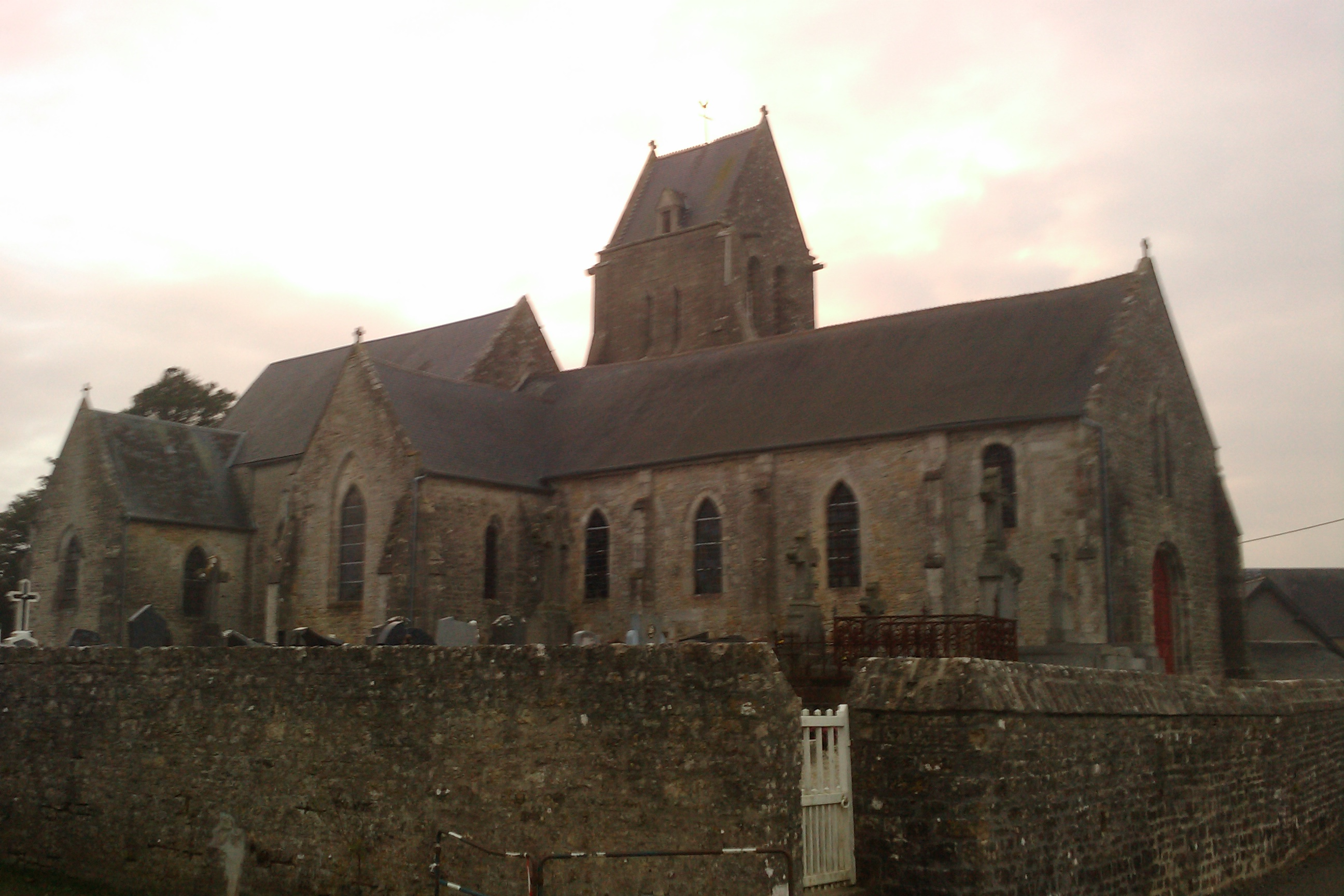
- Church of Saint-Martin
- Location of Amfreville
- Location within France Location within Normandy
- Coordinates: 49°24′38″N 1°23′29″W
- Country: France
- Region: Normandy
- Department: Manche
- Arrondissement: Cherbourg
- Canton: Carentan
- Commune: Picauville
- Area^{1}: 10.10 km^{2} (3.90 sq mi)
- Elevation: 14 m (46 ft)
- Highest elevation: 31 m (102 ft)
- Lowest elevation: 1 m (3.3 ft)
- Population (2019): 287
  - Density: 28.4/km^{2} (73.6/sq mi)
- Time zone: UTC+01:00 (CET)
  - Summer (DST): UTC+02:00 (CEST)
- Postal code: 50480
- ^{1} French Land Register data, which excludes lakes, ponds, glaciers > 1 km^{2} (0.386 sq mi or 247 acres) and river estuaries.

Amfreville (French pronunciation: [ɑ̃fʁəvil]) is a former commune in the Manche department in the Normandy region in northwestern France. On 1 January 2016, it was merged into the commune of Picauville.

== Population ==
Historical population

Year	Pop.	±% p.a.
1821	938	—
1846	830	−0.49%
1872	726	−0.51%
1901	614	−0.58%
1926	540	−0.51%
1946	459	−0.81%
1962	414	−0.64%

Year	Pop.	±% p.a.
1968	369	−1.90%
1975	333	−1.46%
1982	312	−0.93%
1990	295	−0.70%
1999	290	−0.19%
2019	287	−0.05%

Source: EHESS and INSEE

== See also ==
- Communes of the Manche department
