= Bouteville (disambiguation) =

Bouteville may refer to:

- Bouteville, a commune in the Charente department in southwestern France
- Boutteville, a commune in the Manche department in Normandy in northwestern France
- François de Montmorency-Bouteville (1600–1627), second son of Louis de Montmorency, Comte de Bouteville

== See also ==
- Boutteville (disambiguation)
