= Houtteville =

- Part of Picauville
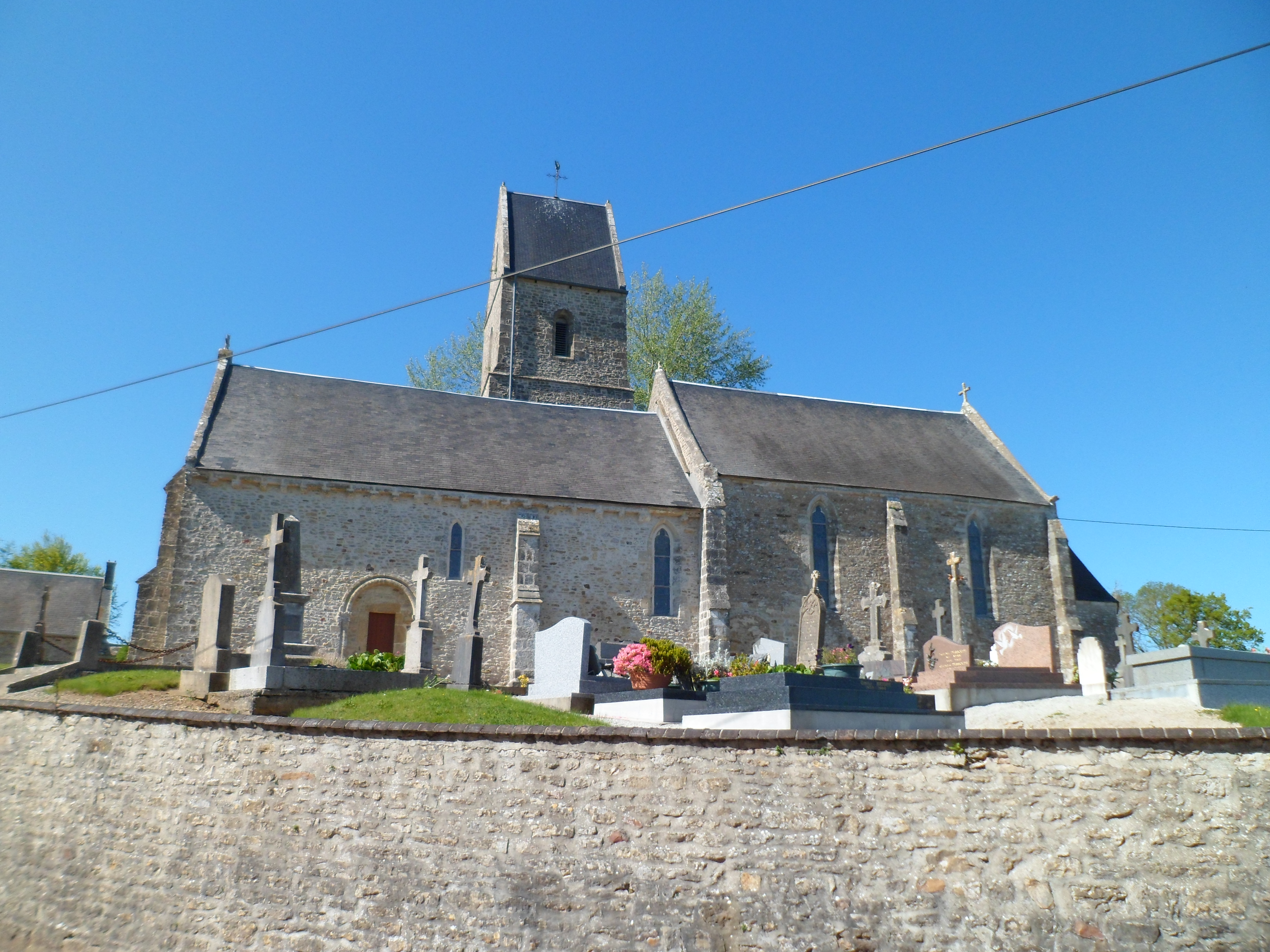
- The church of Saint-Jean-Baptiste
- Location of Houtteville
- Location within France Location within Normandy
- Coordinates: 49°20′21″N 1°21′39″W
- Country: France
- Region: Normandy
- Department: Manche
- Arrondissement: Cherbourg
- Canton: Carentan
- Commune: Picauville
- Area^{1}: 4.51 km^{2} (1.74 sq mi)
- Elevation: 120 m (390 ft)
- Highest elevation: 37 m (121 ft)
- Lowest elevation: 1 m (3.3 ft)
- Population (2019): 70
  - Density: 16/km^{2} (40/sq mi)
- Demonym: Houttevillais
- Time zone: UTC+01:00 (CET)
  - Summer (DST): UTC+02:00 (CEST)
- Postal code: 50250
- ^{1} French Land Register data, which excludes lakes, ponds, glaciers > 1 km^{2} (0.386 sq mi or 247 acres) and river estuaries.

Houtteville (French pronunciation: [utvil]) is a former commune in the Manche department in north-western France. On 1 January 2016, it was merged into the commune of Picauville.

== Heraldry ==
Arms of Houtteville	The arms of Houtteville are blazoned : Per fess, sable and Or.

== See also ==
- Communes of the Manche department
