= Vindefontaine =

- Part of Picauville
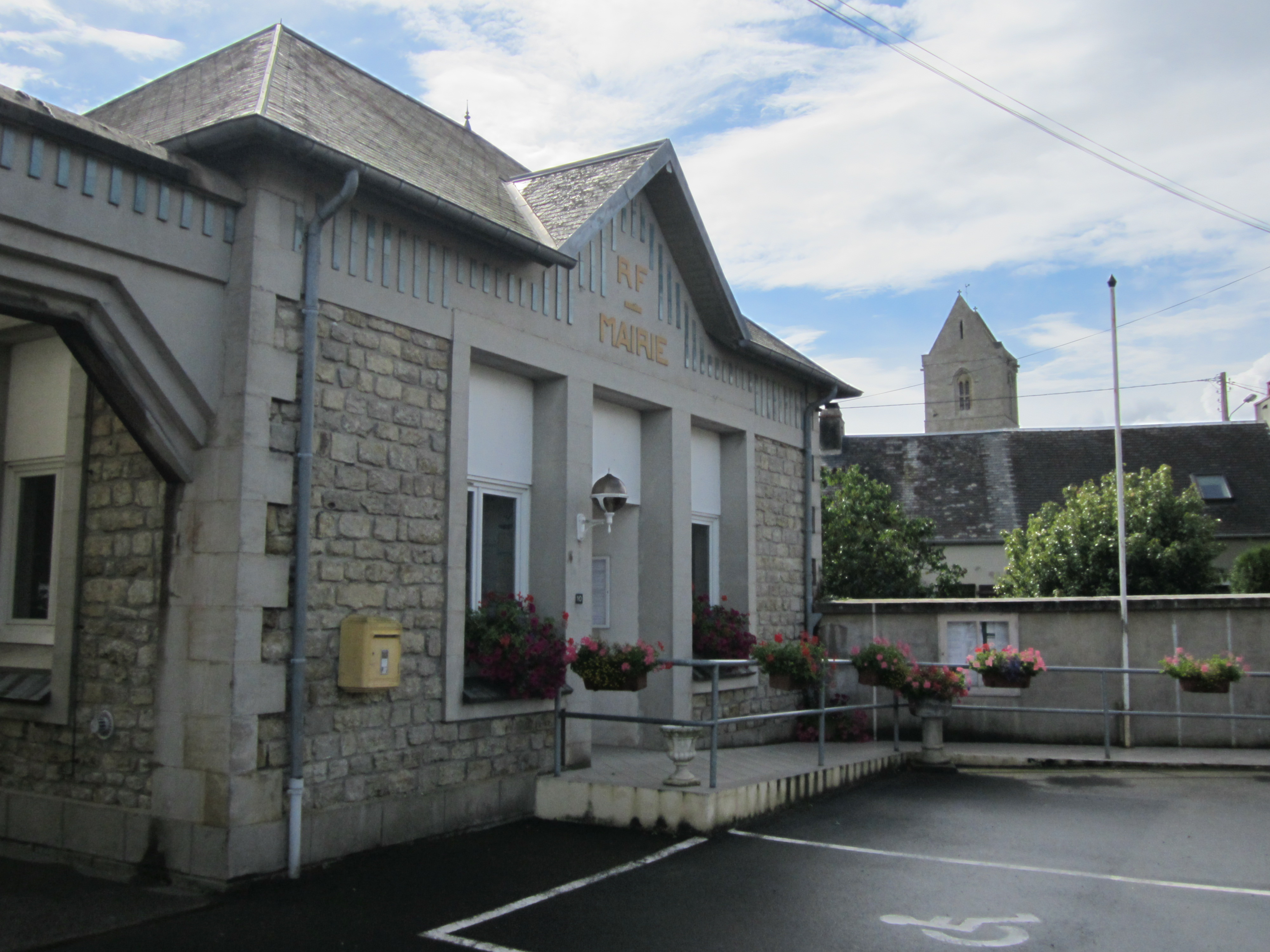
- Town hall and Saint-Martin church
- Location of Vindefontaine
- Location within France Location within Normandy
- Coordinates: 49°20′20″N 1°25′02″W
- Country: France
- Region: Normandy
- Department: Manche
- Arrondissement: Cherbourg
- Canton: Carentan
- Commune: Picauville
- Area^{1}: 8.13 km^{2} (3.14 sq mi)
- Elevation: 7 m (23 ft)
- Highest elevation: 41 m (135 ft)
- Lowest elevation: 2 m (6.6 ft)
- Population (2019): 311
  - Density: 38.3/km^{2} (99.1/sq mi)
- Time zone: UTC+01:00 (CET)
  - Summer (DST): UTC+02:00 (CEST)
- Postal code: 50250
- ^{1} French Land Register data, which excludes lakes, ponds, glaciers > 1 km^{2} (0.386 sq mi or 247 acres) and river estuaries.

Vindefontaine (French pronunciation: [vɛ̃dfɔ̃tɛn]) is a former commune in the Manche department in Normandy in north-western France. On 1 January 2016, it was merged into the commune of Picauville.

== See also ==
- Communes of the Manche department
