= Les Moitiers-en-Bauptois =

- Part of Picauville
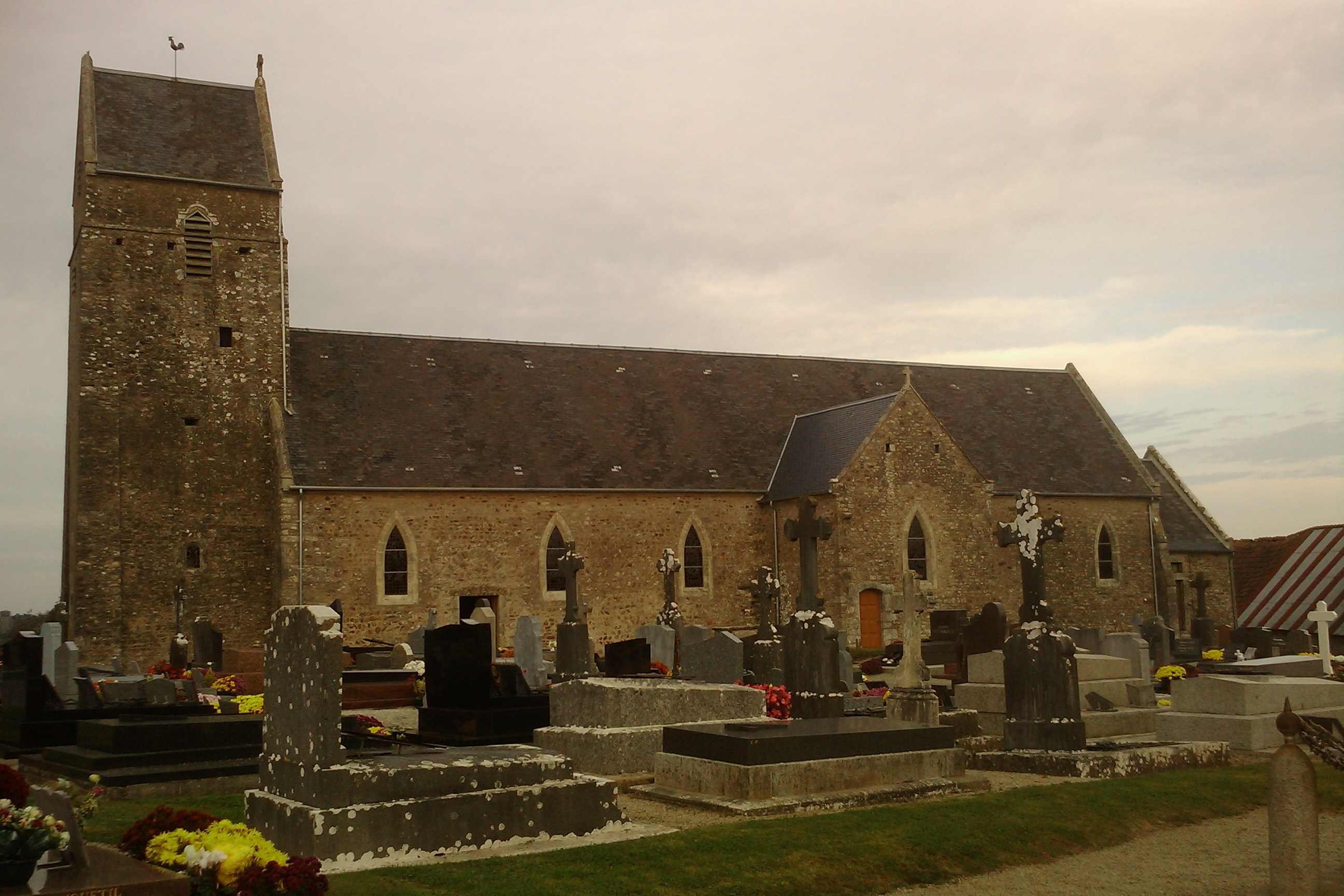
- The church
- Location of Les Moitiers-en-Bauptois
- Location within France Location within Normandy
- Coordinates: 49°21′59″N 1°26′07″W
- Country: France
- Region: Normandy
- Department: Manche
- Arrondissement: Cherbourg
- Canton: Bricquebec
- Commune: Picauville
- Area^{1}: 8.04 km^{2} (3.10 sq mi)
- Elevation: 22 m (72 ft)
- Highest elevation: 37 m (121 ft)
- Lowest elevation: 1 m (3.3 ft)
- Population (2019): 318
  - Density: 39.6/km^{2} (102/sq mi)
- Time zone: UTC+01:00 (CET)
  - Summer (DST): UTC+02:00 (CEST)
- Postal code: 50360
- ^{1} French Land Register data, which excludes lakes, ponds, glaciers > 1 km^{2} (0.386 sq mi or 247 acres) and river estuaries.

Les Moitiers-en-Bauptois (French pronunciation: [le mwatje ɑ̃ botwa]) is a former commune in the Manche department in Normandy in north-western France. On 1 January 2017, it was merged into the commune Picauville.

== See also ==
- Communes of the Manche department
