= Picauville =

- Commune
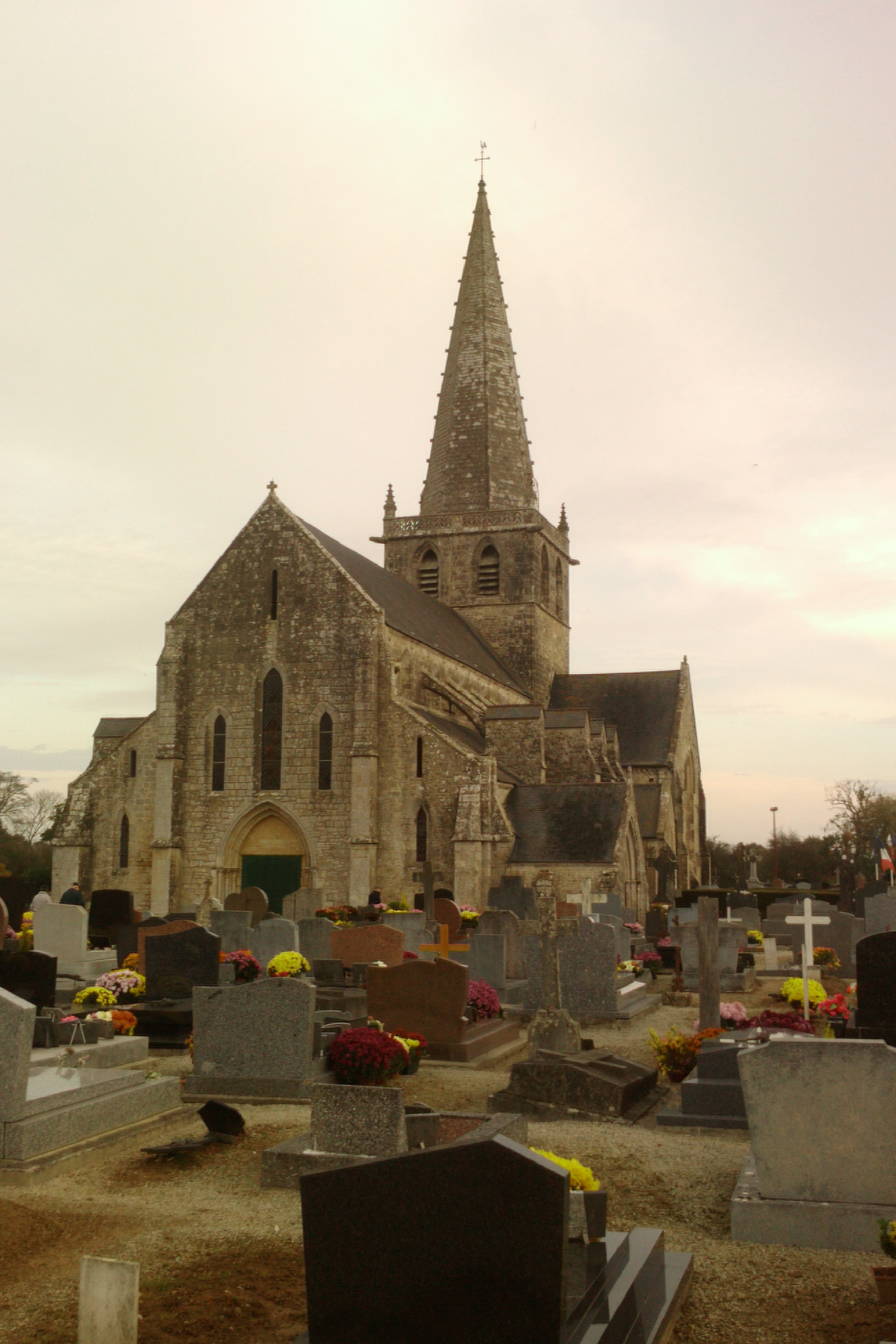
- The church of Saint-Candide

- Coat of arms
- Location of Picauville
- Location within France Location within Normandy
- Coordinates: 49°22′46″N 1°24′01″W
- Country: France
- Region: Normandy
- Department: Manche
- Arrondissement: Cherbourg
- Canton: Carentan-les-Marais
- Intercommunality: Baie du Cotentin

Government
  - Mayor (2020–2026): Marie-Hélène Perrotte
- Area^{1}: 64.89 km^{2} (25.05 sq mi)
- Elevation: 26 m (85 ft)
- Highest elevation: 30 m (98 ft)
- Lowest elevation: 2 m (6.6 ft)
- Population (2023): 3,228
  - Density: 49.75/km^{2} (128.8/sq mi)
- Time zone: UTC+01:00 (CET)
  - Summer (DST): UTC+02:00 (CEST)
- INSEE/Postal code: 50400 /50360
- ^{1} French Land Register data, which excludes lakes, ponds, glaciers > 1 km^{2} (0.386 sq mi or 247 acres) and river estuaries.

Picauville (French pronunciation: [pikovil]) is a commune in the Manche department in Normandy in north-western France. On 1 January 2016, the former communes of Amfreville, Cretteville, Gourbesville, Houtteville and Vindefontaine were merged into Picauville. On 1 January 2017, the former commune of Les Moitiers-en-Bauptois was merged into Picauville. The inhabitants are called Picauvillais. Picauville also has a 17th-century castle, classified as a historical landmark by the French government, called the Isle-Marie Castle. Parts of the structure date to the 11th century.

== Population ==
Population data refer to the area corresponding with the commune as of January 2025.

Historical population
Year	Pop.	±% p.a.
1968	4,250	—
1975	4,190	−0.20%
1982	3,949	−0.84%
1990	3,523	−1.42%
1999	3,294	−0.74%
2007	3,399	+0.39%
2012	3,412	+0.08%
2017	3,278	−0.80%
2023	3,228	−0.26%
Source: INSEE

== Heraldry ==
Arms of Picauville	The arms of Picauville are blazoned : Or, a crown of thorns sable between 3 mallets vert, and on a chief gules a leopard Or.

== World War II ==
Picauville was one of the first towns liberated by Allied forces following the Normandy landings in early June 1944; German General Wilhelm Falley was killed there by an American paratrooper shortly after the invasion began. Engineers of the Ninth Air Force IX Engineering Command began construction of a combat Advanced Landing Ground to the northwest of the town. Declared operational on 26 June, the airfield was designated as "A-8", it was used by the 405th Fighter Group which flew P-47 Thunderbolts until mid-September when the unit moved to St. Dizier, near Nancy. Afterward, the airfield was closed. A cairn marking the location of the airfield is on the east side of the D69, 2.3 km outside of Picauville on the way to Gourbesville (49°23'34.19"N, 1°25'07.69"E).

== See also ==
- Communes of the Manche department
