= Liesville-sur-Douve =

- Commune
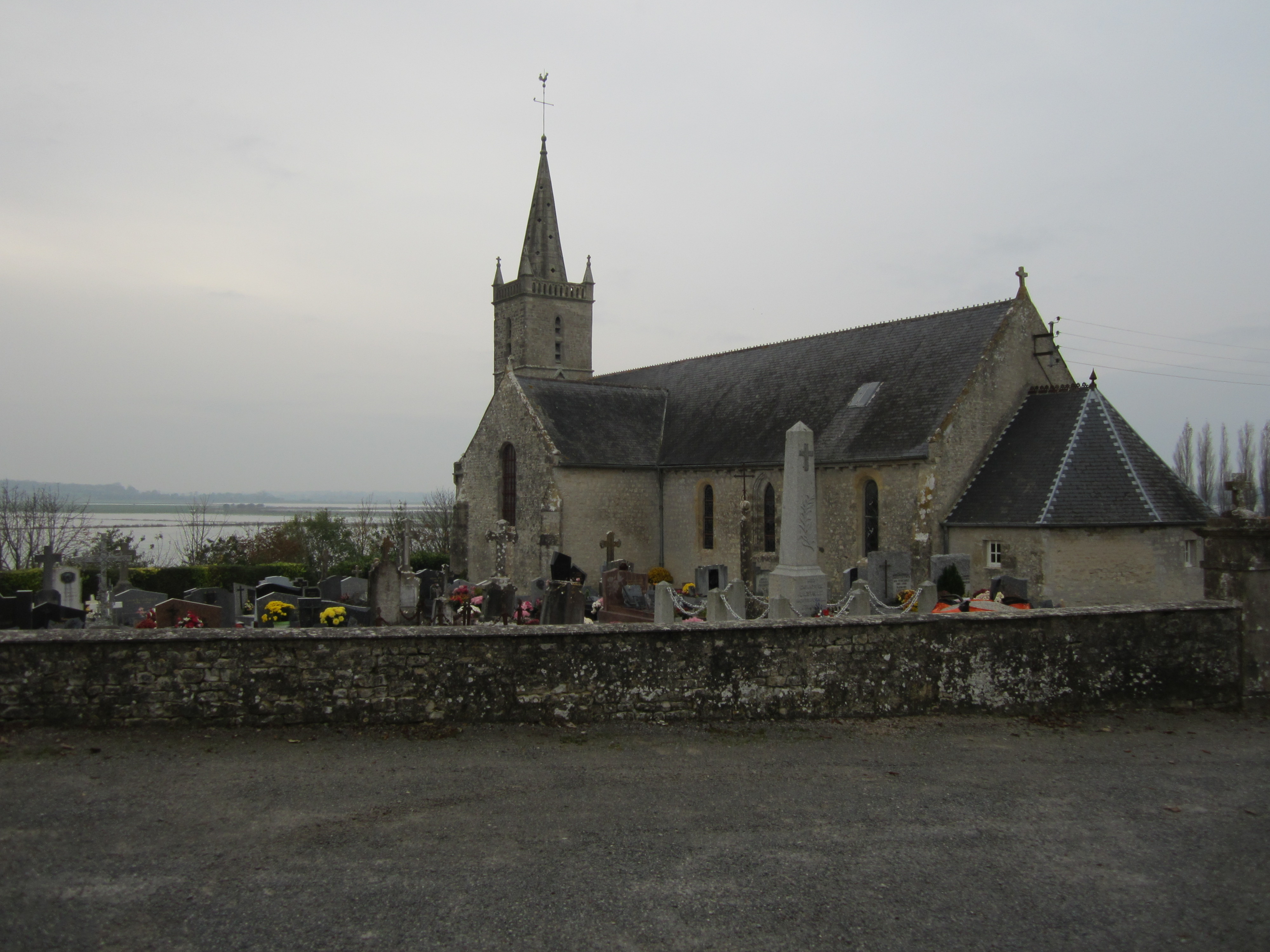
- The church of Saint-Martin
- Location of Liesville-sur-Douve
- Location within France Location within Normandy
- Coordinates: 49°21′16″N 1°19′12″W
- Country: France
- Region: Normandy
- Department: Manche
- Arrondissement: Cherbourg
- Canton: Carentan-les-Marais
- Intercommunality: La Baie du Cotentin

Government
  - Mayor (2020–2026): Sonia La Dune
- Area^{1}: 5.24 km^{2} (2.02 sq mi)
- Elevation: 5 m (16 ft)
- Highest elevation: 18 m (59 ft)
- Lowest elevation: 2 m (6.6 ft)
- Population (2023): 218
  - Density: 41.6/km^{2} (108/sq mi)
- Time zone: UTC+01:00 (CET)
  - Summer (DST): UTC+02:00 (CEST)
- INSEE/Postal code: 50269 /50480
- ^{1} French Land Register data, which excludes lakes, ponds, glaciers > 1 km^{2} (0.386 sq mi or 247 acres) and river estuaries.

Liesville-sur-Douve (French pronunciation: [ljɛvil syʁ duv], literally Liesville on Douve) is a commune in the Manche department in Normandy in north-western France.

== See also ==
- Communes of the Manche department
