= Baupte =

- Commune
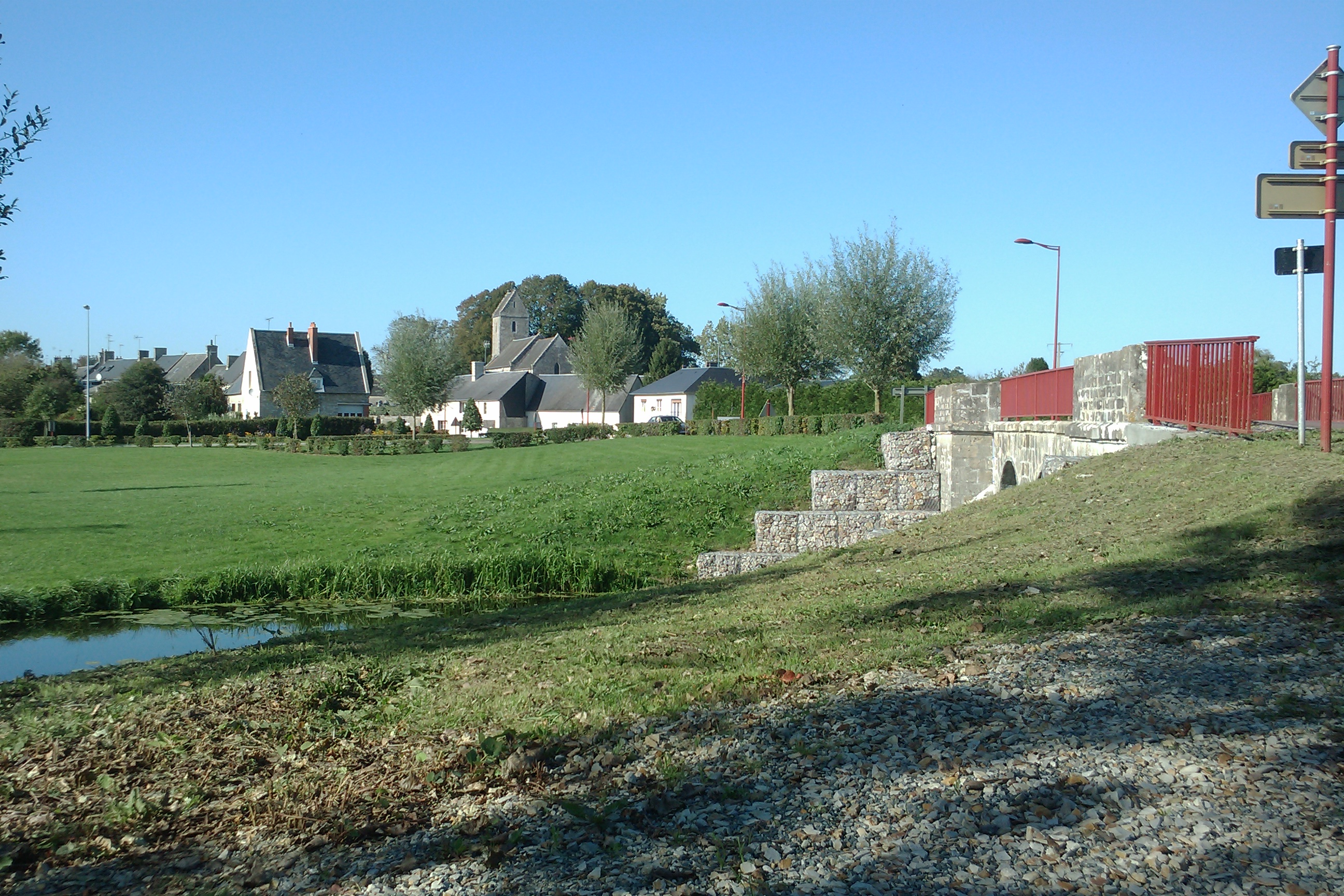
- Baupte from the bridge over the Sèves
- Location of Baupte
- Location within France Location within Normandy
- Coordinates: 49°18′32″N 1°21′36″W
- Country: France
- Region: Normandy
- Department: Manche
- Arrondissement: Coutances
- Canton: Carentan-les-Marais
- Intercommunality: Baie du Cotentin

Government
  - Mayor (2020–2026): Daniel Thomas
- Area^{1}: 2.29 km^{2} (0.88 sq mi)
- Elevation: 20 m (66 ft)
- Highest elevation: 26 m (85 ft)
- Lowest elevation: 2 m (6.6 ft)
- Population (2023): 436
  - Density: 190/km^{2} (493/sq mi)
- Time zone: UTC+01:00 (CET)
  - Summer (DST): UTC+02:00 (CEST)
- INSEE/Postal code: 50036 /50500
- ^{1} French Land Register data, which excludes lakes, ponds, glaciers > 1 km^{2} (0.386 sq mi or 247 acres) and river estuaries.

Baupte (French pronunciation: [bot]) is a commune in the northwestern French department of Manche, a part of Normandy.

== Population ==
Historical population
Year	Pop.	±% p.a.
1968	422	—
1975	501	+2.48%
1982	520	+0.53%
1990	431	−2.32%
1999	422	−0.23%
2007	434	+0.35%
2012	450	+0.73%
2017	431	−0.86%
2023	436	+0.19%
Source: INSEE

== See also ==
- Communes of the Manche department
