= Auvers, Manche =

Auvers
- Commune
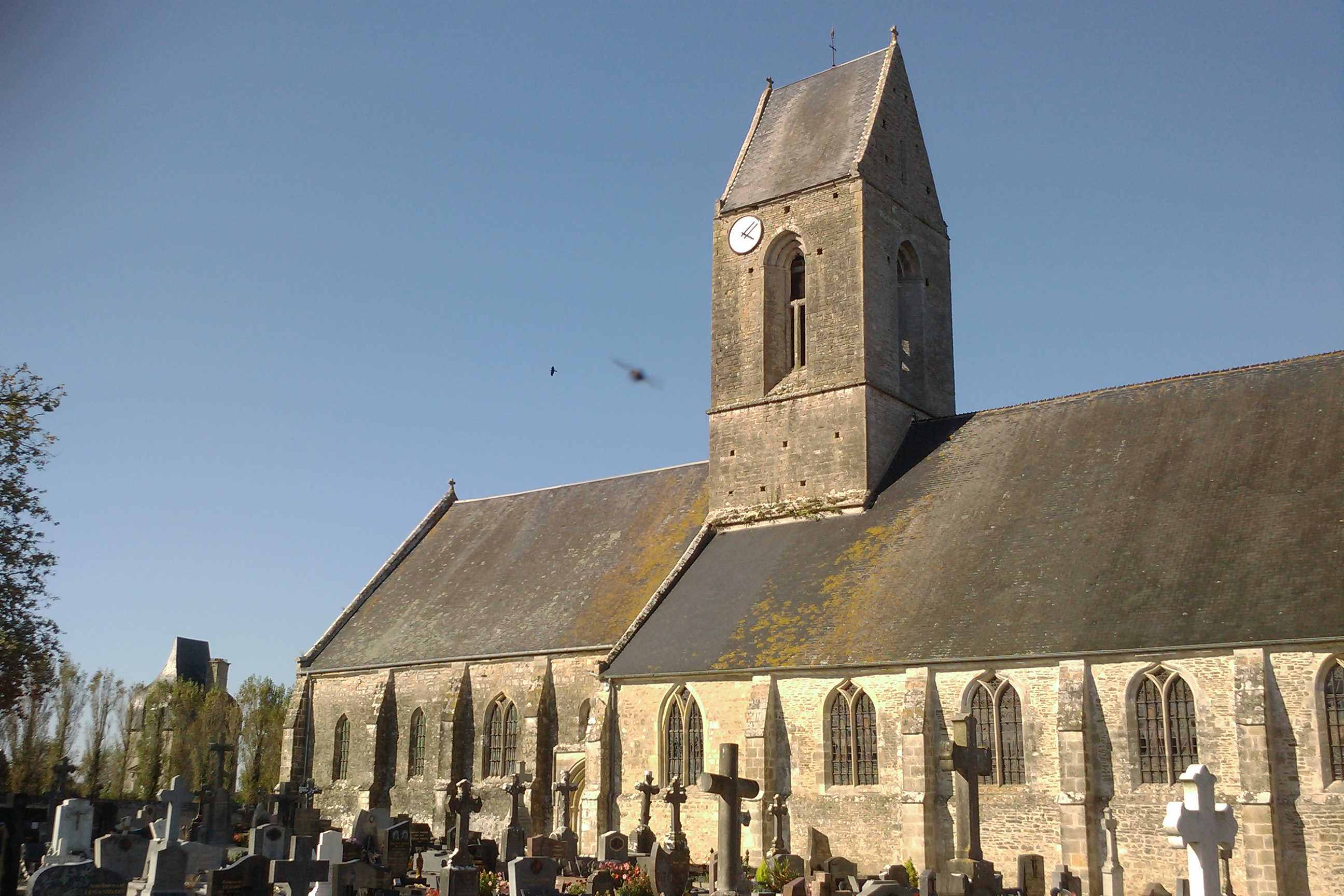
- Saint-Étienne church and the château
- Location of Auvers
- Location within France Location within Normandy
- Coordinates: 49°17′59″N 1°19′07″W
- Country: France
- Region: Normandy
- Department: Manche
- Arrondissement: Saint-Lô
- Canton: Carentan-les-Marais
- Intercommunality: CC Baie Cotentin

Government
  - Mayor (2020–2026): Yves Poisson
- Area^{1}: 18.76 km^{2} (7.24 sq mi)
- Elevation: 5 m (16 ft)
- Highest elevation: 26 m (85 ft)
- Lowest elevation: 0 m (0 ft)
- Population (2023): 683
  - Density: 36.4/km^{2} (94.3/sq mi)
- Time zone: UTC+01:00 (CET)
  - Summer (DST): UTC+02:00 (CEST)
- INSEE/Postal code: 50023 /50500
- ^{1} French Land Register data, which excludes lakes, ponds, glaciers > 1 km^{2} (0.386 sq mi or 247 acres) and river estuaries.

Auvers (French pronunciation: [ovɛʁ]) is a commune in the Manche department in the Normandy region in northwestern France.

== Population ==
Historical population
Year	Pop.	±% p.a.
1968	627	—
1975	573	−1.28%
1982	563	−0.25%
1990	571	+0.18%
1999	589	+0.35%
2007	653	+1.30%
2012	668	+0.46%
2017	675	+0.21%
2023	683	+0.20%
Source: INSEE

== See also ==
- Communes of the Manche department
