= Saint-Germain-de-Varreville =

- Commune
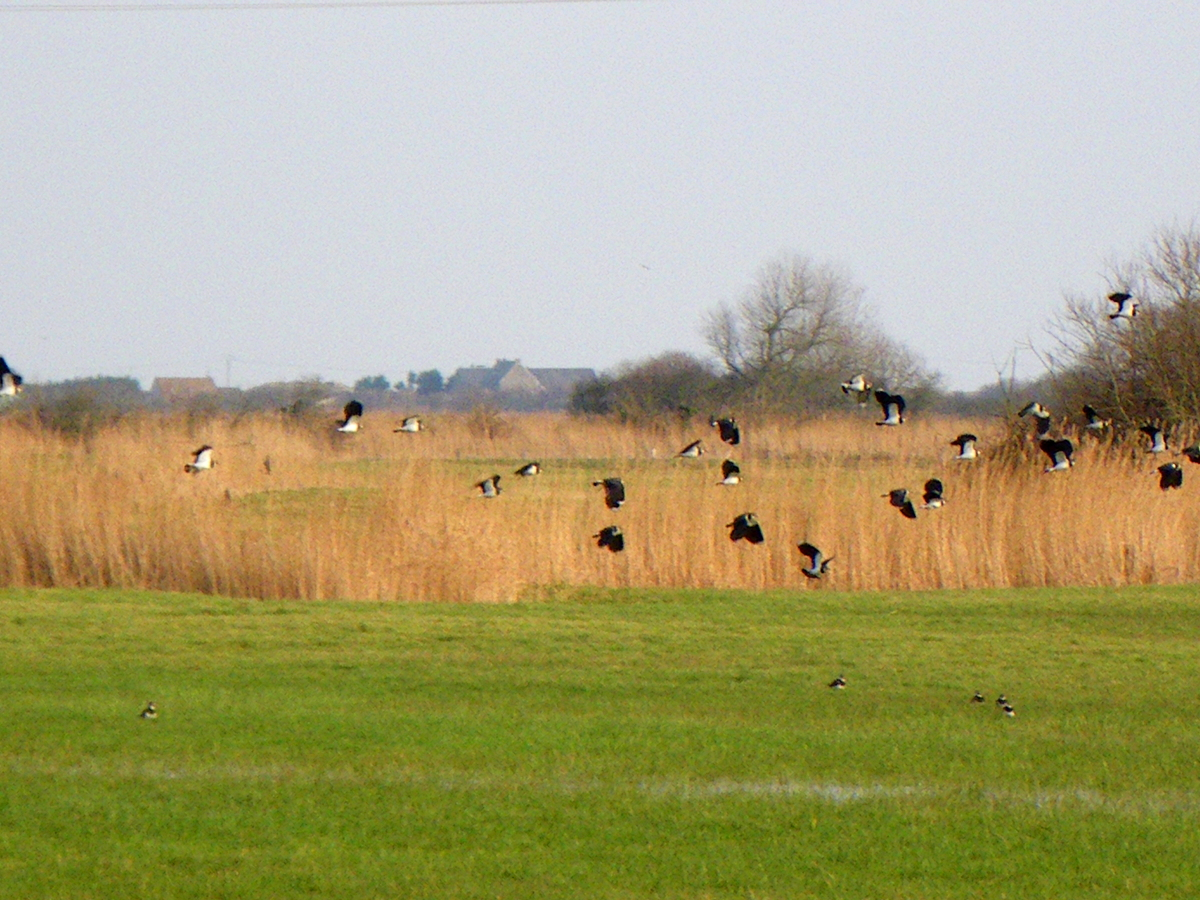
- Lapwings in the marshes
- Location of Saint-Germain-de-Varreville
- Location within France Location within Normandy
- Coordinates: 49°26′19″N 1°15′20″W
- Country: France
- Region: Normandy
- Department: Manche
- Arrondissement: Cherbourg
- Canton: Carentan-les-Marais

Government
  - Mayor (2020–2026): Michel Haize
- Area^{1}: 5.81 km^{2} (2.24 sq mi)
- Elevation: 40 m (130 ft)
- Population (2023): 109
  - Density: 18.8/km^{2} (48.6/sq mi)
- Time zone: UTC+01:00 (CET)
  - Summer (DST): UTC+02:00 (CEST)
- INSEE/Postal code: 50479 /50480
- ^{1} French Land Register data, which excludes lakes, ponds, glaciers > 1 km^{2} (0.386 sq mi or 247 acres) and river estuaries.

Saint-Germain-de-Varreville (French pronunciation: [sɛ̃ ʒɛʁmɛ̃ də vaʁvil]) is a commune in the Manche department in Normandy in north-western France.

== See also ==
- Communes of the Manche department
