= Sébeville =

- Commune
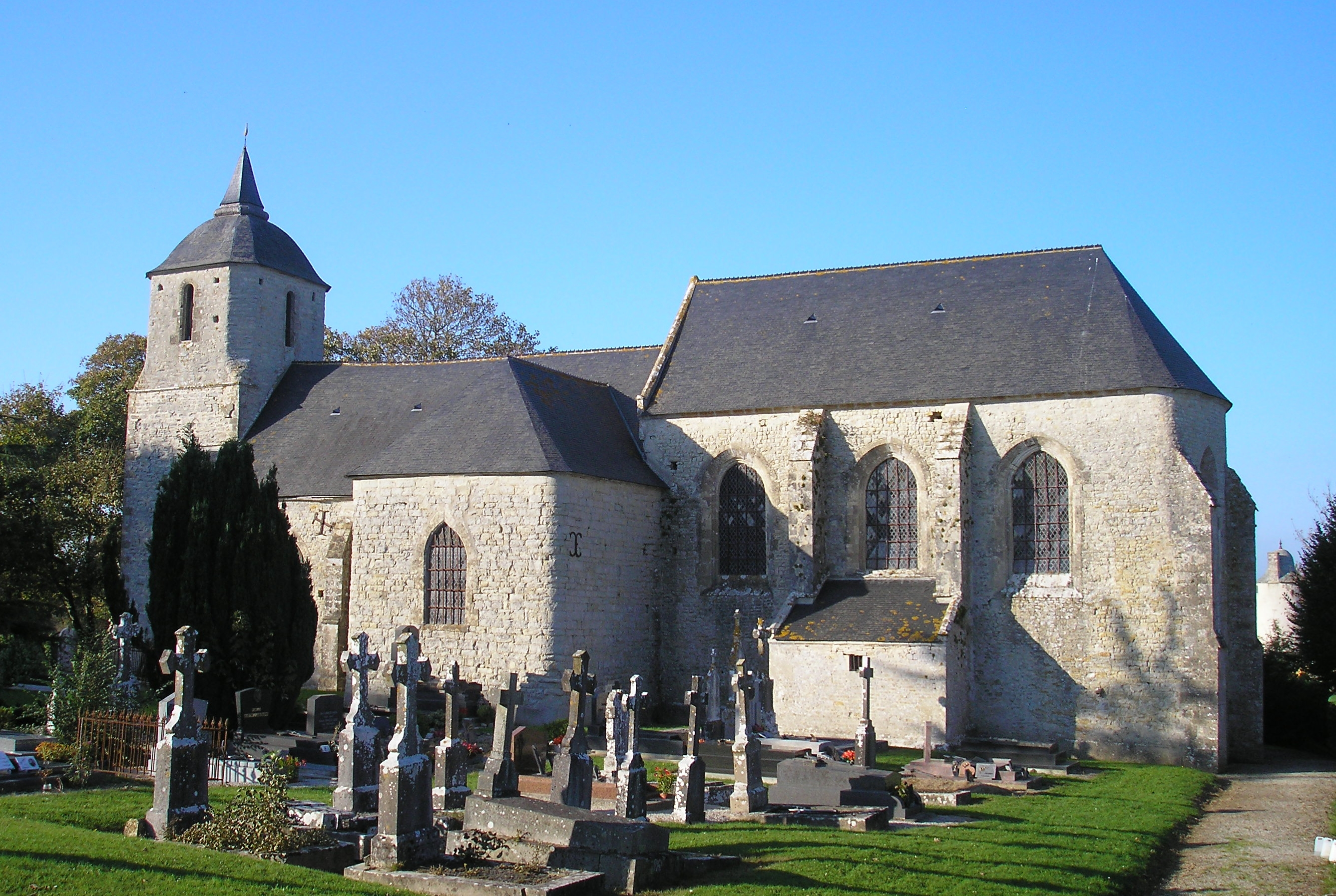
- The church of Saint-Pierre-et-Saint-Paul
- Location of Sébeville
- Location within France Location within Normandy
- Coordinates: 49°23′18″N 1°17′11″W
- Country: France
- Region: Normandy
- Department: Manche
- Arrondissement: Cherbourg
- Canton: Carentan-les-Marais
- Intercommunality: La Baie du Cotentin

Government
  - Mayor (2020–2026): Nathalie Lamare
- Area^{1}: 2.88 km^{2} (1.11 sq mi)
- Elevation: 35 m (115 ft)
- Highest elevation: 38 m (125 ft)
- Lowest elevation: 3 m (9.8 ft)
- Population (2023): 34
  - Density: 12/km^{2} (31/sq mi)
- Time zone: UTC+01:00 (CET)
  - Summer (DST): UTC+02:00 (CEST)
- INSEE/Postal code: 50571 /50480
- ^{1} French Land Register data, which excludes lakes, ponds, glaciers > 1 km^{2} (0.386 sq mi or 247 acres) and river estuaries.

Sébeville is a commune in the Manche department in Normandy in north-western France.

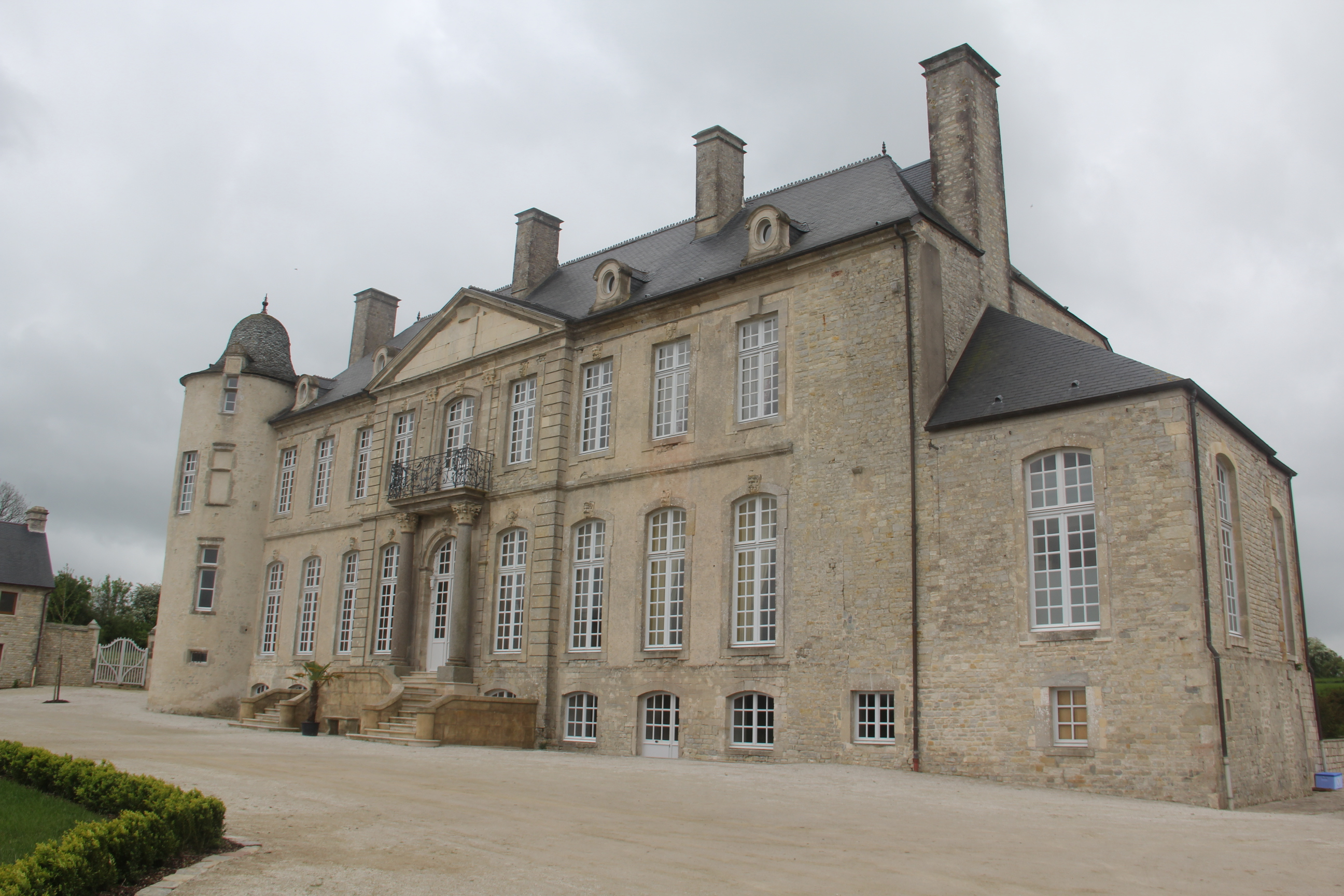
Chateau Sebeville

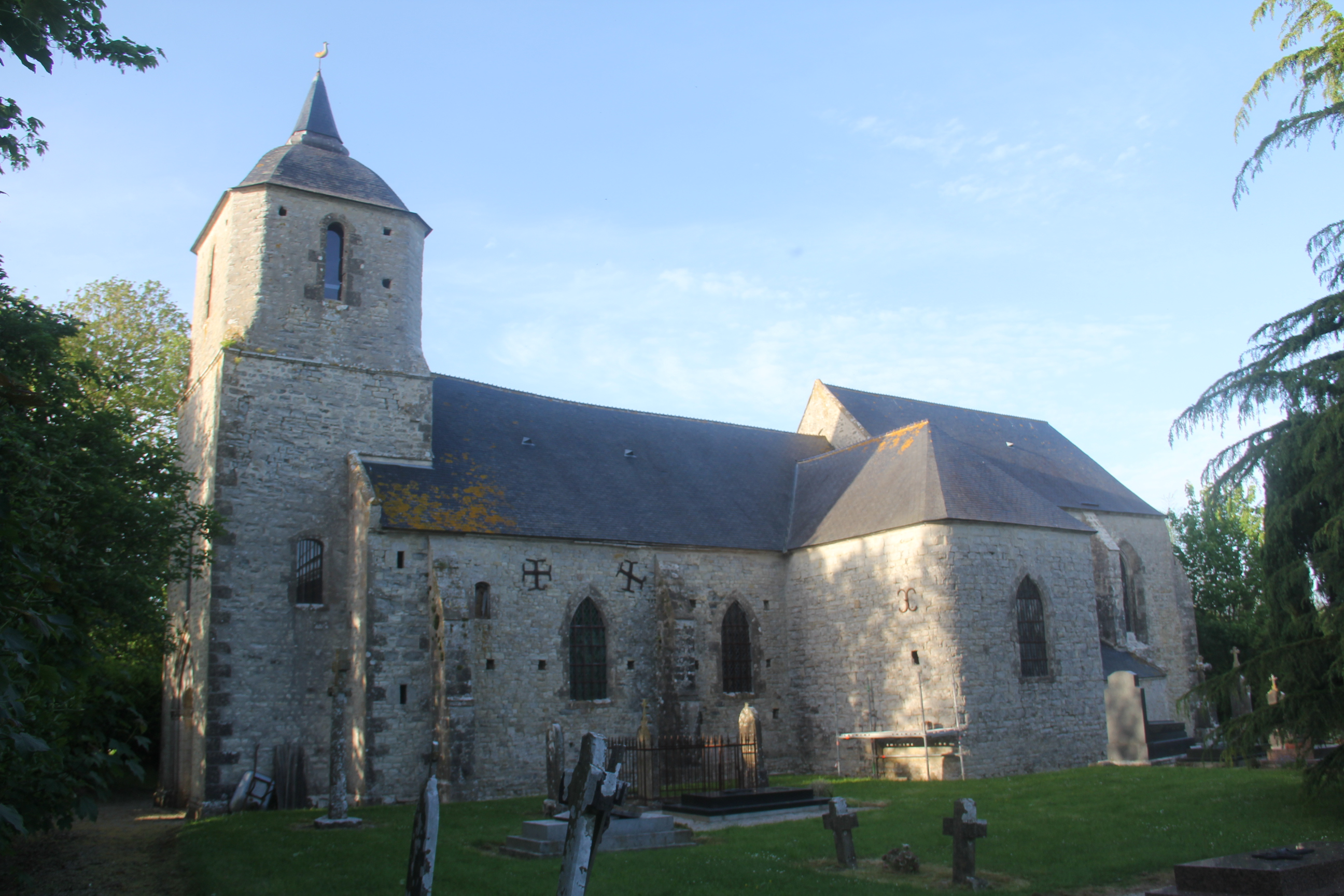
Sebeville Church

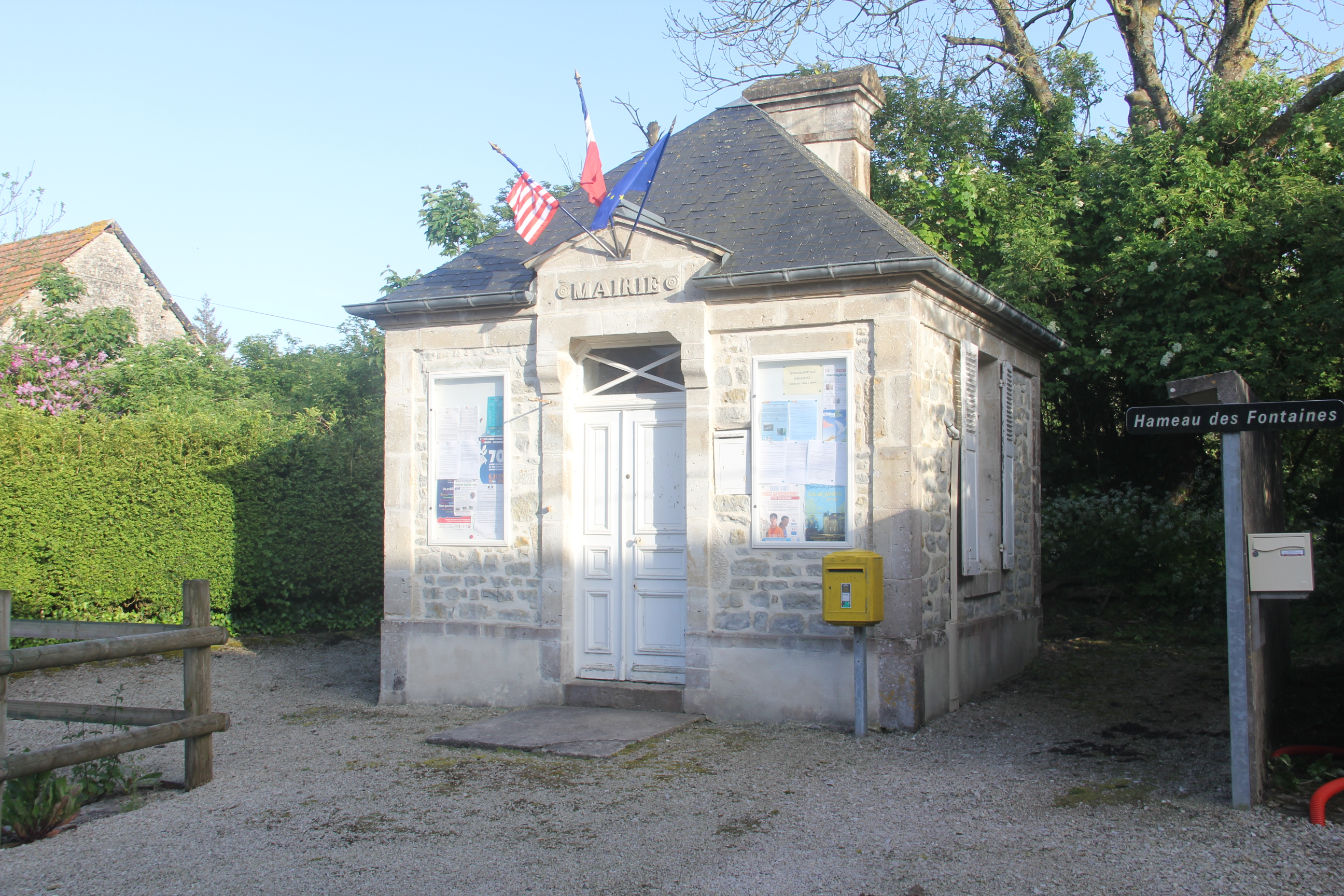
Town Hall in Sebeville

== See also ==
- Communes of the Manche department
