= Appeville =

- Commune
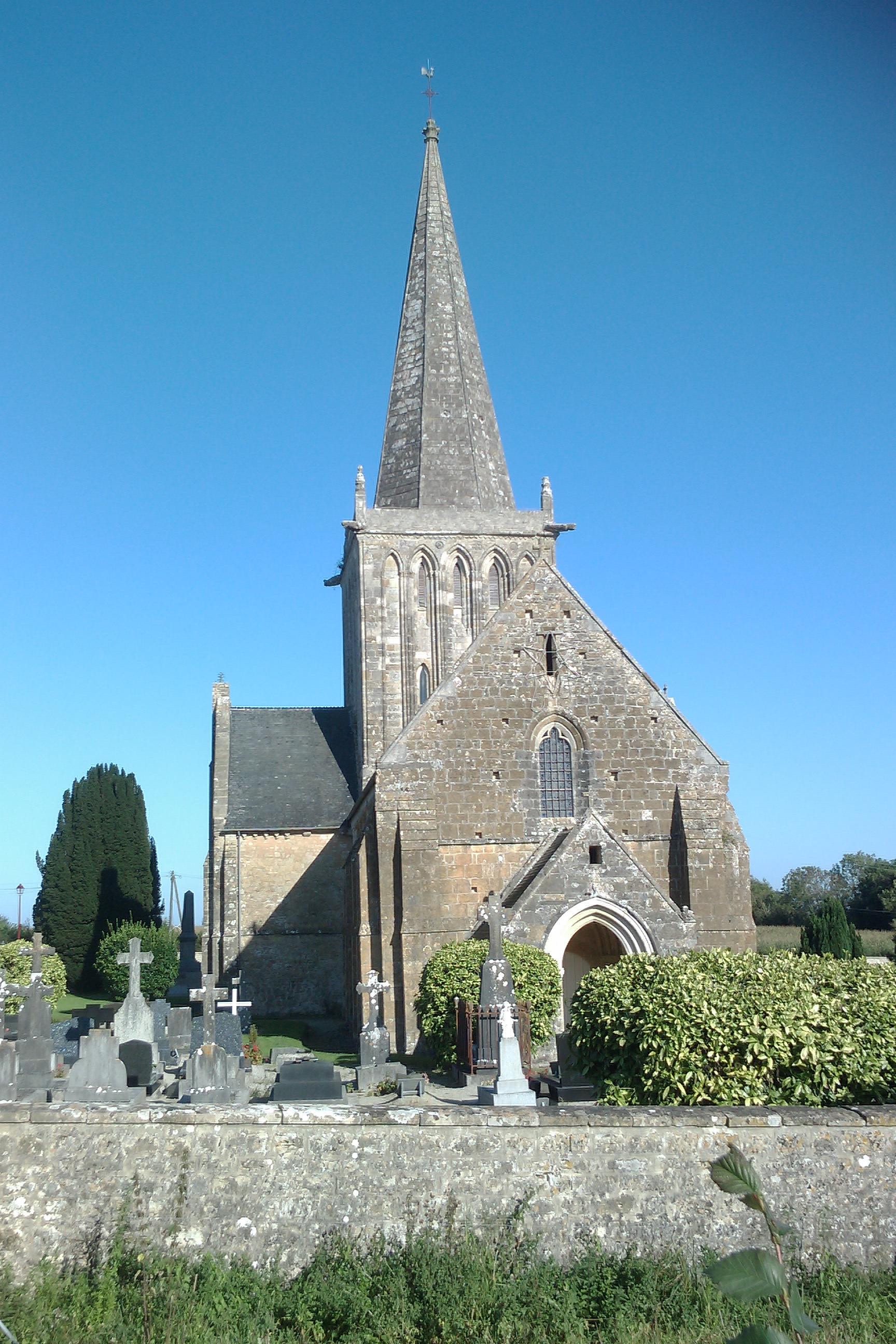
- Appeville church
- Location of Appeville
- Location within France Location within Normandy
- Coordinates: 49°19′21″N 1°20′30″W
- Country: France
- Region: Normandy
- Department: Manche
- Arrondissement: Coutances
- Canton: Carentan-les-Marais

Government
  - Mayor (2020–2026): Michel Leblanc
- Area^{1}: 13.2 km^{2} (5.1 sq mi)
- Elevation: 10 m (33 ft)
- Highest elevation: 34 m (112 ft)
- Lowest elevation: 0 m (0 ft)
- Population (2023): 200
  - Density: 15/km^{2} (39/sq mi)
- Time zone: UTC+01:00 (CET)
  - Summer (DST): UTC+02:00 (CEST)
- INSEE/Postal code: 50016 /50500
- ^{1} French Land Register data, which excludes lakes, ponds, glaciers > 1 km^{2} (0.386 sq mi or 247 acres) and river estuaries.

Appeville (French pronunciation: [apvil]) is a commune in the Manche department in the Normandy region in northwestern France.

== Population ==
Historical population
| Year | Pop. | ±% p.a. |
|---|---|---|
| 1968 | 319 | — |
| 1975 | 273 | −2.20% |
| 1982 | 243 | −1.65% |
| 1990 | 202 | −2.28% |
| 1999 | 222 | +1.05% |
| 2007 | 211 | −0.63% |
| 2012 | 192 | −1.87% |
| 2017 | 178 | −1.50% |
| 2023 | 200 | +1.96% |
Source: INSEE

== See also ==
- Communes of the Manche department
