= Audouville-la-Hubert =

- Commune
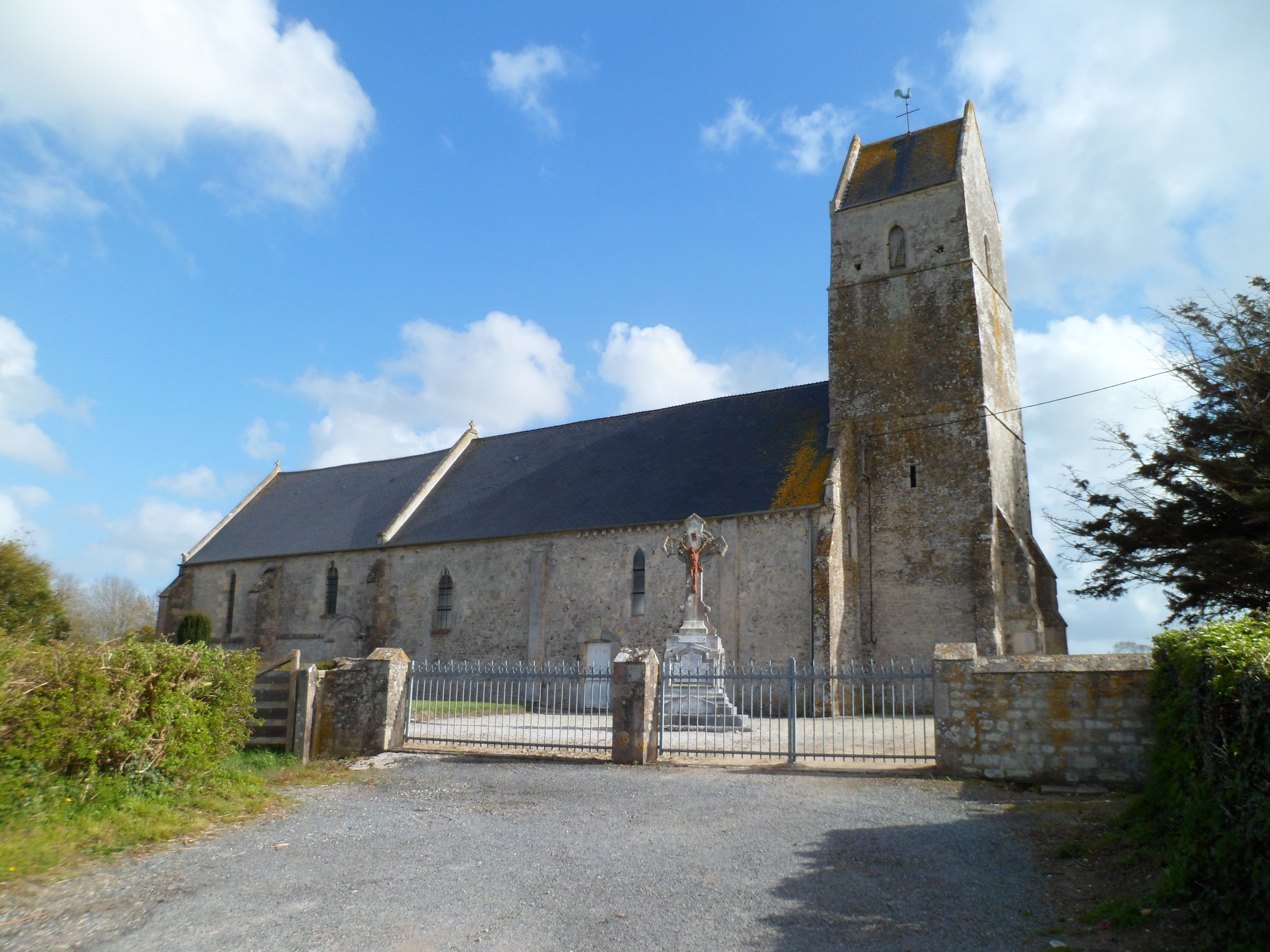
- Sainte-Honorine church
- Location of Audouville-la-Hubert
- Location within France Location within Normandy
- Coordinates: 49°24′33″N 1°14′27″W
- Country: France
- Region: Normandy
- Department: Manche
- Arrondissement: Cherbourg
- Canton: Carentan-les-Marais
- Intercommunality: CC Baie Cotentin

Government
  - Mayor (2020–2026): Dominique Mesnil
- Area^{1}: 6.40 km^{2} (2.47 sq mi)
- Highest elevation: 22 m (72 ft)
- Lowest elevation: 1 m (3.3 ft)
- Population (2023): 78
  - Density: 12/km^{2} (32/sq mi)
- Time zone: UTC+01:00 (CET)
  - Summer (DST): UTC+02:00 (CEST)
- INSEE/Postal code: 50021 /50480
- ^{1} French Land Register data, which excludes lakes, ponds, glaciers > 1 km^{2} (0.386 sq mi or 247 acres) and river estuaries.

Audouville-la-Hubert (French pronunciation: [oduvil la ybɛʁ]) is a commune in the Manche department in the Normandy region in northwestern France.

== History ==
In 1944, thirty German prisoners of war were massacred near the village of Audouville-la-Hubert by American paratroopers in an act of revenge after they suffered a high number of casualties during the Battle of Normandy.

== Population ==
Historical population
| Year | Pop. | ±% p.a. |
|---|---|---|
| 1968 | 128 | — |
| 1975 | 129 | +0.11% |
| 1982 | 93 | −4.57% |
| 1990 | 97 | +0.53% |
| 1999 | 83 | −1.72% |
| 2007 | 64 | −3.20% |
| 2012 | 64 | +0.00% |
| 2017 | 79 | +4.30% |
| 2023 | 78 | −0.21% |
Source: INSEE

== See also ==
- Communes of the Manche department
