= Turqueville =

- Commune
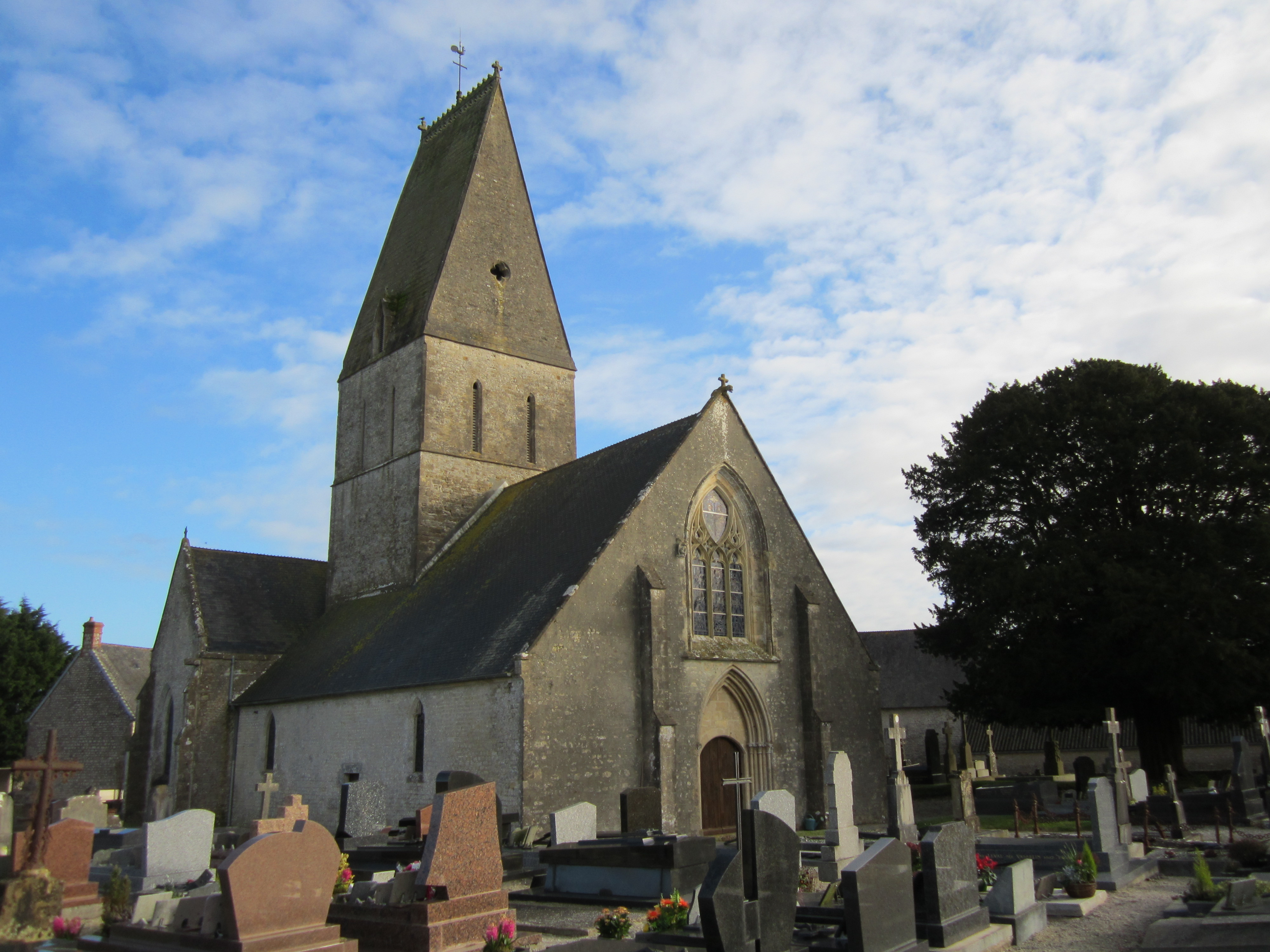
- The church of Notre-Dame
- Location of Turqueville
- Location within France Location within Normandy
- Coordinates: 49°24′20″N 1°16′31″W
- Country: France
- Region: Normandy
- Department: Manche
- Arrondissement: Cherbourg
- Canton: Carentan-les-Marais
- Intercommunality: La Baie du Cotentin

Government
  - Mayor (2022–2026): Alain Noël
- Area^{1}: 5.21 km^{2} (2.01 sq mi)
- Elevation: 11 m (36 ft)
- Highest elevation: 42 m (138 ft)
- Lowest elevation: 3 m (9.8 ft)
- Population (2023): 129
  - Density: 24.8/km^{2} (64.1/sq mi)
- Time zone: UTC+01:00 (CET)
  - Summer (DST): UTC+02:00 (CEST)
- INSEE/Postal code: 50609 /50480
- ^{1} French Land Register data, which excludes lakes, ponds, glaciers > 1 km^{2} (0.386 sq mi or 247 acres) and river estuaries.

Turqueville (French pronunciation: [tyʁkəvil]) is a commune in the Manche department in Normandy in north-western France.

== See also ==
- Communes of the Manche department
