= Blosville =

- Commune
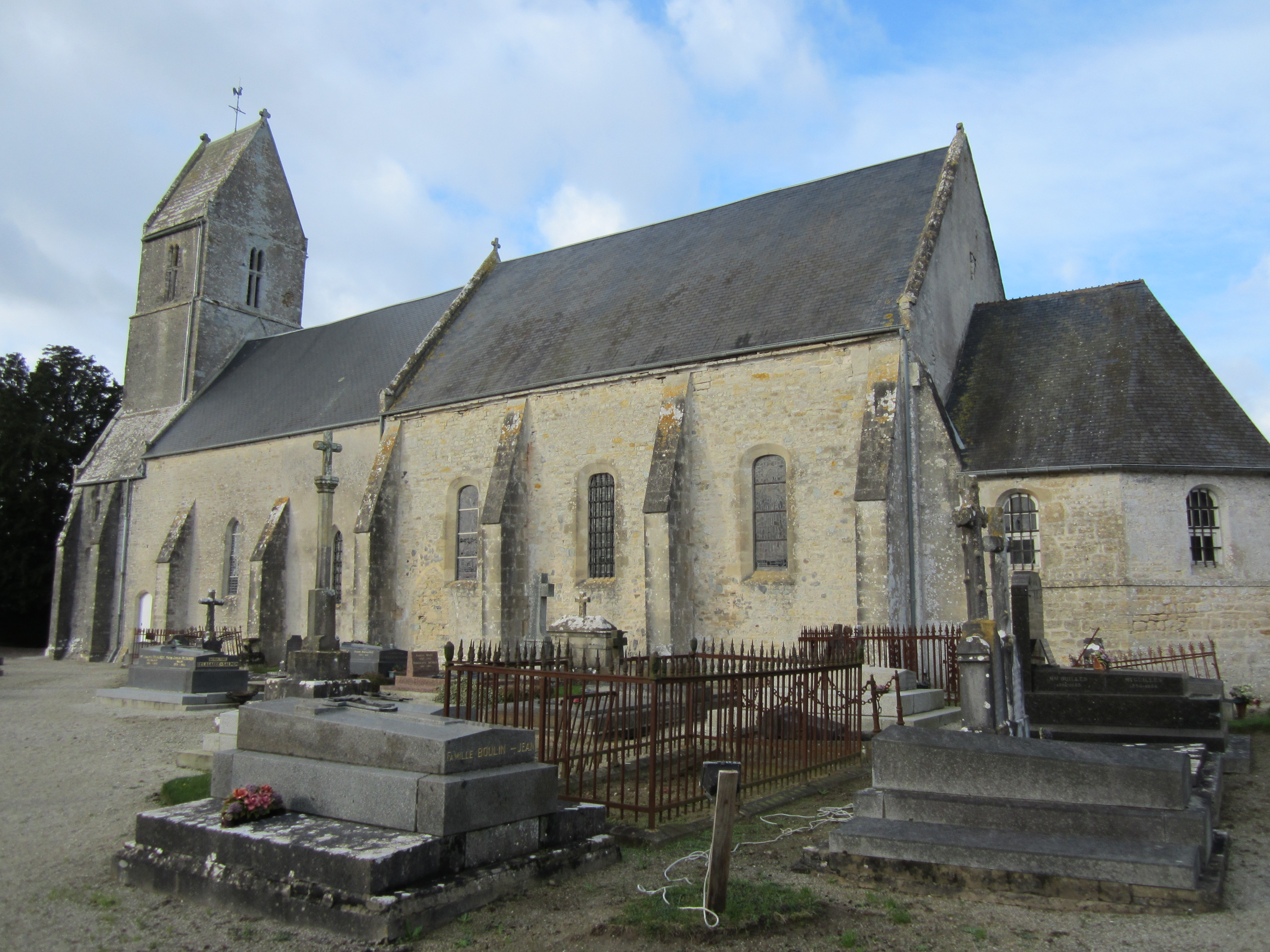
- The church of Saint-Christophe
- Location of Blosville
- Location within France Location within Normandy
- Coordinates: 49°22′27″N 1°17′21″W
- Country: France
- Region: Normandy
- Department: Manche
- Arrondissement: Cherbourg
- Canton: Carentan-les-Marais

Government
  - Mayor (2020–2026): Adolphe Mouchel
- Area^{1}: 4.22 km^{2} (1.63 sq mi)
- Elevation: 33 m (108 ft)
- Highest elevation: 35 m (115 ft)
- Lowest elevation: 2 m (6.6 ft)
- Population (2023): 310
  - Density: 73/km^{2} (190/sq mi)
- Time zone: UTC+01:00 (CET)
  - Summer (DST): UTC+02:00 (CEST)
- INSEE/Postal code: 50059 /50480
- ^{1} French Land Register data, which excludes lakes, ponds, glaciers > 1 km^{2} (0.386 sq mi or 247 acres) and river estuaries.

Blosville (French pronunciation: [blovil]) is a commune in the Manche department in the Normandy region in northwestern France.

== Population ==
Historical population
| Year | Pop. | ±% p.a. |
|---|---|---|
| 1968 | 296 | — |
| 1975 | 241 | −2.89% |
| 1982 | 210 | −1.95% |
| 1990 | 223 | +0.75% |
| 1999 | 206 | −0.88% |
| 2007 | 259 | +2.90% |
| 2012 | 289 | +2.22% |
| 2017 | 313 | +1.61% |
| 2023 | 310 | −0.16% |
Source: INSEE

== See also ==
- Communes of the Manche department
