= Boutteville =

- Commune
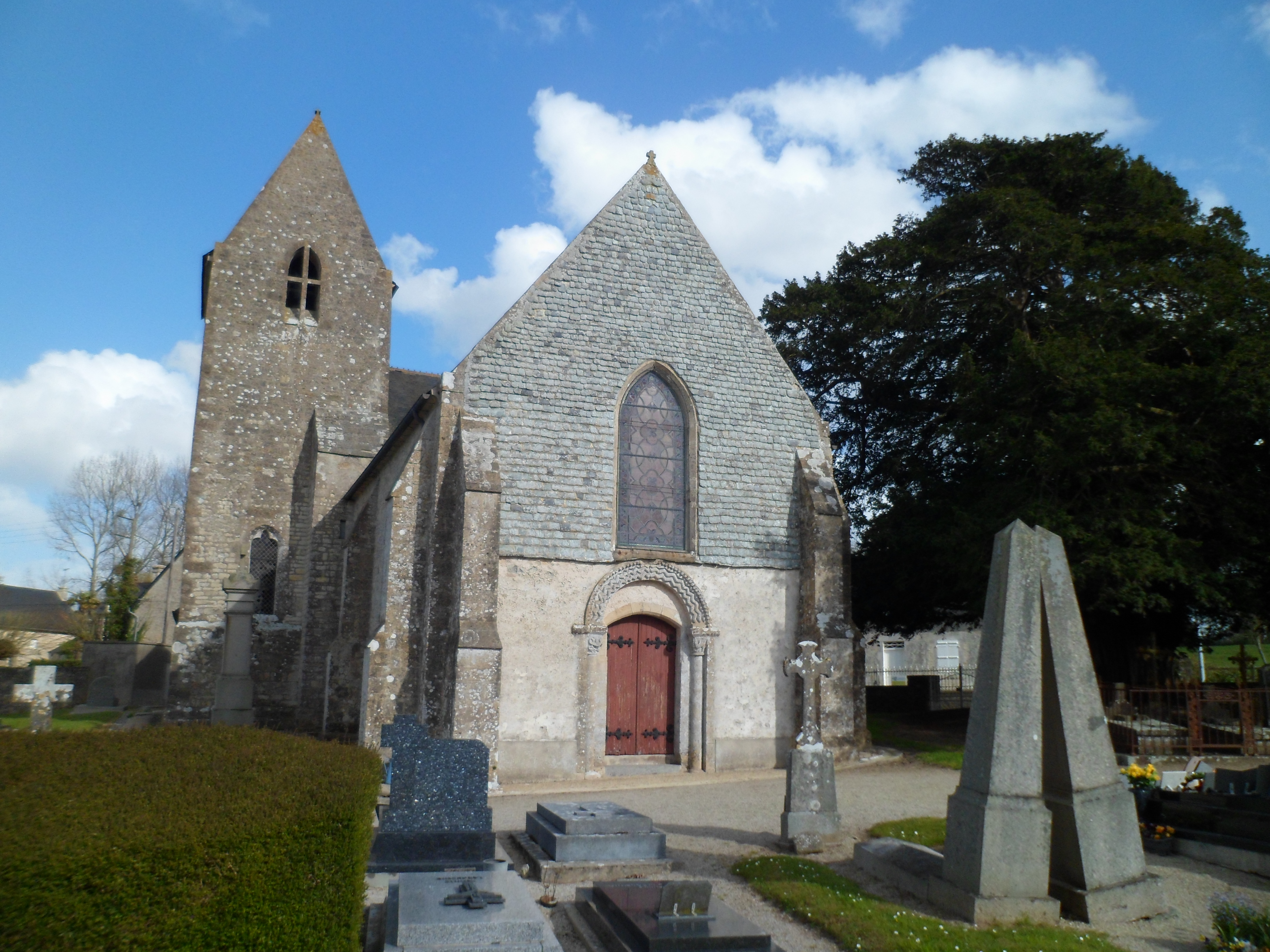
- The church of Saint-Hermeland
- Location of Boutteville
- Location within France Location within Normandy
- Coordinates: 49°23′24″N 1°15′28″W
- Country: France
- Region: Normandy
- Department: Manche
- Arrondissement: Cherbourg
- Canton: Carentan-les-Marais

Government
  - Mayor (2020–2026): Michel Jourdan
- Area^{1}: 1.82 km^{2} (0.70 sq mi)
- Elevation: 20 m (66 ft)
- Highest elevation: 38 m (125 ft)
- Lowest elevation: 3 m (9.8 ft)
- Population (2023): 57
  - Density: 31/km^{2} (81/sq mi)
- Time zone: UTC+01:00 (CET)
  - Summer (DST): UTC+02:00 (CEST)
- INSEE/Postal code: 50070 /50480
- ^{1} French Land Register data, which excludes lakes, ponds, glaciers > 1 km^{2} (0.386 sq mi or 247 acres) and river estuaries.

Boutteville (French pronunciation: [butvil]) is a commune in the Manche department in Normandy in northwestern France.

== Population ==
Historical population
Year	Pop.	±% p.a.
1968	72	—
1975	56	−3.53%
1982	64	+1.93%
1990	51	−2.80%
1999	62	+2.19%
2007	56	−1.26%
2012	58	+0.70%
2017	73	+4.71%
2023	57	−4.04%
Source: INSEE

== See also ==
- Communes of the Manche department
