= Canton of Carentan-les-Marais =

Coordinates: 49°16′48″N 1°15′17″W

Carentan-les-Marais
- Canton
- Country: France
- Region: Normandy
- Department: Manche
- No. of communes: {{{nbcomm}}}

Government
  - Representatives (2021–2028): Maryse Le Goff; Hervé Marie
- Area: 389.31 km^{2} (150.31 sq mi)
- Population (2023): 21,438
  - Density: 55.067/km^{2} (142.62/sq mi)
- INSEE code: 50 05

The canton of Carentan-les-Marais (before March 2020: canton of Carentan) is an administrative division of the Manche department. Its borders were modified at the French canton reorganisation which came into effect in March 2015. Its seat is in Carentan-les-Marais.

== Composition ==
1. Appeville
2. Audouville-la-Hubert
3. Auvers
4. Baupte
5. Beuzeville-la-Bastille
6. Blosville
7. Boutteville
8. Carentan-les-Marais (partly)
9. Hiesville
10. Liesville-sur-Douve
11. Méautis
12. Neuville-au-Plain
13. Picauville
14. Saint-André-de-Bohon
15. Sainte-Marie-du-Mont
16. Sainte-Mère-Église
17. Saint-Germain-de-Varreville
18. Saint-Martin-de-Varreville
19. Sébeville
20. Terre-et-Marais
21. Turqueville

== Councillors ==
| Election | Councillors | Party | Occupation |
|---|---|---|---|
| 2015 | Maryse Le Goff | SE | Councillor of Carentan |
| 2015 | Marc Lefèvre | DVD | Former Mayor of Sainte-Mère-Église |

== Pictures of the canton ==
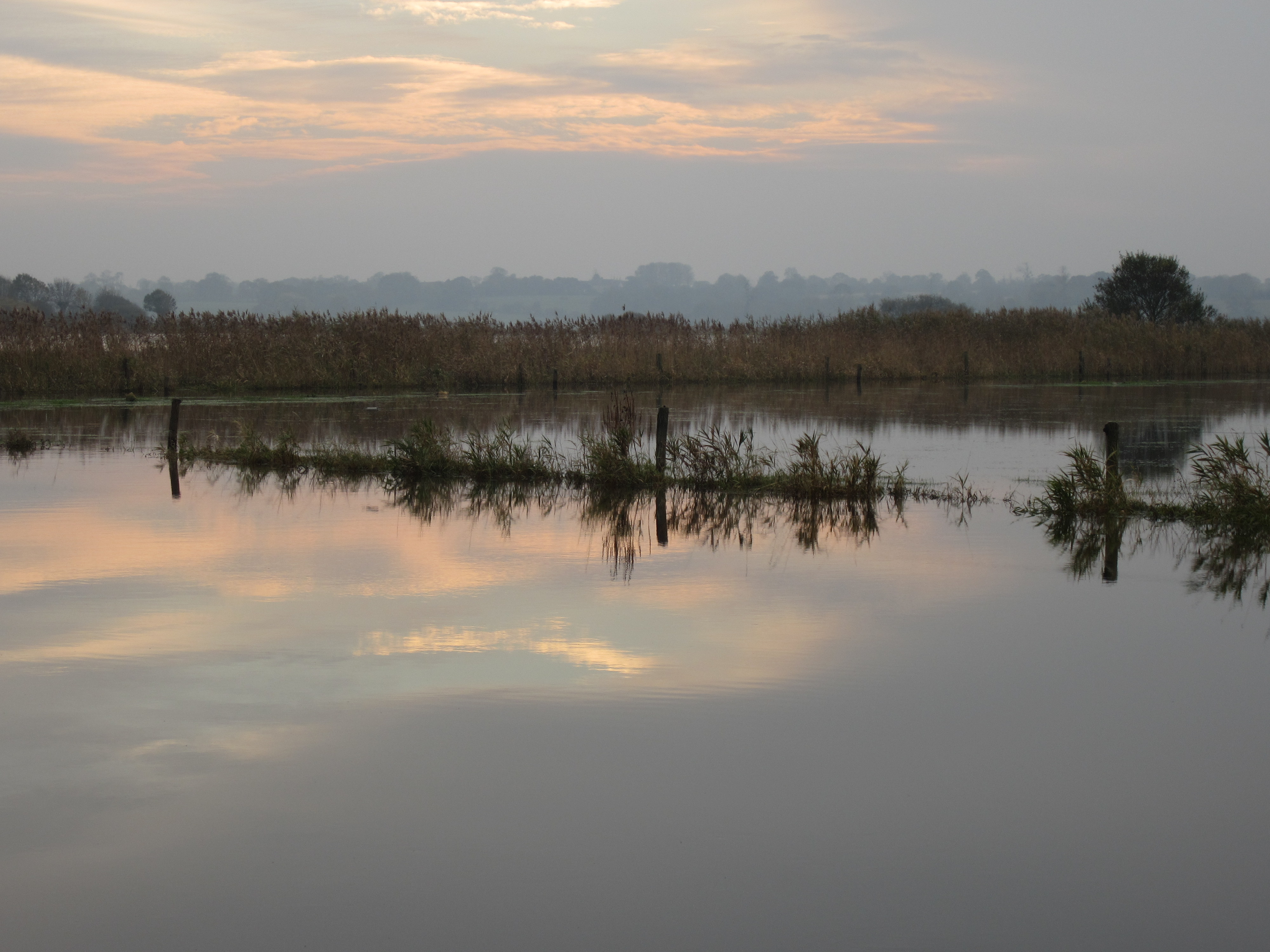
Marshes of Liesville-sur-Douve

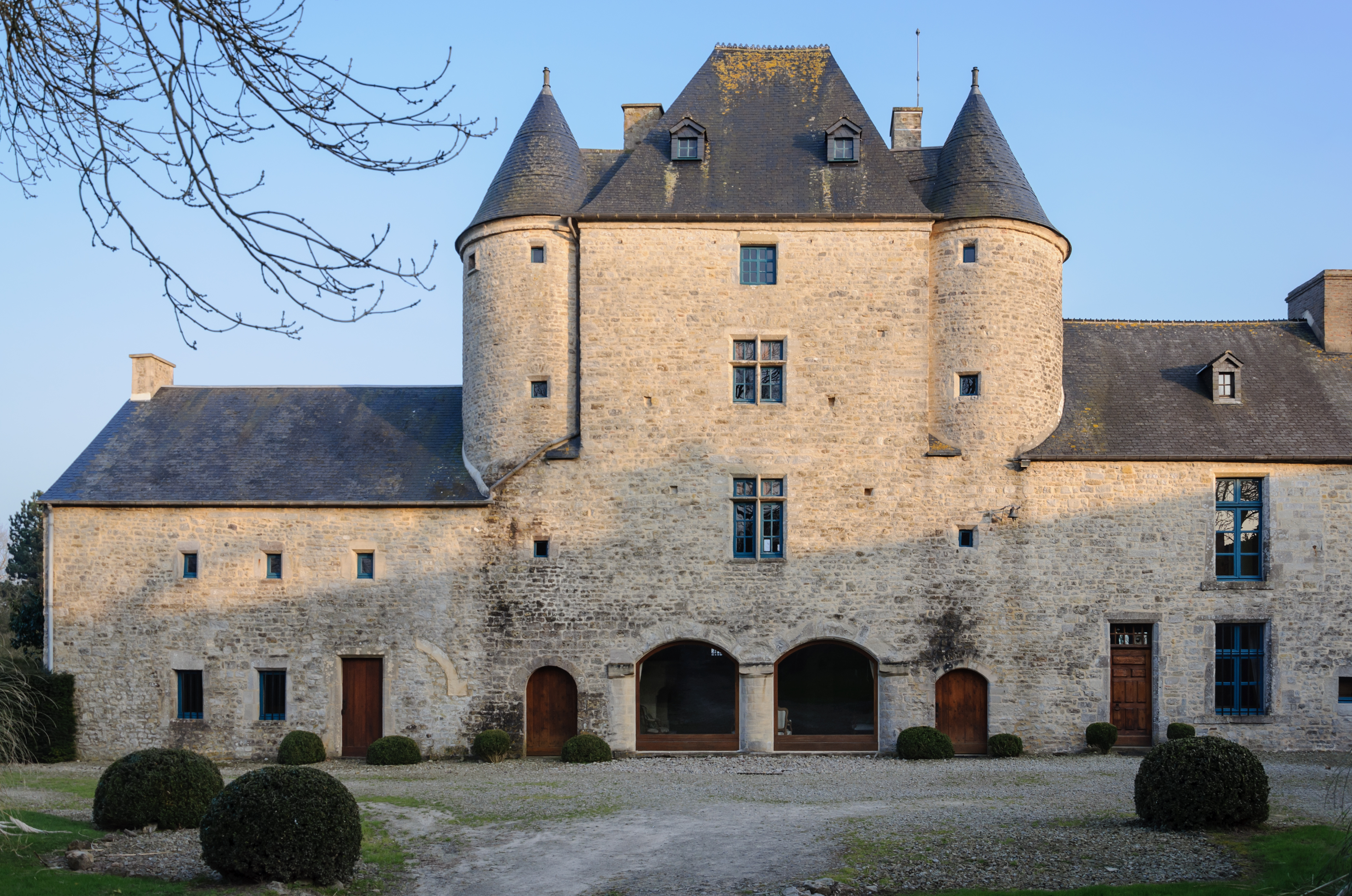
Castle of Sainte-Marie-du-Mont
