= Le Perron =

- Commune
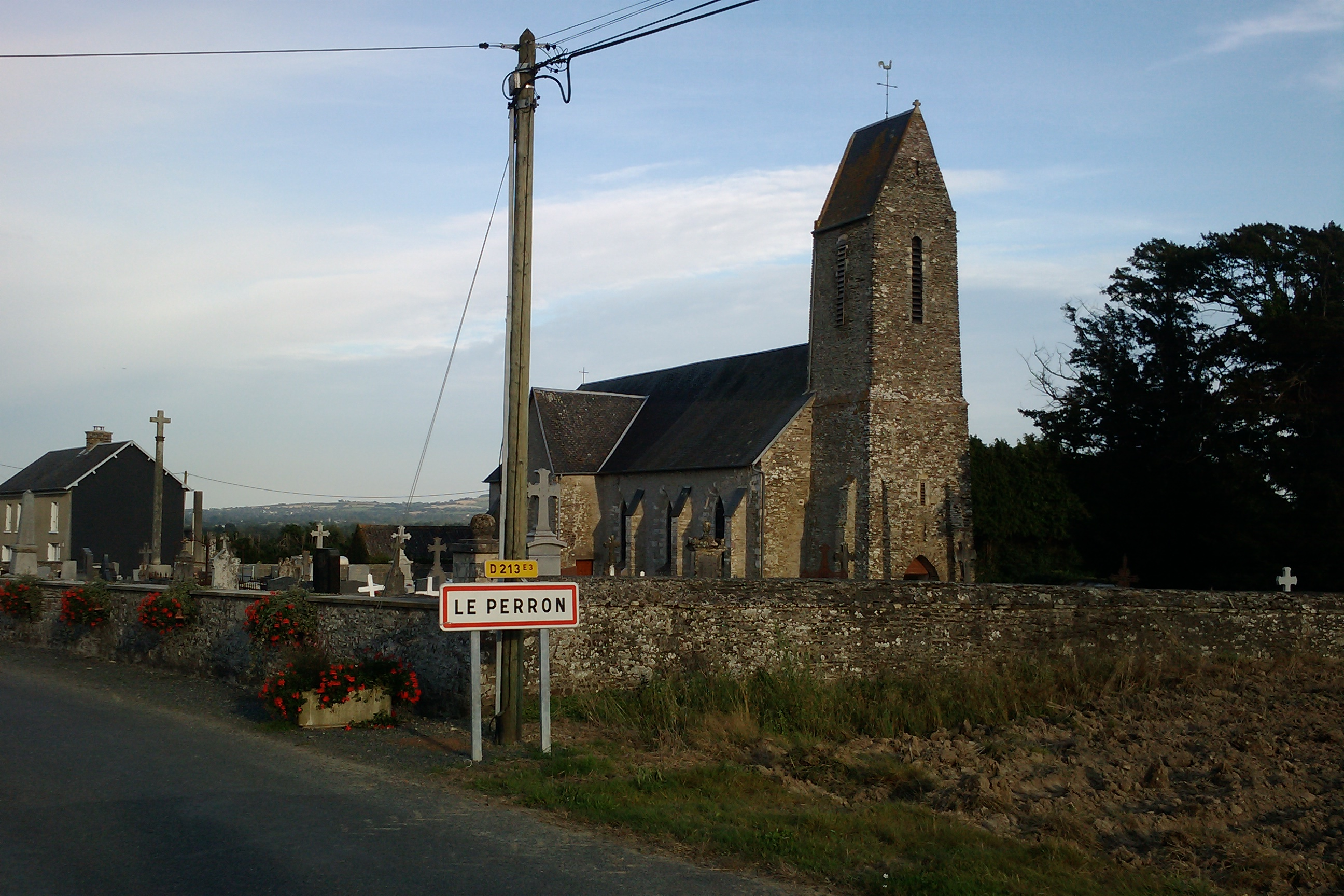
- The church
- Location of Le Perron
- Location within France Location within Normandy
- Coordinates: 49°03′11″N 0°54′01″W
- Country: France
- Region: Normandy
- Department: Manche
- Arrondissement: Saint-Lô
- Canton: Condé-sur-Vire
- Intercommunality: Saint-Lô Agglo

Government
  - Mayor (2020–2026): Yves Anquetil
- Area^{1}: 4.66 km^{2} (1.80 sq mi)
- Elevation: 80 m (260 ft)
- Highest elevation: 180 m (590 ft)
- Lowest elevation: 92 m (302 ft)
- Population (2023): 188
  - Density: 40.3/km^{2} (104/sq mi)
- Demonym: Perronnais
- Time zone: UTC+01:00 (CET)
  - Summer (DST): UTC+02:00 (CEST)
- INSEE/Postal code: 50398 /50160
- ^{1} French Land Register data, which excludes lakes, ponds, glaciers > 1 km^{2} (0.386 sq mi or 247 acres) and river estuaries.

Le Perron (French pronunciation: [lə pɛʁɔ̃]) is a commune in the Manche department in Normandy in north-western France.

== See also ==
- Communes of the Manche department
