= Saint-Maur-des-Bois =

- Commune
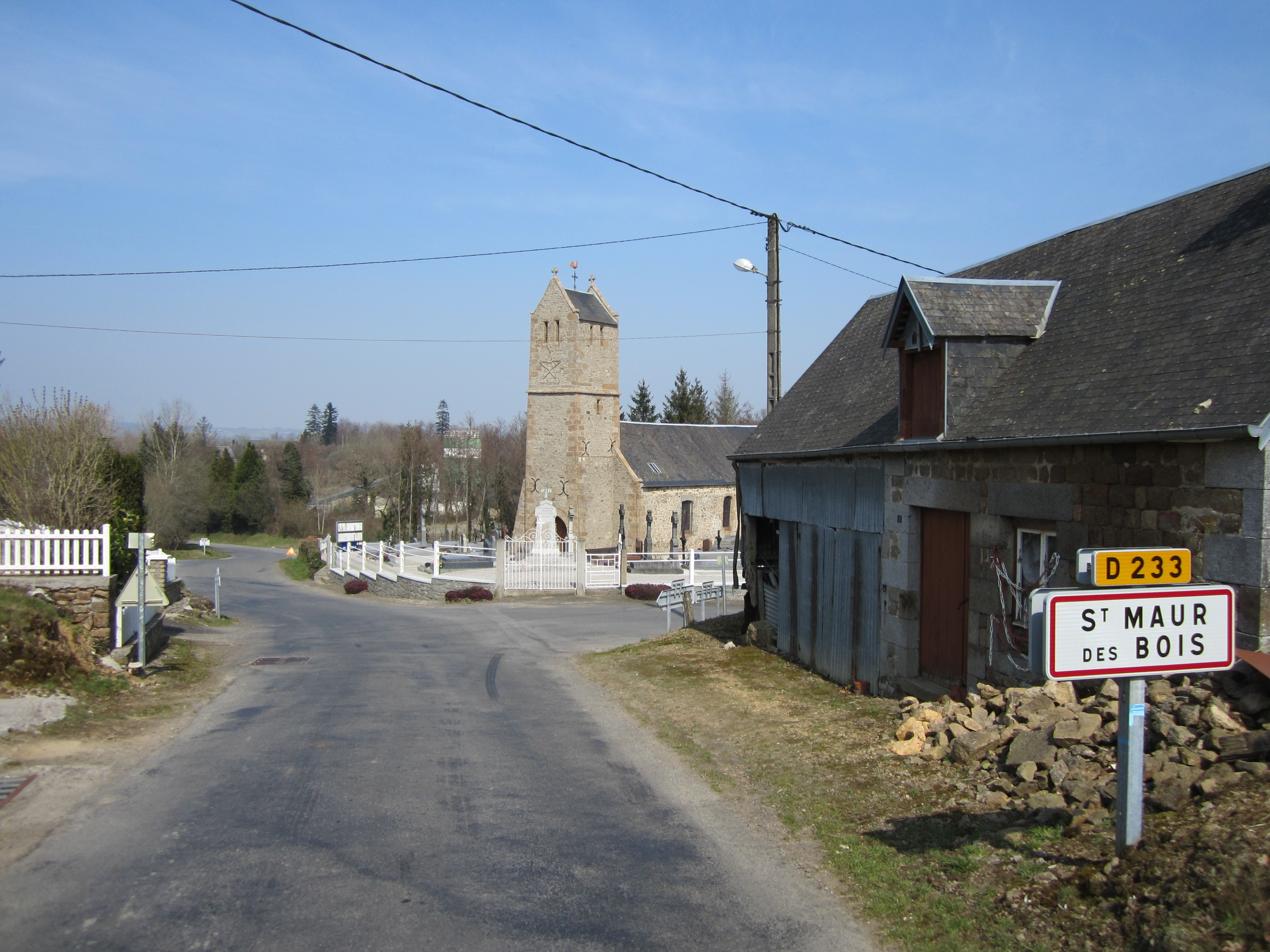
- The village and its church
- Location of Saint-Maur-des-Bois
- Location within France Location within Normandy
- Coordinates: 48°49′23″N 1°09′22″W
- Country: France
- Region: Normandy
- Department: Manche
- Arrondissement: Avranches
- Canton: Villedieu-les-Poêles-Rouffigny

Government
  - Mayor (2020–2026): Sylvie Marie
- Area^{1}: 4.97 km^{2} (1.92 sq mi)
- Elevation: 170 m (560 ft)
- Highest elevation: 239 m (784 ft)
- Lowest elevation: 129 m (423 ft)
- Population (2023): 153
  - Density: 30.8/km^{2} (79.7/sq mi)
- Time zone: UTC+01:00 (CET)
  - Summer (DST): UTC+02:00 (CEST)
- INSEE/Postal code: 50521 /50800
- ^{1} French Land Register data, which excludes lakes, ponds, glaciers > 1 km^{2} (0.386 sq mi or 247 acres) and river estuaries.

Saint-Maur-des-Bois (French pronunciation: [sɛ̃ mɔʁ de bwa]) is a commune in the Manche department in Normandy in north-western France, close to the border with the Calvados department.

It takes its name from Saint Maurus to whom the parish church is dedicated.

== See also ==
- Communes of the Manche department
