= La Lande-d'Airou =

- Commune
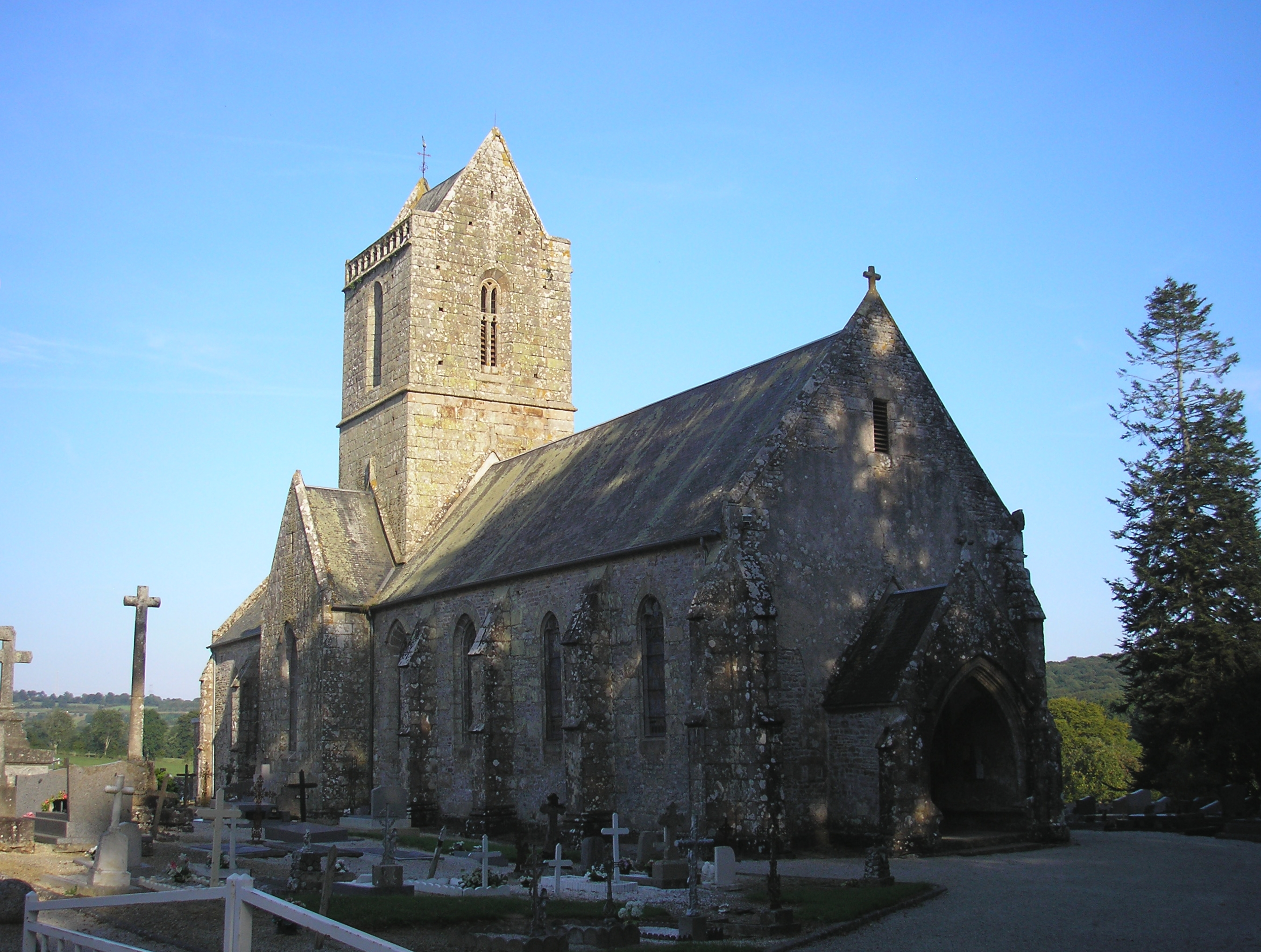
- The church of Saint-Martin
- Location of La Lande-d'Airou
- Location within France Location within Normandy
- Coordinates: 48°49′01″N 1°17′20″W
- Country: France
- Region: Normandy
- Department: Manche
- Arrondissement: Saint-Lô
- Canton: Villedieu-les-Poêles-Rouffigny
- Intercommunality: Villedieu Intercom

Government
  - Mayor (2020–2026): Christiane Graci
- Area^{1}: 15.10 km^{2} (5.83 sq mi)
- Elevation: 99 m (325 ft)
- Highest elevation: 215 m (705 ft)
- Lowest elevation: 75 m (246 ft)
- Population (2023): 535
  - Density: 35.4/km^{2} (91.8/sq mi)
- Demonym: Landais
- Time zone: UTC+01:00 (CET)
  - Summer (DST): UTC+02:00 (CEST)
- INSEE/Postal code: 50262 /50800
- ^{1} French Land Register data, which excludes lakes, ponds, glaciers > 1 km^{2} (0.386 sq mi or 247 acres) and river estuaries.

La Lande-d'Airou (French pronunciation: [la lɑ̃d dɛʁu]) is a commune in the Manche department in north-western France.

== See also ==
- Communes of the Manche department
