= Fleury, Manche =

Fleury
- Commune
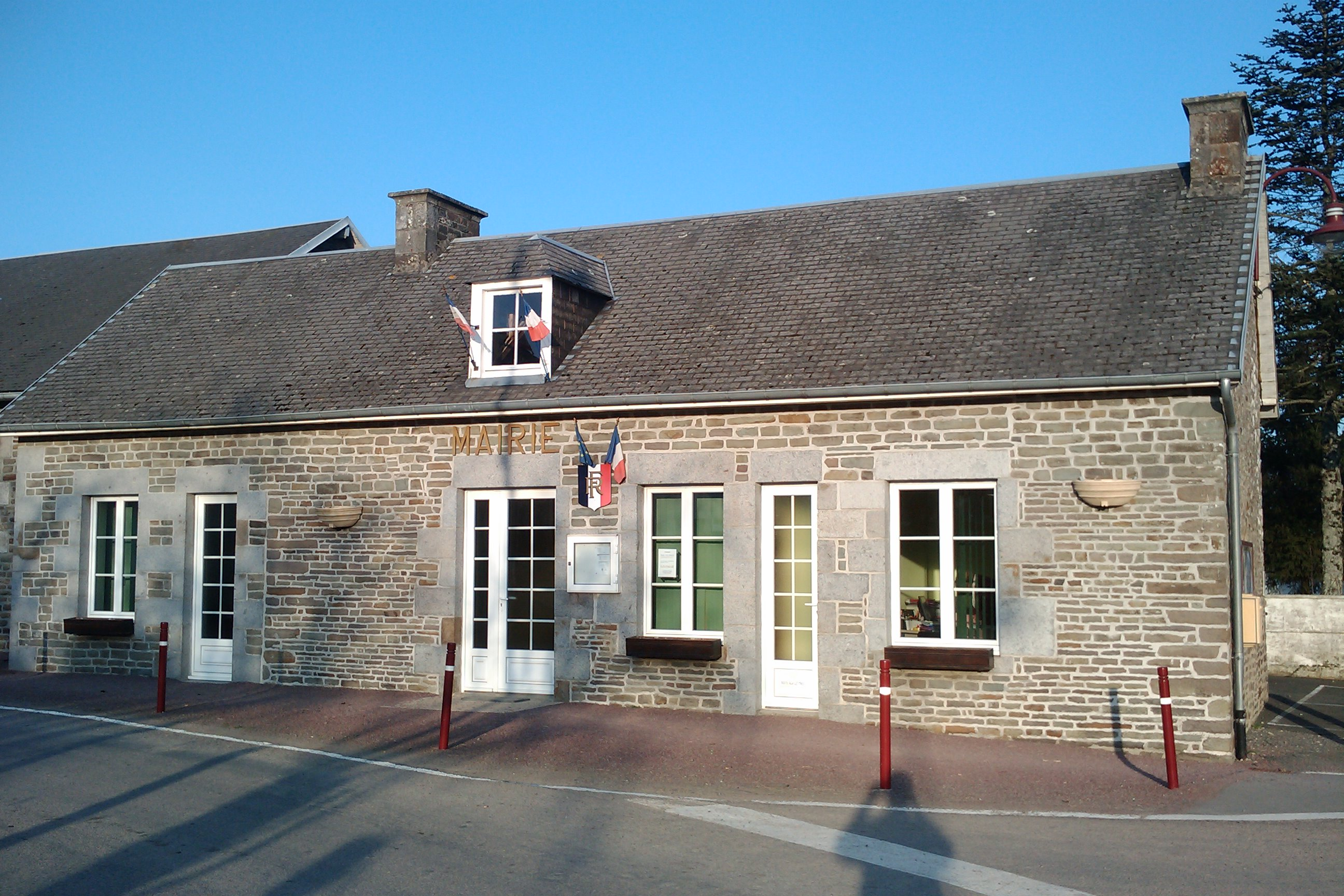
- Town hall
- Location of Fleury
- Location within France Location within Normandy
- Coordinates: 48°50′55″N 1°16′28″W
- Country: France
- Region: Normandy
- Department: Manche
- Arrondissement: Saint-Lô
- Canton: Villedieu-les-Poêles-Rouffigny
- Intercommunality: Villedieu Intercom

Government
  - Mayor (2020–2026): Daniel Vesval
- Area^{1}: 12.60 km^{2} (4.86 sq mi)
- Elevation: 150 m (490 ft)
- Highest elevation: 201 m (659 ft)
- Lowest elevation: 109 m (358 ft)
- Population (2023): 1,101
  - Density: 87.38/km^{2} (226.3/sq mi)
- Demonym: Fleurions
- Time zone: UTC+01:00 (CET)
  - Summer (DST): UTC+02:00 (CEST)
- INSEE/Postal code: 50185 /50800
- ^{1} French Land Register data, which excludes lakes, ponds, glaciers > 1 km^{2} (0.386 sq mi or 247 acres) and river estuaries.

Fleury (French pronunciation: [flœʁi]) is a commune in the Manche department in north-western France.

== Notable residents ==
Michael Vartan

== See also ==
- Communes of the Manche department
