= La Colombe, Manche =

La Colombe
- Commune
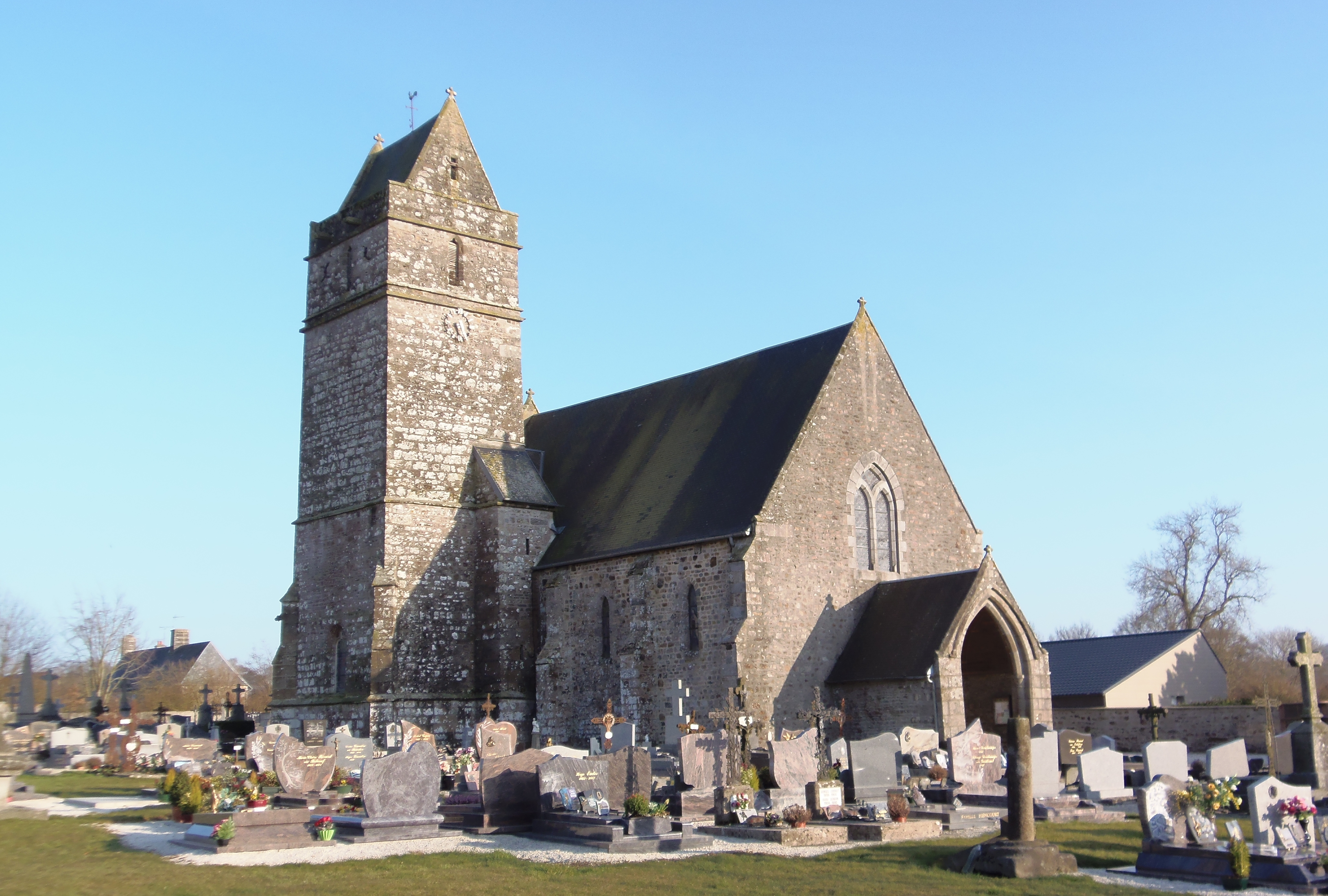
- The church of Notre-Dame
- Location of La Colombe
- Location within France Location within Normandy
- Coordinates: 48°52′32″N 1°10′53″W
- Country: France
- Region: Normandy
- Department: Manche
- Arrondissement: Saint-Lô
- Canton: Villedieu-les-Poêles-Rouffigny
- Intercommunality: Villedieu Intercom

Government
  - Mayor (2023–2026): Yvan Soulard
- Area^{1}: 14.37 km^{2} (5.55 sq mi)
- Elevation: 167 m (548 ft)
- Highest elevation: 247 m (810 ft)
- Lowest elevation: 88 m (289 ft)
- Population (2023): 626
  - Density: 43.6/km^{2} (113/sq mi)
- Demonym: Colombais
- Time zone: UTC+01:00 (CET)
  - Summer (DST): UTC+02:00 (CEST)
- INSEE/Postal code: 50137 /50800
- ^{1} French Land Register data, which excludes lakes, ponds, glaciers > 1 km^{2} (0.386 sq mi or 247 acres) and river estuaries.

La Colombe (French pronunciation: [la kɔlɔ̃b]) is a commune in the Manche department in Normandy in north-western France.

== See also ==
- Communes of the Manche department
