= Coulouvray-Boisbenâtre =

- Commune
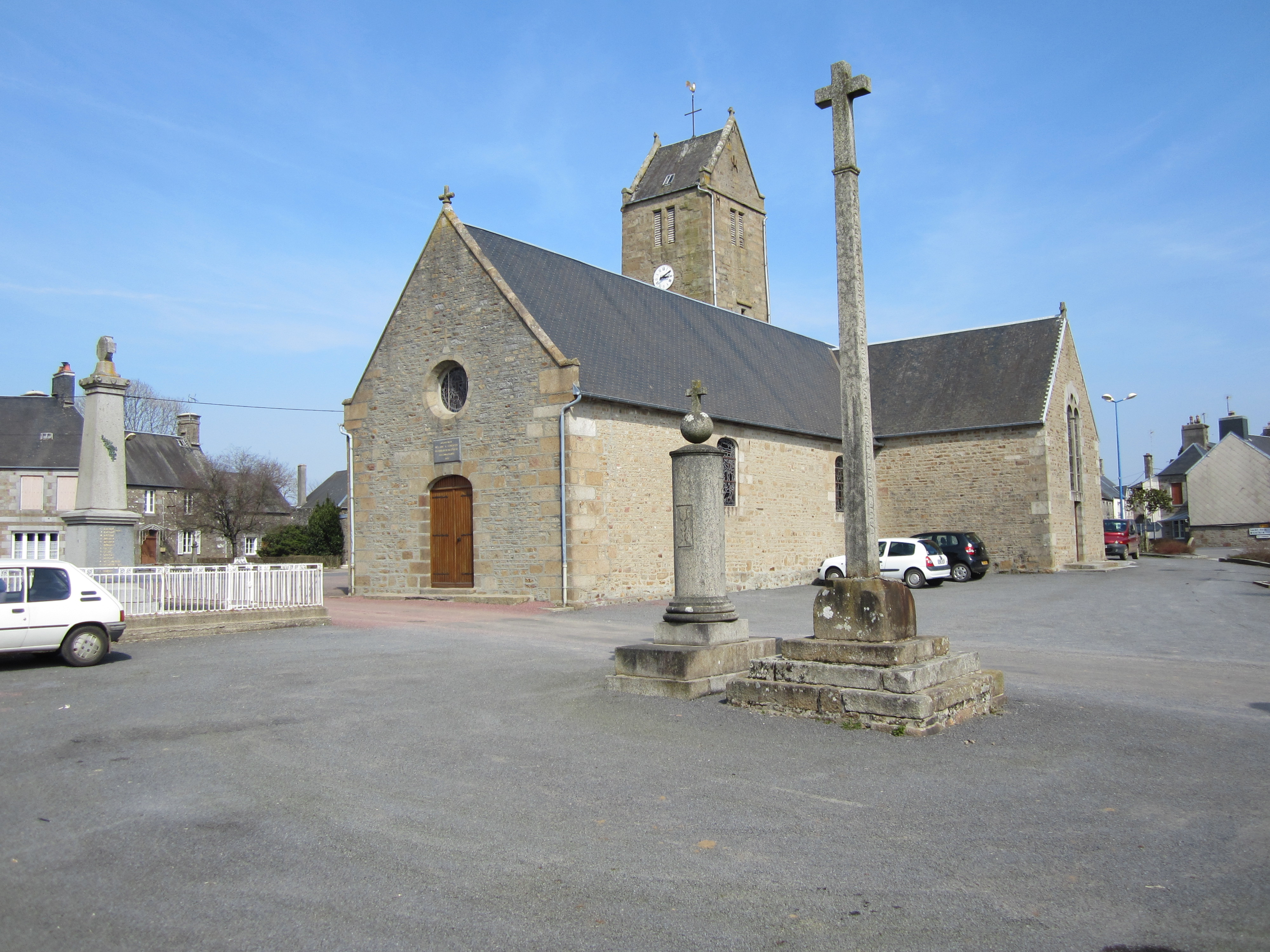
- The church of Notre-Dame
- Location of Coulouvray-Boisbenâtre
- Location within France Location within Normandy
- Coordinates: 48°47′15″N 1°06′28″W
- Country: France
- Region: Normandy
- Department: Manche
- Arrondissement: Avranches
- Canton: Villedieu-les-Poêles-Rouffigny
- Intercommunality: Villedieu Intercom

Government
  - Mayor (2020–2026): Daniel Tourgis
- Area^{1}: 17.25 km^{2} (6.66 sq mi)
- Elevation: 264 m (866 ft)
- Highest elevation: 315 m (1,033 ft)
- Lowest elevation: 130 m (430 ft)
- Population (2023): 531
  - Density: 30.8/km^{2} (79.7/sq mi)
- Time zone: UTC+01:00 (CET)
  - Summer (DST): UTC+02:00 (CEST)
- INSEE/Postal code: 50144 /50670
- ^{1} French Land Register data, which excludes lakes, ponds, glaciers > 1 km^{2} (0.386 sq mi or 247 acres) and river estuaries.

Coulouvray-Boisbenâtre (French pronunciation: [kuluvʁɛ bwabənatʁ]) is a commune in the Manche department in Normandy in north-western France.

== Geography ==
=== Climate ===
Coulouvray-Boisbenâtre has an oceanic climate (Köppen climate classification Cfb). The average annual temperature in Coulouvray-Boisbenâtre is 10.4 °C (50.7 °F). The average annual rainfall is 1,378.3 mm (54.26 in) with December as the wettest month. The temperatures are highest on average in August, at around 17.1 °C (62.8 °F), and lowest in January, at around 4.3 °C (39.7 °F). The highest temperature ever recorded in Coulouvray-Boisbenâtre was 36.5 °C (97.7 °F) on 5 August 2003; the coldest temperature ever recorded was −13.5 °C (7.7 °F) on 7 February 1991.

Climate data for Coulouvray-Boisbenâtre (1981–2010 averages, extremes 1988−present)
Month	Jan	Feb	Mar	Apr	May	Jun	Jul	Aug	Sep	Oct	Nov	Dec	Year
Record high °C (°F)	14.5 (58.1)	20.5 (68.9)	23.0 (73.4)	27.0 (80.6)	28.5 (83.3)	34.5 (94.1)	36.0 (96.8)	36.5 (97.7)	32.1 (89.8)	27.5 (81.5)	21.0 (69.8)	14.0 (57.2)	36.5 (97.7)
Mean daily maximum °C (°F)	6.6 (43.9)	7.9 (46.2)	10.6 (51.1)	12.9 (55.2)	16.9 (62.4)	19.7 (67.5)	21.4 (70.5)	21.7 (71.1)	18.8 (65.8)	14.7 (58.5)	10.0 (50.0)	6.8 (44.2)	14.0 (57.2)
Daily mean °C (°F)	4.3 (39.7)	4.9 (40.8)	7.1 (44.8)	8.8 (47.8)	12.5 (54.5)	15.0 (59.0)	16.9 (62.4)	17.1 (62.8)	14.6 (58.3)	11.4 (52.5)	7.2 (45.0)	4.4 (39.9)	10.4 (50.7)
Mean daily minimum °C (°F)	1.9 (35.4)	2.0 (35.6)	3.7 (38.7)	4.7 (40.5)	8.1 (46.6)	10.4 (50.7)	12.4 (54.3)	12.5 (54.5)	10.4 (50.7)	8.1 (46.6)	4.5 (40.1)	2.0 (35.6)	6.8 (44.2)
Record low °C (°F)	−13.5 (7.7)	−13.5 (7.7)	−8.0 (17.6)	−5.0 (23.0)	−1.0 (30.2)	2.5 (36.5)	5.5 (41.9)	4.5 (40.1)	3.0 (37.4)	−3.5 (25.7)	−9.0 (15.8)	−11.0 (12.2)	−13.5 (7.7)
Average precipitation mm (inches)	149.2 (5.87)	111.5 (4.39)	109.4 (4.31)	83.6 (3.29)	95.5 (3.76)	81.3 (3.20)	86.1 (3.39)	84.5 (3.33)	108.1 (4.26)	149.1 (5.87)	153.6 (6.05)	166.4 (6.55)	1,378.3 (54.26)
Average precipitation days (≥ 1.0 mm)	17.0	13.4	14.4	12.4	12.7	10.6	11.6	10.5	11.7	15.1	16.4	16.4	162.3
Source: Meteociel

== See also ==
- Communes of the Manche department
