= Beslon =

- Commune
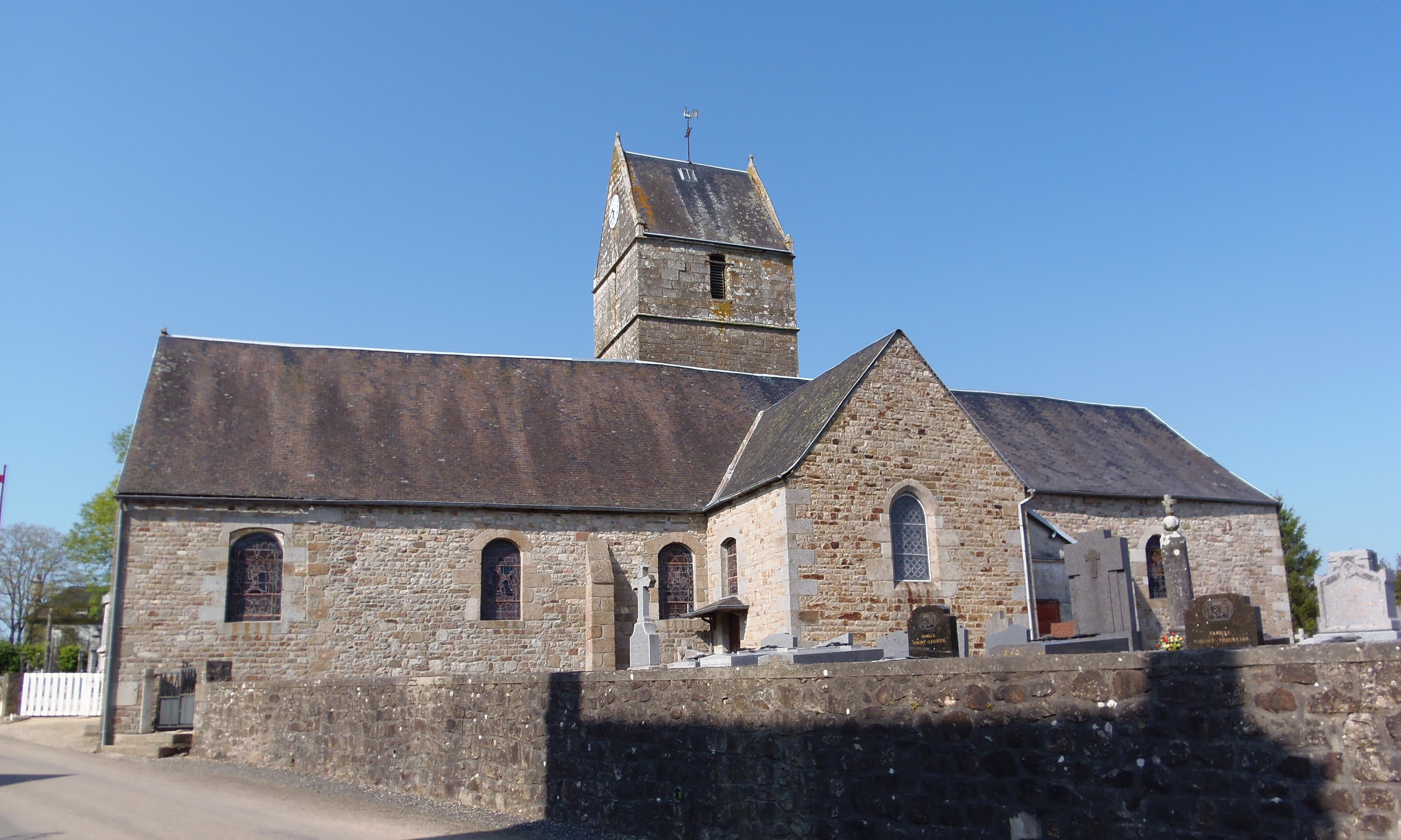
- The church of Notre-Dame
- Location of Beslon
- Location within France Location within Normandy
- Coordinates: 48°50′58″N 1°09′01″W
- Country: France
- Region: Normandy
- Department: Manche
- Arrondissement: Saint-Lô
- Canton: Villedieu-les-Poêles-Rouffigny

Government
  - Mayor (2020–2026): Léon Dolley
- Area^{1}: 17.24 km^{2} (6.66 sq mi)
- Elevation: 166 m (545 ft)
- Highest elevation: 237 m (778 ft)
- Lowest elevation: 118 m (387 ft)
- Population (2023): 562
  - Density: 32.6/km^{2} (84.4/sq mi)
- Time zone: UTC+01:00 (CET)
  - Summer (DST): UTC+02:00 (CEST)
- INSEE/Postal code: 50048 /50800
- ^{1} French Land Register data, which excludes lakes, ponds, glaciers > 1 km^{2} (0.386 sq mi or 247 acres) and river estuaries.

Beslon (French pronunciation: [bɛlɔ̃]) is a commune in the Manche department in the Normandy region in northwestern France.

== Population ==
Historical population
Year	Pop.	±% p.a.
1968	609	—
1975	560	−1.19%
1982	507	−1.41%
1990	500	−0.17%
1999	498	−0.04%
2007	514	+0.40%
2012	547	+1.25%
2017	560	+0.47%
2023	562	+0.06%
Source: INSEE

== See also ==
- Communes of the Manche department
