= Le Guislain =

- Commune
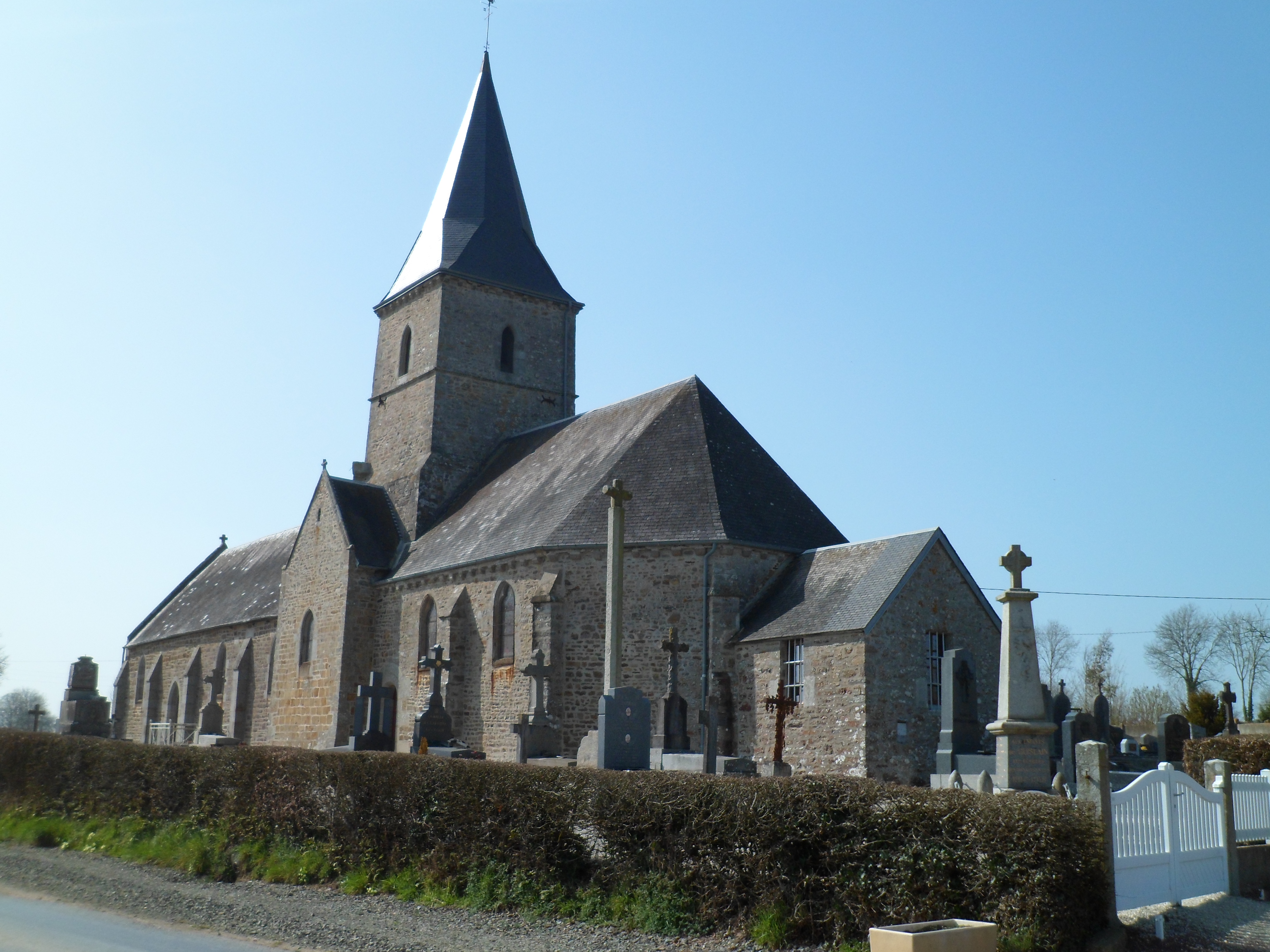
- The church of Saint-Pierre
- Location of Le Guislain
- Location within France Location within Normandy
- Coordinates: 48°58′22″N 1°13′38″W
- Country: France
- Region: Normandy
- Department: Manche
- Arrondissement: Saint-Lô
- Canton: Villedieu-les-Poêles-Rouffigny
- Intercommunality: Villedieu Intercom

Government
  - Mayor (2020–2026): Michel Lhullier
- Area^{1}: 5.39 km^{2} (2.08 sq mi)
- Highest elevation: 141 m (463 ft)
- Lowest elevation: 100 m (330 ft)
- Population (2023): 135
  - Density: 25.0/km^{2} (64.9/sq mi)
- Demonym: Guislenais
- Time zone: UTC+01:00 (CET)
  - Summer (DST): UTC+02:00 (CEST)
- INSEE/Postal code: 50225 /50410
- ^{1} French Land Register data, which excludes lakes, ponds, glaciers > 1 km^{2} (0.386 sq mi or 247 acres) and river estuaries.

Le Guislain (French pronunciation: [lə ɡilɛ̃]) is a commune in the Manche department in north-western France. As of 2023, the population of the commune was 135.

== See also ==
- Communes of the Manche department
