= Montbray =

- Commune
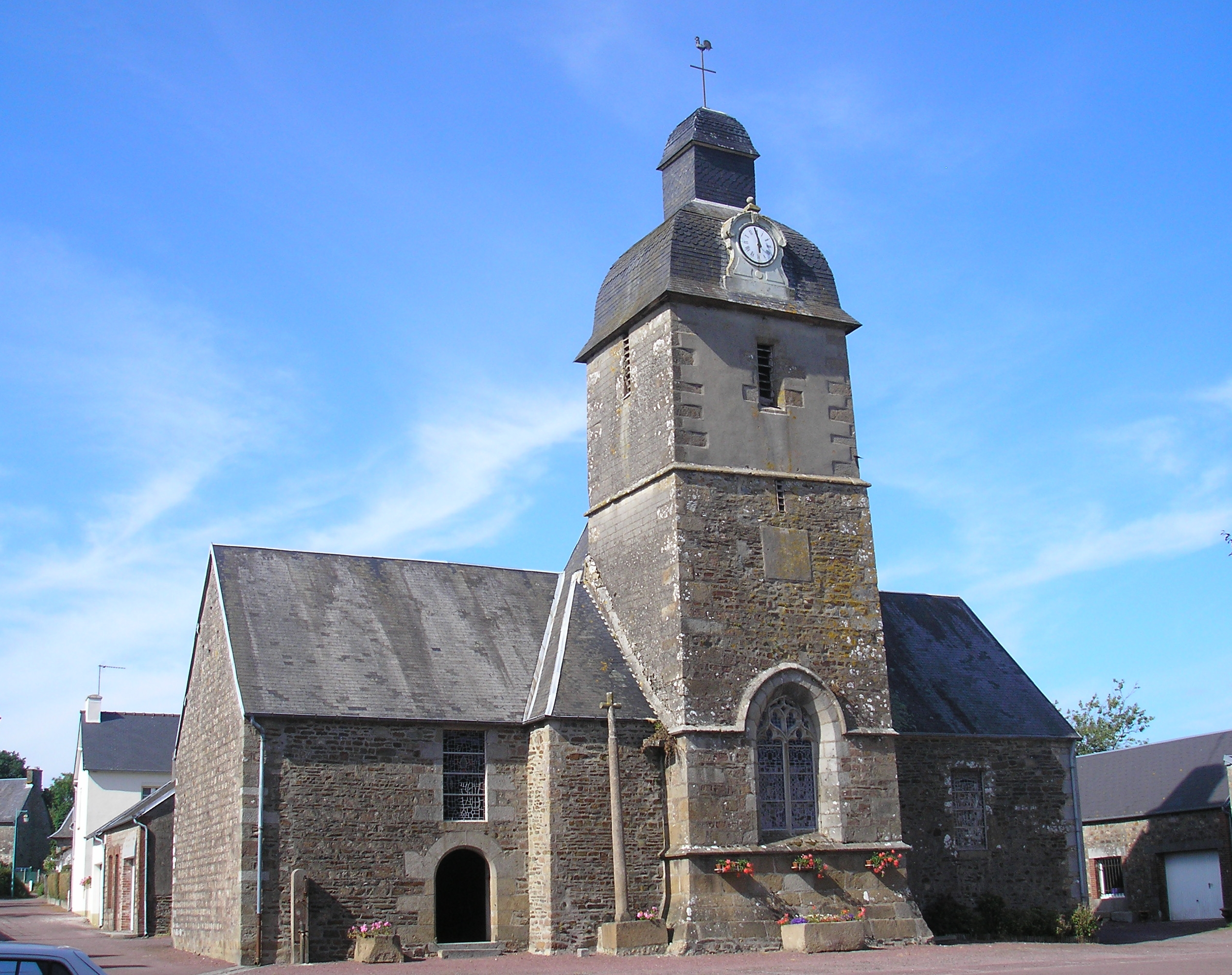
- The chapel of Saint-Pierre
- Location of Montbray
- Location within France Location within Normandy
- Coordinates: 48°52′52″N 1°05′40″W
- Country: France
- Region: Normandy
- Department: Manche
- Arrondissement: Saint-Lô
- Canton: Villedieu-les-Poêles-Rouffigny
- Intercommunality: Villedieu Intercom

Government
  - Mayor (2025–2026): Pierrick Cochard
- Area^{1}: 14.04 km^{2} (5.42 sq mi)
- Elevation: 90 m (300 ft)
- Highest elevation: 266 m (873 ft)
- Lowest elevation: 79 m (259 ft)
- Population (2023): 340
  - Density: 24/km^{2} (63/sq mi)
- Demonym: Montbrayons
- Time zone: UTC+01:00 (CET)
  - Summer (DST): UTC+02:00 (CEST)
- INSEE/Postal code: 50338 /50410
- ^{1} French Land Register data, which excludes lakes, ponds, glaciers > 1 km^{2} (0.386 sq mi or 247 acres) and river estuaries.

Montbray (French pronunciation: [mɔ̃bʁɛ]) is a commune in the Manche department in Normandy in north-western France.

The village has an ancient château which belongs to the commune and houses the town hall and the village nursery school. The village also has a church, a bar, a bakery, a garage and a children's play area with picnic tables and a pond.

== See also ==
- Communes of the Manche department
