= La Chapelle-Cécelin =

- Commune
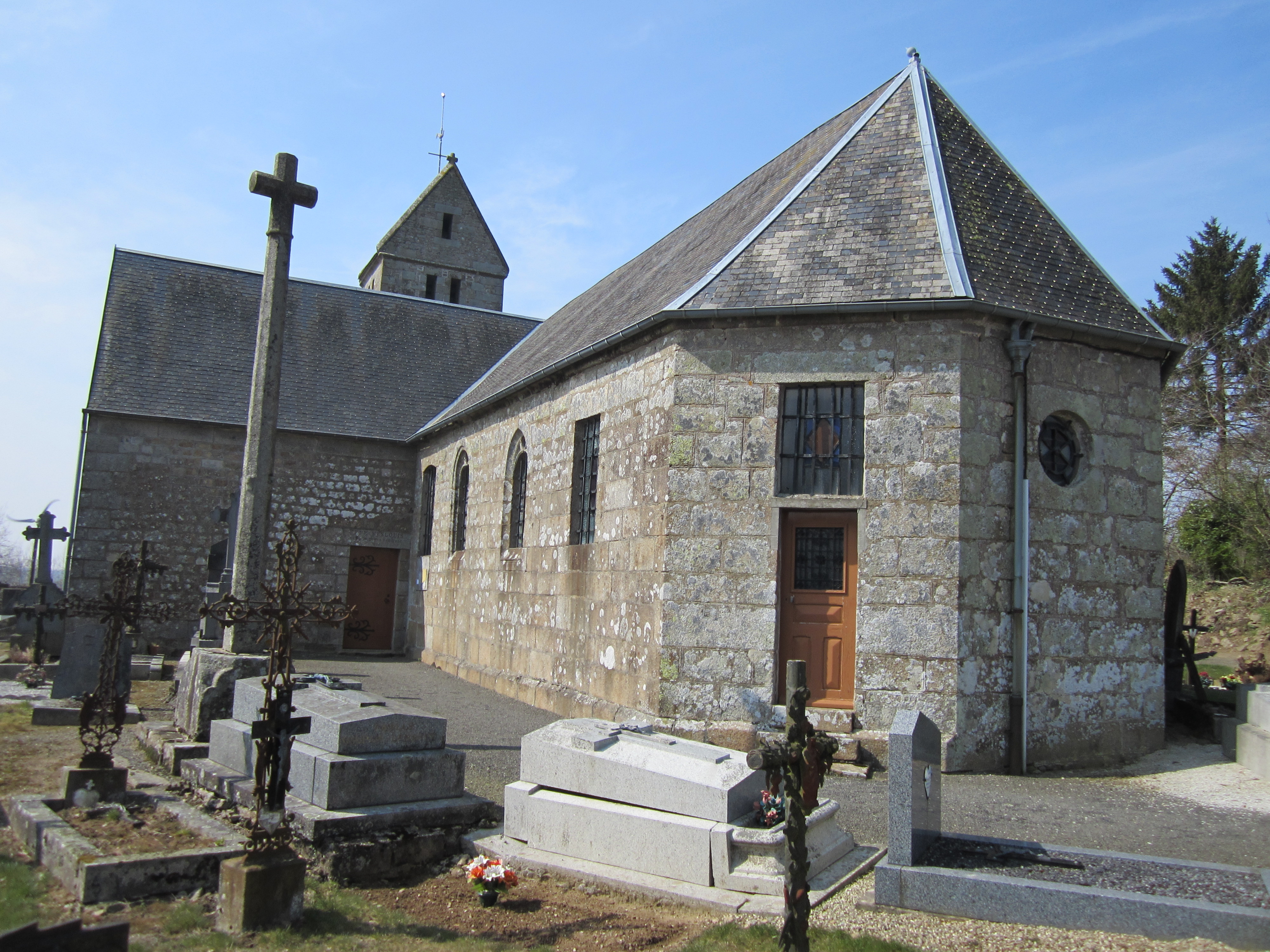
- The church of Saint-Cyr-et-Sainte-Julitte
- Location of La Chapelle-Cécelin
- Location within France Location within Normandy
- Coordinates: 48°48′42″N 1°09′33″W
- Country: France
- Region: Normandy
- Department: Manche
- Arrondissement: Avranches
- Canton: Villedieu-les-Poêles-Rouffigny
- Intercommunality: Villedieu Intercom

Government
  - Mayor (2020–2026): Françoise Mauduit
- Area^{1}: 5.22 km^{2} (2.02 sq mi)
- Elevation: 236 m (774 ft)
- Highest elevation: 242 m (794 ft)
- Lowest elevation: 160 m (520 ft)
- Population (2023): 245
  - Density: 46.9/km^{2} (122/sq mi)
- Time zone: UTC+01:00 (CET)
  - Summer (DST): UTC+02:00 (CEST)
- INSEE/Postal code: 50121 /50800
- ^{1} French Land Register data, which excludes lakes, ponds, glaciers > 1 km^{2} (0.386 sq mi or 247 acres) and river estuaries.

La Chapelle-Cécelin (French pronunciation: [la ʃapɛl seslɛ̃]) is a commune in the Manche department in Normandy in north-western France.

== See also ==
- Communes of the Manche department
