= Beuvrigny =

- Commune
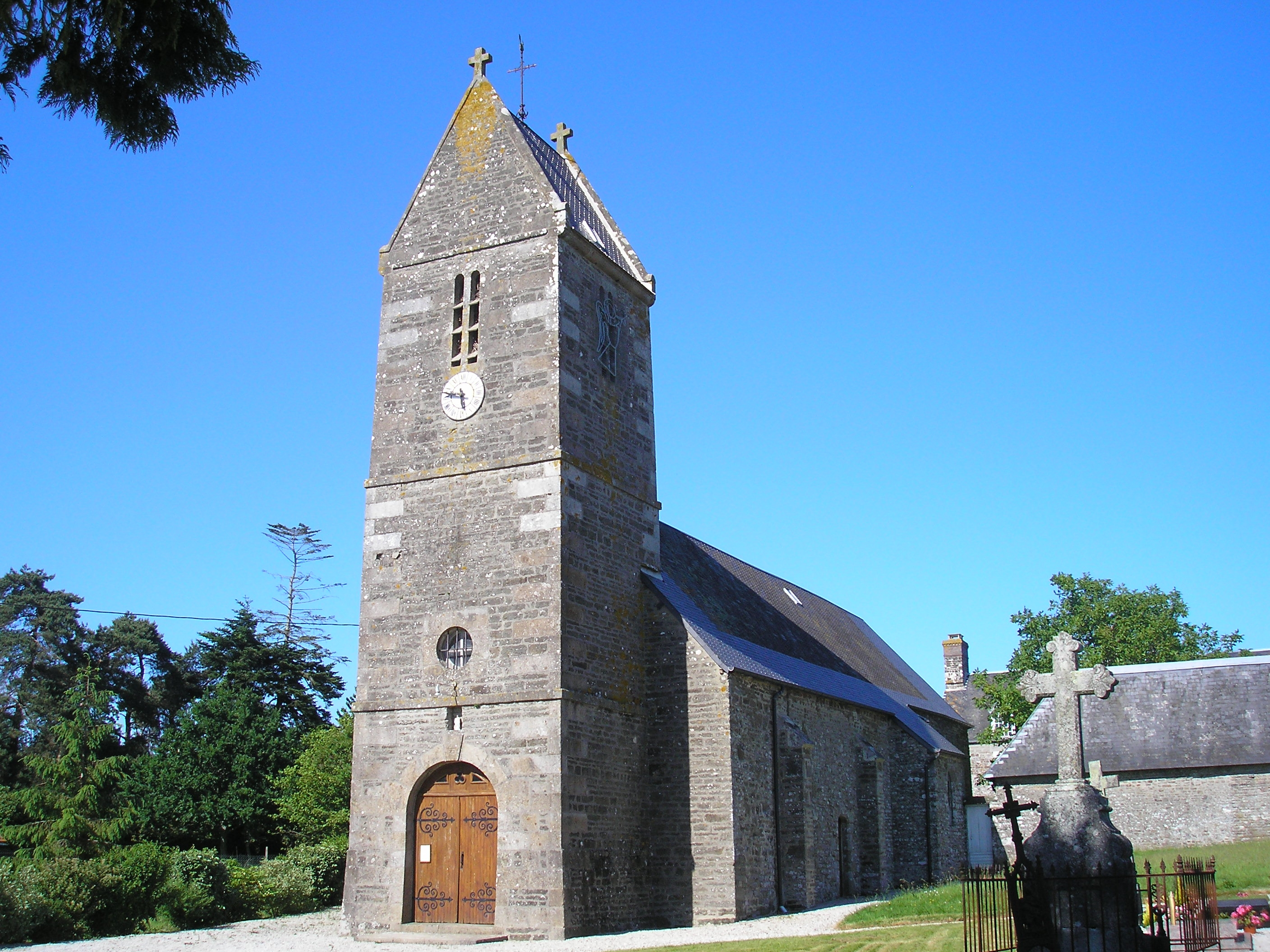
- The church of Saint-Martin
- Location of Beuvrigny
- Location within France Location within Normandy
- Coordinates: 48°58′05″N 1°00′11″W
- Country: France
- Region: Normandy
- Department: Manche
- Arrondissement: Saint-Lô
- Canton: Condé-sur-Vire
- Intercommunality: Saint-Lô Agglo

Government
  - Mayor (2020–2026): Morgane Buisson
- Area^{1}: 6.77 km^{2} (2.61 sq mi)
- Elevation: 150 m (490 ft)
- Highest elevation: 216 m (709 ft)
- Lowest elevation: 60 m (200 ft)
- Population (2023): 131
  - Density: 19.4/km^{2} (50.1/sq mi)
- Time zone: UTC+01:00 (CET)
  - Summer (DST): UTC+02:00 (CEST)
- INSEE/Postal code: 50050 /50420
- ^{1} French Land Register data, which excludes lakes, ponds, glaciers > 1 km^{2} (0.386 sq mi or 247 acres) and river estuaries.

Beuvrigny (French pronunciation: [bœvʁiɲi]) is a commune in the Manche department in the Normandy region in northwestern France.

== Population ==
Historical population
Year	Pop.	±% p.a.
1968	173	—
1975	155	−1.56%
1982	111	−4.66%
1990	93	−2.19%
1999	95	+0.24%
2007	153	+6.14%
2012	128	−3.51%
2017	138	+1.52%
2023	131	−0.86%
Source: INSEE

== See also ==
- Communes of the Manche department
