= Le Tanu =

- Commune
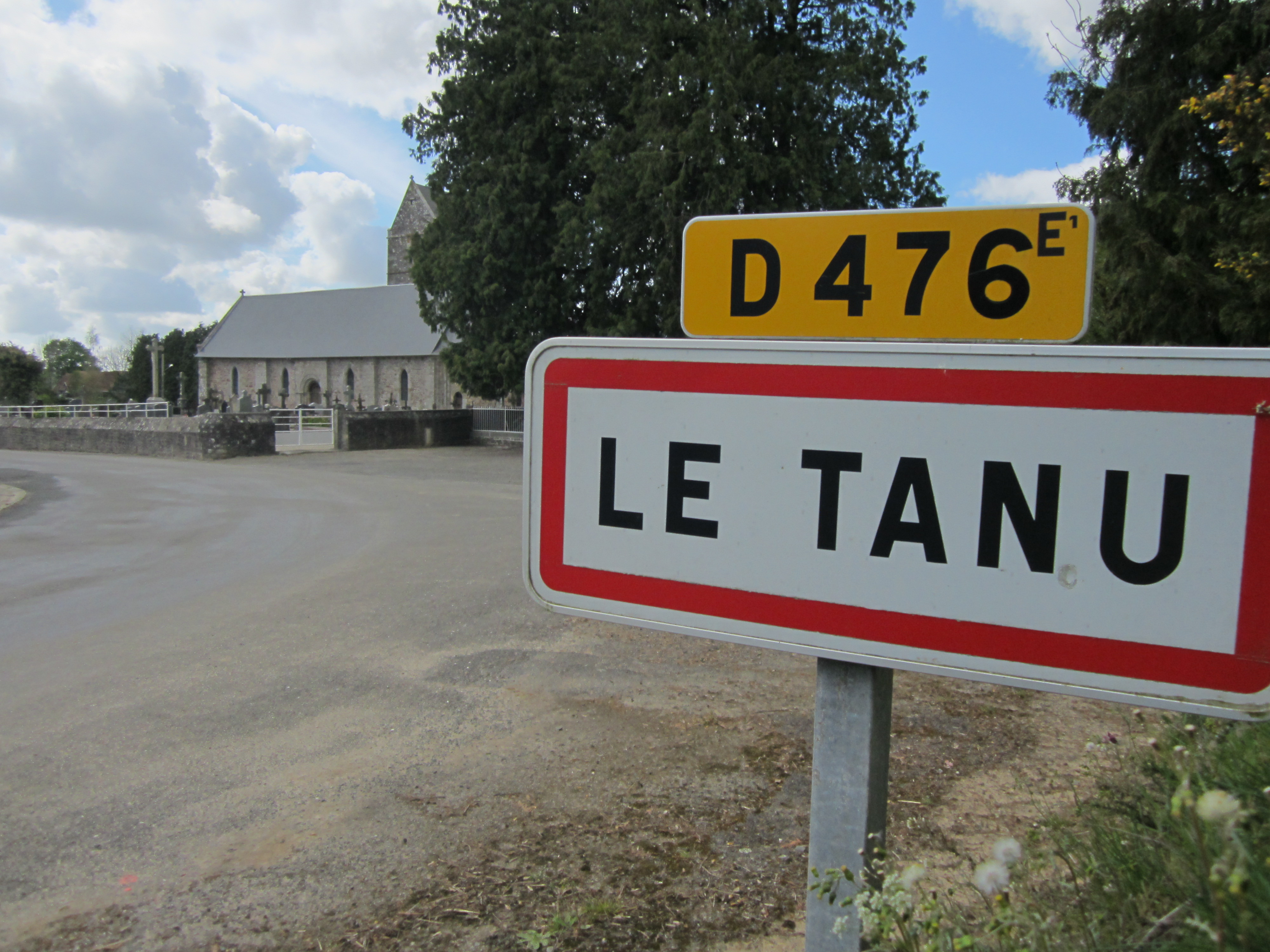
- Village entrance
- Location of Le Tanu
- Location within France Location within Normandy
- Coordinates: 48°49′02″N 1°20′38″W
- Country: France
- Region: Normandy
- Department: Manche
- Arrondissement: Avranches
- Canton: Villedieu-les-Poêles-Rouffigny
- Intercommunality: Villedieu Intercom

Government
  - Mayor (2020–2026): Nadine Gesnouin
- Area^{1}: 10.12 km^{2} (3.91 sq mi)
- Highest elevation: 166 m (545 ft)
- Lowest elevation: 68 m (223 ft)
- Population (2023): 430
  - Density: 42/km^{2} (110/sq mi)
- Demonym: Tanuais
- Time zone: UTC+01:00 (CET)
  - Summer (DST): UTC+02:00 (CEST)
- INSEE/Postal code: 50590 /50320
- ^{1} French Land Register data, which excludes lakes, ponds, glaciers > 1 km^{2} (0.386 sq mi or 247 acres) and river estuaries.

Le Tanu (French pronunciation: [lə tany]) is a commune in the Manche department in Normandy in north-western France. In January 1973 it absorbed the former commune Noirpalu.

== See also ==
- Communes of the Manche department
