= Communes of the Manche department =

List of communes of the Manche department of France

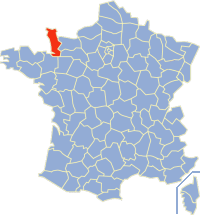

The following is a list of the 445 communes of the Manche department of France.

The communes cooperate in the following intercommunalities (as of 2025):

- Communauté d'agglomération du Cotentin
- Communauté d'agglomération Mont-Saint-Michel-Normandie
- Communauté d'agglomération Saint-Lô Agglo
- Communauté de communes de la Baie du Cotentin
- Communauté de communes Côte Ouest Centre Manche
- Communauté de communes Coutances Mer et Bocage
- Communauté de communes de Granville, Terre et Mer
- Communauté de communes de Villedieu Intercom

INSEE code	Postal code	Commune
50002	50180	Agneaux
50003	50230	Agon-Coutainville
50004	50680	Airel
50006	50620	Amigny
50008	50400	Anctoville-sur-Boscq
50013	50760	Anneville-en-Saire
50016	50500	Appeville
50019	50170	Aucey-la-Plaine
50021	50480	Audouville-la-Hubert
50022	50630	Aumeville-Lestre
50023	50500	Auvers
50024	50500	Auxais
50025	50300	Avranches
50026	50310	Azeville
50027	50530	Bacilly
50028	50450	La Baleine
50029	50720	Barenton
50030	50760	Barfleur
50031	50270	Barneville-Carteret
50032	50810	La Barre-de-Semilly
50033	50270	Baubigny
50034	50000	Baudre
50036	50500	Baupte
50038	50320	Beauchamps
50039	50420	Beaucoudray
50040	50150	Beauficel
50042	50170	Beauvoir
50044	50210	Belval
50045	50340	Benoîtville
50046	50810	Bérigny
50048	50800	Beslon
50049	50390	Besneville
50050	50420	Beuvrigny
50052	50360	Beuzeville-la-Bastille
50054	50160	Biéville
50055	50390	Biniville
50058	50560	Blainville-sur-Mer
50059	50480	Blosville
50060	50800	La Bloutière
50062	50800	Boisyvon
50064	50360	La Bonneville
50069	50800	Bourguenolles
50546	50750	Bourgvallées
50070	50480	Boutteville
50072	50200	Brainville
50074	50370	Brécey
50076	50290	Bréhal
50077	50110	Bretteville
50078	50430	Bretteville-sur-Ay
50079	50260	Breuville
50081	50290	Bréville-sur-Mer
50082	50260	Bricquebec-en-Cotentin
50083	50340	Bricquebosq
50084	50200	Bricqueville-la-Blouette
50085	50290	Bricqueville-sur-Mer
50086	50330	Brillevast
50087	50700	Brix
50088	50150	Brouains
50090	50640	Buais-les-Monts
50092	50200	Cambernon
50093	50570	Cametours
50094	50210	Camprond
50095	50750	Canisy
50096	50330	Canteloup
50097	50580	Canville-la-Rocque
50098	50570	Carantilly
50099	50500	Carentan-les-Marais
50101	50330	Carneville
50102	50740	Carolles
50105	50390	Catteville
50106	50620	Cavigny
50108	50220	Céaux
50109	50510	Cérences
50110	50680	Cerisy-la-Forêt
50111	50210	Cerisy-la-Salle
50112	50370	La Chaise-Baudouin
50117	50530	Champeaux
50118	50800	Champrepus
50120	50510	Chanteloup
50121	50800	La Chapelle-Cécelin
50124	50370	La Chapelle-Urée
50514	50150	Chaulieu
50126	50870	Chavoy
50129	50100	Cherbourg-en-Cotentin
50130	50800	Chérencé-le-Héron
50135	50330	Clitourps
50137	50800	La Colombe
50138	50700	Colomby
50139	50890	Condé-sur-Vire
50143	50290	Coudeville-sur-Mer
50144	50670	Coulouvray-Boisbenâtre
50145	50200	Courcy
50146	50220	Courtils
50147	50200	Coutances
50148	50680	Couvains
50149	50690	Couville
50150	50630	Crasville
50151	50710	Créances
50152	50370	Les Cresnays
50155	50220	Crollon
50156	50360	Crosville-sur-Douve
50158	50670	Cuves
50159	50750	Dangy
50161	50620	Le Dézert
50162	50110	Digosville
50164	50420	Domjean
50165	50350	Donville-les-Bains
50166	50250	Doville
50167	50530	Dragey-Ronthon
50168	50220	Ducey-Les Chéris
50169	50310	Écausseville
50172	50310	Émondeville
50174	50320	Équilly
50175	50310	Éroudeville
50176	50260	L'Étang-Bertrand
50177	50360	Étienville
50178	50840	Fermanville
50181	50190	Feugères
50182	50190	La Feuillie
50183	50580	Fierville-les-Mines
50184	50340	Flamanville
50185	50800	Fleury
50186	50700	Flottemanville
50188	50320	Folligny
50190	50310	Fontenay-sur-Mer
50192	50420	Fourneaux
50193	50850	Le Fresne-Poret
50194	50310	Fresville
50195	50150	Gathemo
50196	50760	Gatteville-le-Phare
50197	50450	Gavray-sur-Sienne
50198	50560	Geffosses
50199	50530	Genêts
50200	50850	Ger
50205	50300	La Godefroy
50207	50390	Golleville
50208	50190	Gonfreville
50209	50330	Gonneville-le-Theil
50210	50190	Gorges
50214	50420	Gouvets
50215	50560	Gouville-sur-Mer
50216	50620	Graignes-Mesnil-Angot
50217	50370	Le Grand-Celland
50391	50600	Grandparigny
50218	50400	Granville
50219	50200	Gratot
50221	50450	Grimesnil
50115	50320	Le Grippon
50222	50340	Grosville
50225	50410	Le Guislain
50041	50440	La Hague
50227	50310	Le Ham
50228	50450	Hambye
50229	50730	Hamelin
50230	50690	Hardinvast
50232	50570	Hauteville-la-Guichard
50231	50590	Hauteville-sur-Mer
50233	50390	Hautteville-Bocage
50236	50250	La Haye
50234	50410	La Haye-Bellefond
50235	50270	La Haye-d'Ectot
50237	50320	La Haye-Pesnel
50238	50340	Héauville
50240	50340	Helleville
50241	50700	Hémevez
50243	50200	Heugueville-sur-Sienne
50246	50480	Hiesville
50247	50320	Hocquigny
50251	50700	Huberville
50252	50510	Hudimesnil
50253	50170	Huisnes-sur-Mer
50256	50540	Isigny-le-Buat
50258	50310	Joganville
50259	50220	Juilley
50066	50610	Jullouville
50260	50520	Juvigny les Vallées
50261	50160	Lamberville
50262	50800	La Lande-d'Airou
50263	50600	Lapenty
50265	50430	Laulne
50266	50510	Lengronne
50267	50430	Lessay
50268	50310	Lestre
50269	50480	Liesville-sur-Douve
50270	50700	Lieusaint
50271	50670	Lingeard
50274	50600	Les Loges-Marchis
50275	50370	Les Loges-sur-Brécey
50276	50530	Lolif
50277	50290	Longueville
50278	50510	Le Loreur
50279	50570	Le Lorey
50281	50320	La Lucerne-d'Outremer
50282	50870	Le Luot
50283	50680	La Luzerne
50285	50260	Magneville
50288	50300	Marcey-les-Grèves
50289	50190	Marchésieux
50290	50220	Marcilly
50291	50410	Margueray
50292	50570	Marigny-le-Lozon
50294	50690	Martinvast
50295	50410	Maupertuis
50296	50330	Maupertus-sur-Mer
50297	50880	La Meauffe
50298	50500	Méautis
50299	50580	Le Mesnil
50300	50520	Le Mesnil-Adelée
50302	50570	Le Mesnil-Amey
50304	50510	Le Mesnil-Aubert
50305	50110	Le Mesnil-au-Val
50310	50570	Le Mesnil-Eury
50311	50450	Le Mesnil-Garnier
50312	50670	Le Mesnil-Gilbert
50315	50600	Le Mesnillard
50317	50220	Le Mesnil-Ozenne
50321	50000	Le Mesnil-Rouxelin
50324	50620	Le Mesnil-Véneron

INSEE code	Postal code	Commune
50326	50450	Le Mesnil-Villeman
50327	50510	La Meurdraquière
50328	50190	Millières
50332	50270	Les Moitiers-d'Allonne
50334	50410	Montabot
50335	50700	Montaigu-la-Brisette
50336	50450	Montaigu-les-Bois
50338	50410	Montbray
50340	50490	Montcuit
50341	50310	Montebourg
50342	50760	Montfarville
50345	50200	Monthuchon
50347	50240	Montjoie-Saint-Martin
50349	50590	Montmartin-sur-Mer
50350	50210	Montpinchon
50351	50810	Montrabot
50352	50570	Montreuil-sur-Lozon
50353	50170	Le Mont-Saint-Michel
50273	50250	Montsenelle
50356	50680	Moon-sur-Elle
50357	50410	Morigny
50359	50140	Mortain-Bocage
50360	50700	Morville
50361	50320	La Mouche
50362	50600	Moulines
50363	50860	Moyon-Villages
50364	50490	Muneville-le-Bingard
50365	50290	Muneville-sur-Mer
50368	50190	Nay
50369	50260	Négreville
50370	50390	Néhou
50371	50140	Le Neufbourg
50372	50250	Neufmesnil
50373	50480	Neuville-au-Plain
50374	50250	Neuville-en-Beaumont
50376	50200	Nicorps
50378	50210	Notre-Dame-de-Cenilly
50379	50370	Notre-Dame-de-Livoye
50382	50690	Nouainville
50384	50630	Octeville-l'Avenel
50387	50390	Orglandes
50388	50660	Orval-sur-Sienne
50389	50210	Ouville
50390	50310	Ozeville
50535	50870	Le Parc
50393	50410	Percy-en-Normandie
50394	50190	Périers
50395	50630	La Pernelle
50397	50150	Perriers-en-Beauficel
50398	50160	Le Perron
50399	50370	Le Petit-Celland
50400	50360	Picauville
50401	50340	Pierreville
50402	50340	Les Pieux
50403	50770	Pirou
50405	50250	Le Plessis-Lastelle
50407	50220	Poilley
50408	50220	Pontaubault
50409	50880	Pont-Hébert
50410	50170	Pontorson
50411	50300	Ponts
50412	50580	Port-Bail-sur-Mer
50413	50220	Précey
50417	50630	Quettehou
50419	50660	Quettreville-sur-Sienne
50420	50750	Quibou
50421	50310	Quinéville
50422	50500	Raids
50423	50000	Rampan
50425	50260	Rauville-la-Bigot
50426	50390	Rauville-la-Place
50428	50520	Reffuveille
50429	50590	Regnéville-sur-Mer
50430	50390	Reigneville-Bocage
50431	50570	Remilly-les-Marais
50433	50760	Réville
50435	50260	Rocheville
50436	50140	Romagny-Fontenay
50437	50210	Roncey
50442	50340	Le Rozel
50443	50170	Sacey
50444	50160	Saint-Amand-Villages
50445	50500	Saint-André-de-Bohon
50446	50680	Saint-André-de-l'Épine
50447	50380	Saint-Aubin-des-Préaux
50448	50240	Saint-Aubin-de-Terregatte
50450	50140	Saint-Barthélemy
50451	50300	Saint-Brice
50452	50730	Saint-Brice-de-Landelles
50454	50340	Saint-Christophe-du-Foc
50455	50680	Saint-Clair-sur-l'Elle
50456	50140	Saint-Clément-Rancoudray
50461	50310	Saint-Cyr-Bocage
50462	50720	Saint-Cyr-du-Bailleul
50463	50450	Saint-Denis-le-Gast
50464	50210	Saint-Denis-le-Vêtu
50453	50800	Sainte-Cécile
50457	50390	Sainte-Colombe
50469	50760	Sainte-Geneviève
50509	50480	Sainte-Marie-du-Mont
50523	50480	Sainte-Mère-Église
50556	50750	Sainte-Suzanne-sur-Vire
50467	50310	Saint-Floxel
50468	50620	Saint-Fromond
50471	50270	Saint-Georges-de-la-Rivière
50472	50370	Saint-Georges-de-Livoye
50473	50680	Saint-Georges-d'Elle
50474	50720	Saint-Georges-de-Rouelley
50475	50000	Saint-Georges-Montcocq
50476	50810	Saint-Germain-d'Elle
50478	50700	Saint-Germain-de-Tournebut
50479	50480	Saint-Germain-de-Varreville
50480	50340	Saint-Germain-le-Gaillard
50481	50430	Saint-Germain-sur-Ay
50482	50190	Saint-Germain-sur-Sèves
50483	50180	Saint-Gilles
50484	50600	Saint-Hilaire-du-Harcouët
50486	50390	Saint-Jacques-de-Néhou
50487	50240	Saint-James
50488	50620	Saint-Jean-de-Daye
50489	50300	Saint-Jean-de-la-Haize
50490	50270	Saint-Jean-de-la-Rivière
50492	50810	Saint-Jean-d'Elle
50491	50680	Saint-Jean-de-Savigny
50493	50320	Saint-Jean-des-Champs
50495	50370	Saint-Jean-du-Corail-des-Bois
50496	50530	Saint-Jean-le-Thomas
50498	50700	Saint-Joseph
50499	50670	Saint-Laurent-de-Cuves
50500	50240	Saint-Laurent-de-Terregatte
50502	50000	Saint-Lô
50504	50420	Saint-Louet-sur-Vire
50505	50300	Saint-Loup
50506	50200	Saint-Malo-de-la-Lande
50507	50310	Saint-Marcouf
50510	50190	Saint-Martin-d'Aubigny
50511	50310	Saint-Martin-d'Audouville
50512	50750	Saint-Martin-de-Bonfossé
50513	50210	Saint-Martin-de-Cenilly
50517	50480	Saint-Martin-de-Varreville
50518	50800	Saint-Martin-le-Bouillant
50519	50690	Saint-Martin-le-Gréard
50521	50800	Saint-Maur-des-Bois
50522	50270	Saint-Maurice-en-Cotentin
50525	50670	Saint-Michel-de-Montjoie
50528	50250	Saint-Nicolas-de-Pierrepont
50529	50370	Saint-Nicolas-des-Bois
50531	50300	Saint-Ovin
50532	50380	Saint-Pair-sur-Mer
50533	50190	Saint-Patrice-de-Claids
50536	50270	Saint-Pierre-d'Arthéglise
50537	50200	Saint-Pierre-de-Coutances
50538	50810	Saint-Pierre-de-Semilly
50539	50330	Saint-Pierre-Église
50540	50530	Saint-Pierre-Langers
50541	50400	Saint-Planchers
50542	50670	Saint-Pois
50543	50220	Saint-Quentin-sur-le-Homme
50548	50250	Saint-Sauveur-de-Pierrepont
50549	50510	Saint-Sauveur-la-Pommeraye
50551	50390	Saint-Sauveur-le-Vicomte
50550	50490	Saint-Sauveur-Villages
50552	50190	Saint-Sébastien-de-Raids
50553	50240	Saint-Senier-de-Beuvron
50554	50300	Saint-Senier-sous-Avranches
50562	50550	Saint-Vaast-la-Hougue
50563	50420	Saint-Vigor-des-Monts
50565	50530	Sartilly-Baie-Bocage
50567	50700	Saussemesnil
50568	50200	Saussey
50569	50210	Savigny
50570	50640	Savigny-le-Vieux
50571	50480	Sébeville
50572	50270	Sénoville
50574	50170	Servon
50575	50690	Sideville
50576	50340	Siouville-Hague
50578	50310	Sortosville
50577	50270	Sortosville-en-Beaumont
50579	50260	Sottevast
50580	50340	Sotteville
50582	50150	Sourdeval
50584	50870	Subligny
50585	50270	Surtainville
50587	50390	Taillepied
50588	50700	Tamerville
50589	50170	Tanis
50590	50320	Le Tanu
50591	50640	Le Teilleul
50564	50500	Terre-et-Marais
50592	50420	Tessy-Bocage
50593	50630	Teurthéville-Bocage
50594	50690	Teurthéville-Hague
50239	50180	Thèreval
50596	50330	Théville
50597	50870	Tirepied-sur-Sée
50598	50330	Tocqueville
50599	50470	Tollevast
50601	50160	Torigny-les-Villes
50272	50660	Tourneville-sur-Mer
50603	50200	Tourville-sur-Sienne
50604	50340	Tréauville
50606	50620	Tribehou
50607	50800	La Trinité
50609	50480	Turqueville
50610	50700	Urville
50612	50300	Vains
50613	50760	Valcanville
50615	50700	Valognes
50616	50300	Le Val-Saint-Père
50617	50250	Varenguebec
50618	50330	Varouville
50619	50630	Le Vast
50621	50310	Vaudreville
50624	50200	La Vendelée
50626	50450	Ver
50628	50370	Vernix
50629	50430	Vesly
50633	50760	Le Vicel
50142	50330	Vicq-sur-Mer
50634	50630	Videcosville
50637	50410	Villebaudon
50639	50800	Villedieu-les-Poêles-Rouffigny
50641	50680	Villiers-Fossard
50643	50690	Virandeville
50647	50400	Yquelon
50648	50700	Yvetot-Bocage
