= Saint-Martin-le-Bouillant =

- Commune
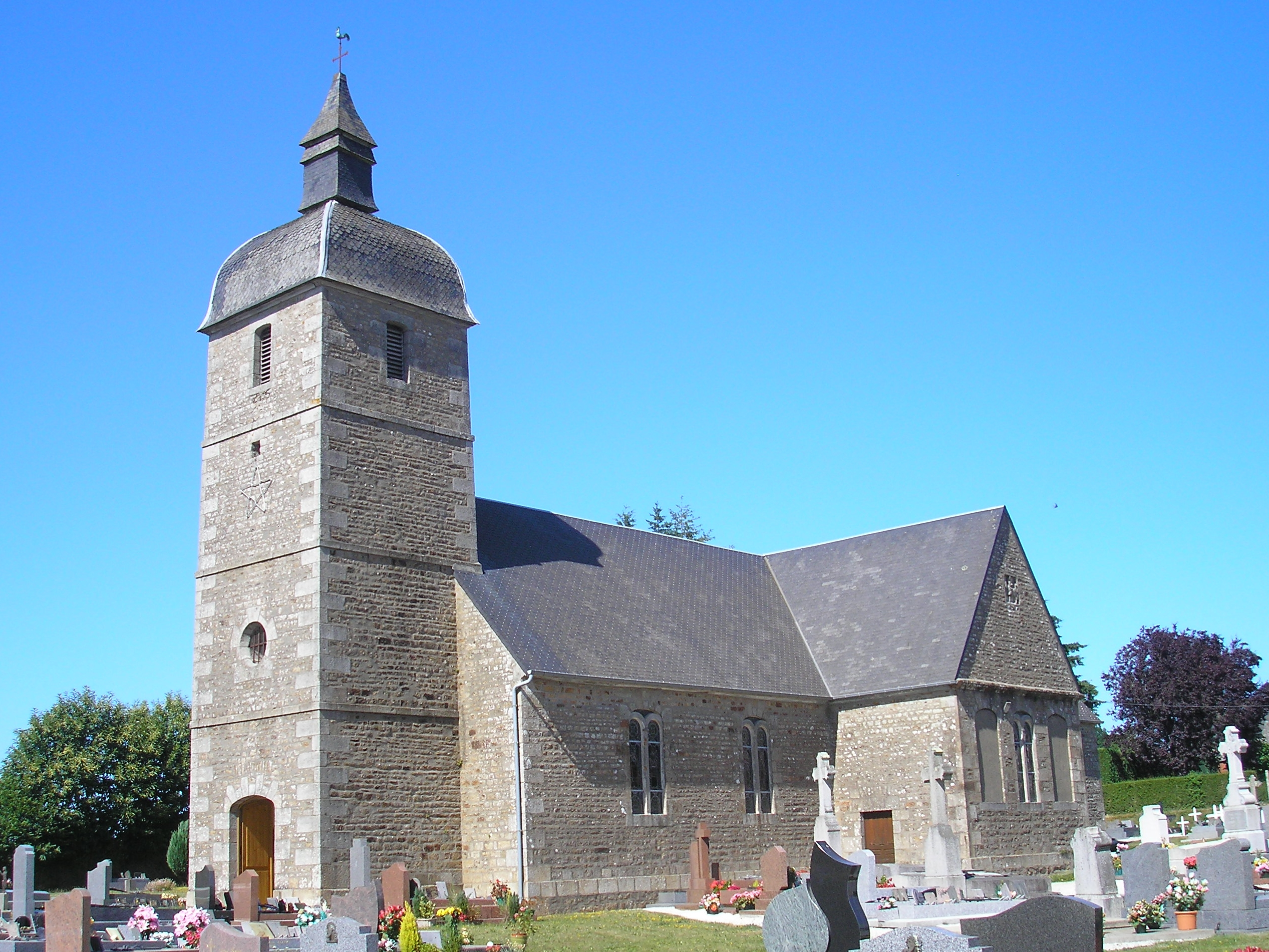
- The church of Saint-Martin
- Location of Saint-Martin-le-Bouillant
- Location within France Location within Normandy
- Coordinates: 48°47′09″N 1°10′33″W
- Country: France
- Region: Normandy
- Department: Manche
- Arrondissement: Avranches
- Canton: Villedieu-les-Poêles-Rouffigny

Government
  - Mayor (2020–2026): Bernard Lemasle
- Area^{1}: 12.37 km^{2} (4.78 sq mi)
- Elevation: 180 m (590 ft)
- Highest elevation: 252 m (827 ft)
- Lowest elevation: 90 m (300 ft)
- Population (2023): 301
  - Density: 24.3/km^{2} (63.0/sq mi)
- Time zone: UTC+01:00 (CET)
  - Summer (DST): UTC+02:00 (CEST)
- INSEE/Postal code: 50518 /50800
- ^{1} French Land Register data, which excludes lakes, ponds, glaciers > 1 km^{2} (0.386 sq mi or 247 acres) and river estuaries.

Saint-Martin-le-Bouillant (French pronunciation: [sɛ̃ maʁtɛ̃ lə bujɑ̃]) is a commune in the Manche department in Normandy in north-western France.

== See also ==
- Communes of the Manche department
