= Margueray =

- Commune
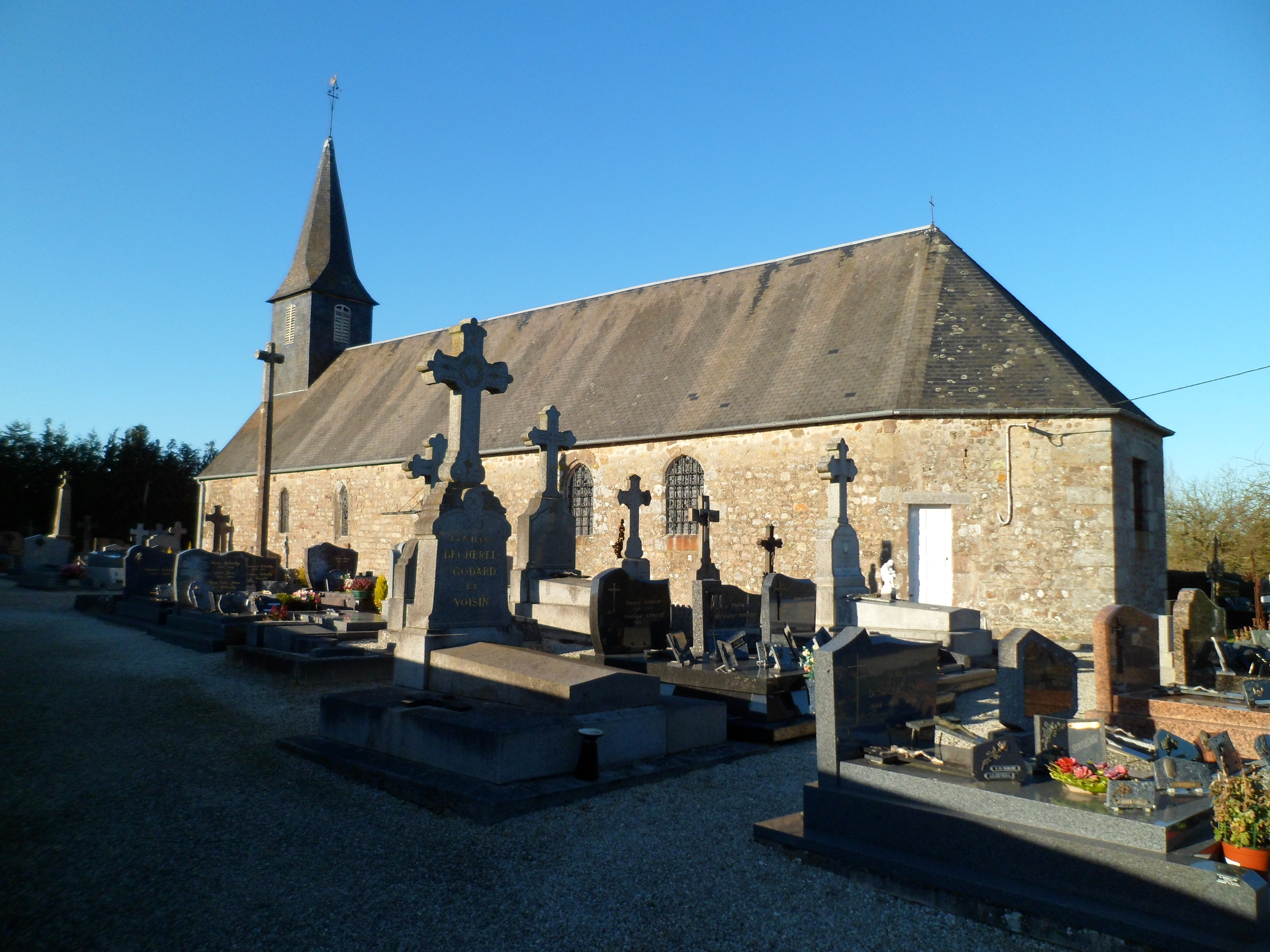
- The church of Notre-Dame-et-Saint-Gorgon
- Location of Margueray
- Location within France Location within Normandy
- Coordinates: 48°53′49″N 1°08′29″W
- Country: France
- Region: Normandy
- Department: Manche
- Arrondissement: Saint-Lô
- Canton: Villedieu-les-Poêles-Rouffigny
- Intercommunality: Villedieu Intercom

Government
  - Mayor (2020–2026): Pierre Manson
- Area^{1}: 4.64 km^{2} (1.79 sq mi)
- Elevation: 180 m (590 ft)
- Highest elevation: 257 m (843 ft)
- Lowest elevation: 169 m (554 ft)
- Population (2023): 119
  - Density: 25.6/km^{2} (66.4/sq mi)
- Demonym: Margueriais
- Time zone: UTC+01:00 (CET)
  - Summer (DST): UTC+02:00 (CEST)
- INSEE/Postal code: 50291 /50410
- ^{1} French Land Register data, which excludes lakes, ponds, glaciers > 1 km^{2} (0.386 sq mi or 247 acres) and river estuaries.

Margueray (French pronunciation: [maʁɡəʁɛ]) is a commune in the Manche department in Normandy in north-western France.

== See also ==
- Communes of the Manche department
