= La Haye-Bellefond =

- Commune
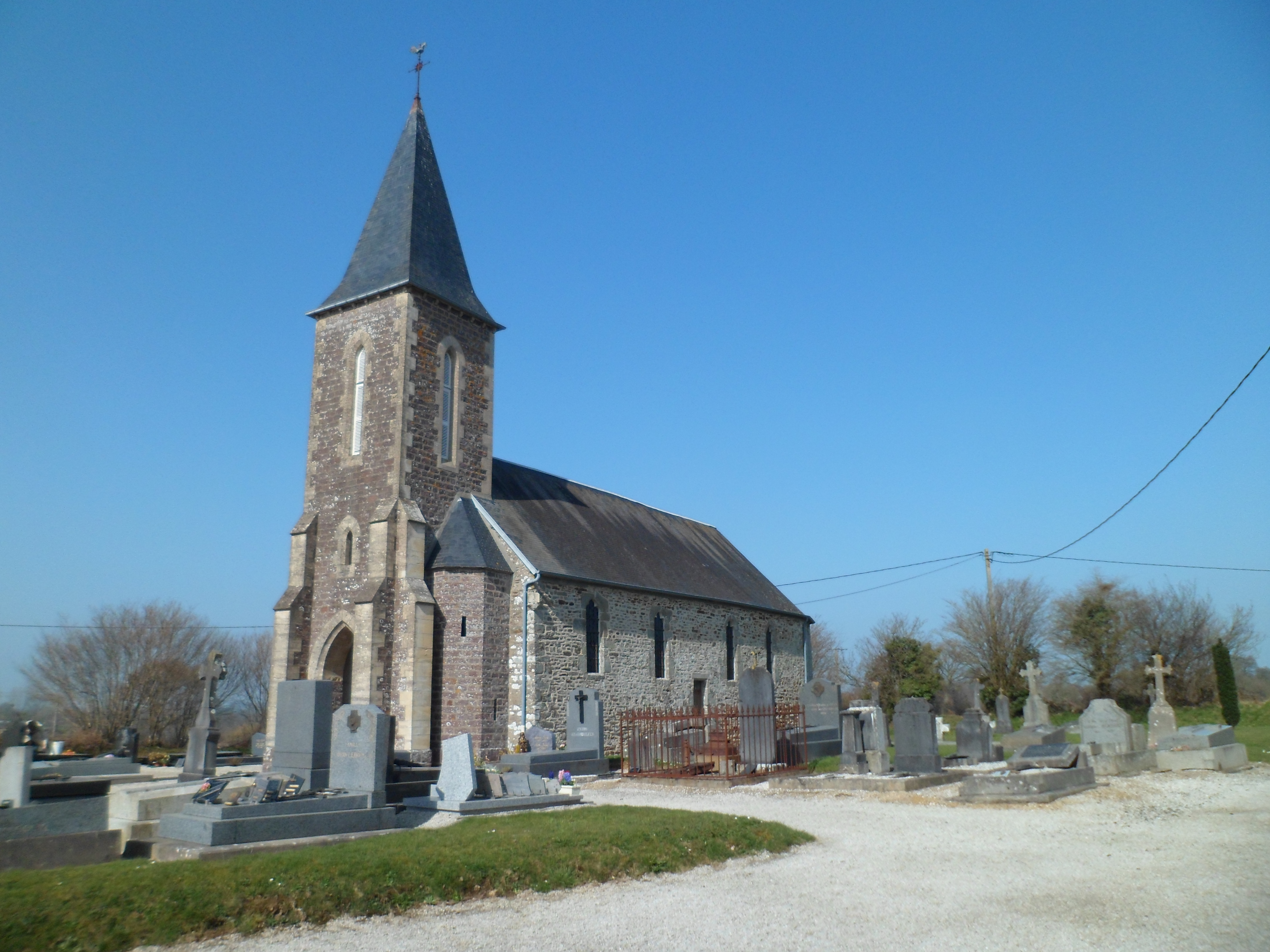
- The church of Saint-Nicolas
- Location of La Haye-Bellefond
- Location within France Location within Normandy
- Coordinates: 48°59′03″N 1°10′59″W
- Country: France
- Region: Normandy
- Department: Manche
- Arrondissement: Saint-Lô
- Canton: Villedieu-les-Poêles-Rouffigny
- Intercommunality: Villedieu Intercom

Government
  - Mayor (2020–2026): Pascal Renouf
- Area^{1}: 2.82 km^{2} (1.09 sq mi)
- Highest elevation: 137 m (449 ft)
- Lowest elevation: 92 m (302 ft)
- Population (2023): 63
  - Density: 22/km^{2} (58/sq mi)
- Time zone: UTC+01:00 (CET)
  - Summer (DST): UTC+02:00 (CEST)
- INSEE/Postal code: 50234 /50410
- ^{1} French Land Register data, which excludes lakes, ponds, glaciers > 1 km^{2} (0.386 sq mi or 247 acres) and river estuaries.

La Haye-Bellefond (French pronunciation: [la ɛ bɛlfɔ̃]) is a commune in the Manche department in Normandy in north-western France.

== See also ==
- Communes of the Manche department
