= Le Mesnil-Eury =

- Commune
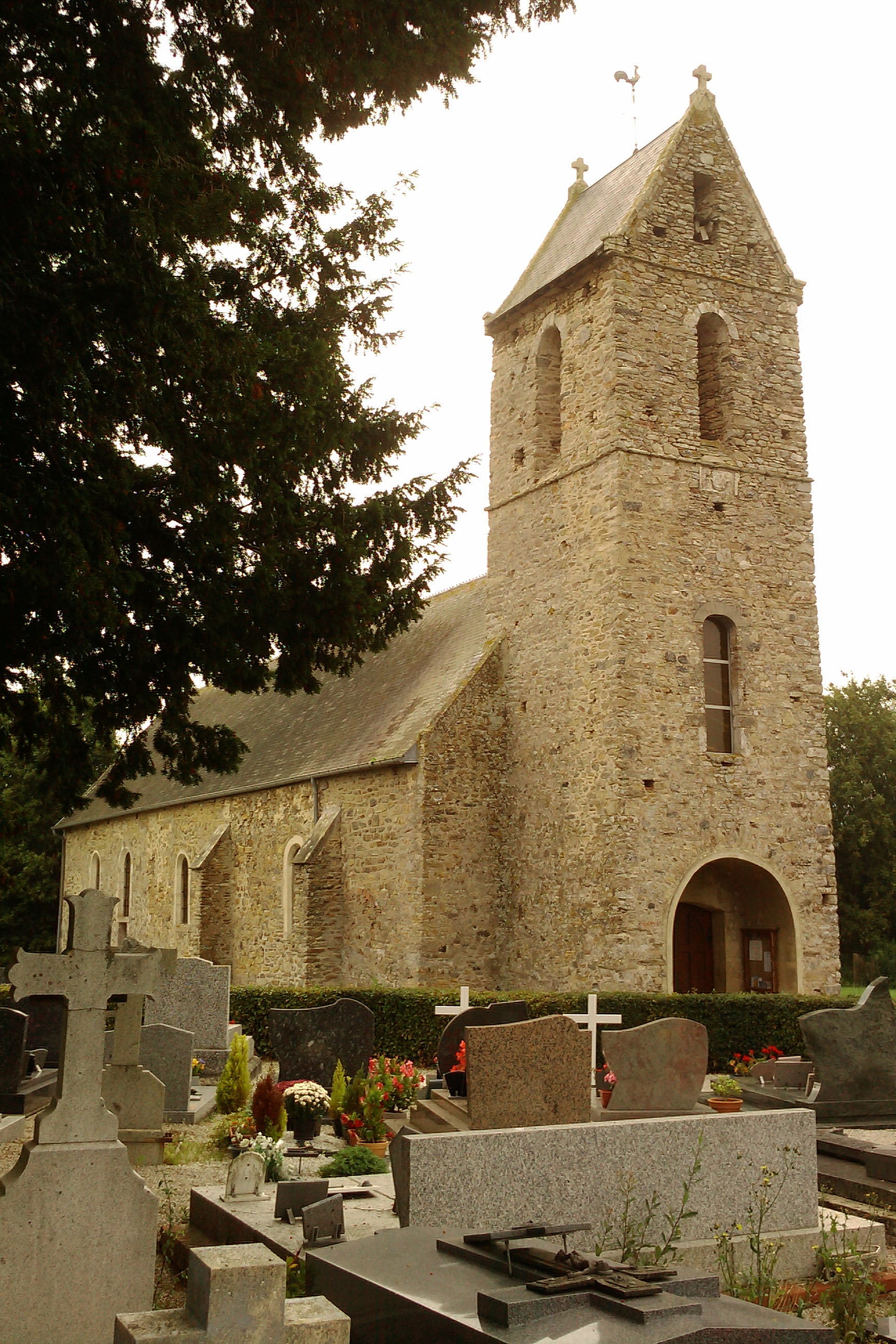
- The church of Saint-Pierre
- Location of Le Mesnil-Eury
- Location within France Location within Normandy
- Coordinates: 49°09′08″N 1°14′10″W
- Country: France
- Region: Normandy
- Department: Manche
- Arrondissement: Saint-Lô
- Canton: Saint-Lô-1
- Intercommunality: Saint-Lô Agglo

Government
  - Mayor (2020–2026): Erick Lejolivet
- Area^{1}: 3.46 km^{2} (1.34 sq mi)
- Elevation: 24 m (79 ft)
- Highest elevation: 33 m (108 ft)
- Lowest elevation: 2 m (6.6 ft)
- Population (2023): 188
  - Density: 54.3/km^{2} (141/sq mi)
- Demonym: Mesnileuryais
- Time zone: UTC+01:00 (CET)
  - Summer (DST): UTC+02:00 (CEST)
- INSEE/Postal code: 50310 /50570
- ^{1} French Land Register data, which excludes lakes, ponds, glaciers > 1 km^{2} (0.386 sq mi or 247 acres) and river estuaries.

Le Mesnil-Eury (French pronunciation: [lə menil øʁi]) is a commune in the Manche department in Normandy in north-western France.

== See also ==
- Communes of the Manche department
