= Montabot =

- Commune
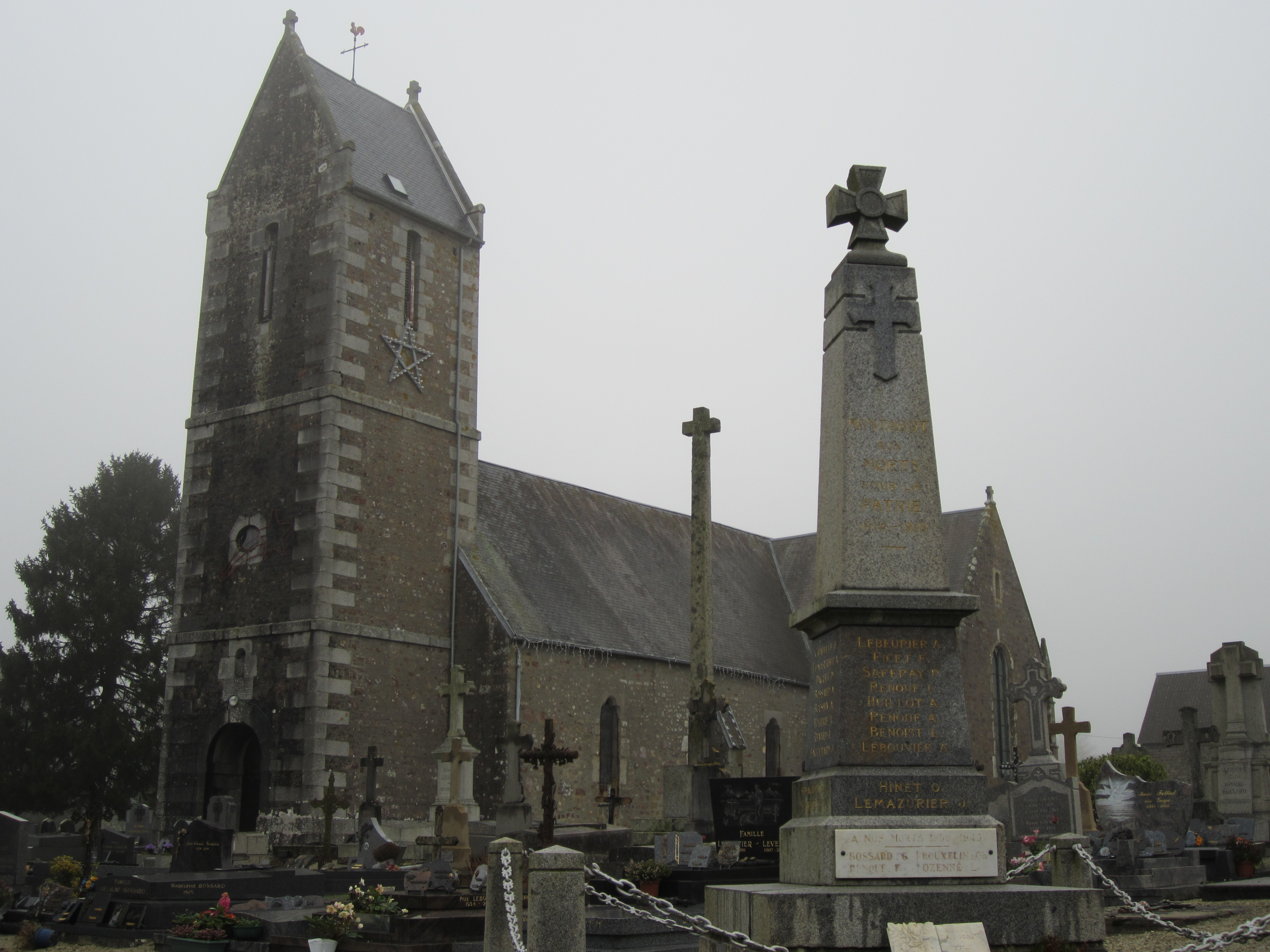
- The church of Notre-Dame
- Location of Montabot
- Location within France Location within Normandy
- Coordinates: 48°56′07″N 1°07′26″W
- Country: France
- Region: Normandy
- Department: Manche
- Arrondissement: Saint-Lô
- Canton: Villedieu-les-Poêles-Rouffigny
- Intercommunality: Villedieu Intercom

Government
  - Mayor (2020–2026): Jean Patrick Audoux
- Area^{1}: 11.56 km^{2} (4.46 sq mi)
- Elevation: 178 m (584 ft)
- Highest elevation: 272 m (892 ft)
- Lowest elevation: 85 m (279 ft)
- Population (2023): 271
  - Density: 23.4/km^{2} (60.7/sq mi)
- Demonym: Montabolais
- Time zone: UTC+01:00 (CET)
  - Summer (DST): UTC+02:00 (CEST)
- INSEE/Postal code: 50334 /50410
- ^{1} French Land Register data, which excludes lakes, ponds, glaciers > 1 km^{2} (0.386 sq mi or 247 acres) and river estuaries.

Montabot (French pronunciation: [mɔ̃tabo]) is a commune in the Manche department in Normandy in north-western France.

== See also ==
- Communes of the Manche department
