= Boisyvon =

- Commune
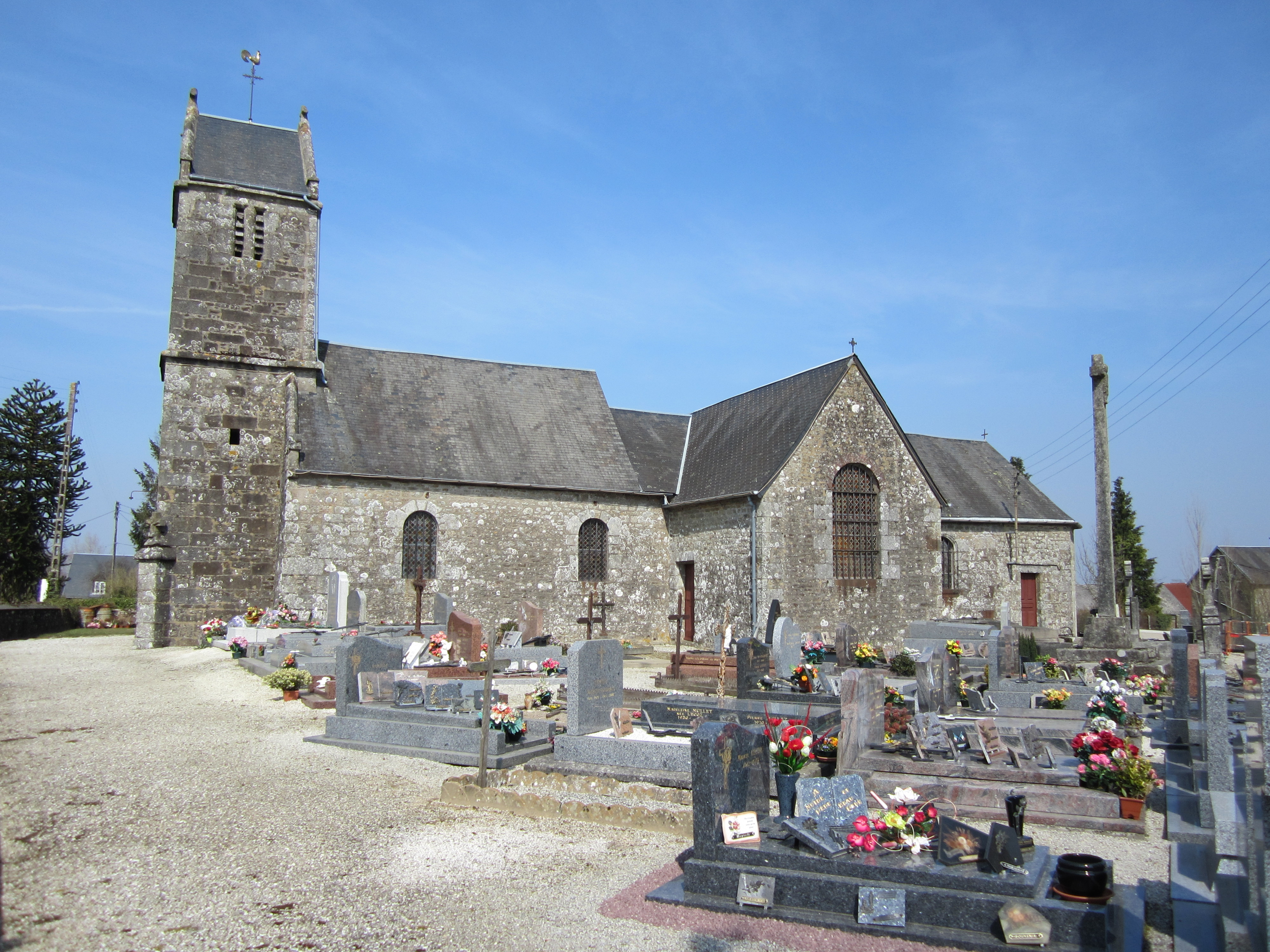
- The church of Saint-Pierre
- Location of Boisyvon
- Location within France Location within Normandy
- Coordinates: 48°48′23″N 1°07′40″W
- Country: France
- Region: Normandy
- Department: Manche
- Arrondissement: Avranches
- Canton: Villedieu-les-Poêles-Rouffigny
- Intercommunality: Villedieu Intercom

Government
  - Mayor (2020–2026): Stéphane Primois
- Area^{1}: 3.85 km^{2} (1.49 sq mi)
- Elevation: 250 m (820 ft)
- Highest elevation: 270 m (890 ft)
- Lowest elevation: 170 m (560 ft)
- Population (2023): 100
  - Density: 26/km^{2} (67/sq mi)
- Time zone: UTC+01:00 (CET)
  - Summer (DST): UTC+02:00 (CEST)
- INSEE/Postal code: 50062 /50800
- ^{1} French Land Register data, which excludes lakes, ponds, glaciers > 1 km^{2} (0.386 sq mi or 247 acres) and river estuaries.

Boisyvon (French pronunciation: [bwazivɔ̃]) is a commune located in the Manche department in Normandy in northwestern France.

== Population ==
Historical population
Year	Pop.	±% p.a.
1968	152	—
1975	142	−0.97%
1982	116	−2.85%
1990	105	−1.24%
1999	106	+0.11%
2007	114	+0.91%
2012	103	−2.01%
2017	113	+1.87%
2023	100	−2.02%
Source: INSEE

== See also ==
- Communes of the Manche department
