= Sainte-Cécile, Manche =

Sainte-Cécile
- Commune
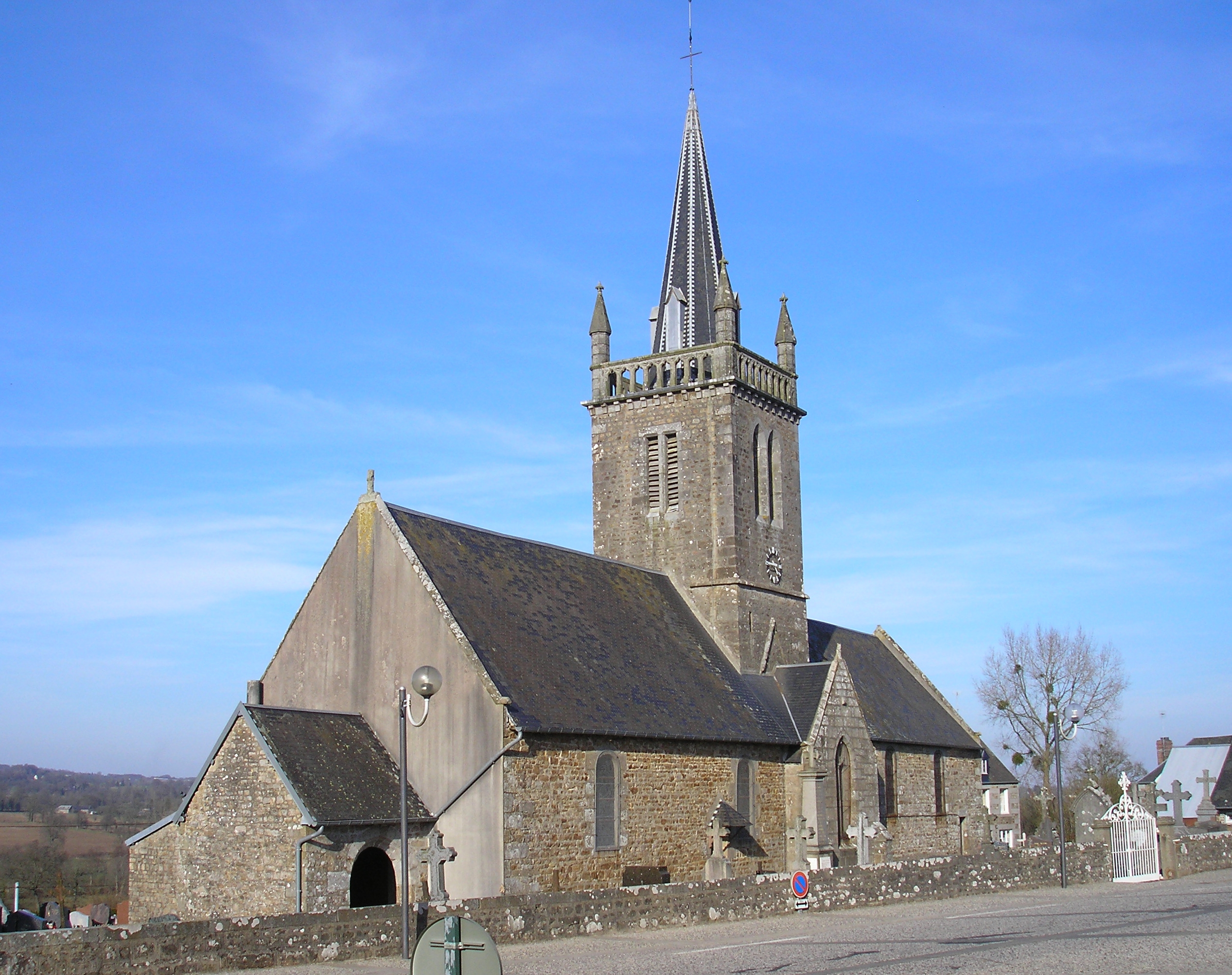
- The church of Sainte-Cécile
- Location of Sainte-Cécile
- Location within France Location within Normandy
- Coordinates: 48°50′11″N 1°11′17″W
- Country: France
- Region: Normandy
- Department: Manche
- Arrondissement: Saint-Lô
- Canton: Villedieu-les-Poêles-Rouffigny

Government
  - Mayor (2020–2026): Françoise Cahu
- Area^{1}: 11.29 km^{2} (4.36 sq mi)
- Elevation: 150 m (490 ft)
- Highest elevation: 226 m (741 ft)
- Lowest elevation: 112 m (367 ft)
- Population (2023): 792
  - Density: 70.2/km^{2} (182/sq mi)
- Time zone: UTC+01:00 (CET)
  - Summer (DST): UTC+02:00 (CEST)
- INSEE/Postal code: 50453 /50800
- ^{1} French Land Register data, which excludes lakes, ponds, glaciers > 1 km^{2} (0.386 sq mi or 247 acres) and river estuaries.

Sainte-Cécile (French pronunciation: [sɛ̃t sesil]) is a commune in the Manche department in Normandy in north-western France.

== See also ==
- Communes of the Manche department
