= La Trinité, Manche =

La Trinité
- Commune
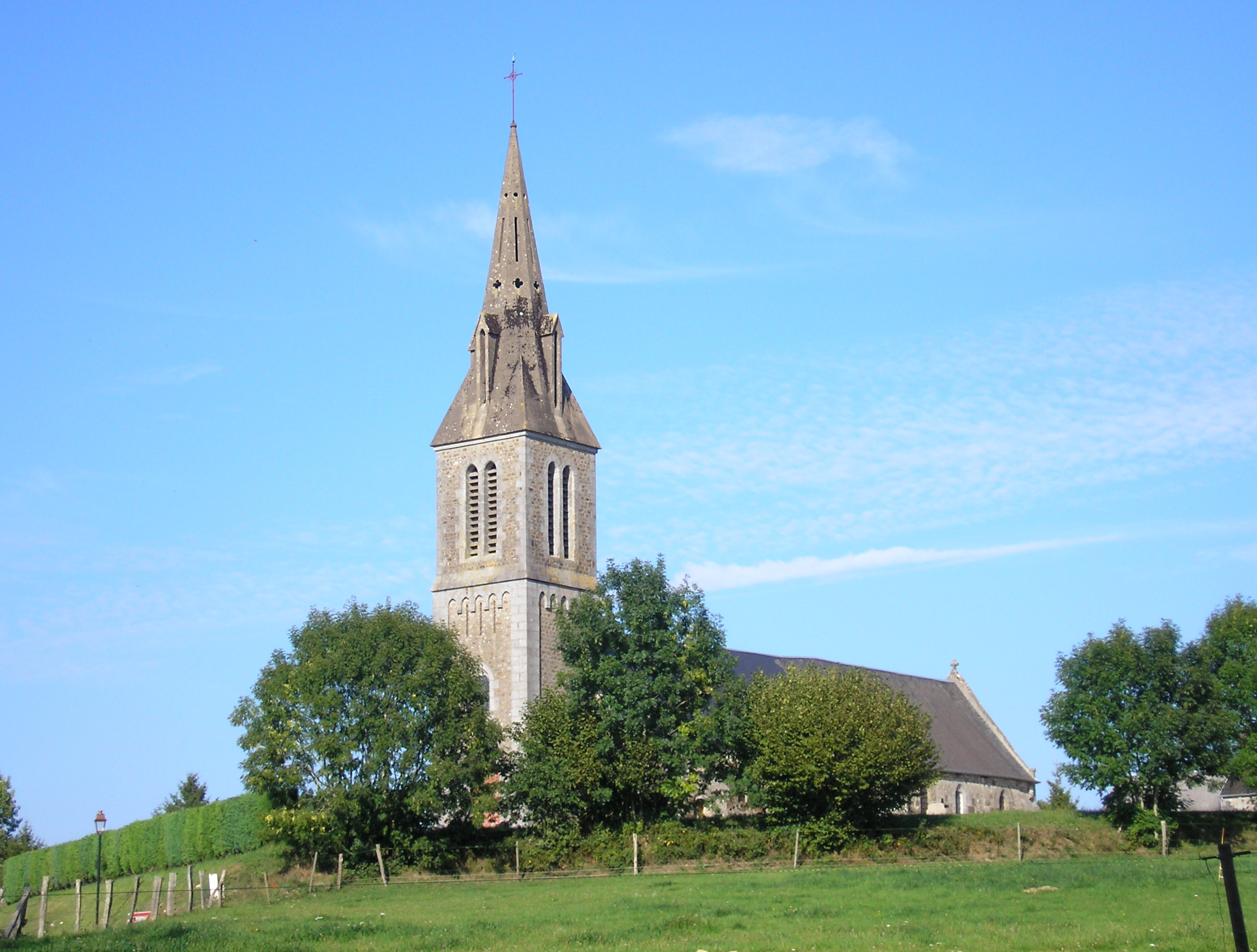
- The church of Sainte-Trinité
- Location of La Trinité
- Location within France Location within Normandy
- Coordinates: 48°47′29″N 1°14′02″W
- Country: France
- Region: Normandy
- Department: Manche
- Arrondissement: Saint-Lô
- Canton: Villedieu-les-Poêles-Rouffigny
- Intercommunality: Villedieu Intercom

Government
  - Mayor (2020–2026): Serge Bossard
- Area^{1}: 9.16 km^{2} (3.54 sq mi)
- Elevation: 190 m (620 ft)
- Highest elevation: 217 m (712 ft)
- Lowest elevation: 130 m (430 ft)
- Population (2023): 405
  - Density: 44.2/km^{2} (115/sq mi)
- Demonym: Trinitons
- Time zone: UTC+01:00 (CET)
  - Summer (DST): UTC+02:00 (CEST)
- INSEE/Postal code: 50607 /50800
- ^{1} French Land Register data, which excludes lakes, ponds, glaciers > 1 km^{2} (0.386 sq mi or 247 acres) and river estuaries.

La Trinité (French pronunciation: [la tʁinite]) is a commune in the Manche department in Normandy in north-western France.

== Heraldry ==
Arms of La Trinité	The arms of La Trinité are blazoned : Azure, on a fess Or a pellet (sable) between 2 escallops gules, in sinister chief a fleur de lys Or, and in base a lion argent maintaining a halbard Or.

== See also ==
- Communes of the Manche department
