= La Bloutière =

- Commune
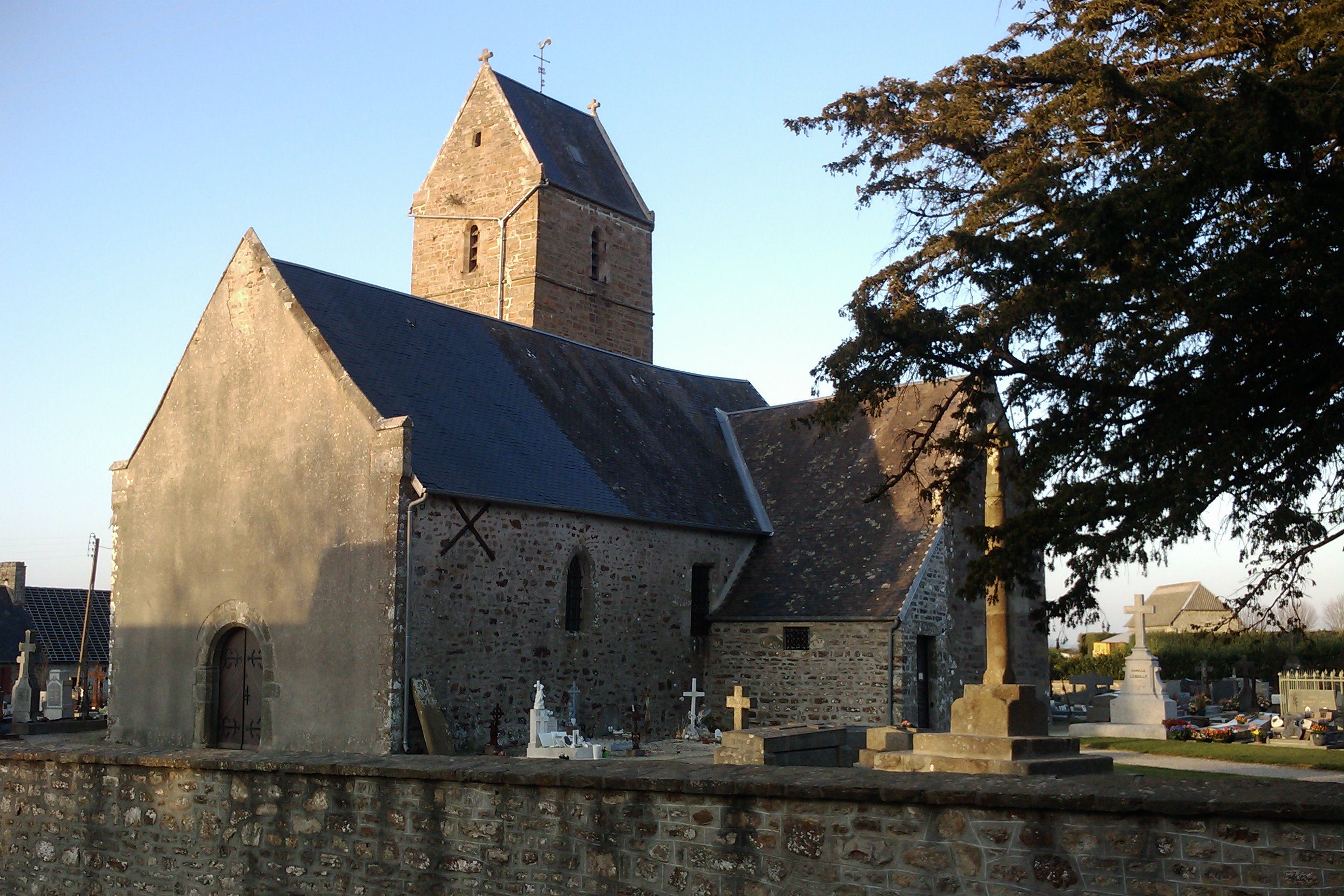
- The church of Notre-Dame
- Location of La Bloutière
- Location within France Location within Normandy
- Coordinates: 48°52′32″N 1°14′17″W
- Country: France
- Region: Normandy
- Department: Manche
- Arrondissement: Saint-Lô
- Canton: Villedieu-les-Poêles-Rouffigny
- Intercommunality: Villedieu Intercom

Government
  - Mayor (2020–2026): Patrick Orange
- Area^{1}: 9.31 km^{2} (3.59 sq mi)
- Highest elevation: 172 m (564 ft)
- Lowest elevation: 80 m (260 ft)
- Population (2023): 423
  - Density: 45.4/km^{2} (118/sq mi)
- Time zone: UTC+01:00 (CET)
  - Summer (DST): UTC+02:00 (CEST)
- INSEE/Postal code: 50060 /50800
- ^{1} French Land Register data, which excludes lakes, ponds, glaciers > 1 km^{2} (0.386 sq mi or 247 acres) and river estuaries.

La Bloutière (French pronunciation: [la blutjɛʁ]) is a commune in the Manche department in the Normandy region in northwestern France.

== Population ==
Historical population
Year	Pop.	±% p.a.
1968	398	—
1975	374	−0.88%
1982	418	+1.60%
1990	428	+0.30%
1999	418	−0.26%
2007	396	−0.67%
2012	411	+0.75%
2017	428	+0.81%
2023	423	−0.20%
Source: INSEE

== See also ==
- Communes of the Manche department
