= Maupertuis, Manche =

Commune in Normandy

Maupertuis
- Commune
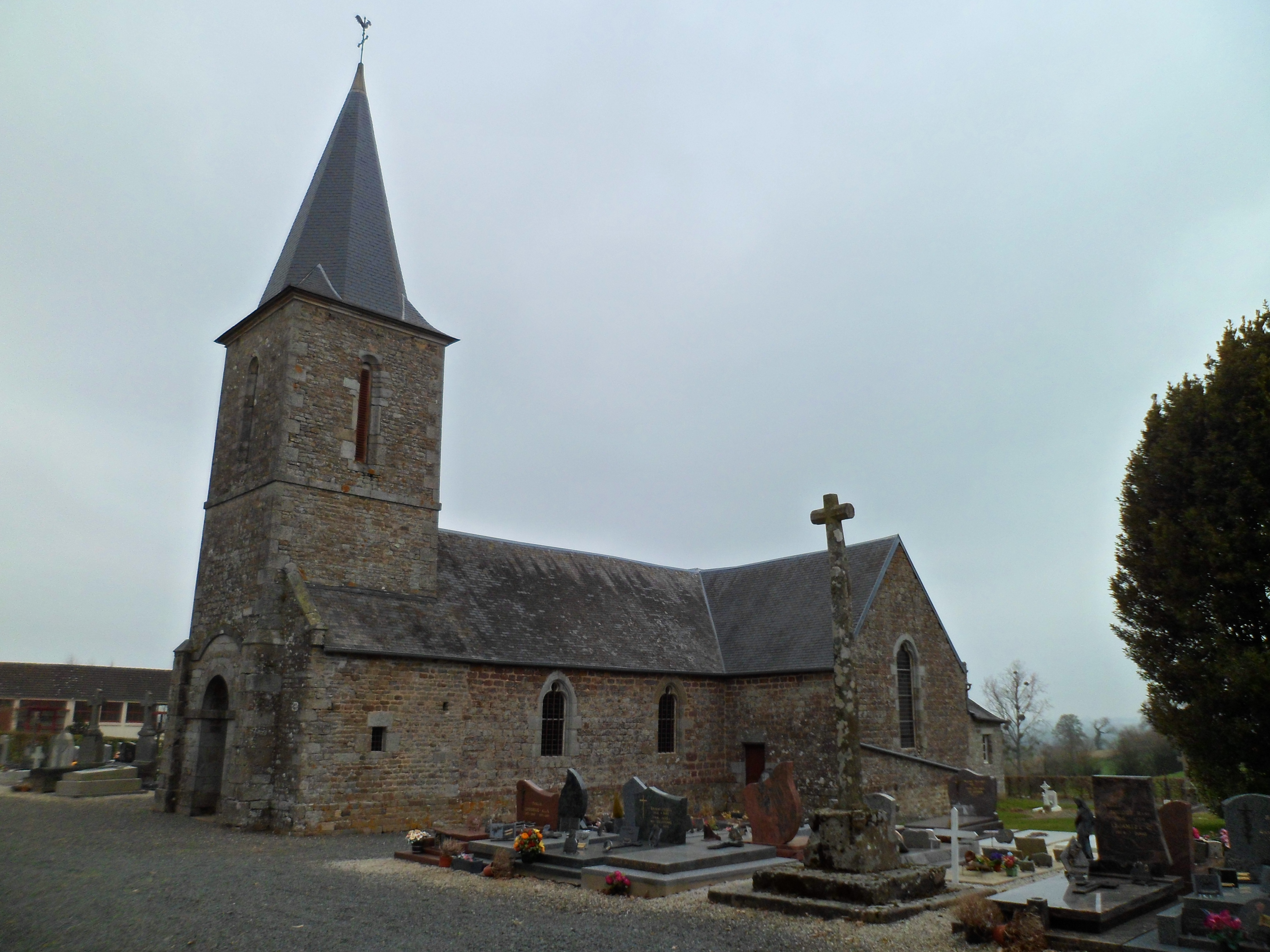
- Saint-Pierre de Maupertuis church
- Location of Maupertuis
- Location within France Location within Normandy
- Coordinates: 48°57′19″N 1°12′00″W
- Country: France
- Region: Normandy
- Department: Manche
- Arrondissement: Saint-Lô
- Canton: Villedieu-les-Poêles-Rouffigny
- Intercommunality: Villedieu Intercom

Government
  - Mayor (2020–2026): Damien Lebouvier
- Area^{1}: 5.41 km^{2} (2.09 sq mi)
- Elevation: 168 m (551 ft)
- Highest elevation: 171 m (561 ft)
- Lowest elevation: 104 m (341 ft)
- Population (2023): 145
  - Density: 26.8/km^{2} (69.4/sq mi)
- Demonym: Maupertuisiens
- Time zone: UTC+01:00 (CET)
  - Summer (DST): UTC+02:00 (CEST)
- INSEE/Postal code: 50295 /50410
- ^{1} French Land Register data, which excludes lakes, ponds, glaciers > 1 km^{2} (0.386 sq mi or 247 acres) and river estuaries.

Maupertuis (French pronunciation: [mopɛʁtɥi]) is a commune in the Manche department in Normandy in north-western France.

== See also ==
- Communes of the Manche department
