= Chérencé-le-Héron =

- Commune
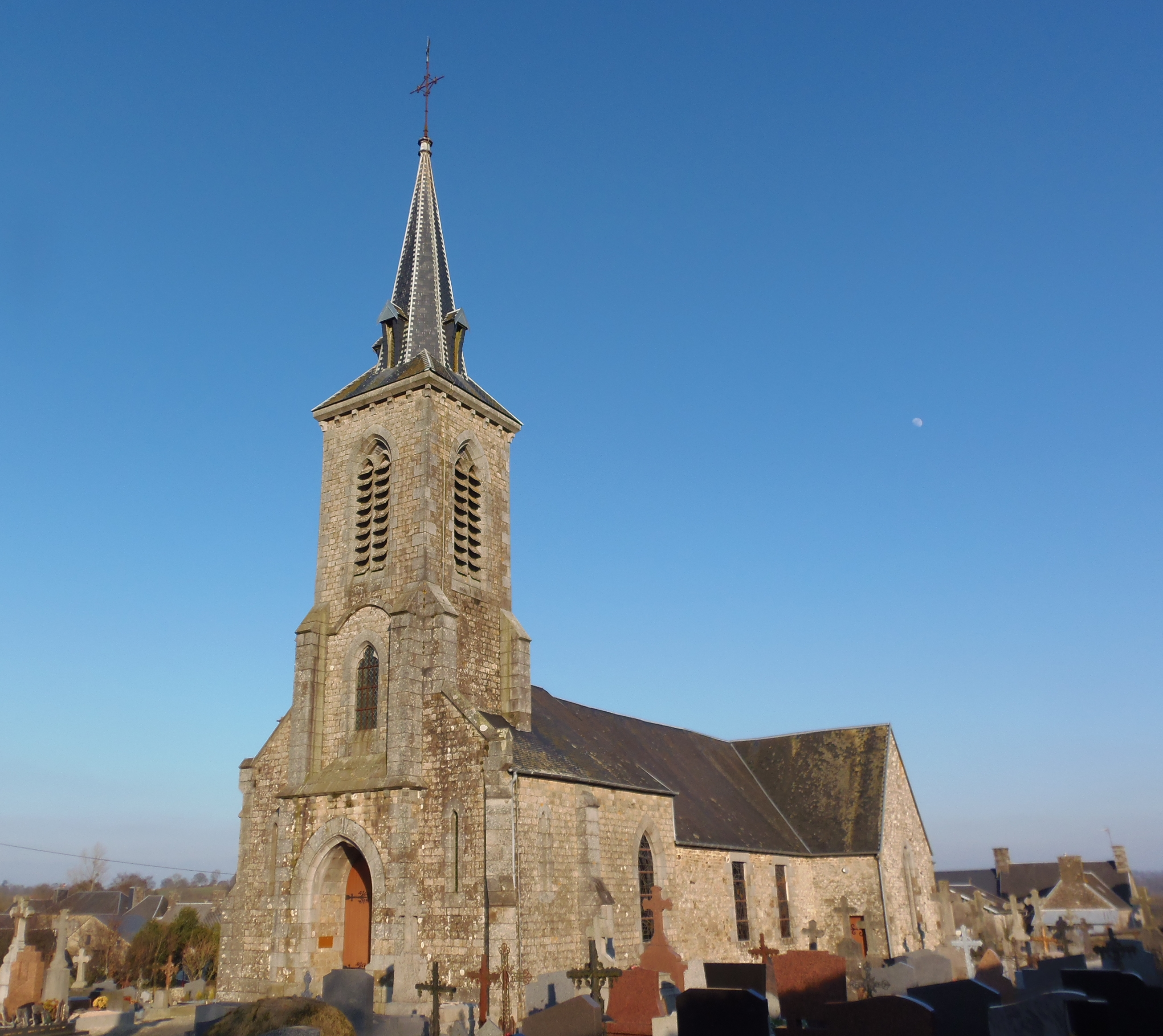
- The church of Notre-Dame
- Location of Chérencé-le-Héron
- Location within France Location within Normandy
- Coordinates: 48°48′10″N 1°11′44″W
- Country: France
- Region: Normandy
- Department: Manche
- Arrondissement: Saint-Lô
- Canton: Villedieu-les-Poêles-Rouffigny
- Intercommunality: Villedieu Intercom

Government
  - Mayor (2020–2026): Joel Plaine
- Area^{1}: 9.54 km^{2} (3.68 sq mi)
- Elevation: 230 m (750 ft)
- Highest elevation: 226 m (741 ft)
- Lowest elevation: 129 m (423 ft)
- Population (2023): 436
  - Density: 45.7/km^{2} (118/sq mi)
- Time zone: UTC+01:00 (CET)
  - Summer (DST): UTC+02:00 (CEST)
- INSEE/Postal code: 50130 /50800
- ^{1} French Land Register data, which excludes lakes, ponds, glaciers > 1 km^{2} (0.386 sq mi or 247 acres) and river estuaries.

Chérencé-le-Héron (French pronunciation: [ʃeʁɑ̃se lə eʁɔ̃]) is a commune in the Manche department in Normandy in north-western France.

== See also ==
- Communes of the Manche department
