= Bourguenolles =

- Commune
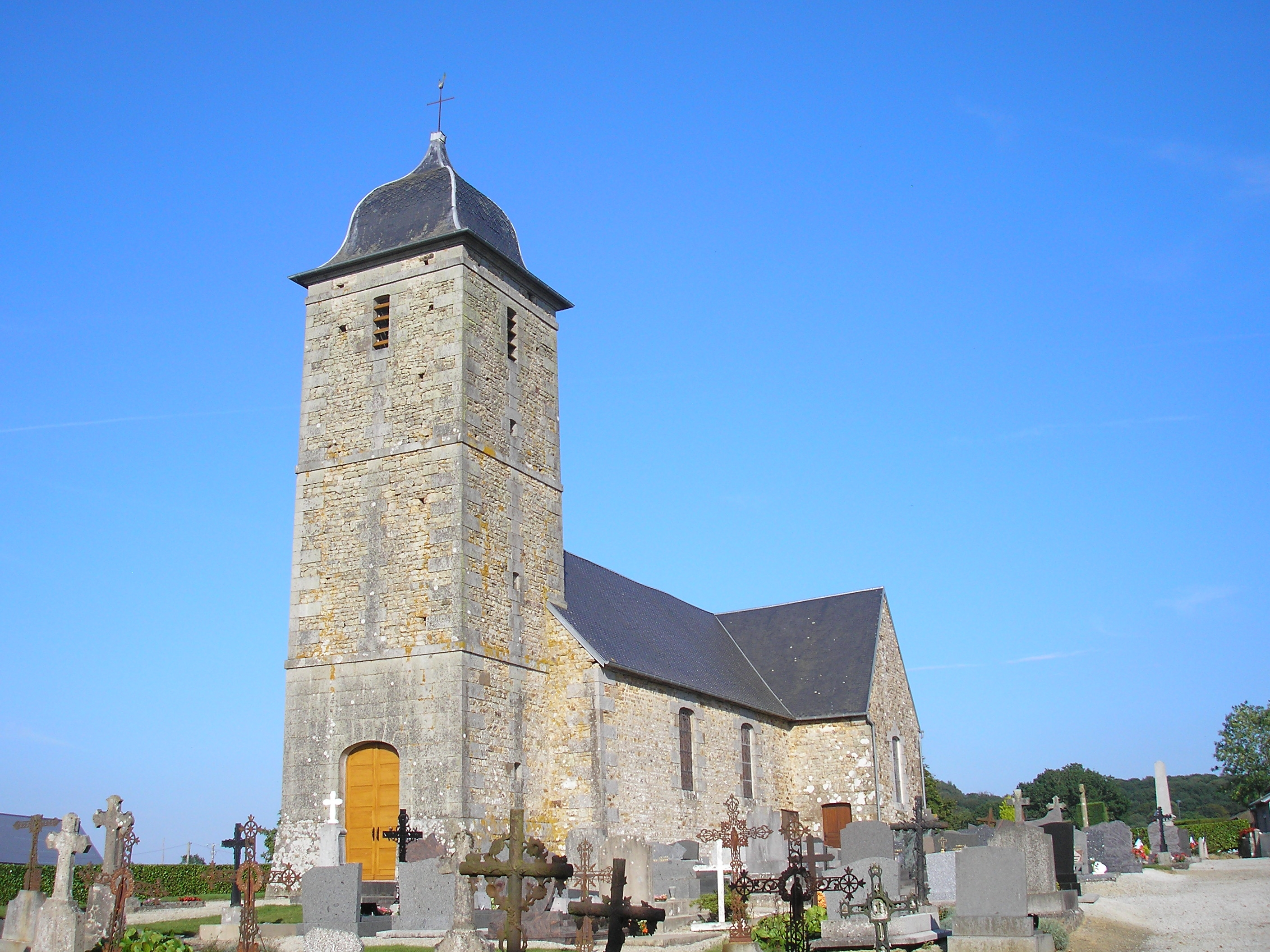
- The church of Saint-Barthélémy
- Location of Bourguenolles
- Location within France Location within Normandy
- Coordinates: 48°48′16″N 1°17′47″W
- Country: France
- Region: Normandy
- Department: Manche
- Arrondissement: Saint-Lô
- Canton: Villedieu-les-Poêles-Rouffigny
- Intercommunality: Villedieu Intercom

Government
  - Mayor (2020–2026): Daniel Bidet
- Area^{1}: 7.65 km^{2} (2.95 sq mi)
- Highest elevation: 184 m (604 ft)
- Lowest elevation: 91 m (299 ft)
- Population (2023): 349
  - Density: 45.6/km^{2} (118/sq mi)
- Time zone: UTC+01:00 (CET)
  - Summer (DST): UTC+02:00 (CEST)
- INSEE/Postal code: 50069 /50800
- ^{1} French Land Register data, which excludes lakes, ponds, glaciers > 1 km^{2} (0.386 sq mi or 247 acres) and river estuaries.

Bourguenolles (French pronunciation: [buʁɡənɔl]) is a commune in the Manche department in Normandy in northwestern France.

== Population ==
Historical population
| Year | Pop. | ±% p.a. |
|---|---|---|
| 1968 | 256 | — |
| 1975 | 225 | −1.83% |
| 1982 | 206 | −1.25% |
| 1990 | 250 | +2.45% |
| 1999 | 244 | −0.27% |
| 2007 | 280 | +1.74% |
| 2012 | 335 | +3.65% |
| 2017 | 344 | +0.53% |
| 2023 | 349 | +0.24% |
Source: INSEE

== See also ==
- Communes of the Manche department
