= Canton of Villedieu-les-Poêles-Rouffigny =

Coordinates: 48.84°N 1.22°W

The canton of Villedieu-les-Poêles-Rouffigny (before March 2020: canton of Villedieu-les-Poêles) is an administrative division of the Manche department, northwestern France. Its borders were modified at the French canton reorganisation which came into effect in March 2015. Its seat is in Villedieu-les-Poêles-Rouffigny.

It consists of the following communes:

1. Beslon
2. La Bloutière
3. Boisyvon
4. Bourguenolles
5. Champrepus
6. La Chapelle-Cécelin
7. Chérencé-le-Héron
8. La Colombe
9. Coulouvray-Boisbenâtre
10. Fleury
11. Le Guislain
12. La Haye-Bellefond
13. La Lande-d'Airou
14. Margueray
15. Maupertuis
16. Montabot
17. Montbray
18. Morigny
19. Percy-en-Normandie
20. Sainte-Cécile
21. Saint-Martin-le-Bouillant
22. Saint-Maur-des-Bois
23. Saint-Pois
24. Le Tanu
25. La Trinité
26. Villebaudon
27. Villedieu-les-Poêles-Rouffigny
