= Pont-Farcy =

- Part of Tessy-Bocage
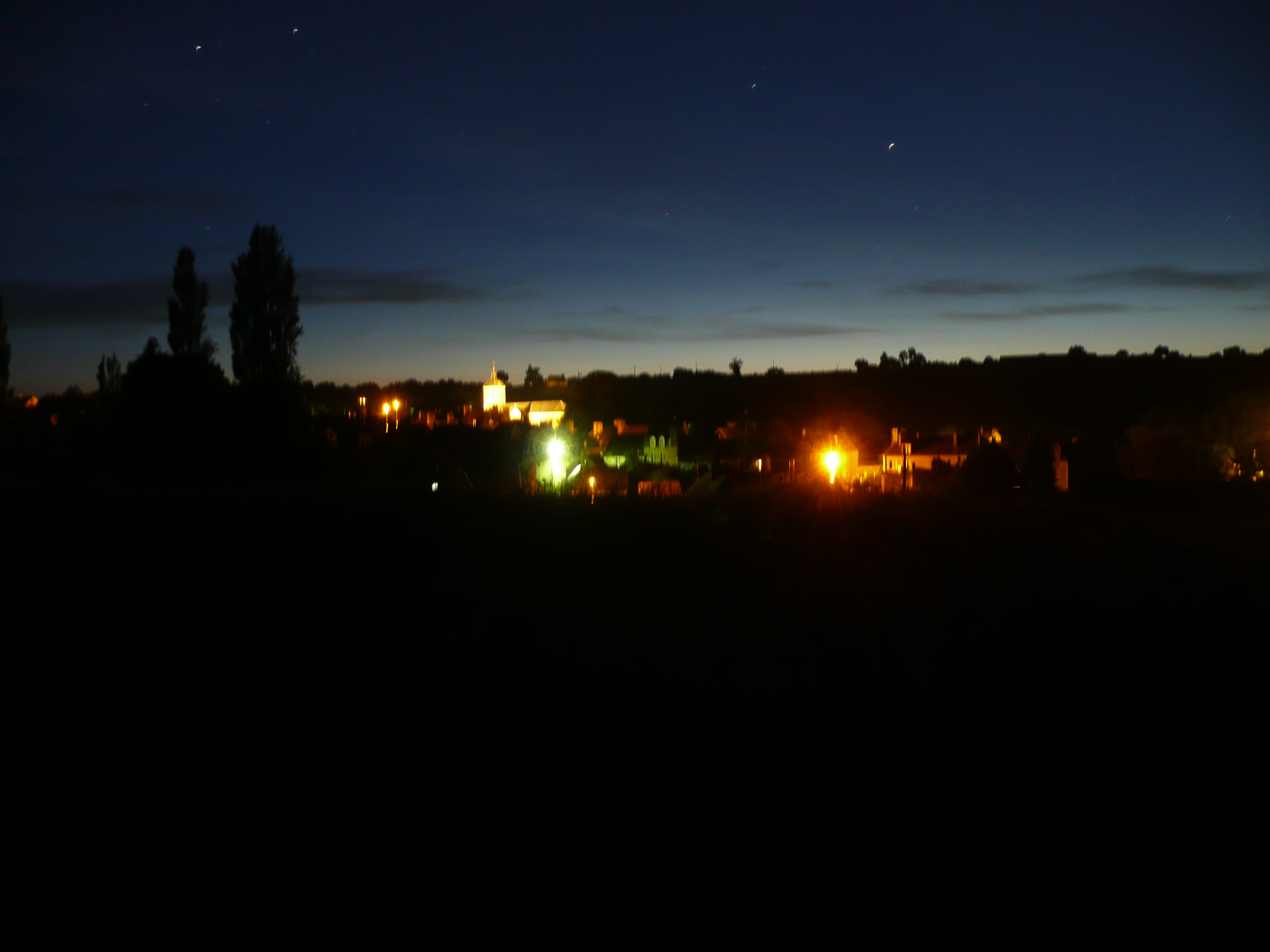
- Pont-Farcy from L'Archette

- Coat of arms
- Location of Pont-Farcy
- Location within France Location within Normandy
- Coordinates: 48°56′13″N 1°02′05″W
- Country: France
- Region: Normandy
- Department: Manche
- Arrondissement: Saint-Lô
- Canton: Condé-sur-Vire
- Commune: Tessy-Bocage
- Area^{1}: 13.45 km^{2} (5.19 sq mi)
- Elevation: 86 m (282 ft)
- Highest elevation: 253 m (830 ft)
- Lowest elevation: 39 m (128 ft)
- Population (2018): 544
  - Density: 40.4/km^{2} (105/sq mi)
- Time zone: UTC+01:00 (CET)
  - Summer (DST): UTC+02:00 (CEST)
- Postal code: 50420
- ^{1} French Land Register data, which excludes lakes, ponds, glaciers > 1 km^{2} (0.386 sq mi or 247 acres) and river estuaries.

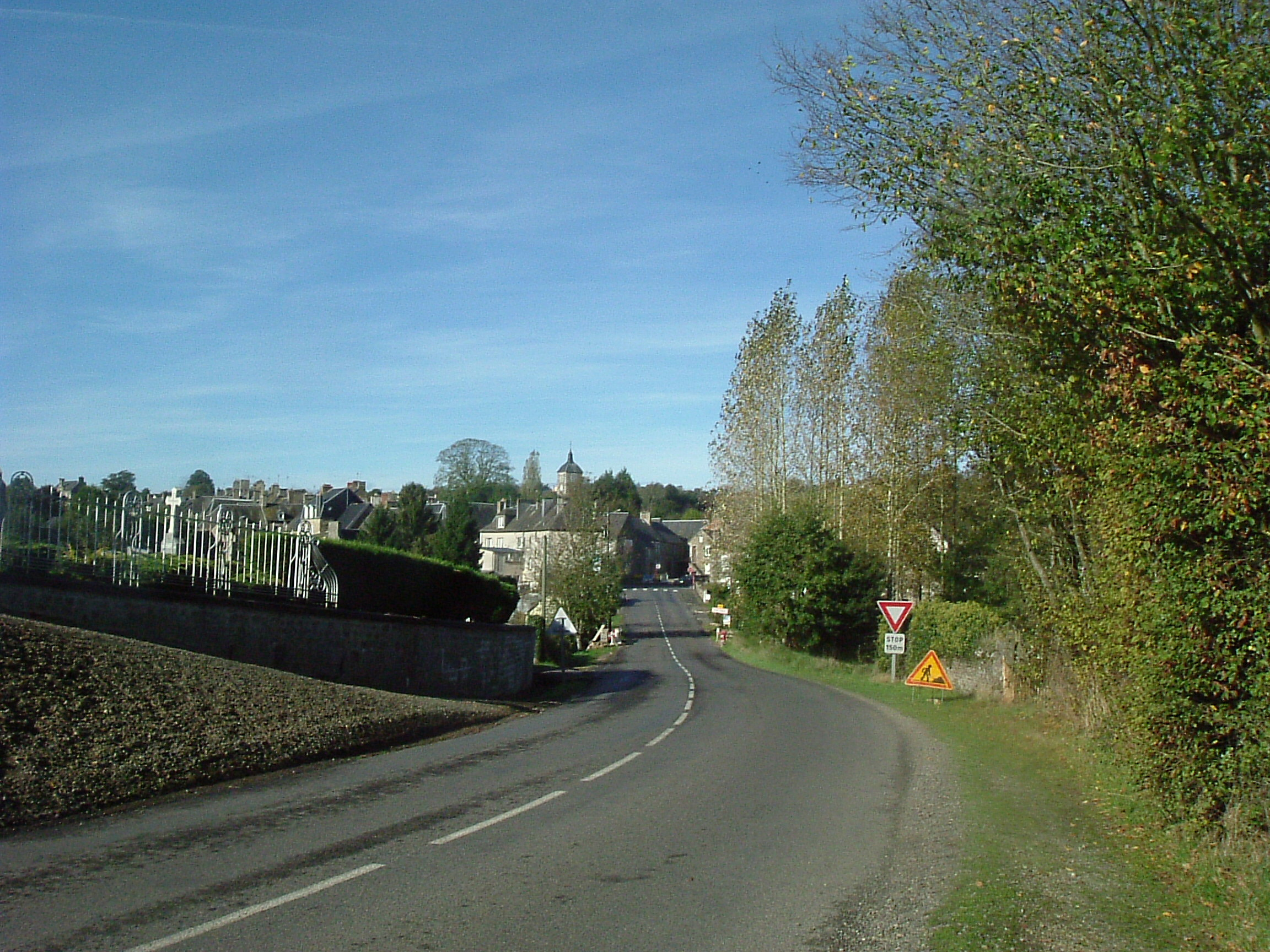
The D52 Road in Calvados, France approaching Pont-Farcy, the cemetery is to the left

Pont-Farcy (French pronunciation: [pɔ̃ faʁsi]) is a former commune in the Manche department in the Normandy region in northwestern France. Before 1 January 2018, it was part of the Calvados department. On 1 January 2018, it was merged into the commune of Tessy-Bocage.

== History ==
Pont-Farcy has its origins in Gallo-Roman times: the town has always been an important crossing place due to its bridge over the River Vire. It was also passed through by the Dukes of Normandy. It is likely that some of the families who settled in Cheshire after 1066 came from the area. Before the 20th century, there is little evidence to suggest the village held much more than peasants; it probably wasn't considered a particularly important spot, as Saint-Sever-Calvados was. During the 20th century, the village became a thriving river port, and a tow path for barges starts here and reaches as far as the Baie de Seine and the Normandy landing beaches. The village originally had a railway bridge over the Vire, but this was blown up by the Nazis upon their retreat from the village in 1944. Pont-Farcy was liberated by the American 35th Infantry Division on 2 August 1944.

In the latter half of the 20th century the population has dropped from nearly 1,000 to about 500, although in recent years it has grown slightly. This has a lot to do with the Autoroute which passes just north of the village.

== Population ==
Historical population
Year	Pop.	±% p.a.
1962	801	—
1968	766	−0.74%
1975	613	−3.13%
1982	534	−1.95%
1990	487	−1.15%
1999	512	+0.56%
2006	517	+0.14%
2018	544	+0.43%
Source: EHESS and INSEE

Its inhabitants are known as Farcy-Pontains in French.

== Geography ==
The village is located on the D307a road, and the nearest sizable villages are Villedieu-les-Poêles to the southwest, Saint-Martin-des-Besaces to the northeast, Tessy-sur-Vire and Saint-Lô to the north, and Sainte-Marie-Outre-l'Eau, Beaumesnil and Vire to the south.

Pont-Farcy is a small rural village, surrounded by many small hamlets (some of which are no more than a single farm); sizable settlements neighbouring Pont-Farcy are named above. Pont-Farcy has a petrol station, a bar and newsagents, a hotel and restaurant called "Le Coq Hardi", a church with graveyard and a separate cemetery, the latter of which practices the French custom of naming the living on the tombstones (leaving the year of death blank). There is also a campsite along the banks of the River Vire, with an outdoor pursuits centre from which bikes and canoes can be hired.

== Personalities ==
One of the village's most famous residents is the Russian-born artist Timur D'Vatz, who is currently exhibiting in London, Venice, New York City and Paris.
