= Lamberville =

Lamberville may refer to the following places in France:

- Lamberville, Manche, in the Manche département
- Lamberville, Seine-Maritime, in the Seine-Maritime département

== See also ==
- Lambertville (disambiguation)
