= Notre Dame de France =

Coordinates: 51.511308°N 0.130038°W

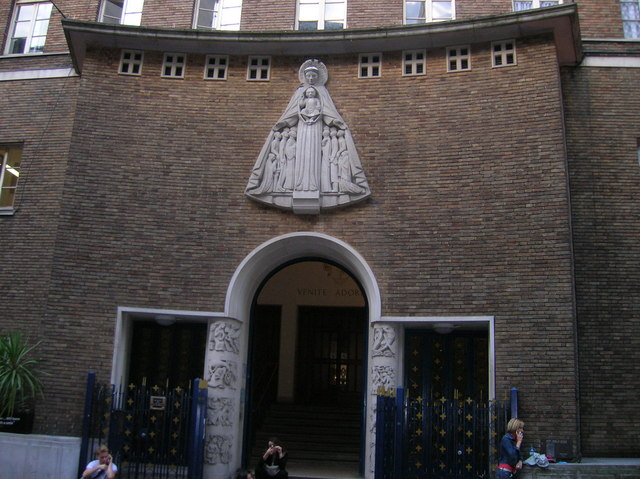
- Entrance to Notre Dame de France

- Location of church within Westminster, London
- Location: Leicester Square London
- Country: England
- Language(s): French & English
- Denomination: Roman Catholic
- Website: ndfchurch.org

History
- Status: Parish Church
- Founder: Father Charles Faure
- Dedication: Mary (mother of Jesus)
- Consecrated: 11 June 1868

Architecture
- Functional status: Active
- Heritage designation: Grade II
- Designated: 25 September 1998
- Architect(s): Louis-Auguste Boileau; Hector Corfiato
- Architectural type: Cast-iron, Circular

Administration
- Archdiocese: Westminster

Notre Dame de France is a French Catholic church in London's West End. It is located on Leicester Place just north of Leicester Square.

== History ==
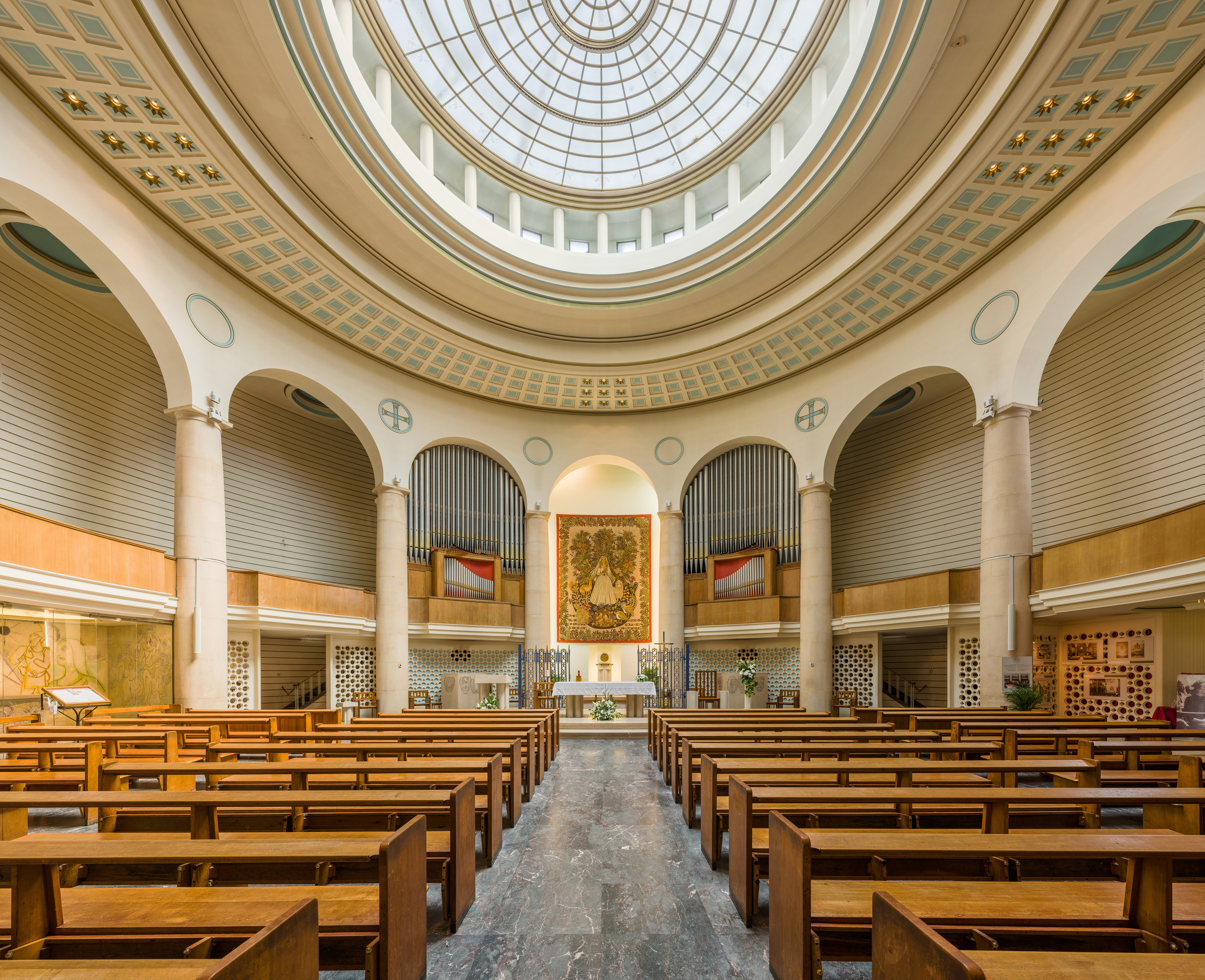
Interior of Notre Dame de France

The origins of the church date back to the mid 1800s, however, the building itself is older. In 1861, Cardinal Wiseman, Archbishop of Westminster, asked the Marist Fathers to establish a mission to support the large French community in the area, and placed Father Charles Faure in charge of the project. On 25 March 1865, Father Faure purchased a circular building off Leicester Square. It was known as Burford's Panorama and was an early form of visual entertainment in the West End, built as a tourist attraction in the early 1800s. Faure employed the services of French architect Louis-Auguste Boileau, an early promoter of cast iron architecture, to transform this building into a church. He retained the rotunda, hence the circular shape of the present building. Upon consecration in 1868, it was the first cast-iron church built in London.

== Second World War ==
During the Battle of Britain in 1940, the church was badly damaged by bombing. The following year, it re-opened after extensive structural repairs overseen by Father Laurent. However, it still needed much work, and it was not until 1948 that repairs were completed under the supervision of the new Superior, Father Deguerry and with the support of French Ambassador Jean Chauvel, the French cultural attaché René Varin and the British Prime Minister, Anthony Eden. René Varin encouraged the creation of a sacred space that would honour France. In the period between 1953 and 1960, he approached eminent artists of the time to work on the decoration of the rebuilt church.

The architect for the rebuilding of the church in 1953-55 was Hector Corfiato.

== Artwork ==
Over the entrance is a bas relief carving of Our Lady of Mercy (1953) by Georges-Laurent Saupique.

The tapestry behind the main altar is by Dom Robert, a Benedictine monk of the En-Calcat Abbey, on the theme of Paradise on earth, with references to the Creation and to Wisdom, the New Eve. The quotation is from the book of Proverbs.

The Lady Chapel contains murals by Jean Cocteau (1960) depicting the Annunciation, Crucifixion and Assumption. The murals were restored in 2012. The wooden board that was painted by Cocteau was removed to reveal the mosaic of the Nativity (1954) by Boris Anrep on the altar; the Cocteau painting remains on display on an adjacent wall.

There is a modern altarpiece showing 'The Flight of Holy Family into Egypt' by Timur D'Vatz (2016).

== Pipe organ ==
The organ was built by August Gern in 1868. It was enlarged in 1938 by J. W. Walker & Sons Ltd, dismantled during the 1940 blitz of London and rebuilt in 1955 by J.W. Walker & Sons. It was renovated in 1986 and modernised and refurbished by B.C. Shepherd & Son in 2010.

== Pastoral services ==
The modern church provides pastoral services to the growing French community in London, and has developed a series of charitable and evangelizing initiatives with other local Catholic churches of the West End.

== See also ==
- French migration to the United Kingdom
