= Placy-Montaigu =

- Part of Saint-Amand-Villages
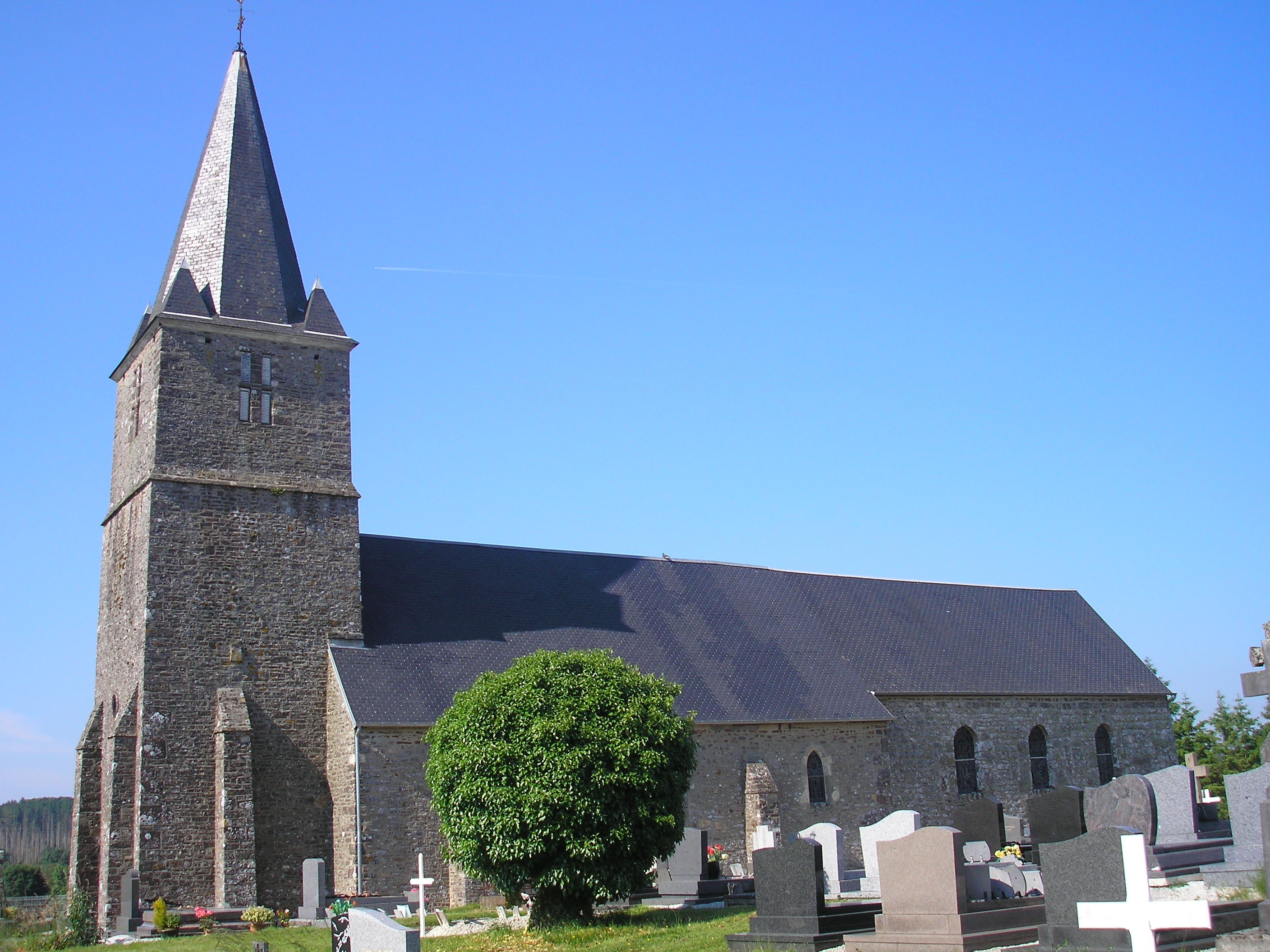
- The church of Saint-Nicolas
- Location of Placy-Montaigu
- Location within France Location within Normandy
- Coordinates: 49°01′52″N 0°54′17″W
- Country: France
- Region: Normandy
- Department: Manche
- Arrondissement: Saint-Lô
- Canton: Condé-sur-Vire
- Commune: Saint-Amand-Villages
- Area^{1}: 8.99 km^{2} (3.47 sq mi)
- Elevation: 170 m (560 ft)
- Highest elevation: 228 m (748 ft)
- Lowest elevation: 109 m (358 ft)
- Population (2022): 212
  - Density: 23.6/km^{2} (61.1/sq mi)
- Time zone: UTC+01:00 (CET)
  - Summer (DST): UTC+02:00 (CEST)
- Postal code: 50160
- ^{1} French Land Register data, which excludes lakes, ponds, glaciers > 1 km^{2} (0.386 sq mi or 247 acres) and river estuaries.

Placy-Montaigu (French pronunciation: [plasi mɔ̃tɛɡy]) is a former commune in the Manche department in Normandy in north-western France. On 1 January 2017, it was merged into the new commune Saint-Amand-Villages.

== See also ==
- Communes of the Manche department
