= Troisgots =

- Part of Condé-sur-Vire
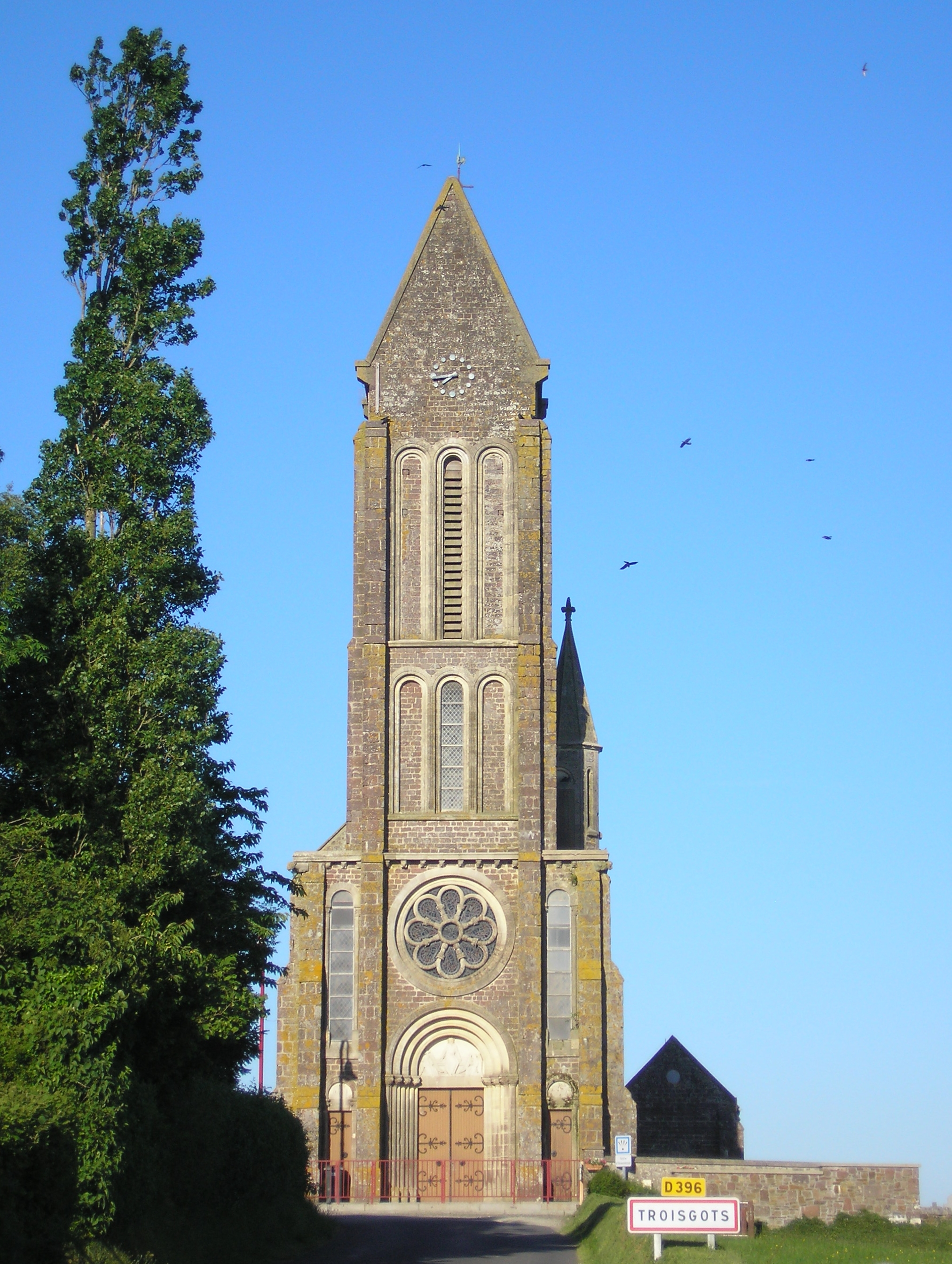
- The church of Saint-Lô
- Location of Troisgots
- Location within France Location within Normandy
- Coordinates: 49°00′43″N 1°04′19″W
- Country: France
- Region: Normandy
- Department: Manche
- Arrondissement: Saint-Lô
- Canton: Condé-sur-Vire
- Commune: Condé-sur-Vire
- Area^{1}: 7.53 km^{2} (2.91 sq mi)
- Highest elevation: 133 m (436 ft)
- Lowest elevation: 25 m (82 ft)
- Population (2018): 343
  - Density: 45.6/km^{2} (118/sq mi)
- Time zone: UTC+01:00 (CET)
  - Summer (DST): UTC+02:00 (CEST)
- Postal code: 50420
- ^{1} French Land Register data, which excludes lakes, ponds, glaciers > 1 km^{2} (0.386 sq mi or 247 acres) and river estuaries.

Troisgots (French pronunciation: [tʁwɑɡo]) is a former commune in the Manche department in Normandy in north-western France. On 1 January 2017, it was merged into the commune Condé-sur-Vire.

== Geography ==
The town of Troisgots is 6.5 kilometers north of Tessy-sur-Vire and 14 kilometers south of Saint-Lô, the prefecture of Manche.

The village of Troisgots is away from the main county roads. Two county roads intersect side in the village. The D 396 allows the West to find Moyon and east Torigni-sur-Vire . To the north, the D 159 include St. Romphaire and leads southeast to the site Chapelle-sur-Vire, on the road to Tessy Condé-sur-Vire . Starting from the D 396 east of the town, the D 259 reached more directly Condé northeast. The A84 is within 11 km to the south (exit 39) by Tessy-sur-Vire.

Troisgots is in the basin of the Vire delimiting the western territory. Its tributary, the Marqueran, acts as a southern boundary and a tributary of it delimits the southwest. The Northern Territory's water is collected by another tributary of the Vire, rejoining at Condé-sur-Vire .

The highest point (133 m) is located on the hill dominated by the town, north of it, near the place called the Presbytery. The lowest point (25 m) is the output of the Vire territory in the north, at the foot of this hill. The town is wooded.

The climate is oceanic as in western France. The nearest weather station is Pointe-du Roc Granville 42 km away, but Caen Carpiquet is less than 50 km distant.

The localities are, from north-west to the west, clockwise: the pear, the Aunay the Cancères the Chores, Rouland the cross, Pastairie (north), Mesnil-Guillaume, the Mountains, the Henrière the Vesquerie the tank, the Presbytery, the Angerie the Étournière the Herboudière the Russian Bos, Grand Val de Vire, the During the Petit Val de Vire (east), la Rocque, Chapelle-sur-Vire, Garden, Wood (south), Hamel, the Pézerie, Bourg, the Épannerie, Heath Mathieu, the Val Rainfray the Écannerie the Haberdashery and Couillardière (west).

== Toponymy ==
Troisgots is mentioned in the forms Tresgoth and Tresgoz in the 12th century, the spelling Troisgots appeared in the 18th century.

Some suggested so conjectural terms of former French tres, tre "beyond, through" (from the Latin trans) followed gaut "forest, woods, farmland, wasteland where grow scrub" (from the Germanic * walduz "forest", cf. German Wald, same direction) [2], that is to say "beyond the wood" by probably referring to the local topography and especially the hill down the slope to the course of the Vire is referred to the wood on the land registry .

That said, the old forms in -goth / -goz contradict this hypothesis as gaut has many variants attested Waut, gault, gaud, gal, etc., but not * got . In addition, any connection with the topography is hazardous. The shape Trois is a French language, as Treville was interpreted as the Norman term treis mean specifically "three". The second element -goth / -goz rather implies a relationship with the anthroponym Goz .

The name of the village is probably the origin of the surname Tresgots unless whether conversely, that historically almost exclusively located in the department of Manche 7 .

== See also ==
- Communes of the Manche department
