= Moyon =

Commune in Manche, France

- Part of Moyon Villages
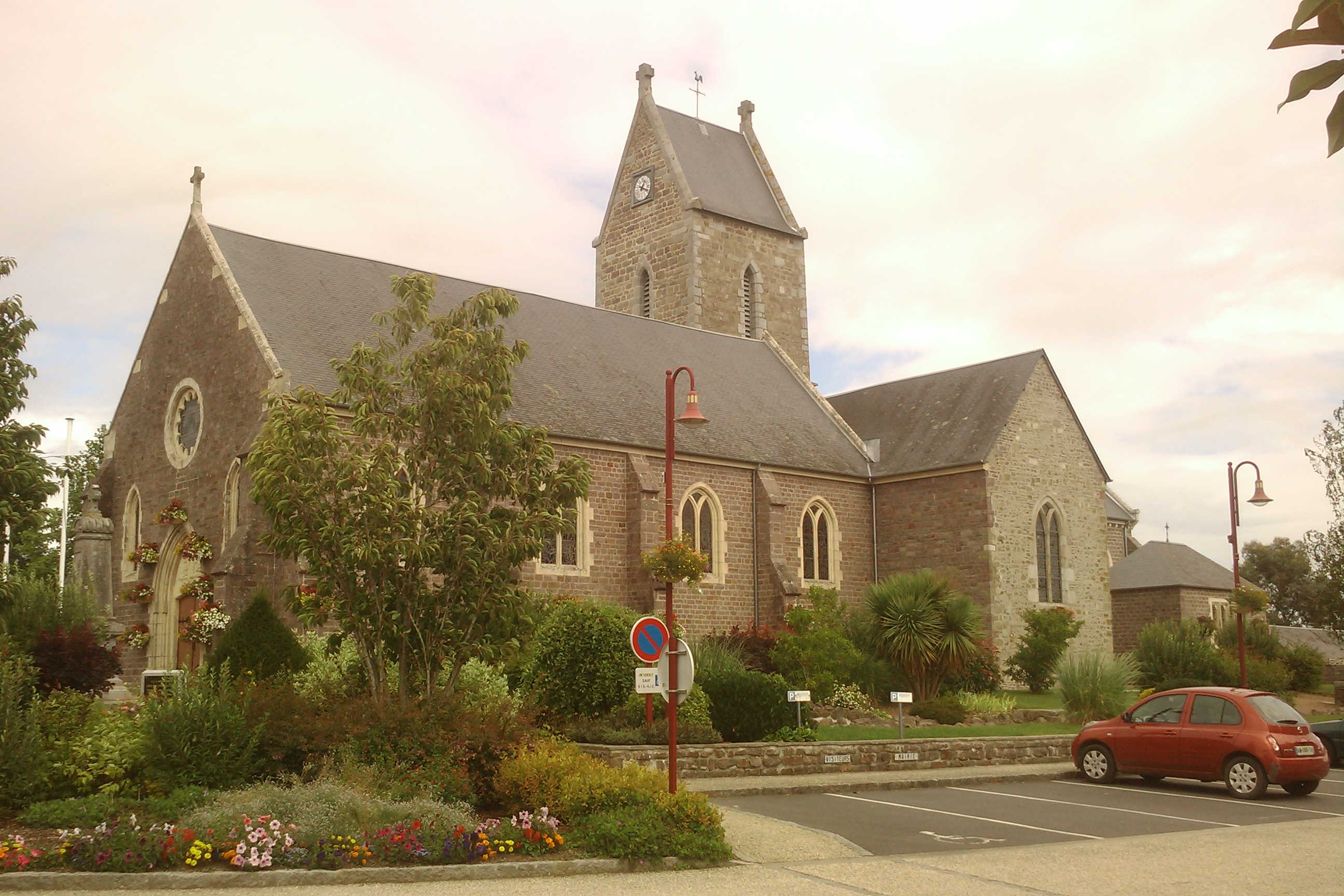
- The church of Saint-Germain
- Location of Moyon
- Location within France Location within Normandy
- Coordinates: 49°00′05″N 1°07′02″W
- Country: France
- Region: Normandy
- Department: Manche
- Arrondissement: Saint-Lô
- Canton: Condé-sur-Vire
- Commune: Moyon Villages
- Area^{1}: 23.74 km^{2} (9.17 sq mi)
- Elevation: 87 m (285 ft)
- Highest elevation: 145 m (476 ft)
- Lowest elevation: 50 m (160 ft)
- Population (2022): 1,098
  - Density: 46.25/km^{2} (119.8/sq mi)
- Demonym: Moyonnais
- Time zone: UTC+01:00 (CET)
  - Summer (DST): UTC+02:00 (CEST)
- Postal code: 50860
- Website: Official website
- ^{1} French Land Register data, which excludes lakes, ponds, glaciers > 1 km^{2} (0.386 sq mi or 247 acres) and river estuaries.

Moyon (French pronunciation: [mwajɔ̃]) is a former commune in the Manche department in Normandy in north-western France. On 1 January 2016, it was merged into the new commune of Moyon Villages.

== See also ==
- Communes of the Manche department
