= Saint-Amand, Manche =

Saint-Amand
- Part of Saint-Amand-Villages
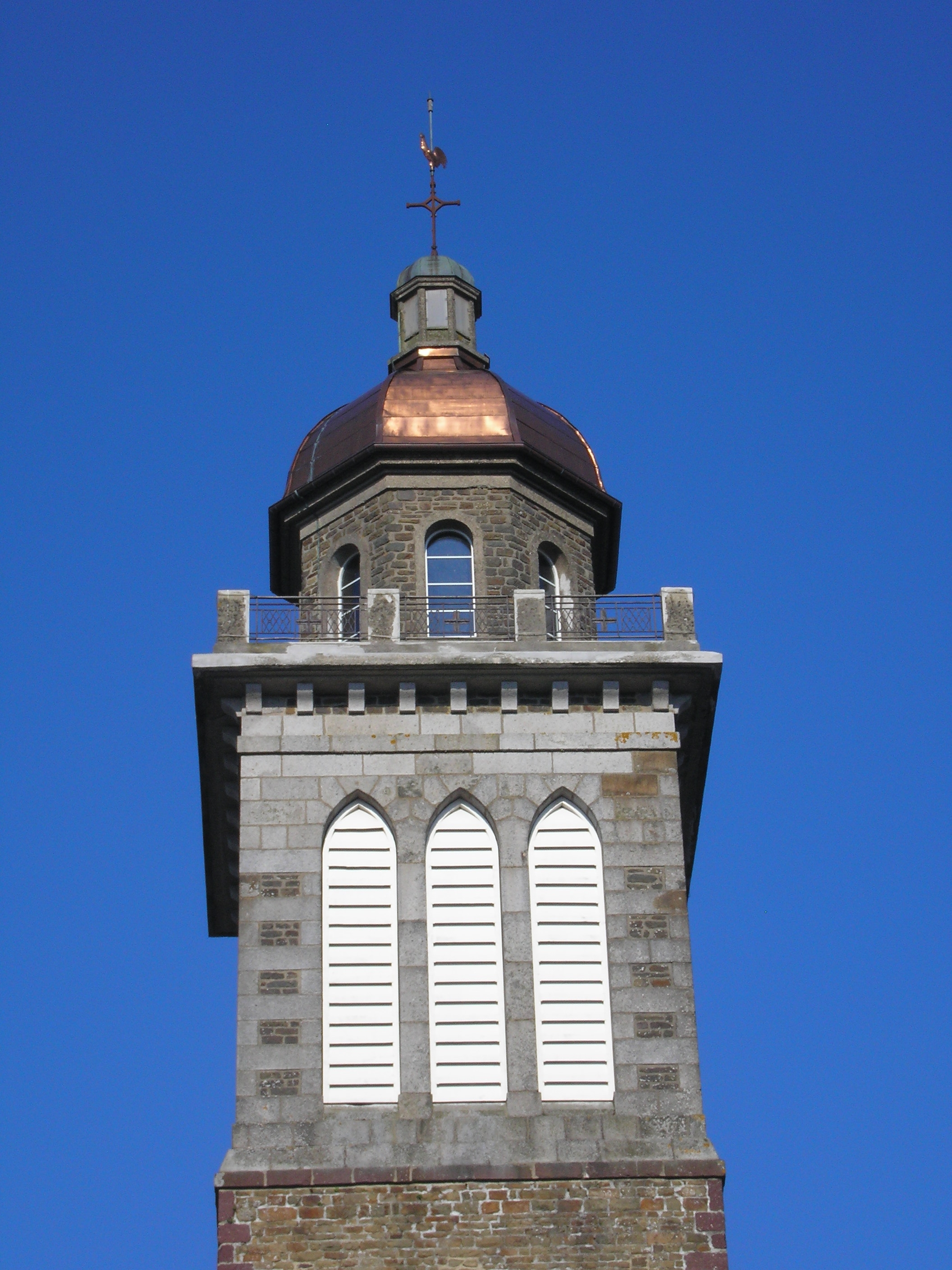
- Location of Saint-Amand
- Location within France Location within Normandy
- Coordinates: 49°02′37″N 0°57′46″W
- Country: France
- Region: Normandy
- Department: Manche
- Arrondissement: Saint-Lô
- Canton: Condé-sur-Vire
- Commune: Saint-Amand-Villages
- Area^{1}: 29.2 km^{2} (11.3 sq mi)
- Elevation: 126 m (413 ft)
- Highest elevation: 218 m (715 ft)
- Lowest elevation: 43 m (141 ft)
- Population (2022): 2,311
  - Density: 79.1/km^{2} (205/sq mi)
- Time zone: UTC+01:00 (CET)
  - Summer (DST): UTC+02:00 (CEST)
- Postal code: 50160
- ^{1} French Land Register data, which excludes lakes, ponds, glaciers > 1 km^{2} (0.386 sq mi or 247 acres) and river estuaries.

Saint-Amand (French pronunciation: [sɛ̃.t‿amɑ̃]) is a former commune in the Manche department in Normandy in north-western France. On 1 January 2017, it was merged into the new commune Saint-Amand-Villages. It has 2,311 inhabitants (2022).

== Heraldry ==
Arms of Saint-Amand	The arms of Saint-Amand are blazoned : Lozengy argent and gules. These arms are borrowed from the Grimaldi family (of Goyon-Matignon, extinct, former counts of Torigni), former lords of Saint-Amand.

== See also ==
- Communes of the Manche department
