= Fervaches =

- Part of Tessy-Bocage
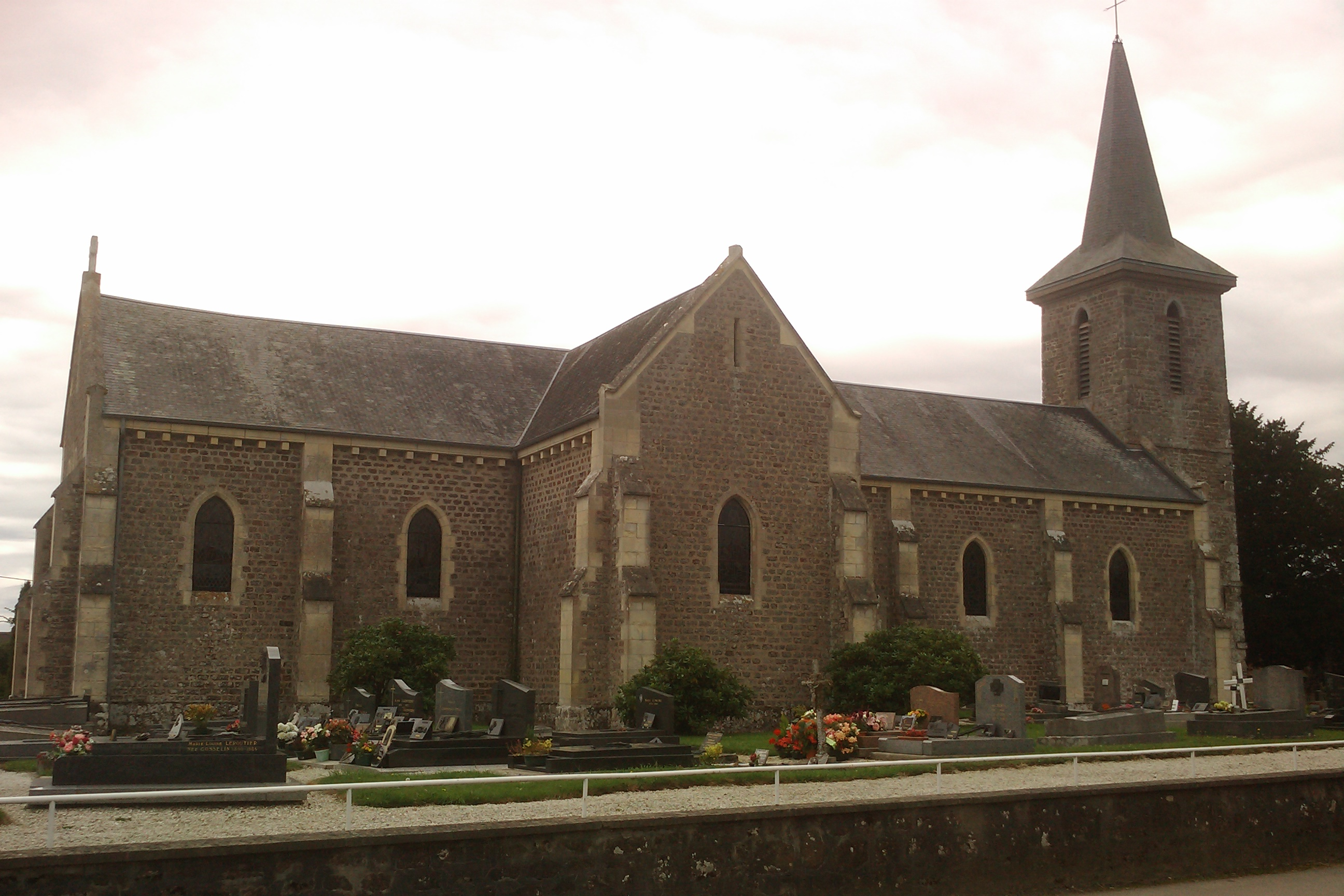
- The church of Saint-Pierre-ès-Liens
- Location of Fervaches
- Location within France Location within Normandy
- Coordinates: 48°59′44″N 1°05′04″W
- Country: France
- Region: Normandy
- Department: Manche
- Arrondissement: Saint-Lô
- Canton: Condé-sur-Vire
- Commune: Tessy-Bocage
- Area^{1}: 4.89 km^{2} (1.89 sq mi)
- Elevation: 88 m (289 ft)
- Highest elevation: 119 m (390 ft)
- Lowest elevation: 31 m (102 ft)
- Population (2018): 348
  - Density: 71.2/km^{2} (184/sq mi)
- Demonym: Fervachais
- Time zone: UTC+01:00 (CET)
  - Summer (DST): UTC+02:00 (CEST)
- Postal code: 50420
- ^{1} French Land Register data, which excludes lakes, ponds, glaciers > 1 km^{2} (0.386 sq mi or 247 acres) and river estuaries.

Fervaches (French pronunciation: [fɛʁvaʃ]) is a former commune in the Manche department in north-western France. On 1 January 2016, it was merged into the new commune of Tessy-Bocage.

== See also ==
- Communes of the Manche department
