= D52 =

D52 or D52 road may refer to:

roads:

- D52 road (Croatia), a road connecting Otočac and Korenica
- D52 road (Calvados), a road connecting Pont-Farcy and Vire, France
- D52 road (Drôme), a road near Geyssans, France
- D52 road (Nord), an ancient Roman road connecting Cassel to the sea
- D52 motorway (Czech Republic)
- Idli Kadai, working title D52, a 2025 Indian film by Dhanush

other:

- HMS Enterprise (D52), a 1918 Emerald-class light cruiser of the British Royal Navy
- INS Rana (D52), a 1982 Rajput class destroyer of the Indian Navy
- JNR Class D52, a class of Japanese steam locomotive
- Folate deficiency's ICD-10 code
- The FAA location identifier of Geneseo Airport in Geneseo, New York
