= Le Mesnil-Opac =

- Part of Moyon Villages
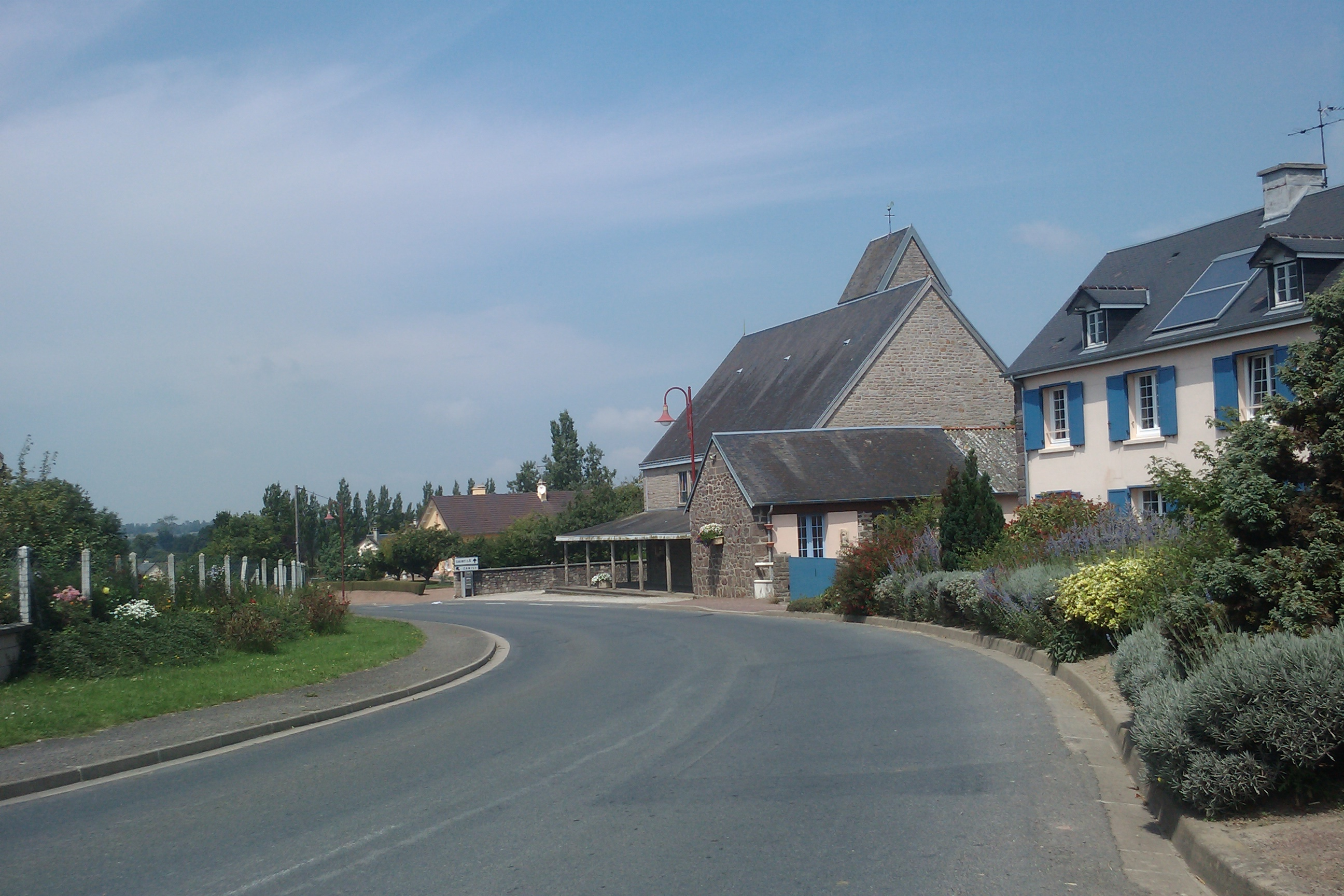
- The village and its Reconstruction church
- Location of Le Mesnil-Opac
- Location within France Location within Normandy
- Coordinates: 49°00′49″N 1°05′47″W
- Country: France
- Region: Normandy
- Department: Manche
- Arrondissement: Saint-Lô
- Canton: Condé-sur-Vire
- Commune: Moyon Villages
- Area^{1}: 5.58 km^{2} (2.15 sq mi)
- Highest elevation: 161 m (528 ft)
- Lowest elevation: 65 m (213 ft)
- Population (2022): 271
  - Density: 48.6/km^{2} (126/sq mi)
- Demonym: Opaciens
- Time zone: UTC+01:00 (CET)
  - Summer (DST): UTC+02:00 (CEST)
- Postal code: 50860
- ^{1} French Land Register data, which excludes lakes, ponds, glaciers > 1 km^{2} (0.386 sq mi or 247 acres) and river estuaries.

Le Mesnil-Opac (French pronunciation: [lə mɛnil ɔpak]) is a former commune in the Manche department in Normandy in north-western France. On 1 January 2016, it was merged with the new commune of Moyon Villages.

== See also ==
- Communes of the Manche department
