= Chevry =

Chevry may refer to the following locations in France:

- Chevry, Ain, in the Ain département
- Chevry, Manche, in the Manche département
- Chevry-Cossigny, in the Seine-et-Marne département
- Chevry-en-Sereine, in the Seine-et-Marne département
- Chevry-sous-le-Bignon, in the Loiret département
- Chevry, a section of Gif-sur-Yvette, in the Essonne département
