= Raoult =

Raoult may refer to:

- Raoult's law on vapor-liquid equilibrium
- People:
  - Annie Raoult (born 1951), French mathematician
  - Didier Raoult, French biologist, who identified Mimivirus
  - Éric Raoult, French politician
  - François-Marie Raoult (1830–1901), French chemist after whom Raoult's law is named
- Places:
  - Le Mesnil-Raoult, town in north-western France
  - Manneville-la-Raoult, town in northern France
