= Tessy-Bocage =

- Commune
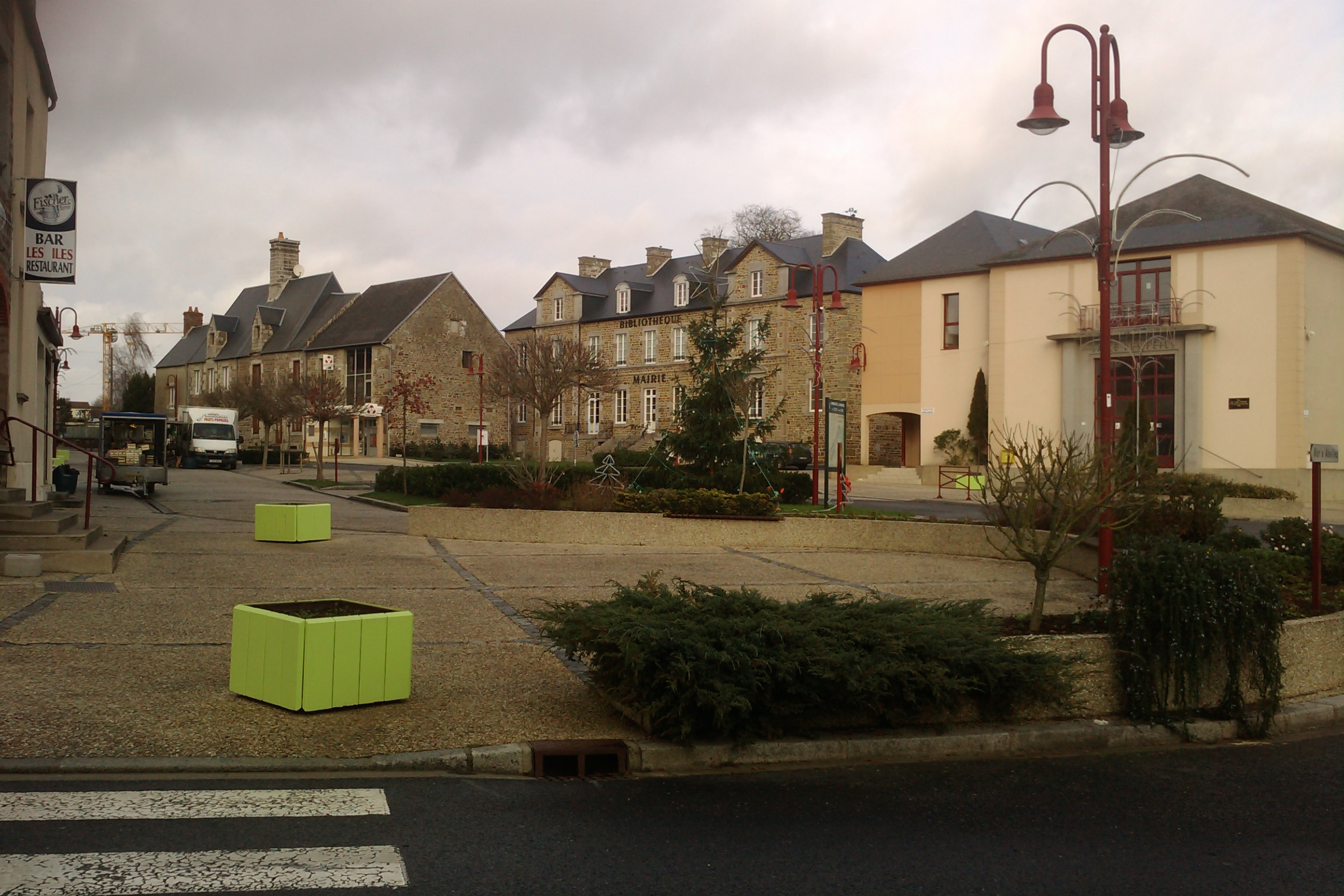
- The market square in Tessy-sur-Vire
- Location of Tessy-Bocage
- Location within France Location within Normandy
- Coordinates: 48°58′23″N 1°03′36″W
- Country: France
- Region: Normandy
- Department: Manche
- Arrondissement: Saint-Lô
- Canton: Condé-sur-Vire
- Intercommunality: Saint-Lô Agglo

Government
  - Mayor (2020–2026): Michel Richard
- Area^{1}: 34.24 km^{2} (13.22 sq mi)
- Population (2023): 2,217
  - Density: 64.75/km^{2} (167.7/sq mi)
- Time zone: UTC+01:00 (CET)
  - Summer (DST): UTC+02:00 (CEST)
- INSEE/Postal code: 50592 /50420
- ^{1} French Land Register data, which excludes lakes, ponds, glaciers > 1 km^{2} (0.386 sq mi or 247 acres) and river estuaries.

Tessy-Bocage (French pronunciation: [tɛsi bɔkaʒ]) is a commune in the department of Manche, northwestern France. The municipality was established on 1 January 2016 by merger of the former communes of Fervaches and Tessy-sur-Vire (the seat). On 1 January 2018, the former commune of Pont-Farcy (part of the department of Calvados before 2018) was merged into it.

== Population ==
Population data refer to the area corresponding with the commune as of January 2025.

Historical population
Year	Pop.	±% p.a.
1968	2,502	—
1975	2,336	−0.98%
1982	2,246	−0.56%
1990	2,142	−0.59%
1999	2,224	+0.42%
2007	2,371	+0.80%
2012	2,369	−0.02%
2017	2,357	−0.10%
2023	2,217	−1.02%
Source: INSEE

== See also ==
- Communes of the Manche department
