= Montrabot =

- Commune
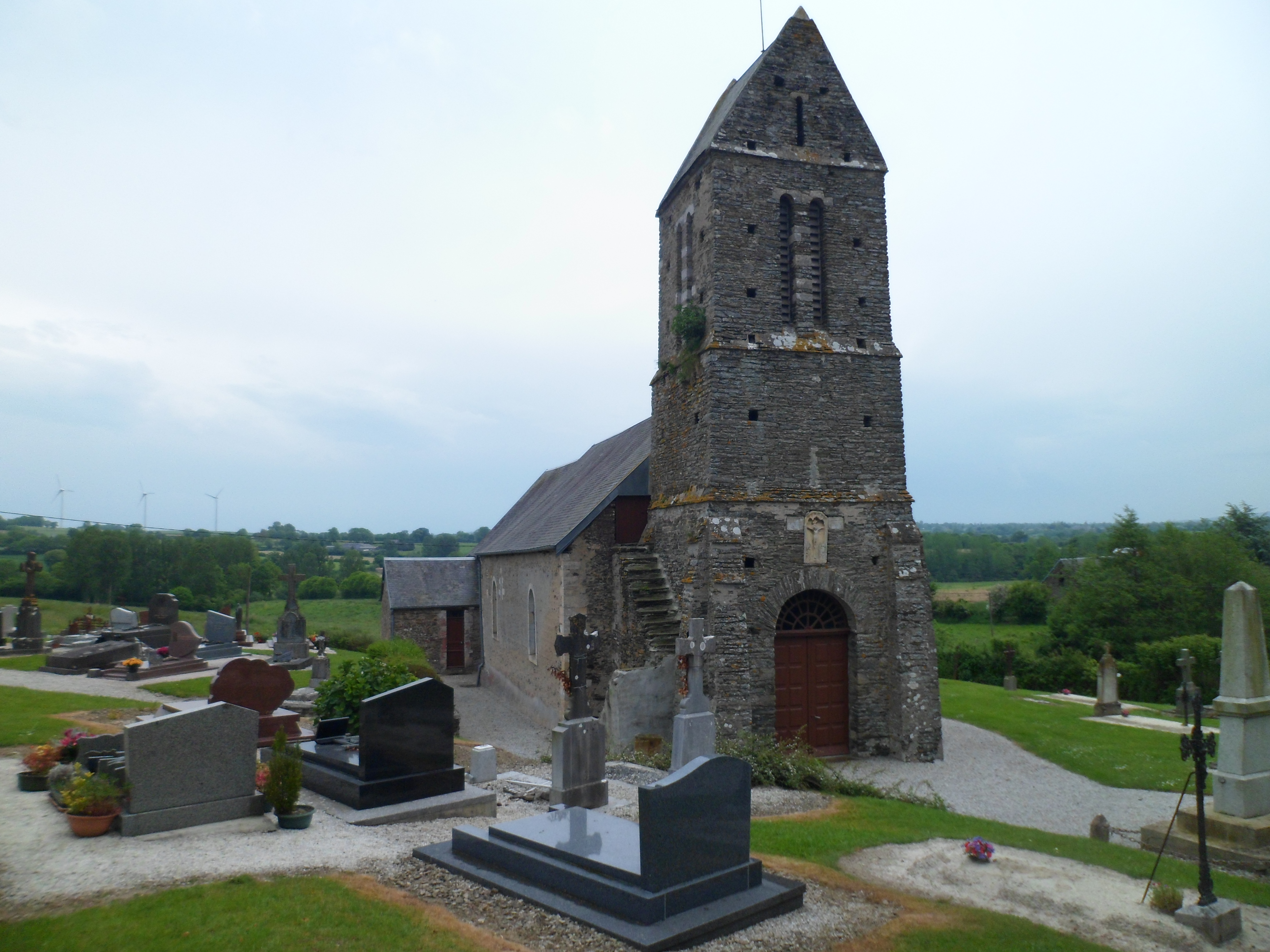
- The church of Saint-Martin
- Location of Montrabot
- Location within France Location within Normandy
- Coordinates: 49°06′33″N 0°53′23″W
- Country: France
- Region: Normandy
- Department: Manche
- Arrondissement: Saint-Lô
- Canton: Condé-sur-Vire
- Intercommunality: Saint-Lô Agglo

Government
  - Mayor (2020–2026): Jean-Pierre Marie
- Area^{1}: 3.86 km^{2} (1.49 sq mi)
- Elevation: 100 m (330 ft)
- Highest elevation: 191 m (627 ft)
- Lowest elevation: 77 m (253 ft)
- Population (2023): 70
  - Density: 18/km^{2} (47/sq mi)
- Demonym: Montrabotains
- Time zone: UTC+01:00 (CET)
  - Summer (DST): UTC+02:00 (CEST)
- INSEE/Postal code: 50351 /50810
- ^{1} French Land Register data, which excludes lakes, ponds, glaciers > 1 km^{2} (0.386 sq mi or 247 acres) and river estuaries.

Montrabot is a commune in the Manche department in Normandy in north-western France.

== See also ==
- Communes of the Manche department
