= Condé-sur-Vire =

Conde-sur-Vire
- Commune
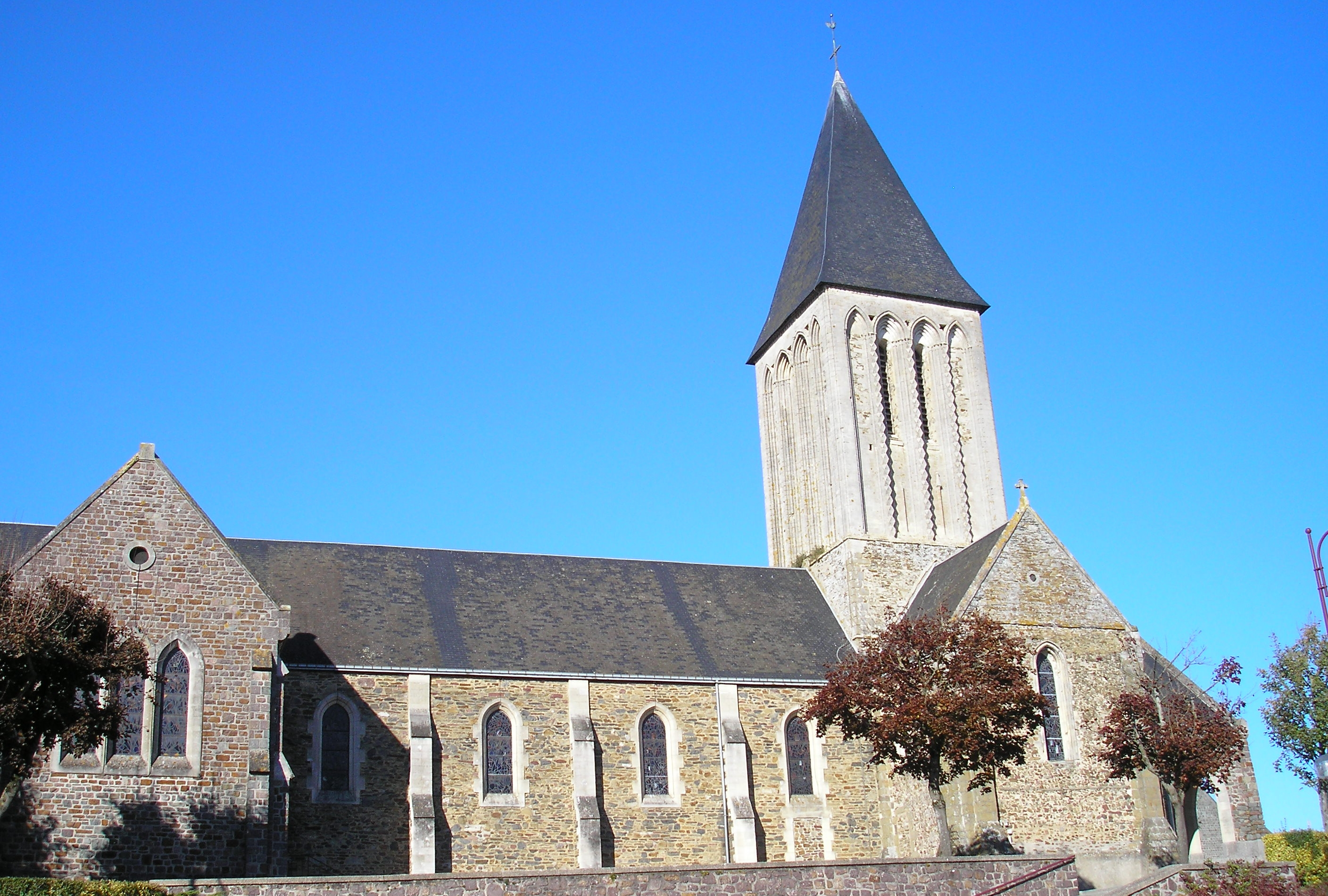
- The church in Condé-sur-Vire
- Location of Conde-sur-Vire
- Location within France Location within Normandy
- Coordinates: 49°03′11″N 1°02′09″W
- Country: France
- Region: Normandy
- Department: Manche
- Arrondissement: Saint-Lô
- Canton: Condé-sur-Vire
- Intercommunality: Saint-Lô Agglo

Government
  - Mayor (2020–2026): Laurent Pien
- Area^{1}: 36.36 km^{2} (14.04 sq mi)
- Elevation: 28 m (92 ft)
- Highest elevation: 153 m (502 ft)
- Lowest elevation: 17 m (56 ft)
- Population (2023): 4,137
  - Density: 113.8/km^{2} (294.7/sq mi)
- Demonym: Condéens
- Time zone: UTC+01:00 (CET)
  - Summer (DST): UTC+02:00 (CEST)
- INSEE/Postal code: 50139 /50890
- Website: www.conde-sur-vire.com
- ^{1} French Land Register data, which excludes lakes, ponds, glaciers > 1 km^{2} (0.386 sq mi or 247 acres) and river estuaries.

Condé-sur-Vire (French pronunciation: [kɔ̃de syʁ viʁ], literally Condé on Vire) is a commune in the Manche department in Normandy in north-western France. On 1 January 2016, the former commune of Le Mesnil-Raoult was merged into Condé-sur-Vire. On 1 January 2017, the former commune of Troisgots was merged into Condé-sur-Vire.

== Geography ==
=== Climate ===
Condé-sur-Vire has an oceanic climate (Köppen climate classification Cfb). The average annual temperature in Condé-sur-Vire is 11.1 °C (52.0 °F). The average annual rainfall is 937.5 mm (36.91 in) with December as the wettest month. The temperatures are highest on average in July, at around 17.8 °C (64.0 °F), and lowest in January, at around 5.4 °C (41.7 °F). The highest temperature ever recorded in Condé-sur-Vire was 38.3 °C (100.9 °F) on 5 August 2003; the coldest temperature ever recorded was −19.0 °C (−2.2 °F) on 17 January 1985.

Climate data for Condé-sur-Vire (1981–2010 averages, extremes 1968−present)
Month	Jan	Feb	Mar	Apr	May	Jun	Jul	Aug	Sep	Oct	Nov	Dec	Year
Record high °C (°F)	16.6 (61.9)	21.8 (71.2)	24.8 (76.6)	27.0 (80.6)	30.9 (87.6)	36.3 (97.3)	37.0 (98.6)	38.3 (100.9)	32.8 (91.0)	28.6 (83.5)	20.6 (69.1)	17.1 (62.8)	38.3 (100.9)
Mean daily maximum °C (°F)	8.7 (47.7)	9.4 (48.9)	12.3 (54.1)	14.7 (58.5)	18.4 (65.1)	21.2 (70.2)	23.5 (74.3)	23.5 (74.3)	20.7 (69.3)	16.6 (61.9)	12.1 (53.8)	8.9 (48.0)	15.9 (60.6)
Daily mean °C (°F)	5.4 (41.7)	5.5 (41.9)	7.8 (46.0)	9.4 (48.9)	13.0 (55.4)	15.7 (60.3)	17.8 (64.0)	17.7 (63.9)	15.1 (59.2)	12.0 (53.6)	8.2 (46.8)	5.6 (42.1)	11.1 (52.0)
Mean daily minimum °C (°F)	2.0 (35.6)	1.6 (34.9)	3.3 (37.9)	4.2 (39.6)	7.6 (45.7)	10.1 (50.2)	12.1 (53.8)	11.9 (53.4)	9.5 (49.1)	7.5 (45.5)	4.3 (39.7)	2.3 (36.1)	6.4 (43.5)
Record low °C (°F)	−19.0 (−2.2)	−12.8 (9.0)	−10.5 (13.1)	−5.5 (22.1)	−3.0 (26.6)	0.0 (32.0)	2.9 (37.2)	2.1 (35.8)	−1.0 (30.2)	−6.2 (20.8)	−8.9 (16.0)	−11.8 (10.8)	−19.0 (−2.2)
Average precipitation mm (inches)	98.2 (3.87)	71.3 (2.81)	75.9 (2.99)	63.7 (2.51)	69.7 (2.74)	61.0 (2.40)	56.2 (2.21)	59.4 (2.34)	73.3 (2.89)	99.0 (3.90)	97.8 (3.85)	112.0 (4.41)	937.5 (36.91)
Average precipitation days (≥ 1.0 mm)	15.1	12.2	12.6	11.4	10.8	8.7	9.8	9.0	10.6	13.8	14.8	15.2	143.9
Source: Meteociel

== Population ==
Population data refer to the area corresponding with the commune as of January 2025.

Historical population
Year	Pop.	±% p.a.
1968	3,277	—
1975	3,652	+1.56%
1982	3,718	+0.26%
1990	3,631	−0.30%
1999	3,606	−0.08%
2007	3,861	+0.86%
2012	4,060	+1.01%
2017	4,027	−0.16%
2023	4,137	+0.45%
Source: INSEE

== Heraldry ==
Arms of Condé-sur-Vire	The arms of Condé-sur-Vire are blazoned : Vert, a bend wavy (river) between an enraged bull and a milk-can argent.

== People ==
Among well known people born here is Father Jean de Brébeuf, a martyr and since 1930 a Catholic saint.

== Sport ==
Condé-sur-Vire has a football club who play at the tade Henri Binet, Condé Sports.

== Twinning ==
In the late 1970s, arrangements were made for the twinning of Condé-sur-Vire with Bordon in Hampshire. For several years, parties of civic leaders and school teachers would arrive in Bordon, accompanying 70 or more school children for a week of activities.

== See also ==
- Communes of the Manche department
