= Tessy-sur-Vire =

- Part of Tessy-Bocage
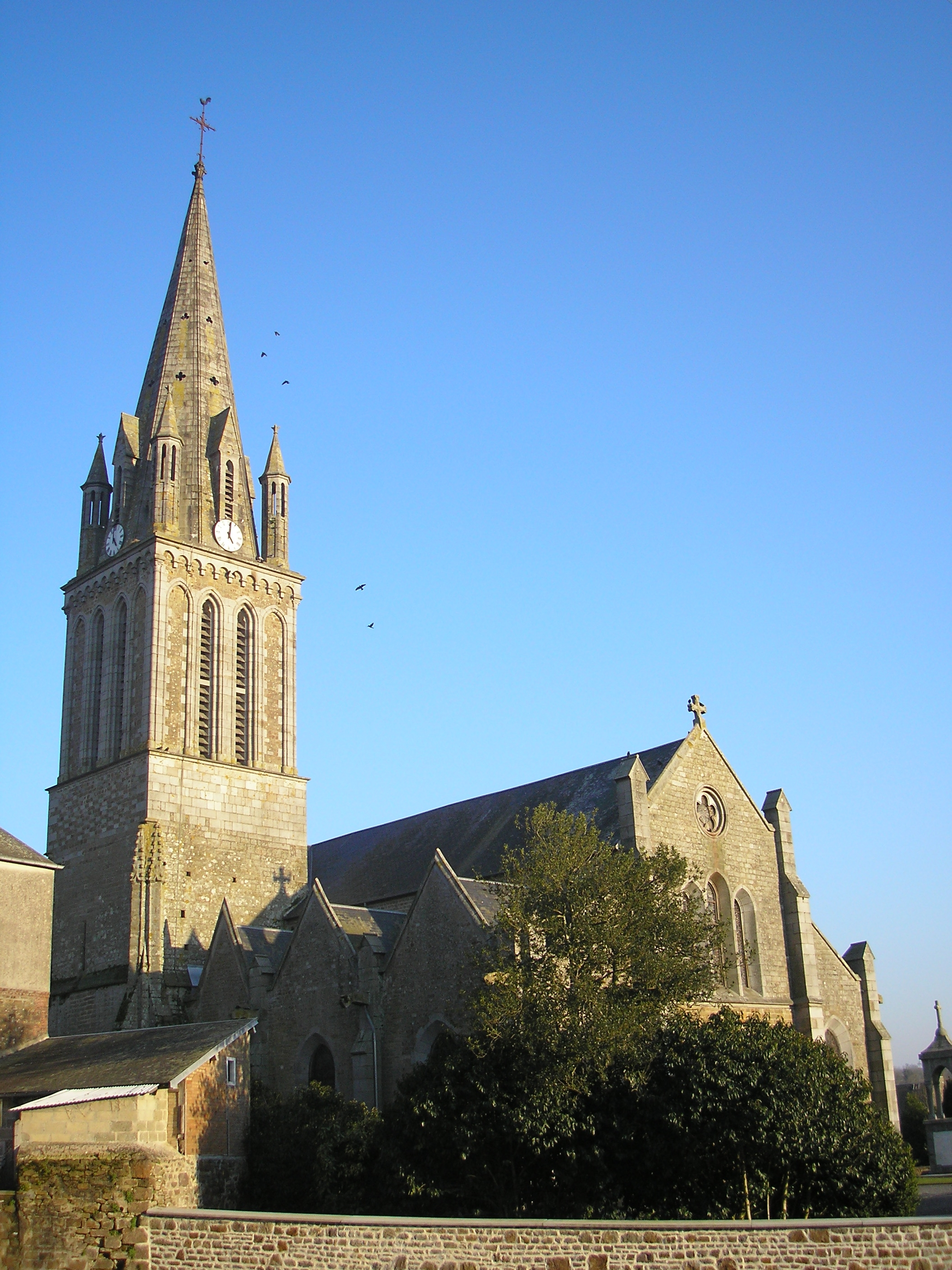
- L'église Saint-Pierre
- Location of Tessy-sur-Vire
- Location within France Location within Normandy
- Coordinates: 48°58′30″N 1°03′34″W
- Country: France
- Region: Normandy
- Department: Manche
- Arrondissement: Saint-Lô
- Canton: Condé-sur-Vire
- Commune: Tessy-Bocage
- Area^{1}: 15.90 km^{2} (6.14 sq mi)
- Elevation: 50 m (160 ft)
- Highest elevation: 210 m (690 ft)
- Lowest elevation: 34 m (112 ft)
- Population (2018): 1,425
  - Density: 89.62/km^{2} (232.1/sq mi)
- Demonym: Tessyais
- Time zone: UTC+01:00 (CET)
  - Summer (DST): UTC+02:00 (CEST)
- Postal code: 50420
- ^{1} French Land Register data, which excludes lakes, ponds, glaciers > 1 km^{2} (0.386 sq mi or 247 acres) and river estuaries.

Tessy-sur-Vire (French pronunciation: [tɛsi syʁ viʁ], literally Tessy on Vire) is a former commune in the Manche department in Normandy in north-western France. On 1 January 2016, it was merged into the new commune of Tessy-Bocage.

== Heraldry ==
Arms of Tessy-sur-Vire	The arms of Tessy-sur-Vire are blazoned : Gules, a 3-arched bridge argent masoned sable issuant from a base engrailed azure (waves).

== See also ==
- Communes of the Manche department
