= Hector Corfiato =

Greek architect and professor (1892–1963)

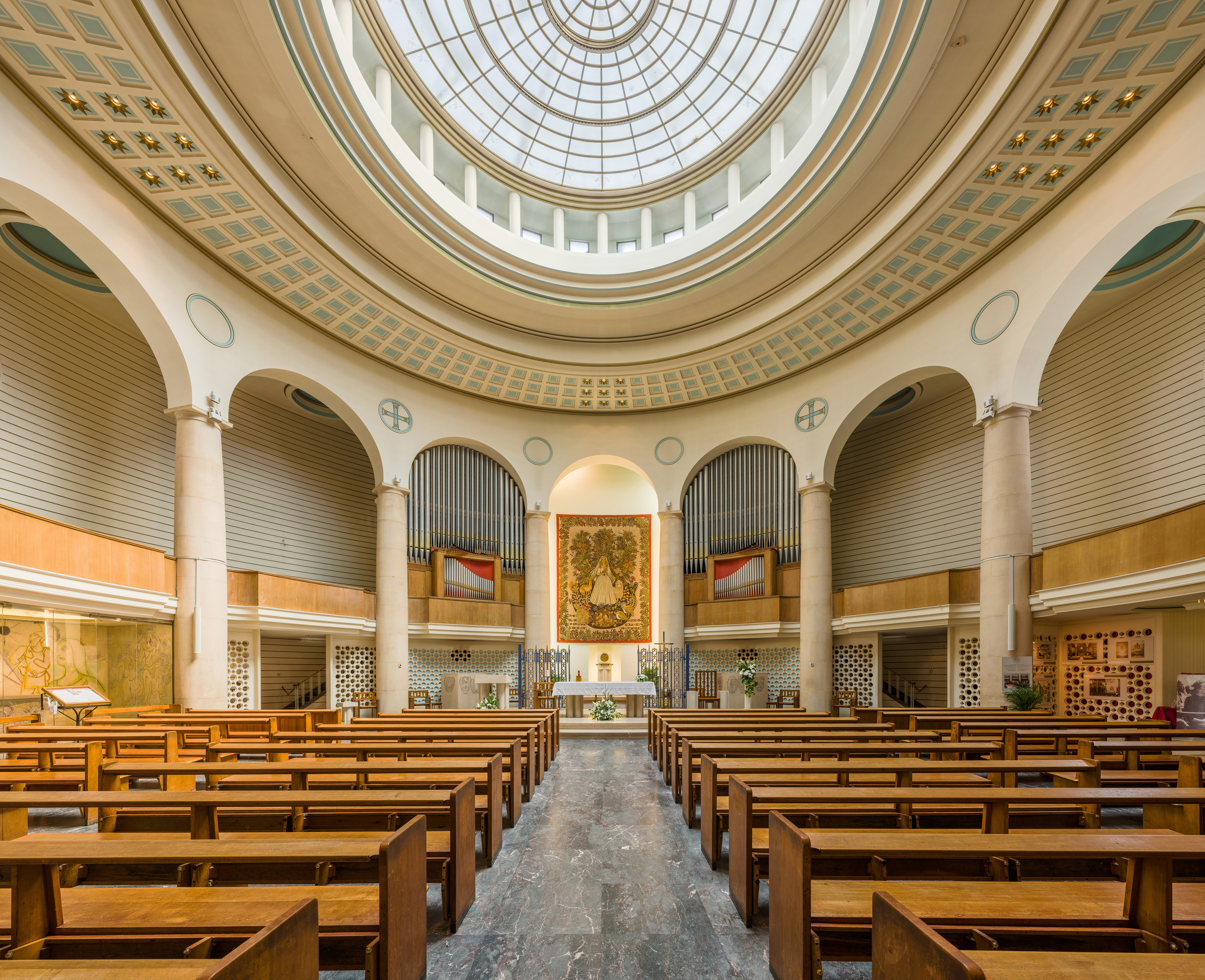
Notre Dame de France interior

Hector Othon Corfiato (1892 – 3 May 1963) was a Greek architect. He was professor of architecture and director, at The Bartlett School of Architecture, University College London from 1946 to 1959, and professor emeritus from 1960.

Corfiato graduated from the École nationale supérieure des Beaux-Arts in Paris, and established the firm of Corfiato, Thomson & Partners.

From 1953 to 1955 he was the architect responsible for rebuilding Notre Dame de France, a French Catholic church on Leicester Place in London's Soho, which was grade II listed in 1998.

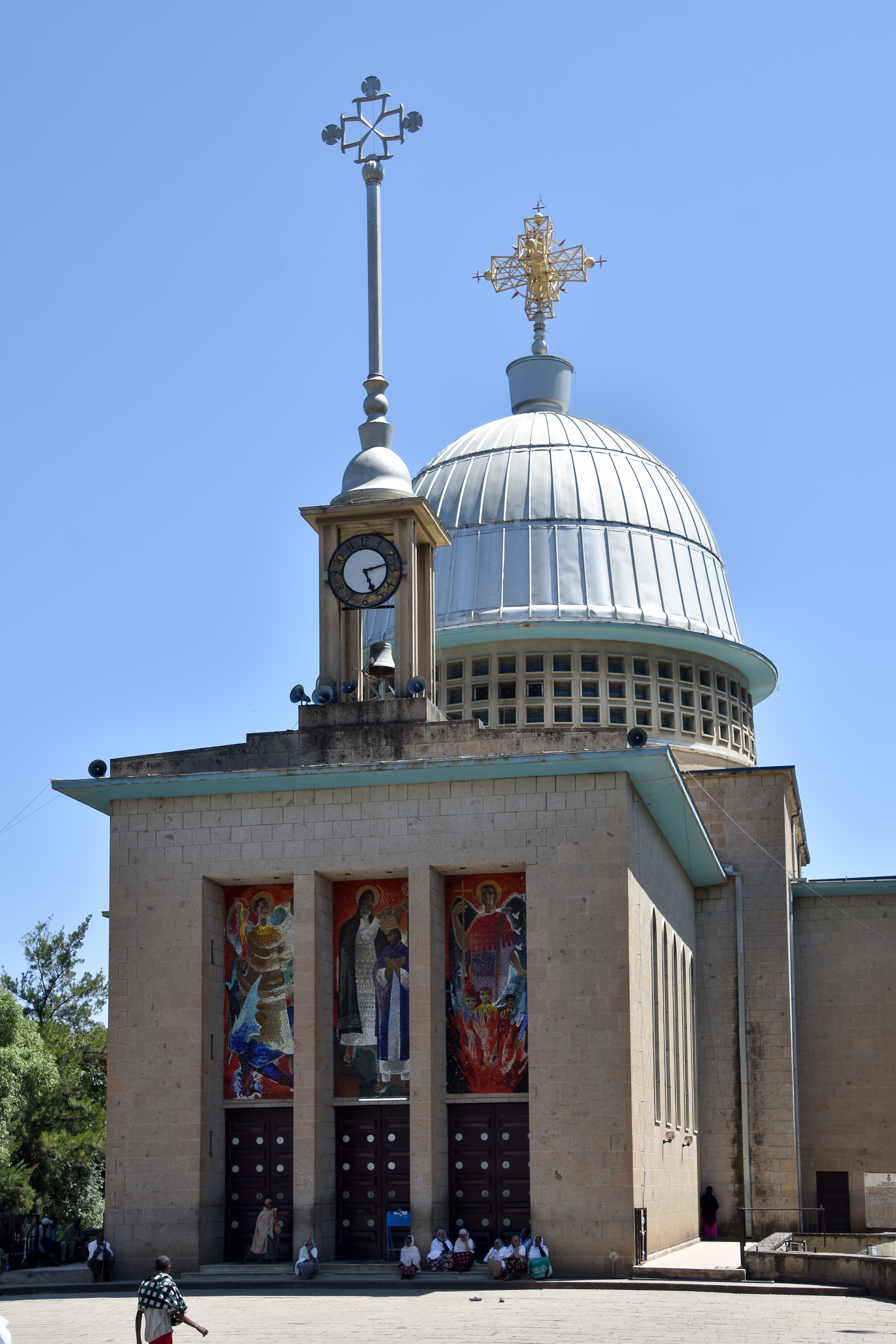
Church at Debre Libanos, Ethiopia (ca. 1961)

Another distinguished building of the same period is the chapel of the Roman Catholic Seminary for the Diocese of Westminster (Allen Hall) in Beaufort Street, London which was completed in 1958. In 1961, he designed the reconstructed church of Debre Libanos, Ethiopia.

His nationality is disputed, "Some alumni claim he was Greek, others Egyptian, while an Architects' Journal article describes him as a 'relatively unknown French architect'. "

In 1922, he was awarded the FRANCE SOCIETE DES ARCHITECTS prize medal, 50mm in bronze, it is named to HECTOR CORFIATOPULO. The medal was sold on eBay some years ago along with other later medals bearing the name CORFIATO.

The London Gazette of 6 January 1933, confirms that Hector Orthon Corfiatopulo, known as Hector Orthon Corfiato, a Greek architect of 121 Willifield Way, Golders Green, Middlesex, became a naturalised British subject on 21 December 1932. This would seem to confirm that Corfiato was a Greek architect, who became a British architect and that he was not a 'French architect'.

In 2006, his St William of York Roman Catholic church in Stanmore, designed in 1959, was grade II listed.
