= Chevry, Manche =

Chevry
- Part of Moyon Villages
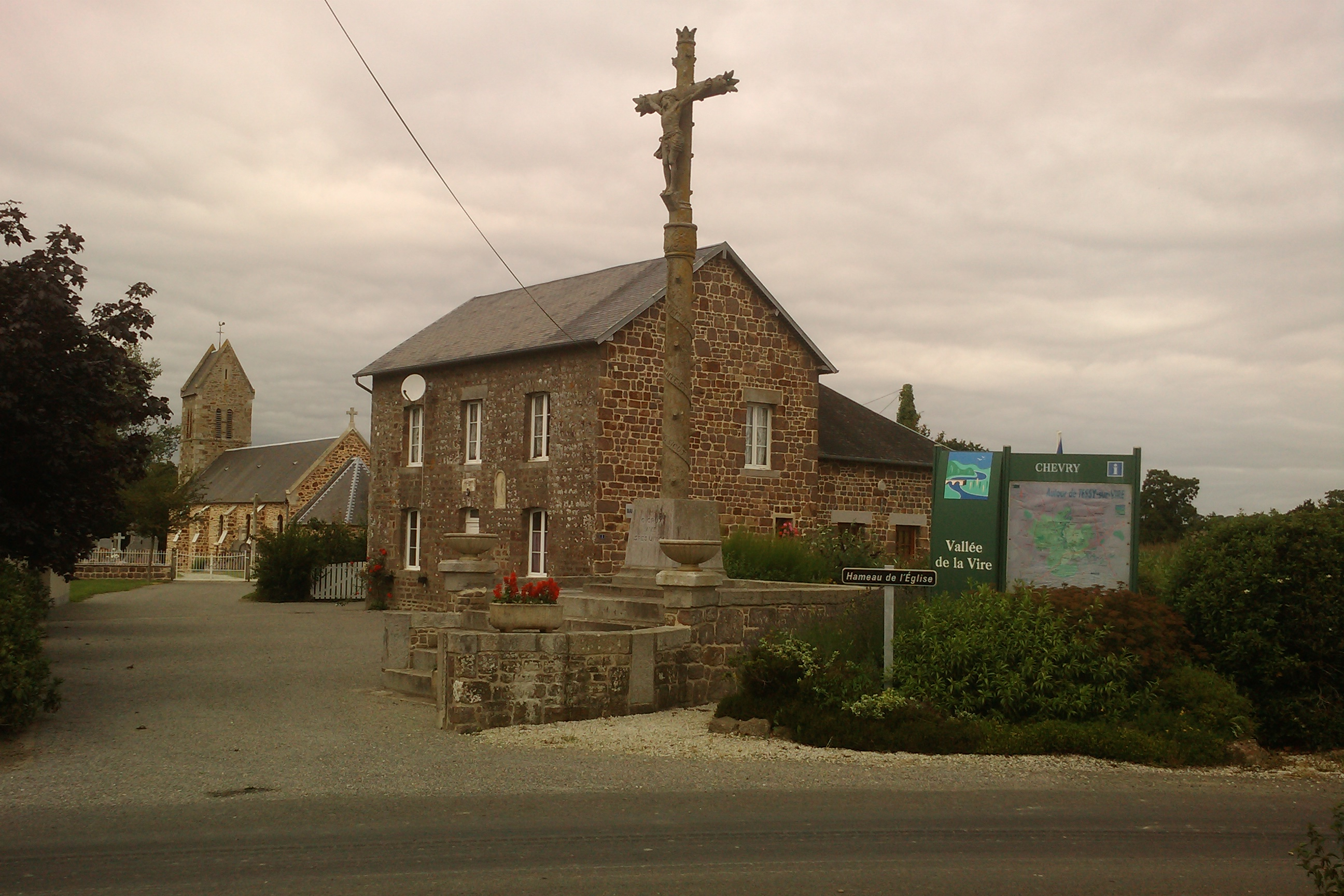
- Location of Chevry
- Location within France Location within Normandy
- Coordinates: 48°58′09″N 1°07′07″W
- Country: France
- Region: Normandy
- Department: Manche
- Arrondissement: Saint-Lô
- Canton: Condé-sur-Vire
- Commune: Moyon Villages
- Area^{1}: 3.62 km^{2} (1.40 sq mi)
- Highest elevation: 175 m (574 ft)
- Lowest elevation: 54 m (177 ft)
- Population (2022): 96
  - Density: 27/km^{2} (69/sq mi)
- Demonym: Chevryais
- Time zone: UTC+01:00 (CET)
  - Summer (DST): UTC+02:00 (CEST)
- Postal code: 50420
- ^{1} French Land Register data, which excludes lakes, ponds, glaciers > 1 km^{2} (0.386 sq mi or 247 acres) and river estuaries.

Chevry (French pronunciation: [ʃəvʁi]) is a former commune in the Manche department in Normandy in north-western France. On 1 January 2016, it was merged into the new commune of Moyon Villages.

== See also ==
- Communes of the Manche department
