= Moyon Villages =

- Commune
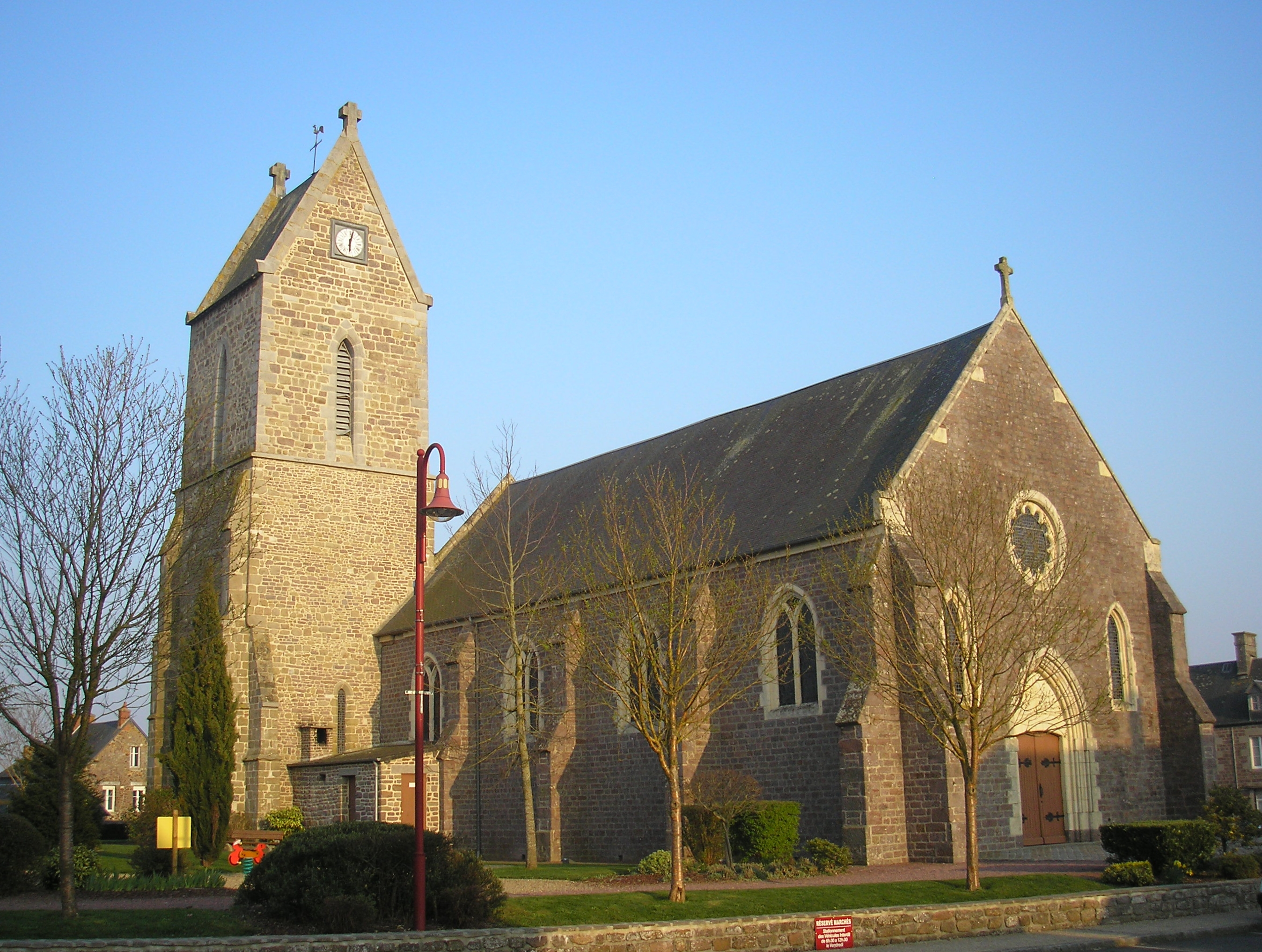
- The church in Moyon
- Location of Moyon Villages
- Location within France Location within Normandy
- Coordinates: 49°00′00″N 1°07′05″W
- Country: France
- Region: Normandy
- Department: Manche
- Arrondissement: Saint-Lô
- Canton: Condé-sur-Vire
- Intercommunality: Saint-Lô Agglo

Government
  - Mayor (2020–2026): Jean-Pierre Louise
- Area^{1}: 32.94 km^{2} (12.72 sq mi)
- Population (2023): 1,489
  - Density: 45.20/km^{2} (117.1/sq mi)
- Time zone: UTC+01:00 (CET)
  - Summer (DST): UTC+02:00 (CEST)
- INSEE/Postal code: 50363 /50860
- ^{1} French Land Register data, which excludes lakes, ponds, glaciers > 1 km^{2} (0.386 sq mi or 247 acres) and river estuaries.

Moyon Villages (French pronunciation: [mwajɔ̃ vilaʒ]) is a commune in the department of Manche, northwestern France. The municipality was established on 1 January 2016 by merger of the former communes of Chevry, Le Mesnil-Opac and Moyon (the seat).

== See also ==
- Communes of the Manche department
