= Fourneaux, Manche =

Fourneaux
- Commune
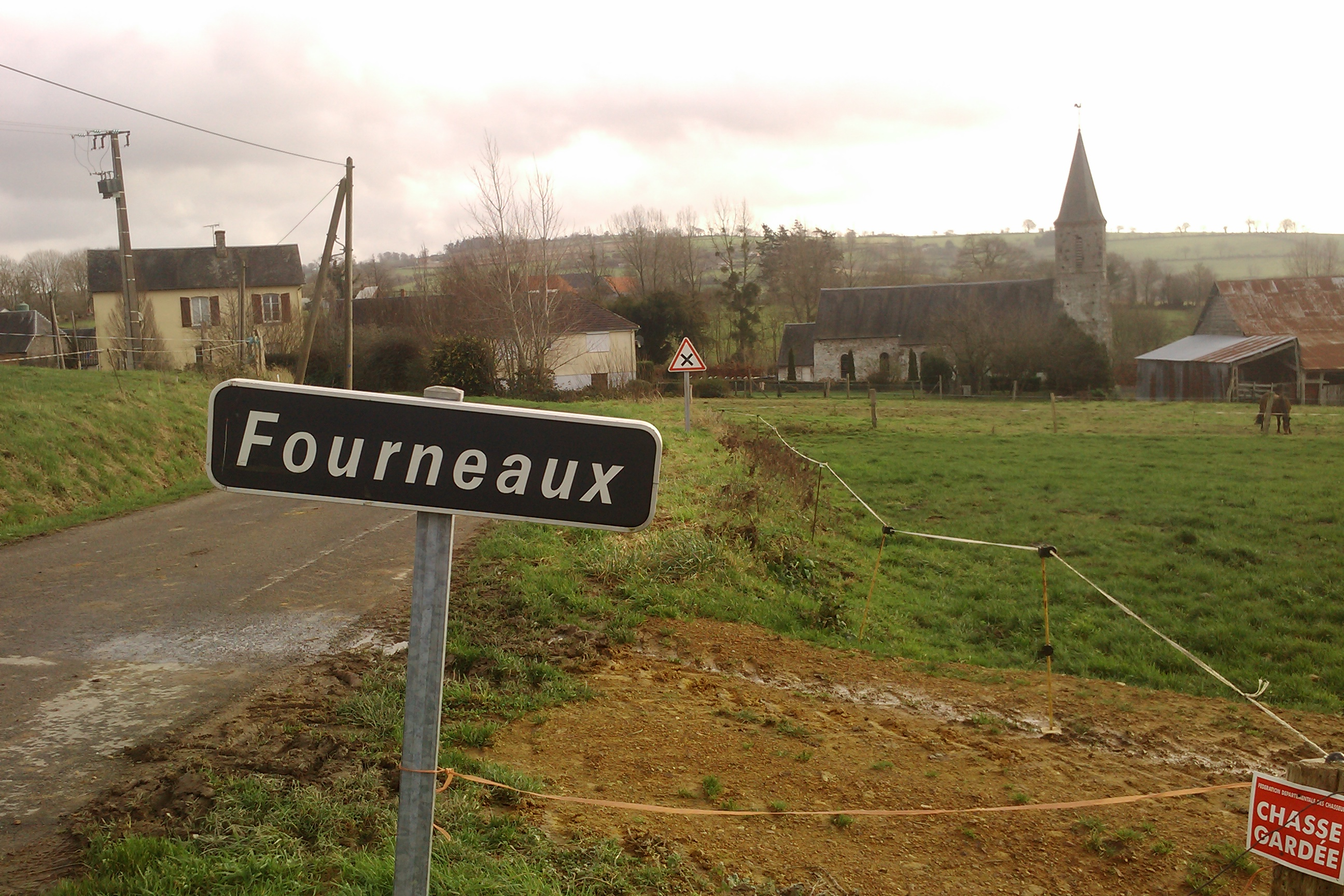
- The village
- Location of Fourneaux
- Location within France Location within Normandy
- Coordinates: 48°57′55″N 1°02′06″W
- Country: France
- Region: Normandy
- Department: Manche
- Arrondissement: Saint-Lô
- Canton: Condé-sur-Vire
- Intercommunality: Saint-Lô Agglo

Government
  - Mayor (2020–2026): Thierry Leharivel
- Area^{1}: 3.34 km^{2} (1.29 sq mi)
- Elevation: 100 m (330 ft)
- Highest elevation: 147 m (482 ft)
- Lowest elevation: 37 m (121 ft)
- Population (2023): 131
  - Density: 39.2/km^{2} (102/sq mi)
- Time zone: UTC+01:00 (CET)
  - Summer (DST): UTC+02:00 (CEST)
- INSEE/Postal code: 50192 /50420
- ^{1} French Land Register data, which excludes lakes, ponds, glaciers > 1 km^{2} (0.386 sq mi or 247 acres) and river estuaries.

Fourneaux (French pronunciation: [fuʁno]) is a commune in the Manche department in north-western France.

== See also ==
- Communes of the Manche department
