= Le Mesnil-Raoult =

- Part of Condé-sur-Vire
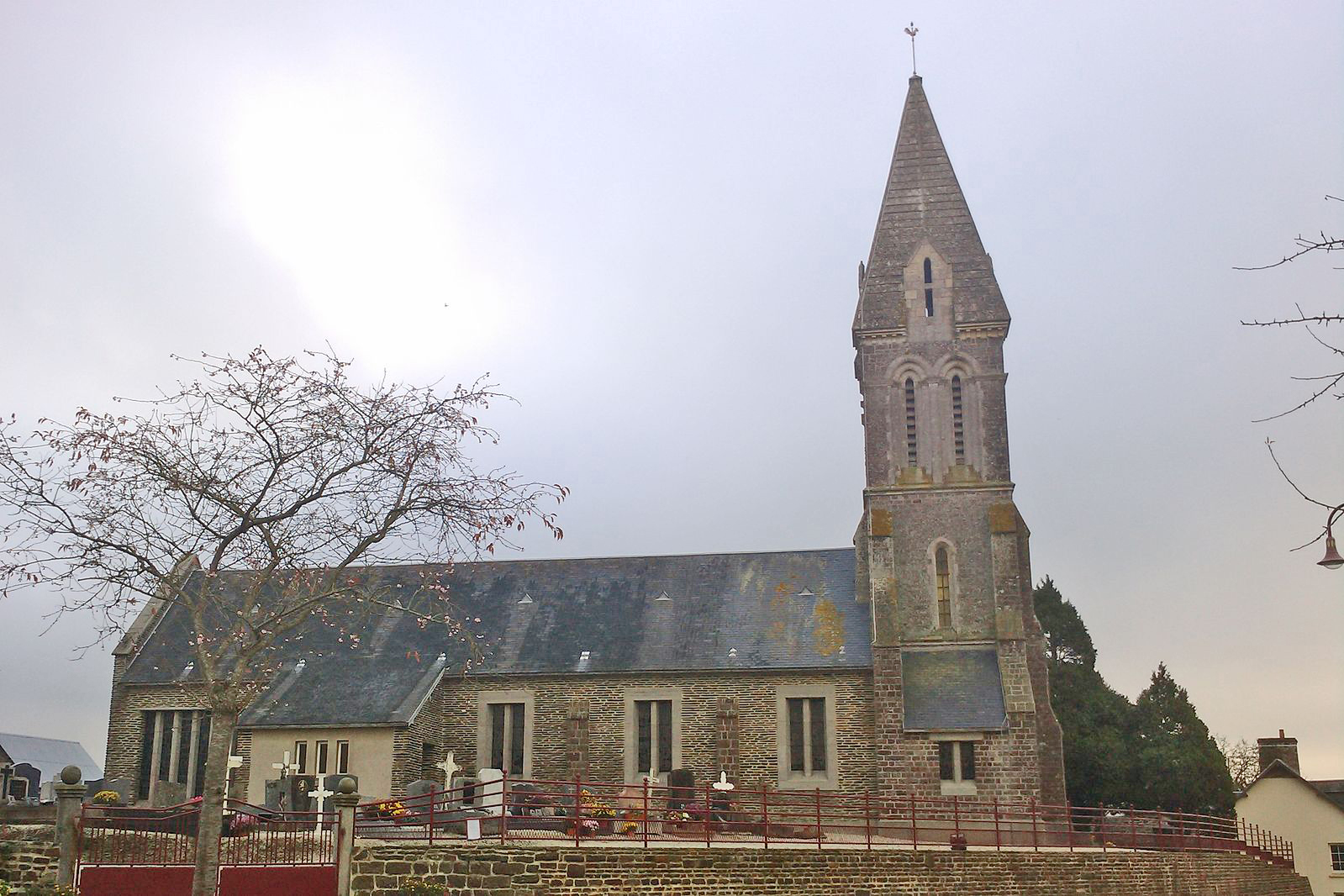
- The church of Notre-Dame
- Location of Le Mesnil-Raoult
- Location within France Location within Normandy
- Coordinates: 49°02′07″N 1°03′33″W
- Country: France
- Region: Normandy
- Department: Manche
- Arrondissement: Saint-Lô
- Canton: Condé-sur-Vire
- Commune: Condé-sur-Vire
- Area^{1}: 3.98 km^{2} (1.54 sq mi)
- Elevation: 85 m (279 ft)
- Highest elevation: 122 m (400 ft)
- Lowest elevation: 19 m (62 ft)
- Population (2018): 367
  - Density: 92.2/km^{2} (239/sq mi)
- Demonym: Mesnilrodins
- Time zone: UTC+01:00 (CET)
  - Summer (DST): UTC+02:00 (CEST)
- Postal code: 50420
- ^{1} French Land Register data, which excludes lakes, ponds, glaciers > 1 km^{2} (0.386 sq mi or 247 acres) and river estuaries.

Le Mesnil-Raoult (French pronunciation: [lə mɛni(l) ʁaul]) is a former commune in the Manche department in Normandy in north-western France. On 1 January 2016, it was merged into the commune of Condé-sur-Vire.

== See also ==
- Communes of the Manche department
