= Lambertville =

Lambertville may refer to the following places:

- Lambertville, California, former name of Freshwater, California
- Lambertville, Michigan
- Lambertville, New Jersey

== See also ==
- Lamberville (disambiguation)
