= Gouvets =

- Commune
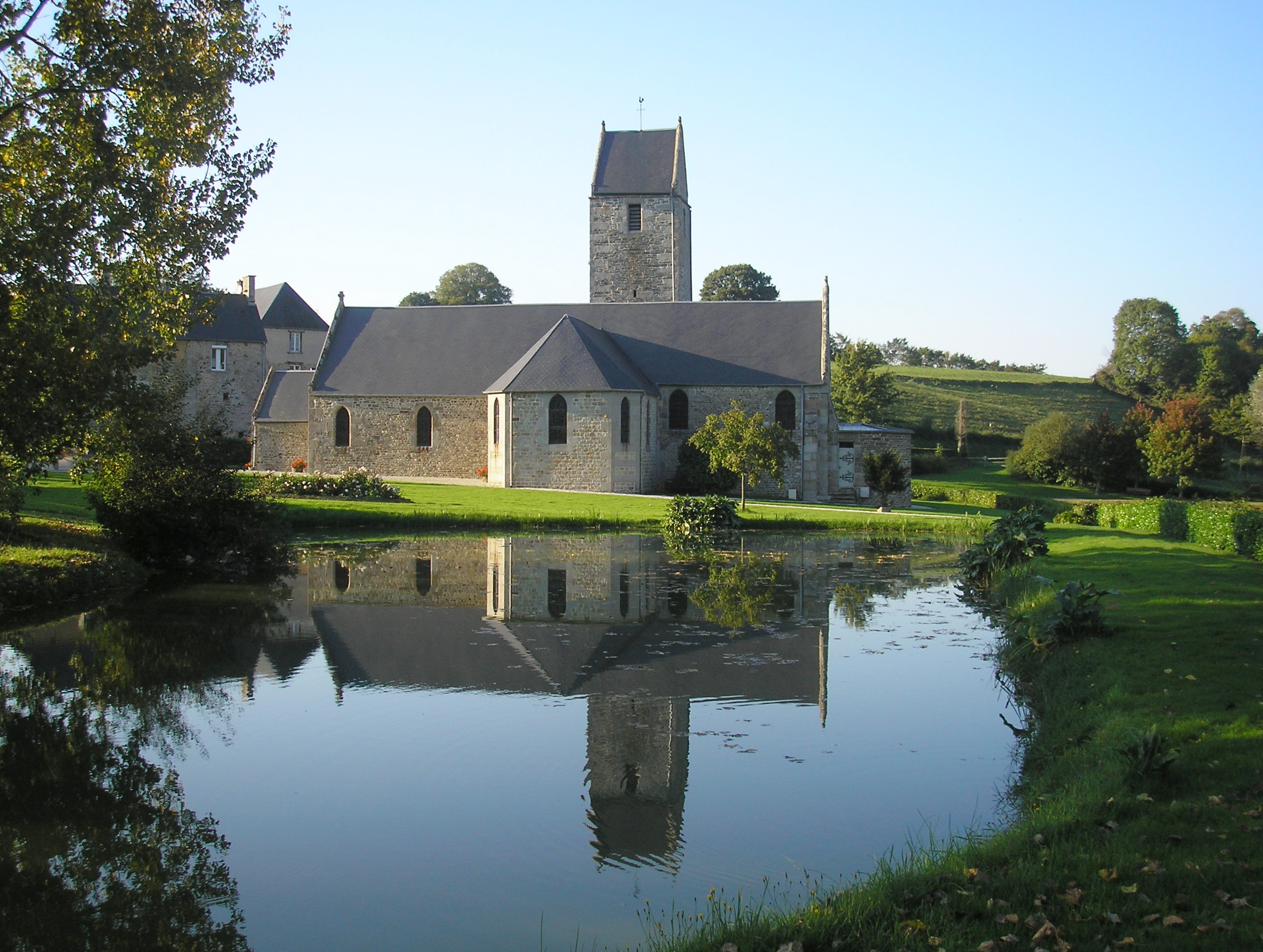
- The church of Sainte-Marthe
- Location of Gouvets
- Location within France Location within Normandy
- Coordinates: 48°56′00″N 1°05′42″W
- Country: France
- Region: Normandy
- Department: Manche
- Arrondissement: Saint-Lô
- Canton: Condé-sur-Vire
- Intercommunality: Saint-Lô Agglo

Government
  - Mayor (2020–2026): Rémy Deslandes
- Area^{1}: 11.01 km^{2} (4.25 sq mi)
- Elevation: 250 m (820 ft)
- Highest elevation: 277 m (909 ft)
- Lowest elevation: 74 m (243 ft)
- Population (2023): 295
  - Density: 26.8/km^{2} (69.4/sq mi)
- Demonym: Gouvions
- Time zone: UTC+01:00 (CET)
  - Summer (DST): UTC+02:00 (CEST)
- INSEE/Postal code: 50214 /50420
- ^{1} French Land Register data, which excludes lakes, ponds, glaciers > 1 km^{2} (0.386 sq mi or 247 acres) and river estuaries.

Gouvets (French pronunciation: [ɡuvɛ]) is a commune in the Manche department in north-western France.

== See also ==
- Communes of the Manche department
