= Biéville, Manche =

Biéville
- Commune
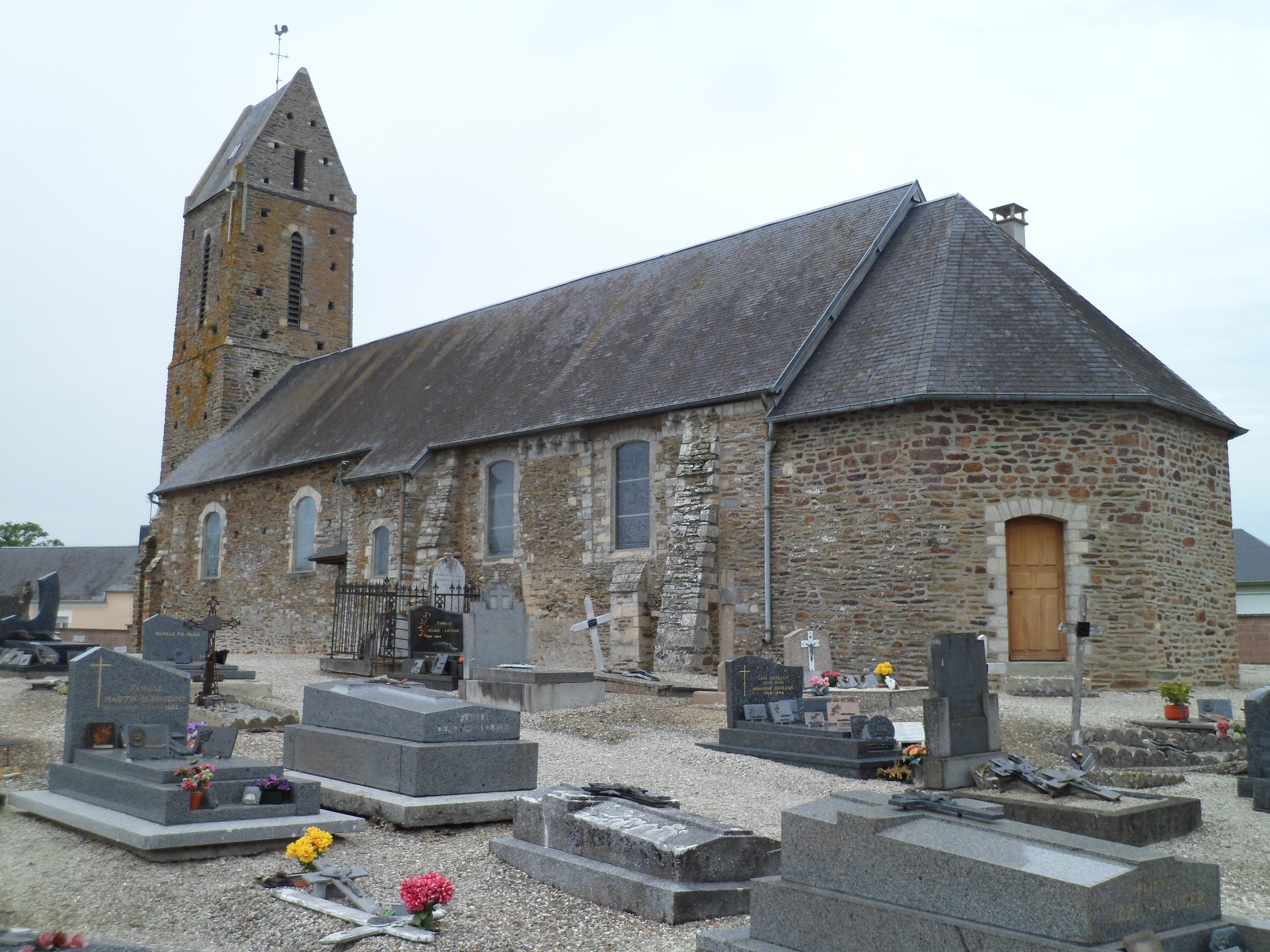
- The church of Saint-Pierre
- Location of Biéville
- Location within France Location within Normandy
- Coordinates: 49°04′56″N 0°53′14″W
- Country: France
- Region: Normandy
- Department: Manche
- Arrondissement: Saint-Lô
- Canton: Condé-sur-Vire
- Intercommunality: Saint-Lô Agglo

Government
  - Mayor (2020–2026): Philippe Briard
- Area^{1}: 5.56 km^{2} (2.15 sq mi)
- Highest elevation: 160 m (520 ft)
- Lowest elevation: 82 m (269 ft)
- Population (2023): 198
  - Density: 35.6/km^{2} (92.2/sq mi)
- Time zone: UTC+01:00 (CET)
  - Summer (DST): UTC+02:00 (CEST)
- INSEE/Postal code: 50054 /50160
- ^{1} French Land Register data, which excludes lakes, ponds, glaciers > 1 km^{2} (0.386 sq mi or 247 acres) and river estuaries.

Biéville (French pronunciation: [bjevil]) is a commune in the Manche department in the Normandy region in northwestern France.

== Population ==
Historical population
Year	Pop.	±% p.a.
1968	176	—
1975	159	−1.44%
1982	149	−0.92%
1990	145	−0.34%
1999	146	+0.08%
2007	165	+1.54%
2012	189	+2.75%
2017	189	+0.00%
2023	198	+0.78%
Source: INSEE

== See also ==
- Communes of the Manche department
