= Saint-Amand-Villages =

- Commune
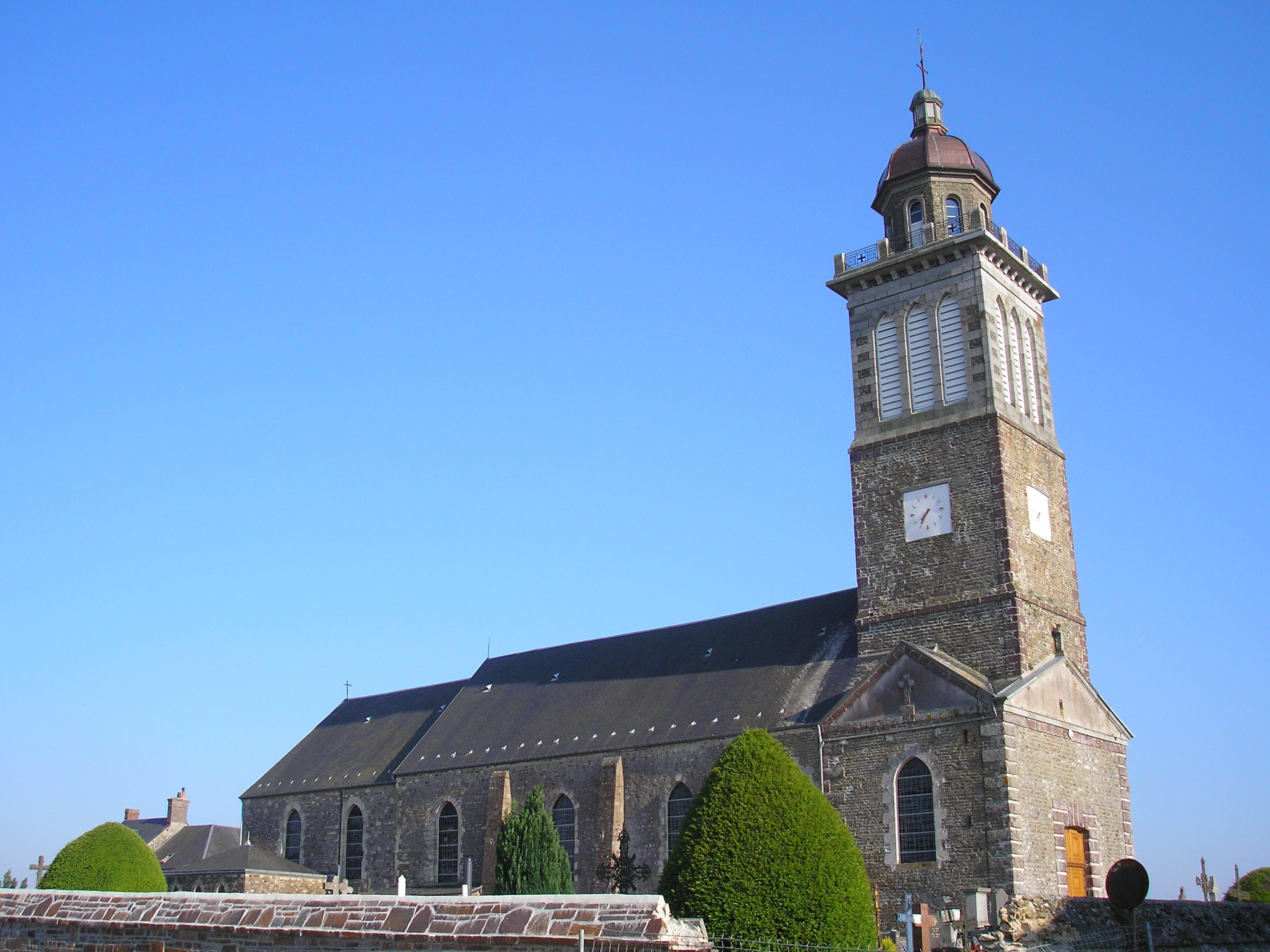
- The church in Saint-Amand
- Location of Saint-Amand-Villages
- Location within France Location within Normandy
- Coordinates: 49°02′35″N 0°57′50″W
- Country: France
- Region: Normandy
- Department: Manche
- Arrondissement: Saint-Lô
- Canton: Condé-sur-Vire
- Intercommunality: Saint-Lô Agglo

Government
  - Mayor (2020–2026): Jean Lebouvier
- Area^{1}: 38.19 km^{2} (14.75 sq mi)
- Population (2023): 2,525
  - Density: 66.12/km^{2} (171.2/sq mi)
- Time zone: UTC+01:00 (CET)
  - Summer (DST): UTC+02:00 (CEST)
- INSEE/Postal code: 50444 /50160
- ^{1} French Land Register data, which excludes lakes, ponds, glaciers > 1 km^{2} (0.386 sq mi or 247 acres) and river estuaries.

Saint-Amand-Villages (French pronunciation: [sɛ̃.t‿amɑ̃ vilaʒ]) is a commune in the department of Manche, northwestern France. The municipality was established on 1 January 2017 by merger of the former communes of Saint-Amand (the seat) and Placy-Montaigu.

== Population ==
Population data refer to the area corresponding with the commune as of January 2025.

Historical population
Year	Pop.	±% p.a.
1968	1,633	—
1975	1,506	−1.15%
1982	1,765	+2.29%
1990	2,006	+1.61%
1999	2,182	+0.94%
2007	2,387	+1.13%
2012	2,550	+1.33%
2017	2,529	−0.17%
2023	2,525	−0.03%
Source: INSEE

== See also ==
- Communes of the Manche department
