= Beaucoudray =

- Commune
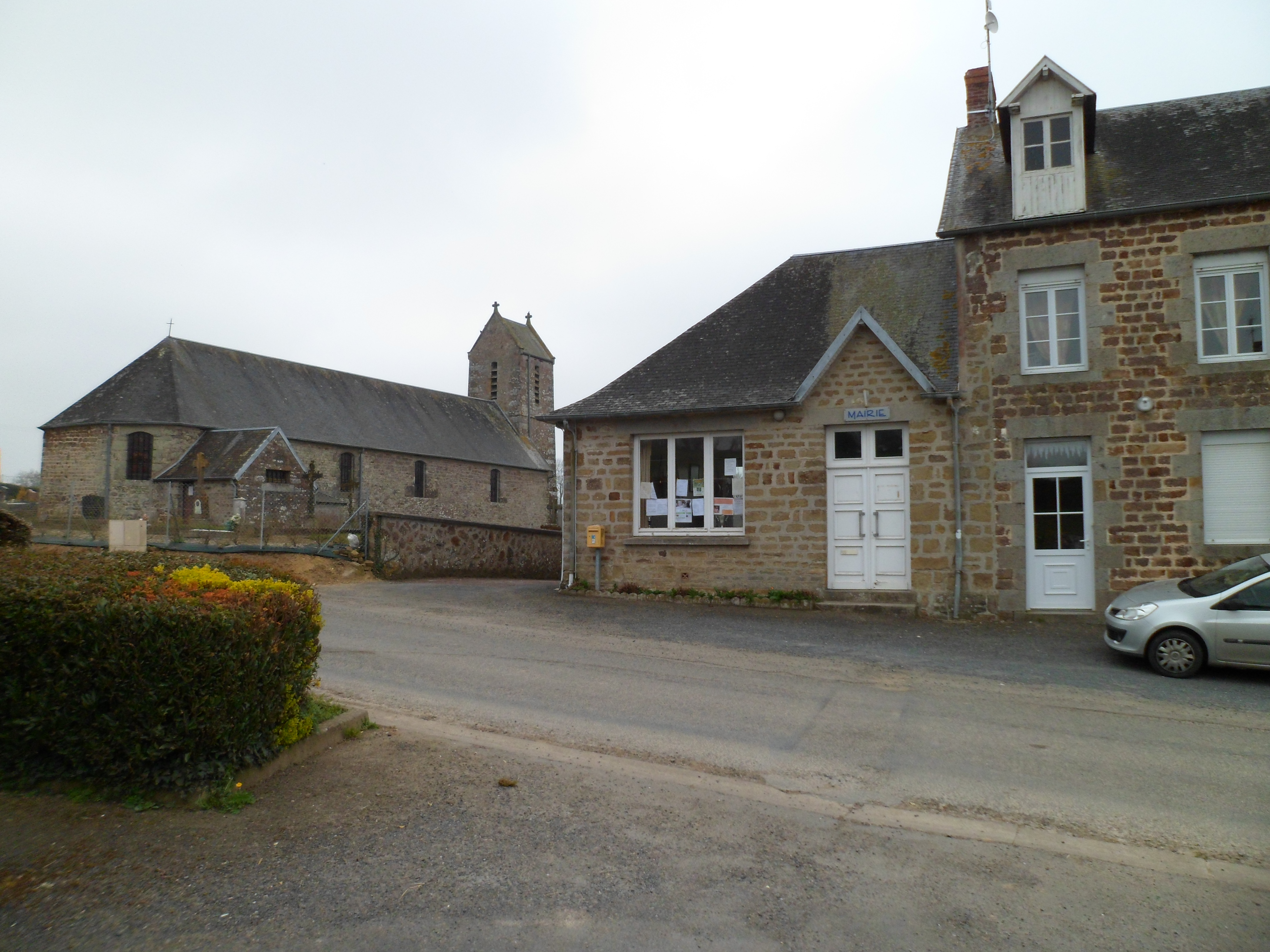
- The town hall and the church of Saint-Laurent
- Location of Beaucoudray
- Location within France Location within Normandy
- Coordinates: 48°57′33″N 1°08′27″W
- Country: France
- Region: Normandy
- Department: Manche
- Arrondissement: Saint-Lô
- Canton: Condé-sur-Vire
- Intercommunality: Saint-Lô Agglo

Government
  - Mayor (2020–2026): Michel de Beaucoudrey
- Area^{1}: 4.70 km^{2} (1.81 sq mi)
- Elevation: 170 m (560 ft)
- Highest elevation: 204 m (669 ft)
- Lowest elevation: 84 m (276 ft)
- Population (2023): 136
  - Density: 28.9/km^{2} (74.9/sq mi)
- Time zone: UTC+01:00 (CET)
  - Summer (DST): UTC+02:00 (CEST)
- INSEE/Postal code: 50039 /50420
- ^{1} French Land Register data, which excludes lakes, ponds, glaciers > 1 km^{2} (0.386 sq mi or 247 acres) and river estuaries.

Beaucoudray (French pronunciation: [bokudʁɛ]) is a commune in the Manche department in the Normandy region in northwestern France.

== Population ==
Historical population
Year	Pop.	±% p.a.
1968	188	—
1975	169	−1.51%
1982	131	−3.57%
1990	119	−1.19%
1999	129	+0.90%
2007	145	+1.47%
2012	154	+1.21%
2017	132	−3.04%
2023	136	+0.50%
Source: INSEE

== See also ==
- Communes of the Manche department
