= Saint-Vigor-des-Monts =

- Commune
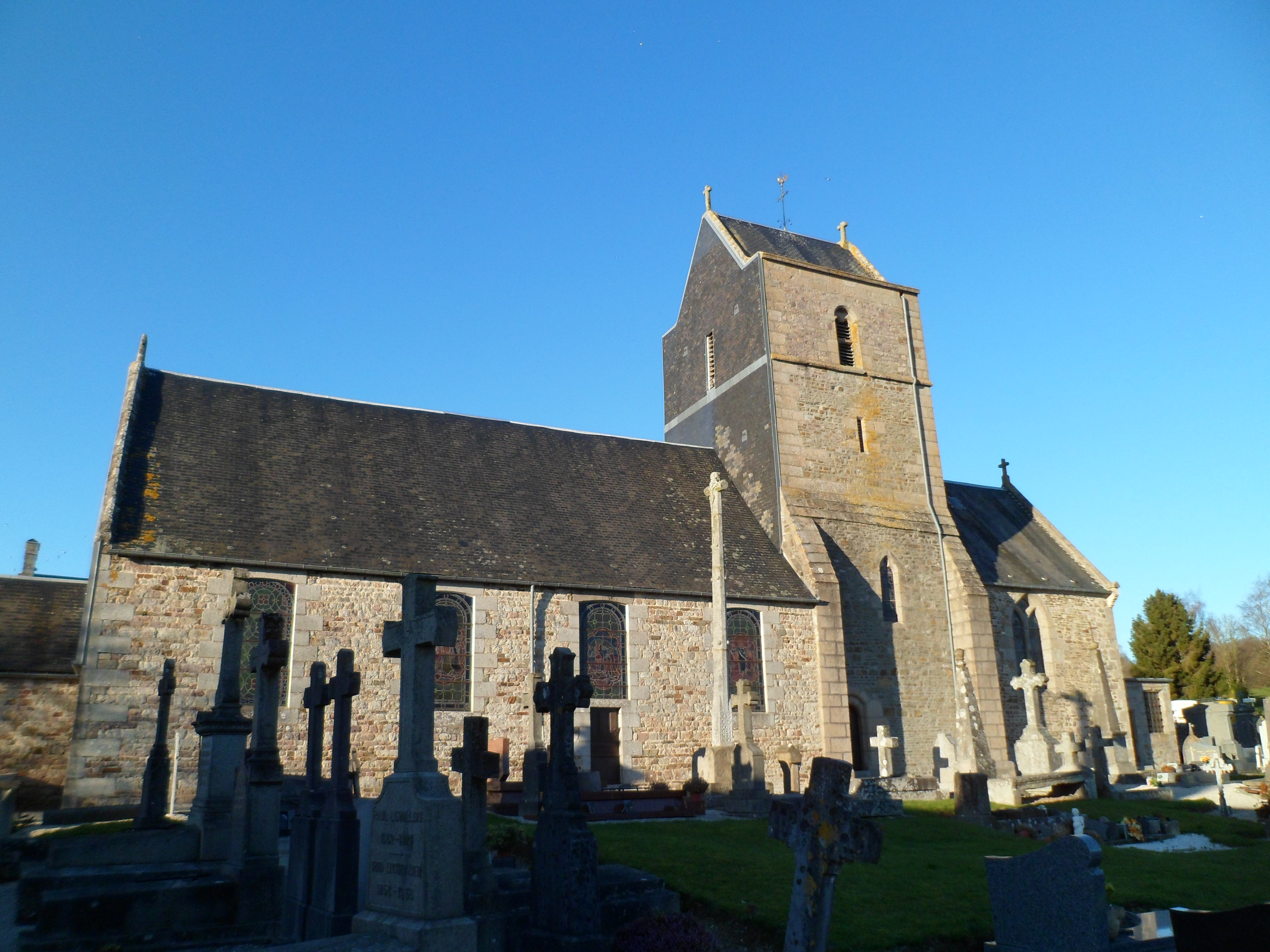
- The church of Saint-Vigor
- Location of Saint-Vigor-des-Monts
- Location within France Location within Normandy
- Coordinates: 48°54′39″N 1°04′09″W
- Country: France
- Region: Normandy
- Department: Manche
- Arrondissement: Saint-Lô
- Canton: Condé-sur-Vire
- Intercommunality: Saint-Lô Agglo

Government
  - Mayor (2020–2026): Liliane Boscher
- Area^{1}: 15.74 km^{2} (6.08 sq mi)
- Elevation: 140 m (460 ft)
- Highest elevation: 277 m (909 ft)
- Lowest elevation: 50 m (160 ft)
- Population (2023): 284
  - Density: 18.0/km^{2} (46.7/sq mi)
- Time zone: UTC+01:00 (CET)
  - Summer (DST): UTC+02:00 (CEST)
- INSEE/Postal code: 50563 /50420
- ^{1} French Land Register data, which excludes lakes, ponds, glaciers > 1 km^{2} (0.386 sq mi or 247 acres) and river estuaries.

Saint-Vigor-des-Monts (French pronunciation: [sɛ̃ viɡɔʁ de mɔ̃]) is a commune in the Manche department in Normandy in north-western France.

== See also ==
- Communes of the Manche department
