= D52 road (Calvados) =

Road in Calvados, France

Coordinates: 48.8819°N 0.9701°W

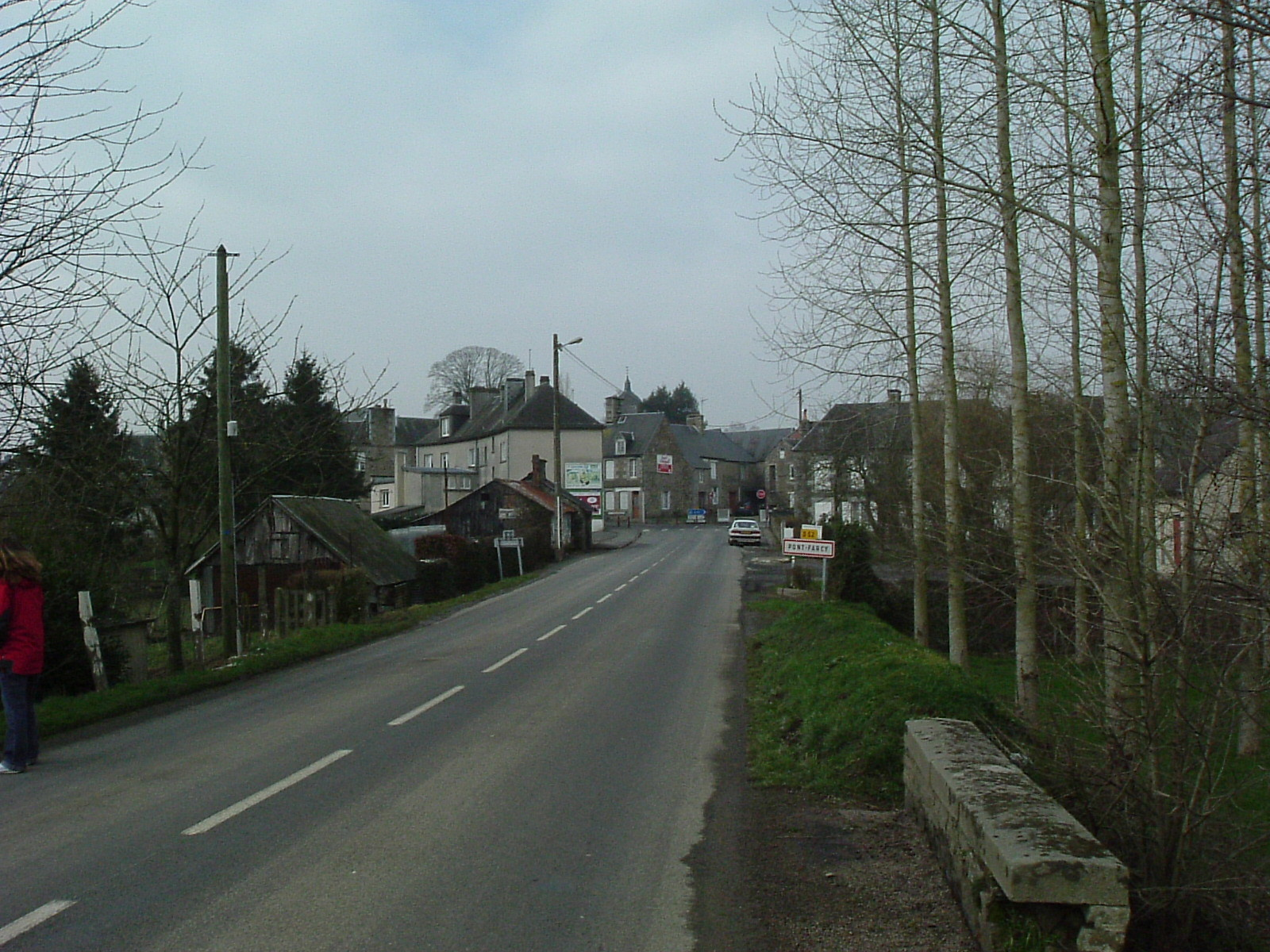
D52 in Pont-Farcy

The D52 road (French: Route départementale 52 or RD52) is a road connecting Pont-Farcy and Vire in the Calvados département in France.

== Route ==
The D52 forms part of the departmental road network in the Bocage virois area of Normandy. It connects the area around Pont-Farcy with Vire, providing a local road link between settlements in the region. Maps published by the Calvados administration show the D52 among the roads serving this area.
