= Lamberville, Manche =

Lamberville
- Commune
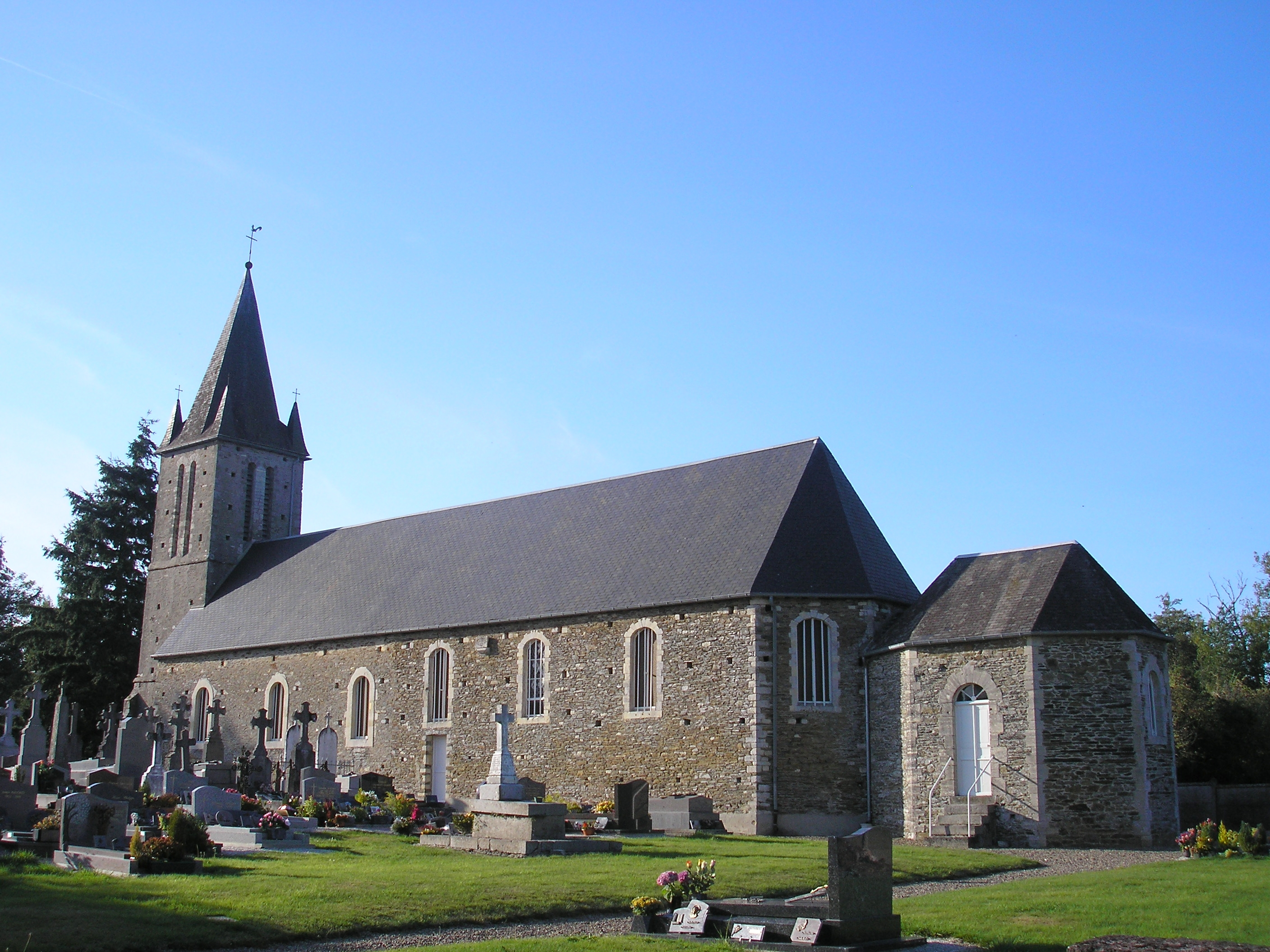
- The church of Saint-Jean
- Location of Lamberville
- Location within France Location within Normandy
- Coordinates: 49°05′10″N 0°54′27″W
- Country: France
- Region: Normandy
- Department: Manche
- Arrondissement: Saint-Lô
- Canton: Condé-sur-Vire
- Intercommunality: Saint-Lô Agglo

Government
  - Mayor (2020–2026): Bernard Fousse
- Area^{1}: 7.12 km^{2} (2.75 sq mi)
- Elevation: 150 m (490 ft)
- Highest elevation: 181 m (594 ft)
- Lowest elevation: 95 m (312 ft)
- Population (2023): 167
  - Density: 23.5/km^{2} (60.7/sq mi)
- Demonym: Lambervillais
- Time zone: UTC+01:00 (CET)
  - Summer (DST): UTC+02:00 (CEST)
- INSEE/Postal code: 50261 /50160
- ^{1} French Land Register data, which excludes lakes, ponds, glaciers > 1 km^{2} (0.386 sq mi or 247 acres) and river estuaries.

Lamberville (French pronunciation: [lɑ̃bɛʁvil]) is a commune in the Manche department in north-western France.

== See also ==
- Communes of the Manche department
