= Timur D'Vatz =

Russian painter

Timur D'Vatz (born 16 April 1968 in Moscow, Russia) is a figurative painter.

He began his education at the Republic College of Art (Uzbekistan) and London's Royal Academy of Arts in 1996. He has won several awards including the Guinness prize for First Time Exhibitor at the Royal Academy of Arts Summer Exhibition, 1994; the A.T Kearney prize, 1996; and the B.P Portrait award at London's National Portrait Gallery, 2002. His parents were both also artists.
