= Canton of Condé-sur-Vire =

Coordinates: 49.05°N 1.04°W

The canton of Condé-sur-Vire is an administrative division of the Manche department, northwestern France. It was created at the French canton reorganisation which came into effect in March 2015. Its seat is in Condé-sur-Vire.

It consists of the following communes:

1. Beaucoudray
2. Beuvrigny
3. Biéville
4. Condé-sur-Vire
5. Domjean
6. Fourneaux
7. Gouvets
8. Lamberville
9. Montrabot
10. Moyon-Villages
11. Le Perron
12. Saint-Amand-Villages
13. Saint-Jean-d'Elle
14. Saint-Louet-sur-Vire
15. Saint-Vigor-des-Monts
16. Tessy-Bocage
17. Torigny-les-Villes
