= Manche's 1st constituency =

Constituency of the National Assembly of France

1st constituency of Manche
- inline Constituency of the National Assembly of France

- Deputy: Philippe Gosselin; LR
- Department: Manche
- Cantons: Canisy - Carentan - Marigny - Montebourg - Percy - Saint-Clair-sur-l'Elle - Saint-Jean-de-Daye - Saint-Lô-Ouest - Saint-Lô-Est - Sainte-Mère-Église - Tessy-sur-Vire - Torigni-sur-Vire - Villedieu-les-Poêles
- Registered voters: 121,610

The 1st constituency of Manche is a French legislative constituency in the Manche département. Like the other 576 French constituencies, it elects one MP using the two-round system, with a run-off if no candidate receives over 50% of the vote in the first round.

== Deputies ==
Election	Member	Party
1958	Gabriel de Carville	CNIP
1962	Constant Lepourry	UNR
1967	Raymond Guilbert	DVD
1968	Raymond Guilbert	UDR
1973	Jean-Marie Daillet	CD
1978	Jean-Marie Daillet	UDF
1981	Jean-Marie Daillet	UDF
1986	Proportional representation – no election by constituency	
1988	Jean-Marie Daillet	UDF
1993	Jean-Claude Lemoine	RPR
1997	Jean-Claude Lemoine	RPR
2002	Jean-Claude Lemoine	UMP
2007	Philippe Gosselin	UMP
2012	Philippe Gosselin	UMP
2017	Philippe Gosselin	LR
2022	Philippe Gosselin	LR

Manche's 1st constituency has existed since 1958 and has always comprised the central-eastern part of the department, centered on Saint-Lô and has been won and served by centre-right or right-wing deputés (the series of its members for the Assemblée Nationale).

For its first election in 1958, the winner was Gabriel de Carville, a former military and general councillor for the canton of Marigny. A member of the right-wing National Centre of Independents and Farmers, he was defeated in the first round in 1962 by right-winger Constant Lepourry, a member of the Union for the New Republic, supporting Charles de Gaulle. In 1967, Lepourry, in turn, was defeated by Raymond Guilbert, another De Gaulle supporter, reelected in 1968.

In 1973, Jean-Marie Daillet, who also stood in the two elections just mentioned, won; a member of the Democratic Centre. He proved a vocal critic of the Veil Act, the decriminalization of abortion, debated in 1975. Daillet joins the UDF in 1978 in which year he was strongly reelected and again, this time by a clear majority in the first round, in 1981. The constituency was briefly abolished in 1986 but was reinstated, as was, for the 1988 election. Daillet was reelected for what would be his last term.

The 1993 legislative election brought national victory for the right-wing parties. In Manche's 1st constituency though Daillet retired, the top two candidates were right-wing: the UDF's Georges de La Loyère, from Montreuil-sur-Lozon, and RPR's Jean-Claude Lemoine. Lemoine, also a vice-president of the general council, won. He was by a wide margin reelected in 1997 and 2002. He stood down for 2007; he died a few months after the election.

Philippe Gosselin, the former Lemoine substitute and mayor of Remilly-sur-Lozon, was the main right-wing candidate for the UMP in 2007. He was elected with a strongly approving margin. 2012 marked the best showing for a left-winger to that point and for elections since: Christine Le Coz, the socialist general councillor for the canton of Saint-Lô-East, won a narrowly losing 47.5 % of the vote in the two-candidate run-off. Gosselin was one of the main parliamentary opponents to the Law 2013-404 opening marriage to same-sex couples. In 2017, Gosselin is reelected against the En Marche ! candidate. Gosselin won his fourth mandate in 2022 via a run-off's 68% of the vote, opposed to a green candidate, supported by the left-wing NUPES alliance; whereas in 2024 he won against a National Rally candidate of the far right, by a slightly reduced margin.

== Election results ==
=== 2024 ===
Legislative Election 2024: Manche's 1st constituency
Party	Candidate	Votes	%	±%
DVC (Ensemble)	Michaël Masson	4,723	8.04	N/A
LÉ–EELV (NFP)	Guillaume Hédouin	250	0.43	−19.01
LO	Olivia Lewi	578	0.98	N/A
LR	Philippe Gosselin	22,513	38.30	−1.18
RN	Franck Simon	19,333	32.89	16.32
DIV	Jacques Poisson	171	0.29	N/A
REC	Laurent Besagny	418	0.71	−1.29
DVE	Baptiste Rajaut	250	0.43	N/A
Turnout		58 778	97.91	+48.47
Registered electors		86,727		
2nd round result
LR	Philippe Gosselin	36,531	63.45	+25.15
RN	Franck Simon	21,046	36.55	+3.88
Turnout		57,577	96.26	−1.65
Registered electors		86,729		
LR gain from				

=== 2022 ===
Legislative Election 2022: Manche's 1st constituency
Party	Candidate	Votes	%	±%
LR (UDC)	Philippe Gosselin	16,786	39.48	+8.66
EELV (NUPÉS)	Guillaume Hedouin	8,265	19.44	+0.31
MoDem (Ensemble)	Laurent Pien	7,421	17.46	−17.89
RN	Franck Simon	7,045	16.57	+4.90
REC	Victor Jan De Lagillardaie	850	2.00	N/A
Others	N/A	2,148	5.05	
Turnout		42,515	49.44	−3.37
2nd round result
LR (UDC)	Philippe Gosselin	27,166	68.78	+16.28
EELV (NUPÉS)	Guillaume Hedouin	12,331	31.22	N/A
Turnout		39,497	47.37	+0.03
LR hold				

=== 2017 ===
Candidate	Label	First round		Second round	
Candidate	Label	Votes	%	Votes	%
Benoîte Nouet	REM	15,936	35.35	18,131	47.50
Philippe Gosselin	LR	13,894	30.82	20,043	52.50
Franck Simon	FN	5,258	11.67		
Aurélien Marion	FI	3,753	8.33		
Clémence Maulat	PS	2,421	5.37		
Jérôme Virlouvet	ECO	1,714	3.80		
Corinne Vautier	PCF	733	1.63		
Lionel Carau	EXD	554	1.23		
Olivia Lewi	EXG	304	0.67		
David Guillaume	DIV	300	0.67		
Philippe Reto	DVG	208	0.46		
Votes		45,075	100.00	38,174	100.00
Valid votes		45,075	98.18	38,174	92.76
Blank votes		631	1.37	2,206	5.36
Null votes		205	0.45	773	1.88
Turnout		45,911	52.81	41,153	47.34
Abstentions		41,023	47.19	45,776	52.66
Registered voters		86,934		86,929	
Source: Ministry of the Interior

=== 2012 ===
Legislative Election 2012: Manche's 1st constituency
Party	Candidate	Votes	%	±%
UMP	Philippe Gosselin	21,377	41.73	
PS	Christine Le Coz	19,282	37.64	
FN	Denis Feret	4,674	9.12	
FG	Isabelle Le Cann	1,725	3.37	
Far right	Fernand Le Rachinel	1,665	3.25	
EELV	Jérôme Virlouvet	1,344	2.62	
Others	N/A	1,158		
Turnout		51,225	59.22	
2nd round result
UMP	Philippe Gosselin	27,049	52.53	
PS	Christine Le Coz	24,440	47.47	
Turnout		51,489	59.52	
UMP hold				

=== 2007 ===
Legislative Election 2007: Manche 1st - 2nd round
Party	Candidate	Votes	%	±%
UMP	Philippe Gosselin	25,346	57.71	
PS	Jean-Karl Deschamps	18,571	42.29	
Turnout		45,173	60.66	
UMP hold		Swing		

== Sources and References ==
- French Interior Ministry results website: "Résultats électoraux officiels en France" (in French).
