= Marigny =

Marigny can refer to:

== People ==
- Enguerrand de Marigny (1260-1315), chamberlain and minister of Philip IV the Fair
- Antoine Philippe de Marigny (1721-1779), colonial official in French Louisiana; geographer, cartographer, explorer
  - Pierre de Marigny (1751-1800), father of Bernard de Marigny, son of Antoine Philippe de Marigny
  - Bernard de Marigny (1785-1868), a Creole politician and developer in 19th century New Orleans
  - Antoine James de Marigny (a.k.a. Mandeville de Marigny, 1811–1890), son of Bernard de Marigny, Louisiana planter and military officer
- Abel François Poisson, marquis de Marigny, brother to Madame de Pompadour and supervisor of the King's Buildings
- Alfred de Marigny, acquitted of the murder of Sir Harry Oakes in Nassau
- Charles de Bernard de Marigny, French admiral (1740-1816)
- Jean-Paul de Marigny, Australian football coach
- Jean Marigny (born 1939), French specialist on vampires and English literature academic

== Places ==
Marigny is the name or part of the name of several communes in France:

- Marigny, Allier
- Marigny, Deux-Sèvres
- Marigny, Jura
- Marigny, Manche
- Marigny, Marne
- Marigny, Saône-et-Loire
- Marigny-Brizay, in the Vienne département
- Marigny-Chemereau, in the Vienne département
- Marigny-en-Orxois, in the Aisne département
- Marigny-le-Cahouët, in the Côte-d'Or département
- Marigny-le-Châtel, in the Aube département
- Marigny-le-Lozon, in the Manche département
- Marigny-l'Église, in the Nièvre département
- Marigny-lès-Reullée, in the Côte-d'Or département
- Marigny-les-Usages, in the Loiret département
- Marigny-Marmande, in the Indre-et-Loire département
- Marigny-Saint-Marcel, in the Haute-Savoie département
- Marigny-sur-Yonne, in the Nièvre département

Elsewhere

- Faubourg Marigny, a neighborhood of New Orleans, Louisiana, U.S.

== Other ==
- Hôtel de Marigny, the official residence for State visitors in Paris
- Marigny Opera House, an opera house in New Orleans
- Théâtre Marigny, legitimate theatre in Paris
- Théâtre des Folies-Marigny, operetta theatre in Paris from 1864 to 1881
