= Le Mesnil-Vigot =

- Part of Remilly-les-Marais
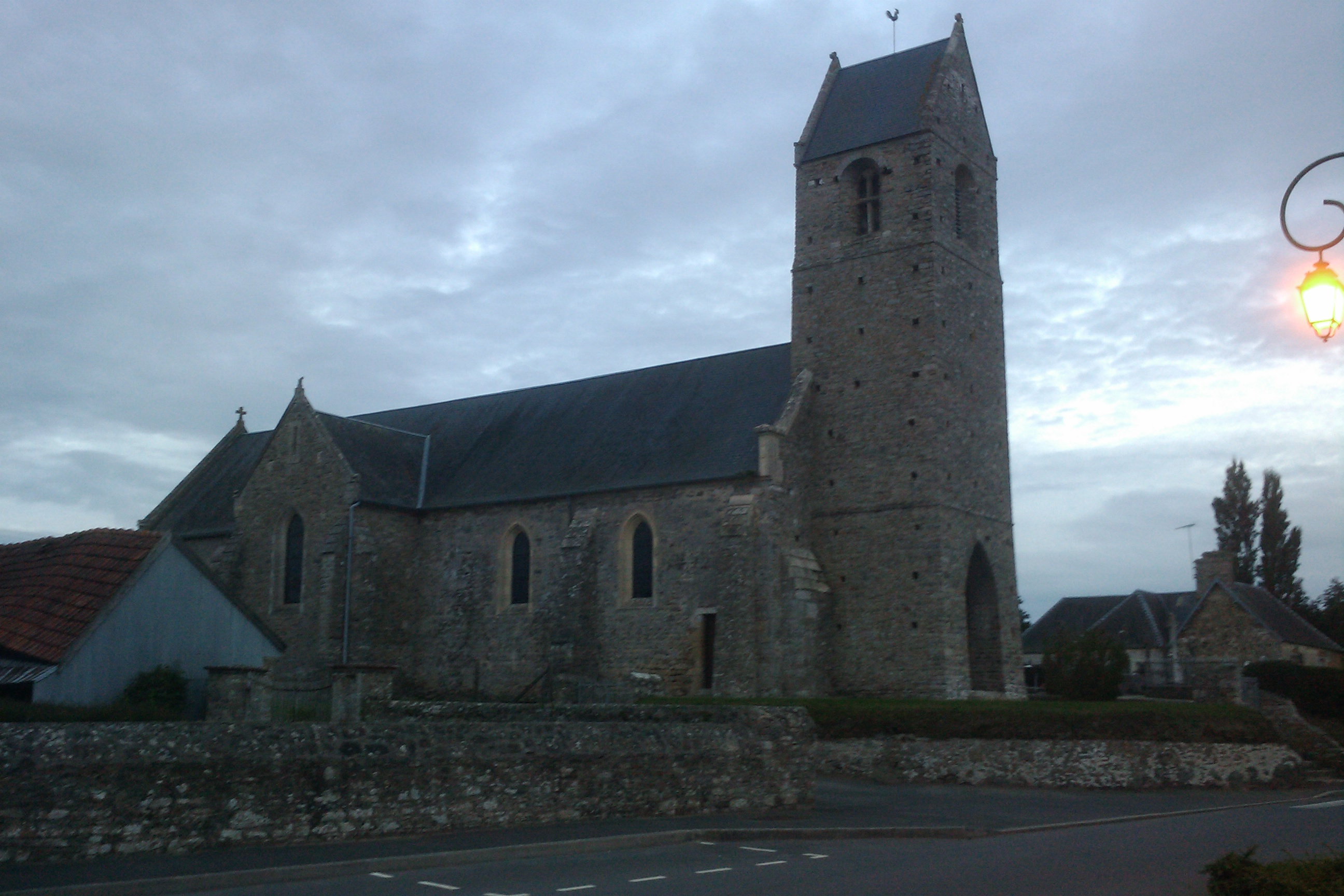
- The church of Saint-Germain
- Location of Le Mesnil-Vigot
- Location within France Location within Normandy
- Coordinates: 49°09′22″N 1°16′51″W
- Country: France
- Region: Normandy
- Department: Manche
- Arrondissement: Saint-Lô
- Canton: Saint-Lô-1
- Commune: Remilly-les-Marais
- Area^{1}: 3.26 km^{2} (1.26 sq mi)
- Elevation: 17 m (56 ft)
- Highest elevation: 37 m (121 ft)
- Lowest elevation: 2 m (6.6 ft)
- Population (2022): 220
  - Density: 67/km^{2} (170/sq mi)
- Time zone: UTC+01:00 (CET)
  - Summer (DST): UTC+02:00 (CEST)
- Postal code: 50570
- ^{1} French Land Register data, which excludes lakes, ponds, glaciers > 1 km^{2} (0.386 sq mi or 247 acres) and river estuaries.

Le Mesnil-Vigot (French pronunciation: [lə menil viɡo]) is a former commune in the Manche department in Normandy in north-western France. On 1 January 2017, it was merged into the new commune Remilly-les-Marais.

== See also ==
- Communes of the Manche department
