= Blainville-Crevon =

- Commune
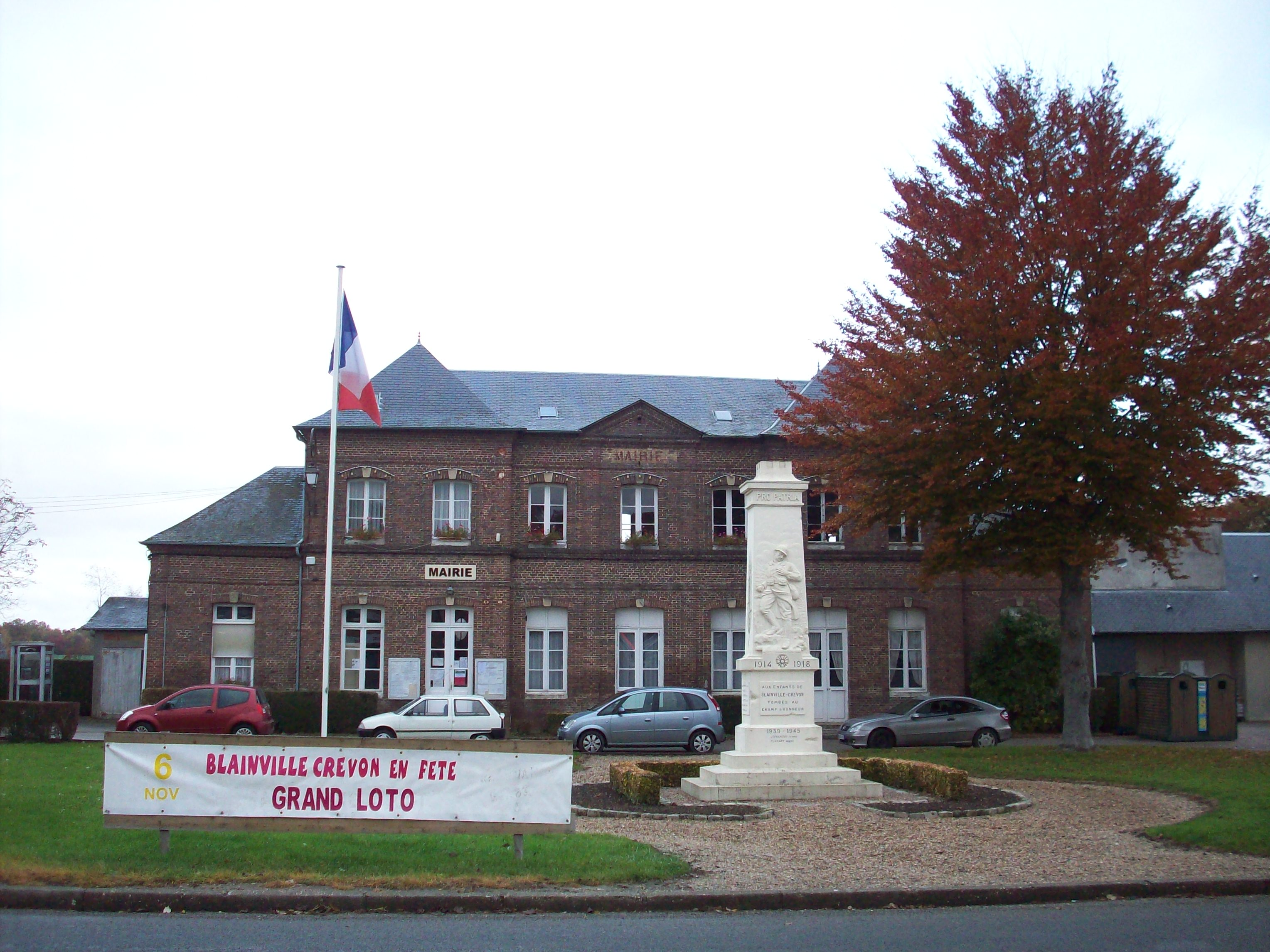
- Village hall

- Coat of arms
- Location of Blainville-Crevon
- Location within France Location within Normandy
- Coordinates: 49°30′15″N 1°18′07″E
- Country: France
- Region: Normandy
- Department: Seine-Maritime
- Arrondissement: Rouen
- Canton: Le Mesnil-Esnard

Government
  - Mayor (2026–32): Philippe Picard
- Area^{1}: 14.8 km^{2} (5.7 sq mi)
- Elevation: 94 m (308 ft)
- Highest elevation: 166 m (545 ft)
- Lowest elevation: 83 m (272 ft)
- Population (2023): 1,226
  - Density: 82.8/km^{2} (215/sq mi)
- Time zone: UTC+01:00 (CET)
  - Summer (DST): UTC+02:00 (CEST)
- INSEE/Postal code: 76100 /76116
- ^{1} French Land Register data, which excludes lakes, ponds, glaciers > 1 km^{2} (0.386 sq mi or 247 acres) and river estuaries.

Blainville-Crevon (French pronunciation: [blɛ̃vil kʁəvɔ̃]) is a commune in the Seine-Maritime département of the Normandy region of northern France.

== Geography ==
A farming village situated by the banks of the river Crevon in the Pays de Caux, some 10 miles (16 km) northeast of Rouen, at the junction of the D12, D7 and the D98 roads.

== Toponymy ==
Medieval place-name in -ville (from Gallo-Romance VILLA 'farm, estate'). Mentioned as Bleduinvilla in 1050 - 1060. Probably *Bladwinus 'estate, Germanic name *Bladwinus is never recorded, but belongs possibly to the developments of the anthroponymic element blad. A similar name can be recognized in Blainville-sur-l'Eau (Villa Bladini 10th century) 'the estate of Bladinus '

Crevon is a former parrish (Chevron 1068–76, Kevron 13th century, Quevron → 16th). Crevon is the metathesis of the Norman Quevron, that is chevron 'beam' in French, that is to say "beam to cross the stream". The stream itself is now called Crevon. A similar Norman placename in Manche département is Hébécrevon, with the personal name Hébert (Herbert).

== History ==
It appeared for the first time in a charter by William the Conqueror referring to the Clères family feudal motte. Becoming the possession of the Mauquenchy family, Blainville became a true fortress and was subsequently confiscated by the English at the beginning of the Hundred Years War and again in 1435.

Later, it became the possession of Jean d'Estouteville, who restored the castle and founded the college. During the French reconquest of Normandy, Henry IV held a council of war at Blainville Castle on the eve of the fall of Rouen. The last owners, the Colbert-Seignelay family, demolished the old castle and built a château. The Chateau de Blainville was completely razed during the French Revolution.

Around 1820, the two neighbouring villages of St-Arnoult and Crevon were joined with Blainville to become Blainville-Crevon.

It is a village of art, culture and history. A festival of world music named "Archeo-Jazz" takes place here annually at the end of June in the ruins of the medieval castle.

=== Heraldry ===
Arms of Blainville-Crevon	The arms of Blainville-Crevon are blazoned : Azure, a cross between 20 cross-crosslets (each group of 5 arranged in saltire) argent.

== Population ==
Historical population
Year	Pop.	±% p.a.
1968	508	—
1975	575	+1.79%
1982	797	+4.77%
1990	1,096	+4.06%
1999	1,113	+0.17%
2007	1,127	+0.16%
2012	1,191	+1.11%
2017	1,209	+0.30%
2023	1,226	+0.23%
Source: INSEE

== Places of interest ==
- The church of St.Michel, dating from the 15th century.
- The ruins of the 13th-century castle of Ac.
- The château de Mondétour, dating from the 18th century.

== People with links to the commune ==
- Marcel Duchamp (1887–1968), a painter and sculptor, was born here.
- Suzanne Duchamp-Crotti (1889–1963), his sister, also a painter.

== See also ==
- Communes of the Seine-Maritime department
