= Les Champs =

Les Champs may refer to several communes in France:

- Les Champs-de-Losque, Manche, Normandy
- Les Champs-Géraux, Côtes-d'Armor, Brittany

== See also ==
- Le Champ (disambiguation)
