= Lozon =

Commune in Manche, France

- Part of Marigny-le-Lozon
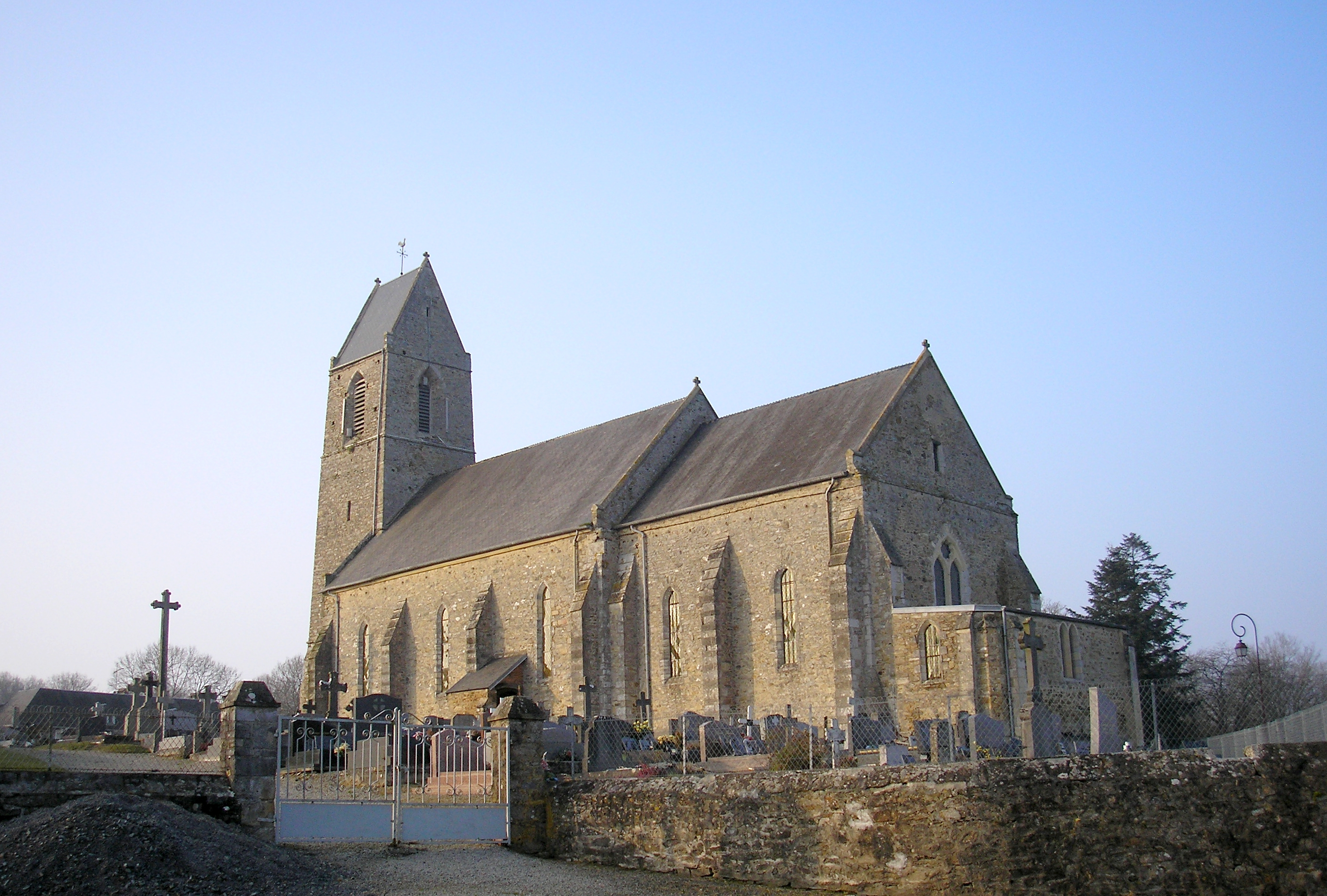
- The church of Saint-Lô
- Location of Lozon
- Location within France Location within Normandy
- Coordinates: 49°08′35″N 1°15′40″W
- Country: France
- Region: Normandy
- Department: Manche
- Arrondissement: Saint-Lô
- Canton: Saint-Lô-1
- Commune: Marigny-le-Lozon
- Area^{1}: 8.86 km^{2} (3.42 sq mi)
- Elevation: 85 m (279 ft)
- Highest elevation: 94 m (308 ft)
- Lowest elevation: 4 m (13 ft)
- Population (2022): 326
  - Density: 36.8/km^{2} (95.3/sq mi)
- Time zone: UTC+01:00 (CET)
  - Summer (DST): UTC+02:00 (CEST)
- Postal code: 50570
- ^{1} French Land Register data, which excludes lakes, ponds, glaciers > 1 km^{2} (0.386 sq mi or 247 acres) and river estuaries.

Lozon (French pronunciation: [lozɔ̃]) is a former commune in the Manche department in Normandy in north-western France. On 1 January 2016, it was merged into the new commune of Marigny-le-Lozon.

== See also ==
- Communes of the Manche department
