= La Chapelle-en-Juger =

- Part of Thèreval
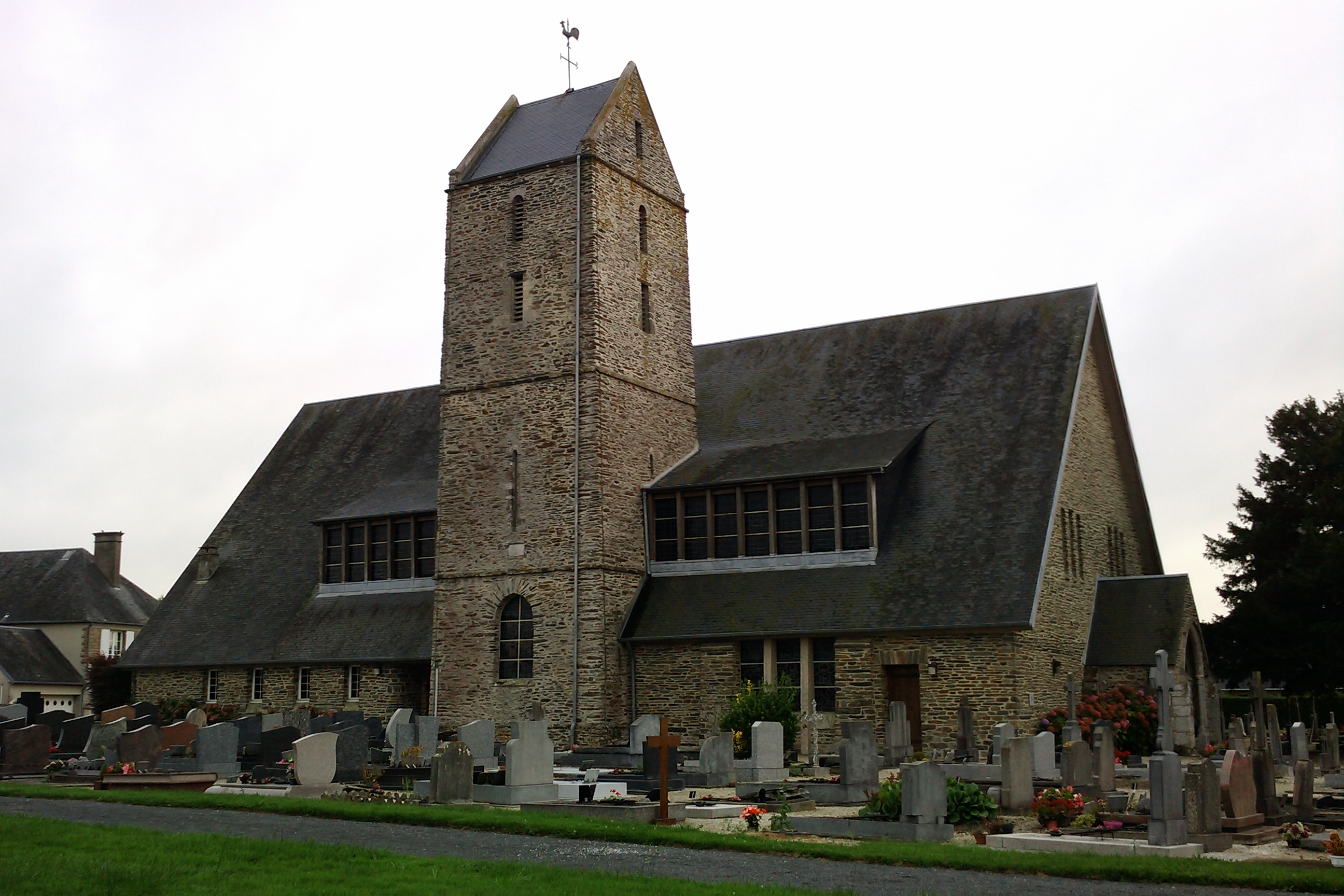
- The church of Saint-Pierre
- Location of La Chapelle-en-Juger
- Location within France Location within Normandy
- Coordinates: 49°07′41″N 1°12′56″W
- Country: France
- Region: Normandy
- Department: Manche
- Arrondissement: Saint-Lô
- Canton: Saint-Lô-1
- Commune: Thèreval
- Area^{1}: 15.00 km^{2} (5.79 sq mi)
- Elevation: 97 m (318 ft)
- Highest elevation: 112 m (367 ft)
- Lowest elevation: 17 m (56 ft)
- Population (2022): 647
  - Density: 43.1/km^{2} (112/sq mi)
- Time zone: UTC+01:00 (CET)
  - Summer (DST): UTC+02:00 (CEST)
- Postal code: 50570
- ^{1} French Land Register data, which excludes lakes, ponds, glaciers > 1 km^{2} (0.386 sq mi or 247 acres) and river estuaries.

La Chapelle-en-Juger (French pronunciation: [la ʃapɛl ɑ̃ ʒyʒe]) is a former commune in the Manche department in Normandy in north-western France. On 1 January 2016, it was merged into the new commune of Thèreval.

The local name of the commune is La Chapelle-Enjuger, as indicated in local sollicitor's documents.

== World War II ==
After the liberation of the area by Allied Forces in early June 1944, engineers of the Ninth Air Force IX Engineering Command began construction of a combat Advanced Landing Ground to the south of the town. Declared operational on 5 July, the airfield was designated as "A-5", it was used by the 404th Fighter Group which flew P-47 Thunderbolts until the end of August when the unit moved into Central France. Afterward, the airfield was closed.

== See also ==
- Communes of the Manche department
