= Remilly Les Marais =

- Commune
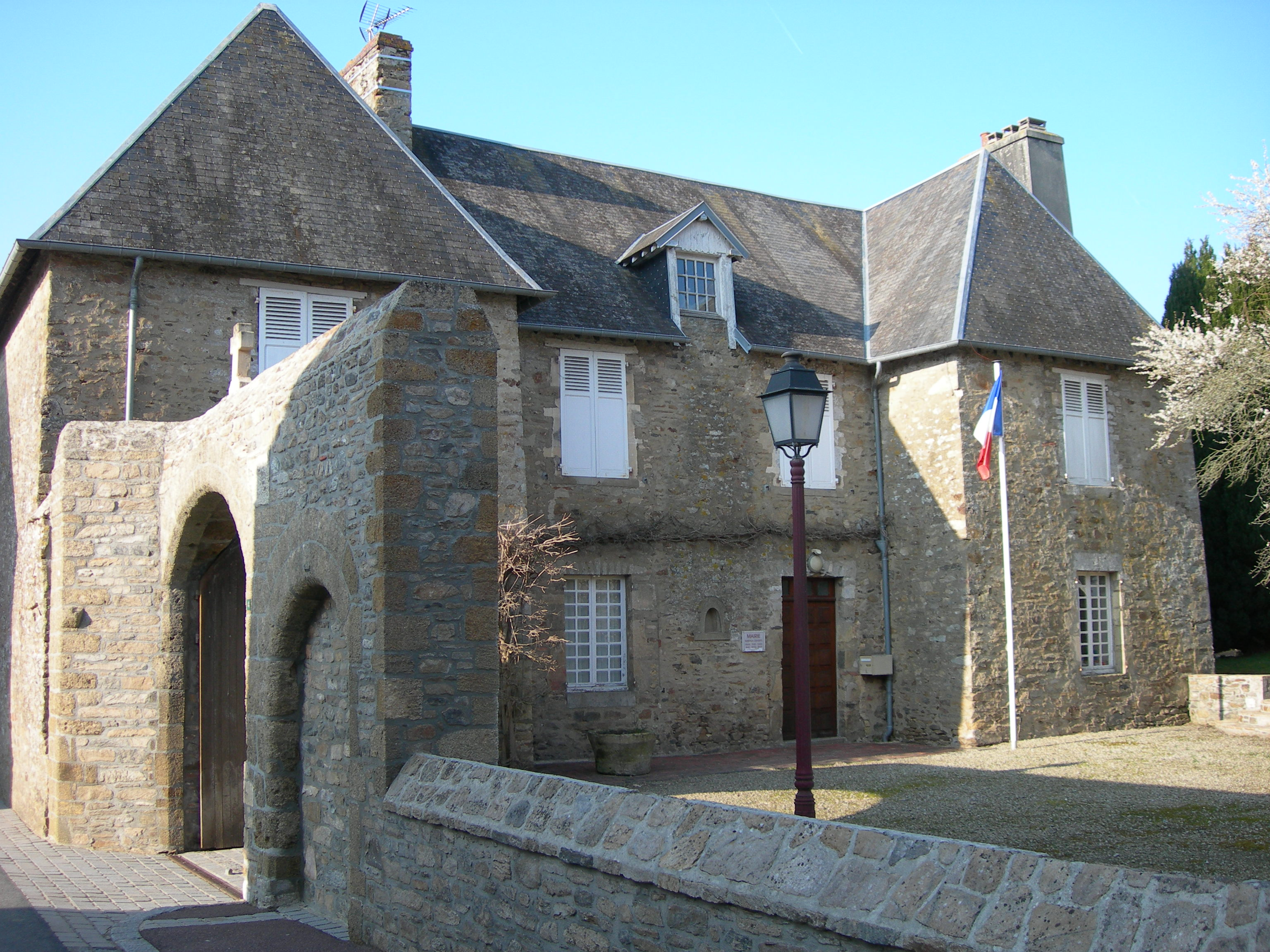
- The town hall in Remilly-sur-Lozon
- Location of Remilly Les Marais
- Location within France Location within Normandy
- Coordinates: 49°10′52″N 1°15′25″W
- Country: France
- Region: Normandy
- Department: Manche
- Arrondissement: Saint-Lô
- Canton: Saint-Lô-1
- Intercommunality: Saint-Lô Agglo

Government
  - Mayor (2020–2026): Marie Josèphe Baugé
- Area^{1}: 22.13 km^{2} (8.54 sq mi)
- Population (2023): 1,062
  - Density: 47.99/km^{2} (124.3/sq mi)
- Time zone: UTC+01:00 (CET)
  - Summer (DST): UTC+02:00 (CEST)
- INSEE/Postal code: 50431 /50570
- ^{1} French Land Register data, which excludes lakes, ponds, glaciers > 1 km^{2} (0.386 sq mi or 247 acres) and river estuaries.

Remilly Les Marais (French pronunciation: [ʁemiji le maʁɛ]; also Rémilly Les Marais) is a commune in the department of Manche, northwestern France. The municipality was established on 1 January 2017 by merger of the former communes of Remilly-sur-Lozon (the seat), Les Champs-de-Losque and Le Mesnil-Vigot.

== See also ==
- Communes of the Manche department
