= Le Champ =

Le Champ may refer to several communes in France:

- Le Champ-de-la-Pierre, Orne
- Le Champ-près-Froges, Isère
- Le Champ-Saint-Père, Vendée, Pays de la Loire

== See also ==
- Les Champs (disambiguation)
