= Le Lorey =

- Commune
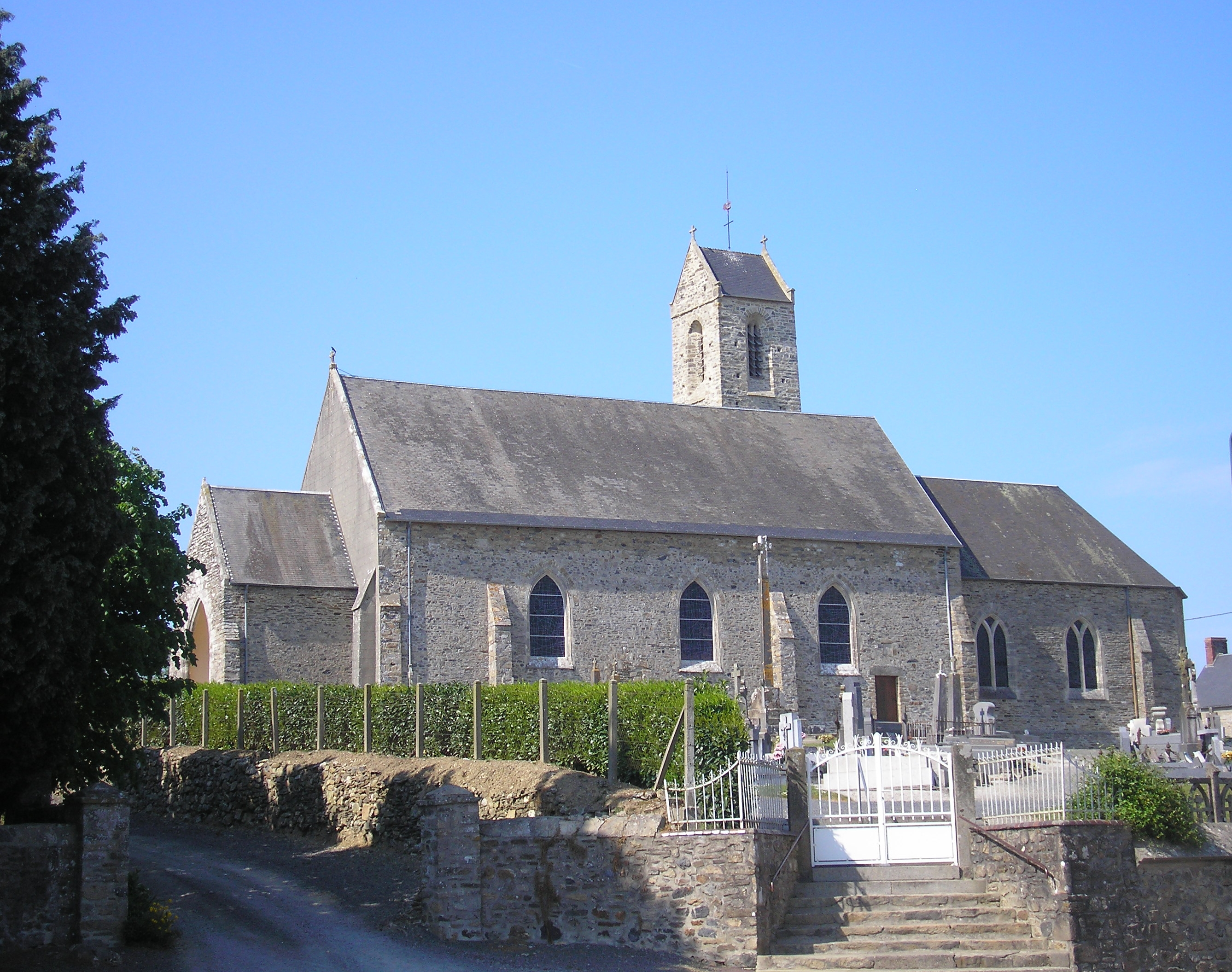
- The church of Saint-Martin
- Location of Le Lorey
- Location within France Location within Normandy
- Coordinates: 49°05′41″N 1°18′19″W
- Country: France
- Region: Normandy
- Department: Manche
- Arrondissement: Saint-Lô
- Canton: Saint-Lô-1
- Intercommunality: Saint-Lô Agglo

Government
  - Mayor (2020–2026): Michel Savary
- Area^{1}: 14.57 km^{2} (5.63 sq mi)
- Elevation: 86 m (282 ft)
- Highest elevation: 147 m (482 ft)
- Lowest elevation: 38 m (125 ft)
- Population (2023): 555
  - Density: 38.1/km^{2} (98.7/sq mi)
- Time zone: UTC+01:00 (CET)
  - Summer (DST): UTC+02:00 (CEST)
- INSEE/Postal code: 50279 /50570
- ^{1} French Land Register data, which excludes lakes, ponds, glaciers > 1 km^{2} (0.386 sq mi or 247 acres) and river estuaries.

Le Lorey (French pronunciation: [lə lɔʁɛ]) is a commune in the Manche department in Normandy in north-western France.

== Toponym ==
The name of the commune has been attested in various forms: de Loiré at the end of the 12th century, Loreium around 1210 and Loretum around 1280. The original toponym, lauretum, is of Latin origin and means "place where laurels are planted".

== See also ==
- Communes of the Manche department
