= Agneaux =

- Commune
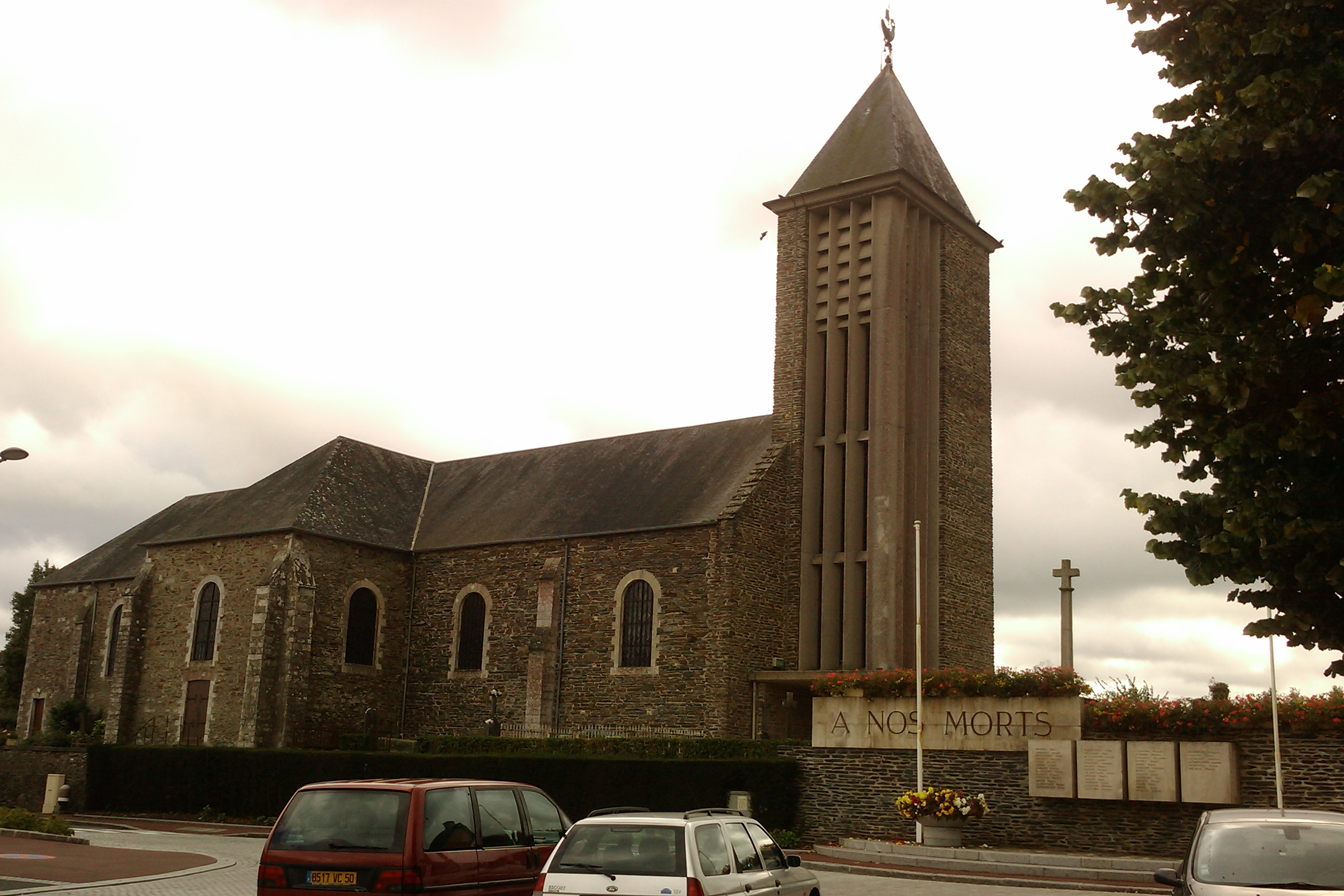
- Saint-Jean-Baptiste church
- Location of Agneaux
- Location within France Location within Normandy
- Coordinates: 49°07′03″N 1°06′34″W
- Country: France
- Region: Normandy
- Department: Manche
- Arrondissement: Saint-Lô
- Canton: Saint-Lô-1
- Intercommunality: Saint-Lô Agglo

Government
  - Mayor (2024–2026): Patrick Simon
- Area^{1}: 6.50 km^{2} (2.51 sq mi)
- Elevation: 60 m (200 ft)
- Highest elevation: 86 m (282 ft)
- Lowest elevation: 7 m (23 ft)
- Population (2023): 4,286
  - Density: 659/km^{2} (1,710/sq mi)
- Time zone: UTC+01:00 (CET)
  - Summer (DST): UTC+02:00 (CEST)
- INSEE/Postal code: 50002 /50180
- ^{1} French Land Register data, which excludes lakes, ponds, glaciers > 1 km^{2} (0.386 sq mi or 247 acres) and river estuaries.

Agneaux (French pronunciation: [aɲo]) is a commune in the Manche department in the Normandy region in northwestern France.

== Population ==
Historical population
Year	Pop.	±% p.a.
1968	2,308	—
1975	2,819	+2.90%
1982	3,716	+4.03%
1990	4,173	+1.46%
1999	4,476	+0.78%
2007	4,161	−0.91%
2012	4,155	−0.03%
2017	4,027	−0.62%
2023	4,286	+1.04%
Source: INSEE

== See also ==
- Communes of the Manche department
