= Hébécrevon =

- Part of Thèreval
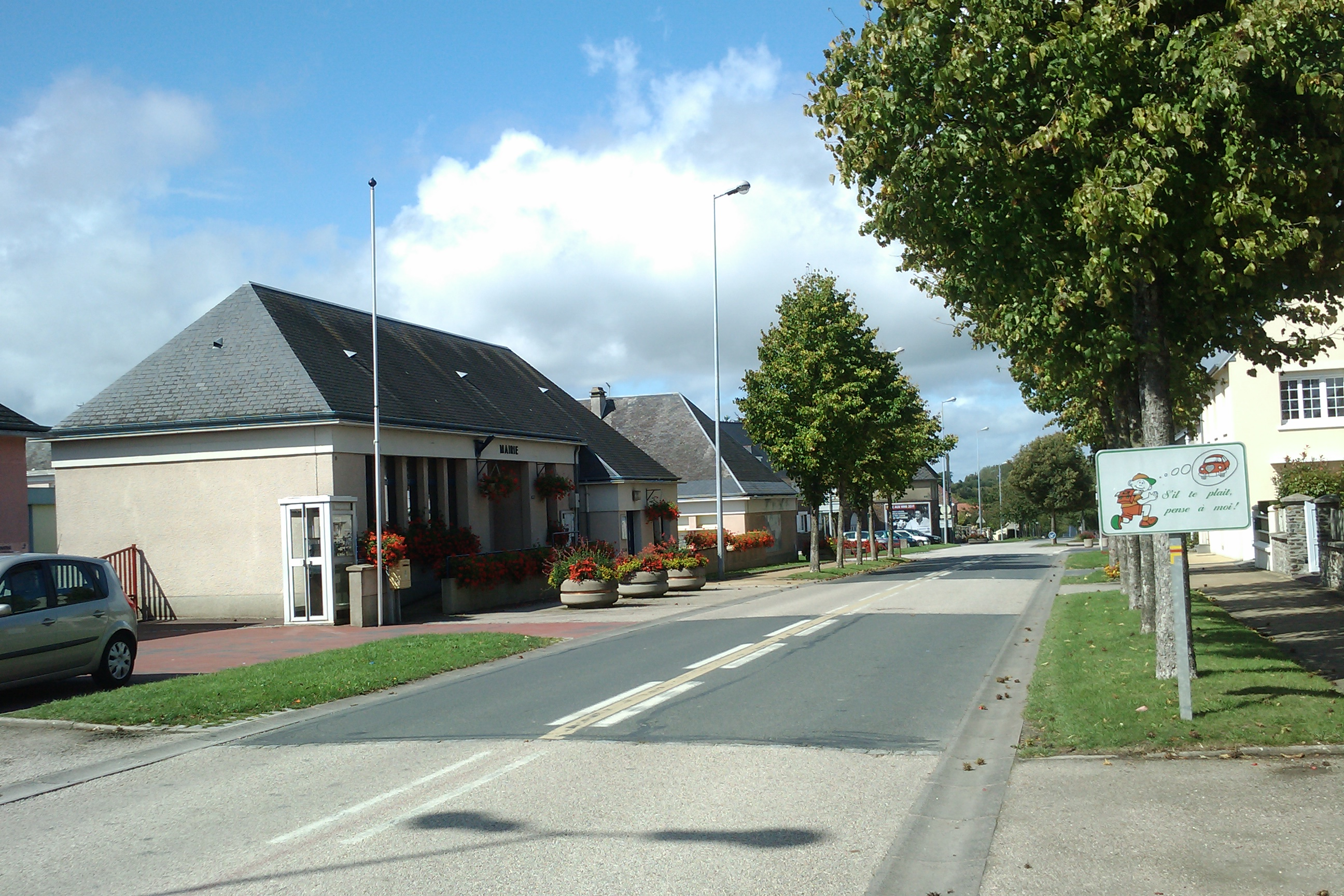
- the center of the commune
- Location of Hébécrevon
- Location within France Location within Normandy
- Coordinates: 49°07′37″N 1°09′54″W
- Country: France
- Region: Normandy
- Department: Manche
- Arrondissement: Saint-Lô
- Canton: Saint-Lô-1
- Commune: Thèreval
- Area^{1}: 13.39 km^{2} (5.17 sq mi)
- Elevation: 60 m (200 ft)
- Highest elevation: 108 m (354 ft)
- Lowest elevation: 7 m (23 ft)
- Population (2022): 1,134
  - Density: 84.69/km^{2} (219.3/sq mi)
- Time zone: UTC+01:00 (CET)
  - Summer (DST): UTC+02:00 (CEST)
- Postal code: 50180
- ^{1} French Land Register data, which excludes lakes, ponds, glaciers > 1 km^{2} (0.386 sq mi or 247 acres) and river estuaries.

Hébécrevon (French pronunciation: [ebekʁəvɔ̃]) is a former commune in the Manche department in Normandy in north-western France. On 1 January 2016, it was merged into the new commune of Thèreval.

== History ==
Hébécrevon was the site of many battles in July 1944 leading to the Allied victory of the St. Lo campaign in July 1944. It was here that US Army Forward Artillery observer Lt. Henry Victor Crawford, and his jeep driver, Corporal Charles Brown died, just yards from the Hebecrevon Church.

== See also ==
- Communes of the Manche department
