= Marigny, Manche =

Marigny
- Part of Marigny-le-Lozon
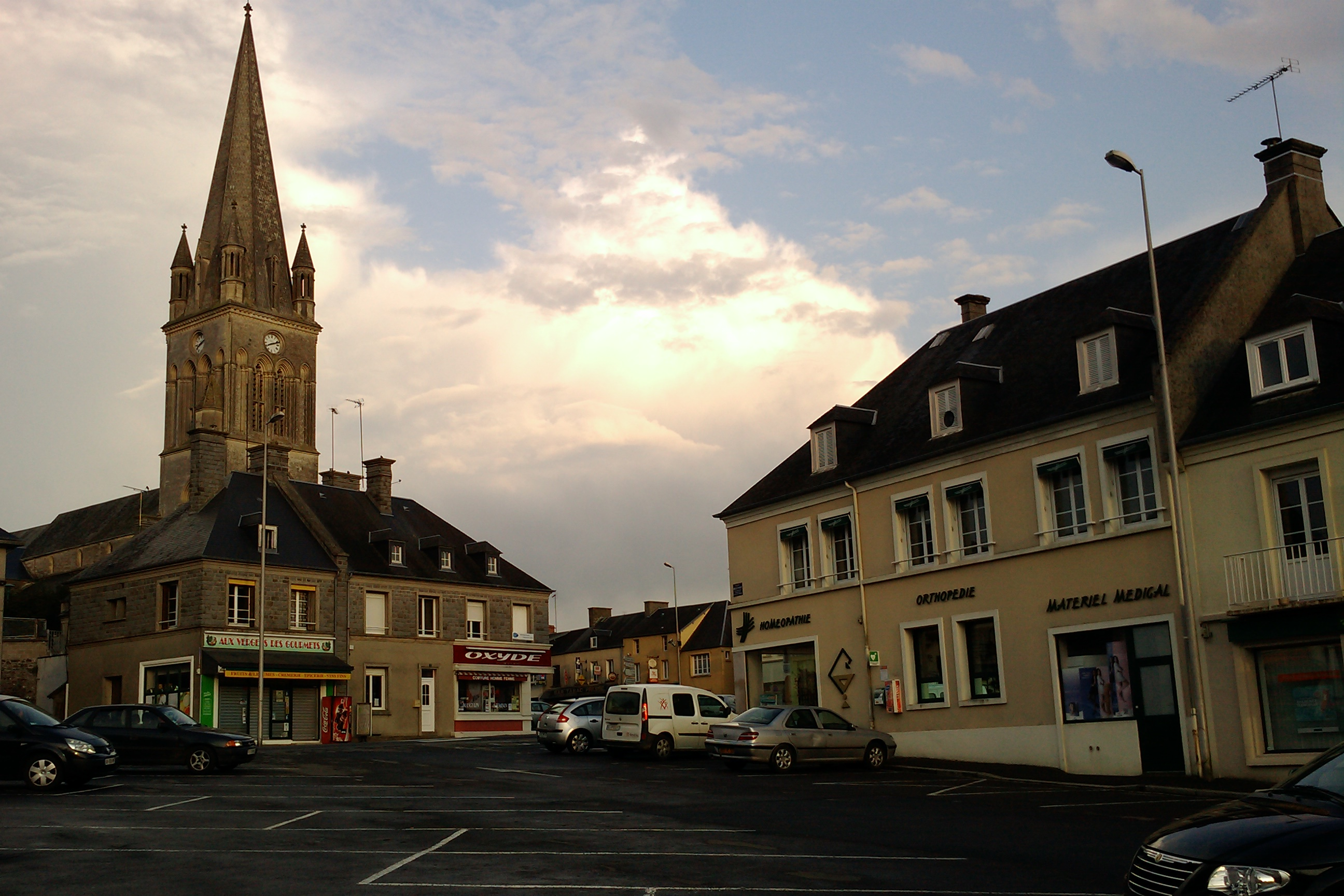
- Location of Marigny
- Location within France Location within Normandy
- Coordinates: 49°05′59″N 1°14′20″W
- Country: France
- Region: Normandy
- Department: Manche
- Arrondissement: Saint-Lô
- Canton: Saint-Lô-1
- Commune: Marigny-le-Lozon
- Area^{1}: 10.31 km^{2} (3.98 sq mi)
- Highest elevation: 112 m (367 ft)
- Lowest elevation: 32 m (105 ft)
- Population (2022): 2,428
  - Density: 235.5/km^{2} (609.9/sq mi)
- Time zone: UTC+01:00 (CET)
  - Summer (DST): UTC+02:00 (CEST)
- Postal code: 50570
- ^{1} French Land Register data, which excludes lakes, ponds, glaciers > 1 km^{2} (0.386 sq mi or 247 acres) and river estuaries.

Marigny is a former commune in the Manche department in Normandy in north-western France. On 1 January 2016, it was merged into the new commune of Marigny-le-Lozon.

== Heraldry ==
Arms of Marigny	The arms of Marigny are blazoned : Azure, a chevron between 2 roses and a lion Or.

== See also ==
- Communes of the Manche department
