= Remilly-sur-Lozon =

- Part of Remilly-les-Marais
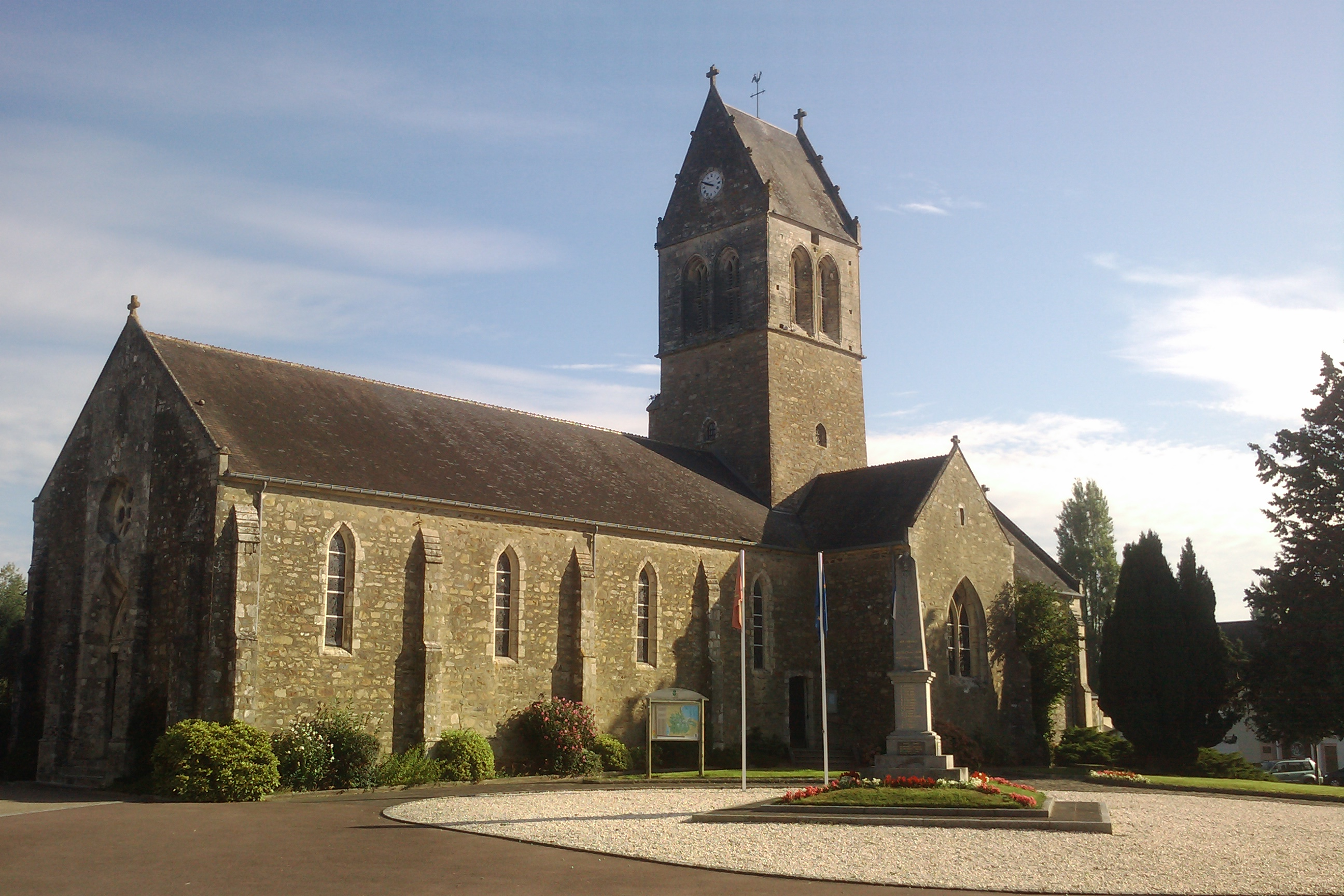
- The church of Saint-Martin
- Location of Remilly-sur-Lozon
- Location within France Location within Normandy
- Coordinates: 49°10′54″N 1°15′20″W
- Country: France
- Region: Normandy
- Department: Manche
- Arrondissement: Saint-Lô
- Canton: Saint-Lô-1
- Commune: Remilly-les-Marais
- Area^{1}: 9.56 km^{2} (3.69 sq mi)
- Elevation: 13 m (43 ft)
- Highest elevation: 45 m (148 ft)
- Lowest elevation: 1 m (3.3 ft)
- Population (2022): 647
  - Density: 67.7/km^{2} (175/sq mi)
- Demonym: Rémillais
- Time zone: UTC+01:00 (CET)
  - Summer (DST): UTC+02:00 (CEST)
- Postal code: 50570
- ^{1} French Land Register data, which excludes lakes, ponds, glaciers > 1 km^{2} (0.386 sq mi or 247 acres) and river estuaries.

Remilly-sur-Lozon (French pronunciation: [ʁəmiji syʁ lozɔ̃]) is a former commune in the Manche department in Normandy in north-western France. On 1 January 2017, it was merged into the new commune Remilly-les-Marais.

== Heraldry ==
Arms of Remilly-sur-Lozon	The arms of Remilly-sur-Lozon are blazoned : Barry Or and gules, semy of roundels counterchanged.

== See also ==
- Communes of the Manche department
