= Philippe Gosselin =

French lawyer and politician (born 1966)

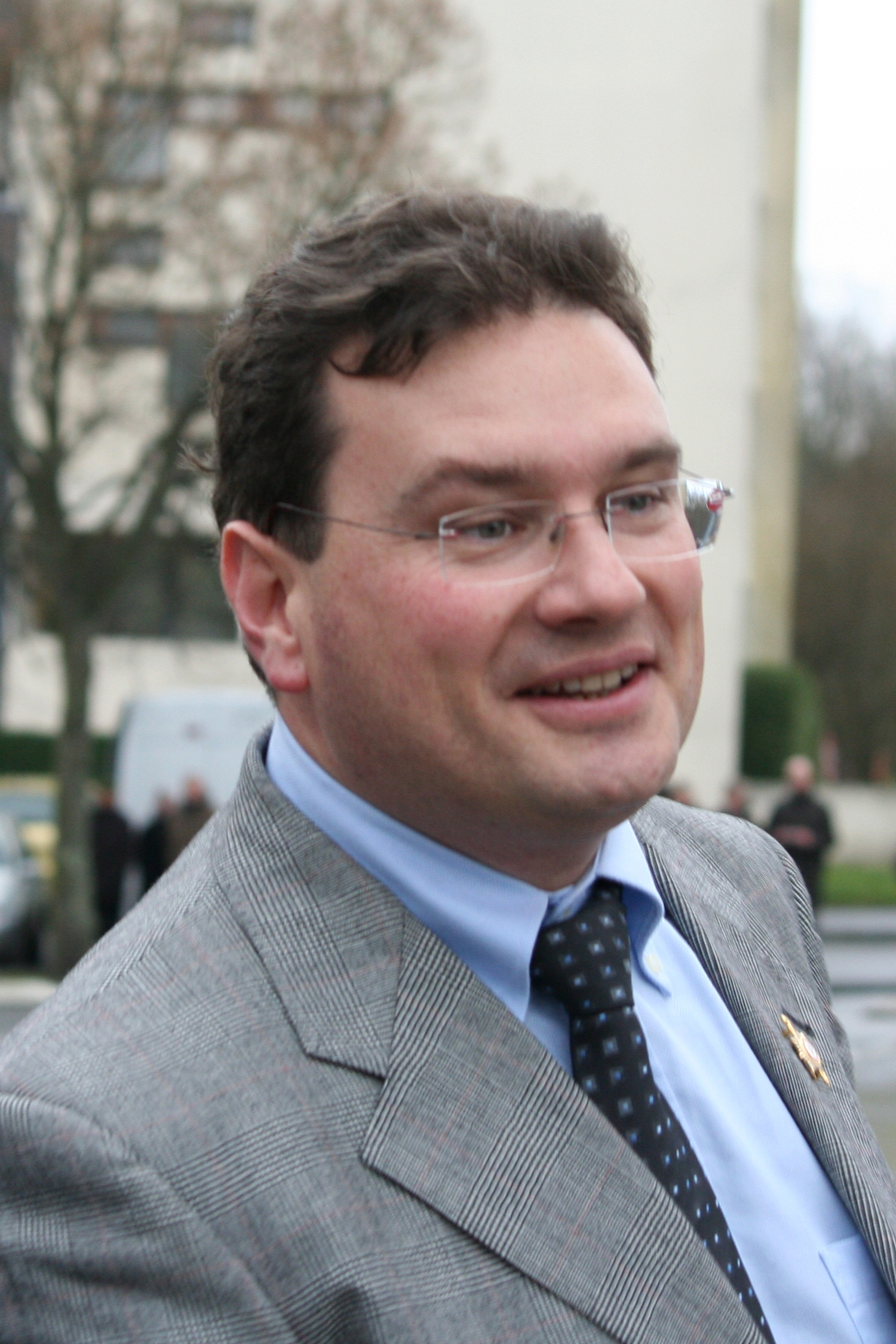

Member of the National Assembly for Manche's 1st constituency
- Incumbent
- Assumed office 17 June 2007
- Preceded by: Jean-Claude Lemoine

Personal details
- Born: 23 October 1966 (age 59) Carentan, France
- Party: The Republicans
- Education: Sciences Po

Philippe Gosselin (French pronunciation: [filip ɡɔslɛ̃]; born 23 October 1966) is a French lawyer and politician of The Republicans (LR) who has been serving as a member of the National Assembly of France since the 2007 elections, representing the Manche department.

== Political career ==
In parliament, Gosselin serves on the Committee on Legal Affairs. In addition to his committee assignments, he is a member of the French-South African Parliamentary Friendship Group and the French-Spanish Parliamentary Friendship Group. He is also part of the French delegation to the Franco-German Parliamentary Assembly.

Following Christian Jacob's election as LR chairman, Gosselin announced his candidacy to succeed him as leader of the party's parliamentary group. In an internal vote in November 2019, he eventually came in last out of six candidates; the position went to Damien Abad instead.

Since 2022, Gosselin has also been one of six National Assembly members who serve as judges of the Cour de Justice de la République (CJR).

== Political positions ==
In the Republicans’ 2016 presidential primaries, Gosselin endorsed Hervé Mariton as the party's candidate for the office of President of France. In the party's 2017 leadership election, he later supported Laurent Wauquiez.

In July 2019, Gosselin voted against the French ratification of the European Union’s Comprehensive Economic and Trade Agreement (CETA) with Canada.

In 2021, Gosselin opposed a bill to modify the first article of the constitution and add that France “guarantees the preservation of the environment and of biological diversity, and fights against climate change.”

Ahead of the Republicans’ 2022 convention, Gosselin endorsed Bruno Retailleau as the party’s chairman.
