= Thèreval =

- Commune
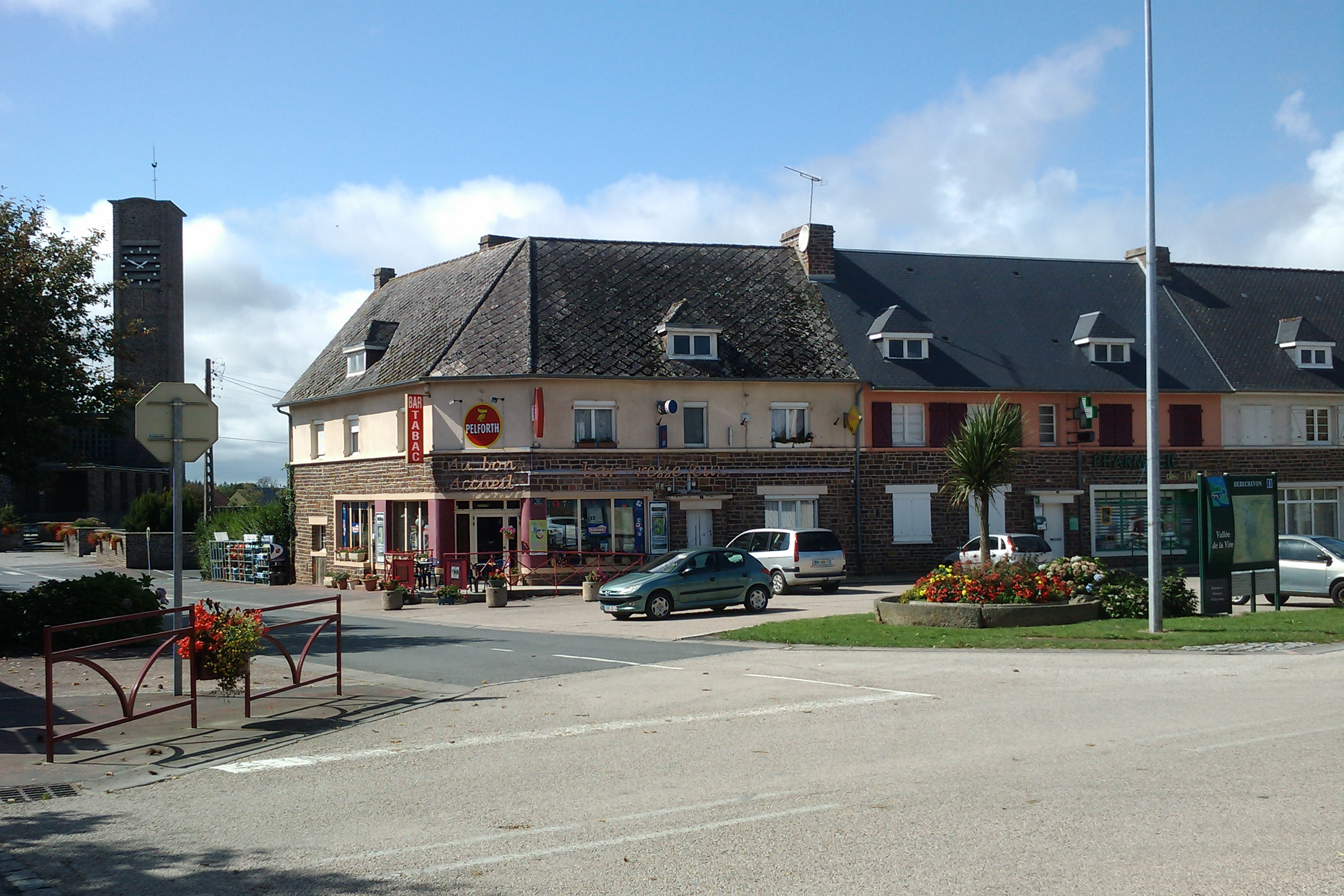
- The main square in Thèreval
- Location of Thèreval
- Location within France Location within Normandy
- Coordinates: 49°07′34″N 1°09′58″W
- Country: France
- Region: Normandy
- Department: Manche
- Arrondissement: Saint-Lô
- Canton: Saint-Lô-1
- Intercommunality: Saint-Lô Agglo

Government
  - Mayor (2020–2026): Gilles Quinquenel
- Area^{1}: 28.39 km^{2} (10.96 sq mi)
- Population (2023): 1,775
  - Density: 62.52/km^{2} (161.9/sq mi)
- Time zone: UTC+01:00 (CET)
  - Summer (DST): UTC+02:00 (CEST)
- INSEE/Postal code: 50239 /50180
- ^{1} French Land Register data, which excludes lakes, ponds, glaciers > 1 km^{2} (0.386 sq mi or 247 acres) and river estuaries.

Thèreval (French pronunciation: [tɛʁval]) is a commune in the department of Manche, northwestern France. The municipality was established on 1 January 2016 by merger of the former communes of Hébécrevon and La Chapelle-en-Juger.

== See also ==
- Communes of the Manche department
