= Le Mesnil-Amey =

- Commune
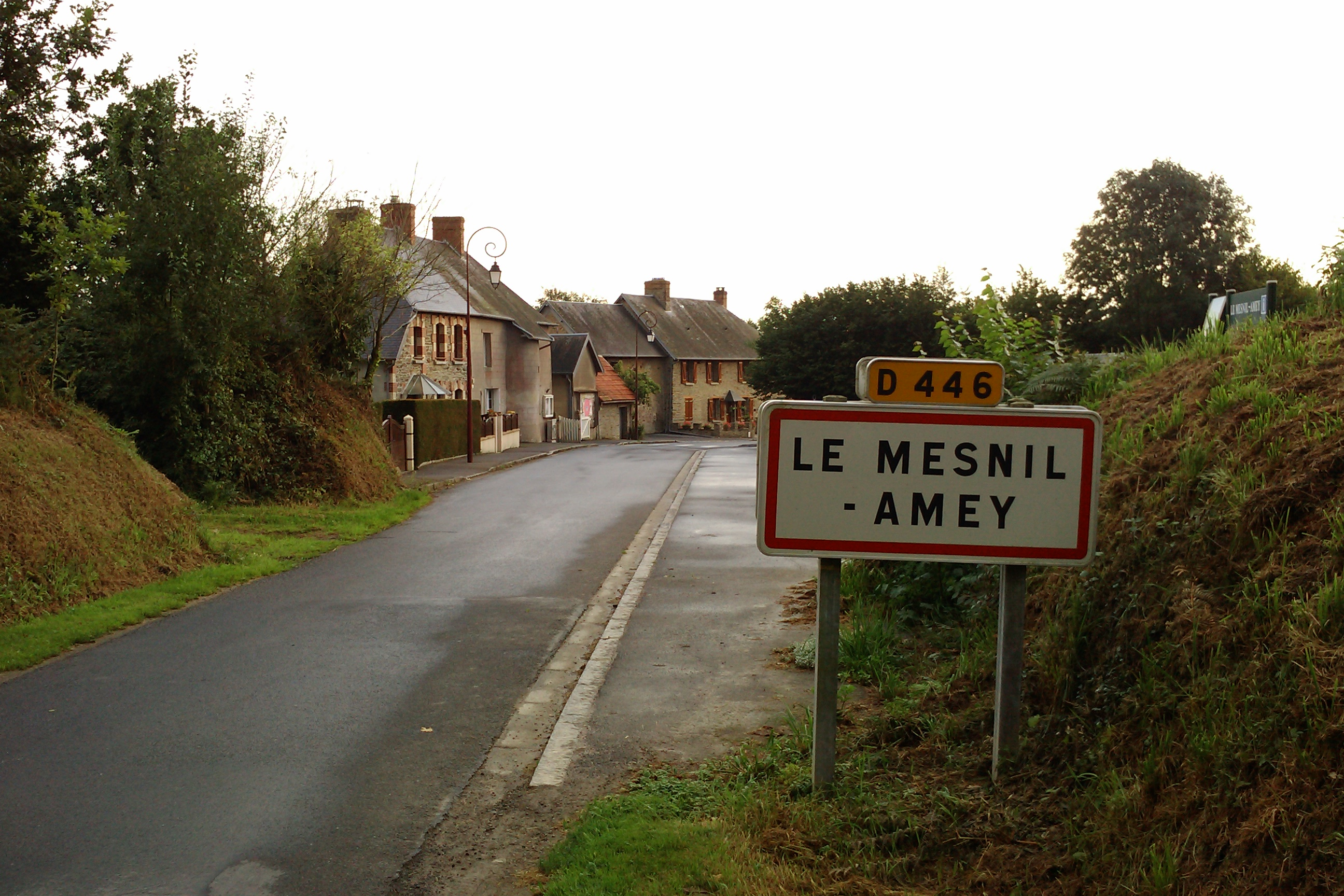
- The road into Le Mesnil-Amey
- Location of Le Mesnil-Amey
- Location within France Location within Normandy
- Coordinates: 49°06′17″N 1°12′38″W
- Country: France
- Region: Normandy
- Department: Manche
- Arrondissement: Saint-Lô
- Canton: Saint-Lô-1
- Intercommunality: Saint-Lô Agglo

Government
  - Mayor (2020–2026): Jacques Clairaux
- Area^{1}: 2.81 km^{2} (1.08 sq mi)
- Elevation: 93 m (305 ft)
- Highest elevation: 109 m (358 ft)
- Lowest elevation: 43 m (141 ft)
- Population (2023): 288
  - Density: 102/km^{2} (265/sq mi)
- Time zone: UTC+01:00 (CET)
  - Summer (DST): UTC+02:00 (CEST)
- INSEE/Postal code: 50302 /50570
- ^{1} French Land Register data, which excludes lakes, ponds, glaciers > 1 km^{2} (0.386 sq mi or 247 acres) and river estuaries.

Le Mesnil-Amey (French pronunciation: [lə mɛnil amɛ]) is a commune in the Manche department in Normandy in north-western France.

== See also ==
- Communes of the Manche department
