= Saint-Gilles, Manche =

Saint-Gilles
- Commune
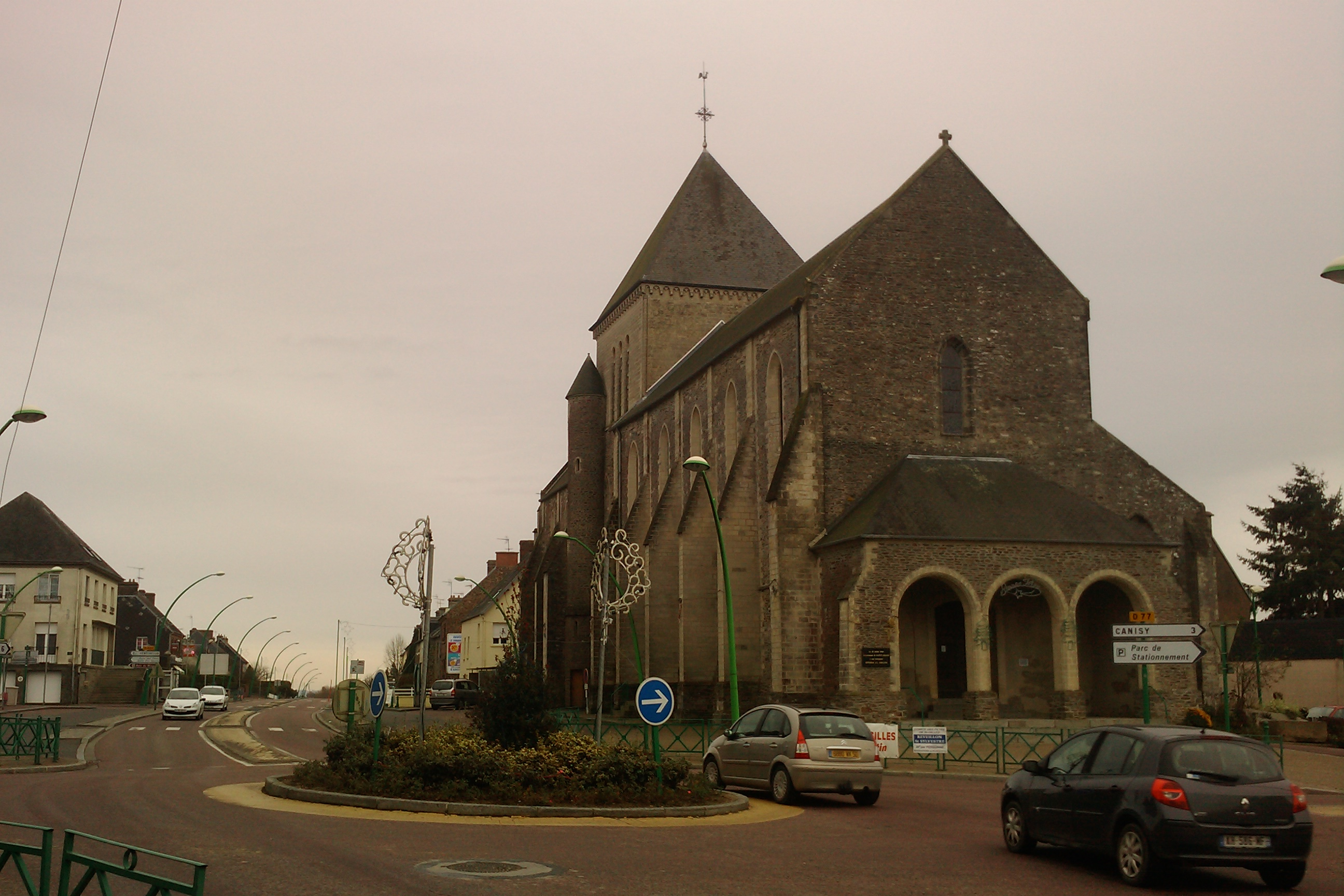
- The village and its church

- Coat of arms
- Location of Saint-Gilles
- Location within France Location within Normandy
- Coordinates: 49°06′20″N 1°10′27″W
- Country: France
- Region: Normandy
- Department: Manche
- Arrondissement: Saint-Lô
- Canton: Saint-Lô-1
- Intercommunality: Saint-Lô Agglo

Government
  - Mayor (2020–2026): Jean-Luc Lerouxel
- Area^{1}: 7.84 km^{2} (3.03 sq mi)
- Elevation: 101 m (331 ft)
- Highest elevation: 104 m (341 ft)
- Lowest elevation: 12 m (39 ft)
- Population (2023): 1,030
  - Density: 131/km^{2} (340/sq mi)
- Demonym: Saint-Gillais
- Time zone: UTC+01:00 (CET)
  - Summer (DST): UTC+02:00 (CEST)
- INSEE/Postal code: 50483 /50180
- ^{1} French Land Register data, which excludes lakes, ponds, glaciers > 1 km^{2} (0.386 sq mi or 247 acres) and river estuaries.

Saint-Gilles (French pronunciation: [sɛ̃ ʒil]) is a commune in the Manche department in Normandy in north-western France. In 1848 John Ruskin and his new wife, the former Effie Gray, visited St Gilles. Ruskin noted "The Church of Saint Giles has some remarkable examples of the final stage of transition from flamboyant to Renaissance".

== See also ==
- Communes of the Manche department
