= Montreuil-sur-Lozon =

- Commune
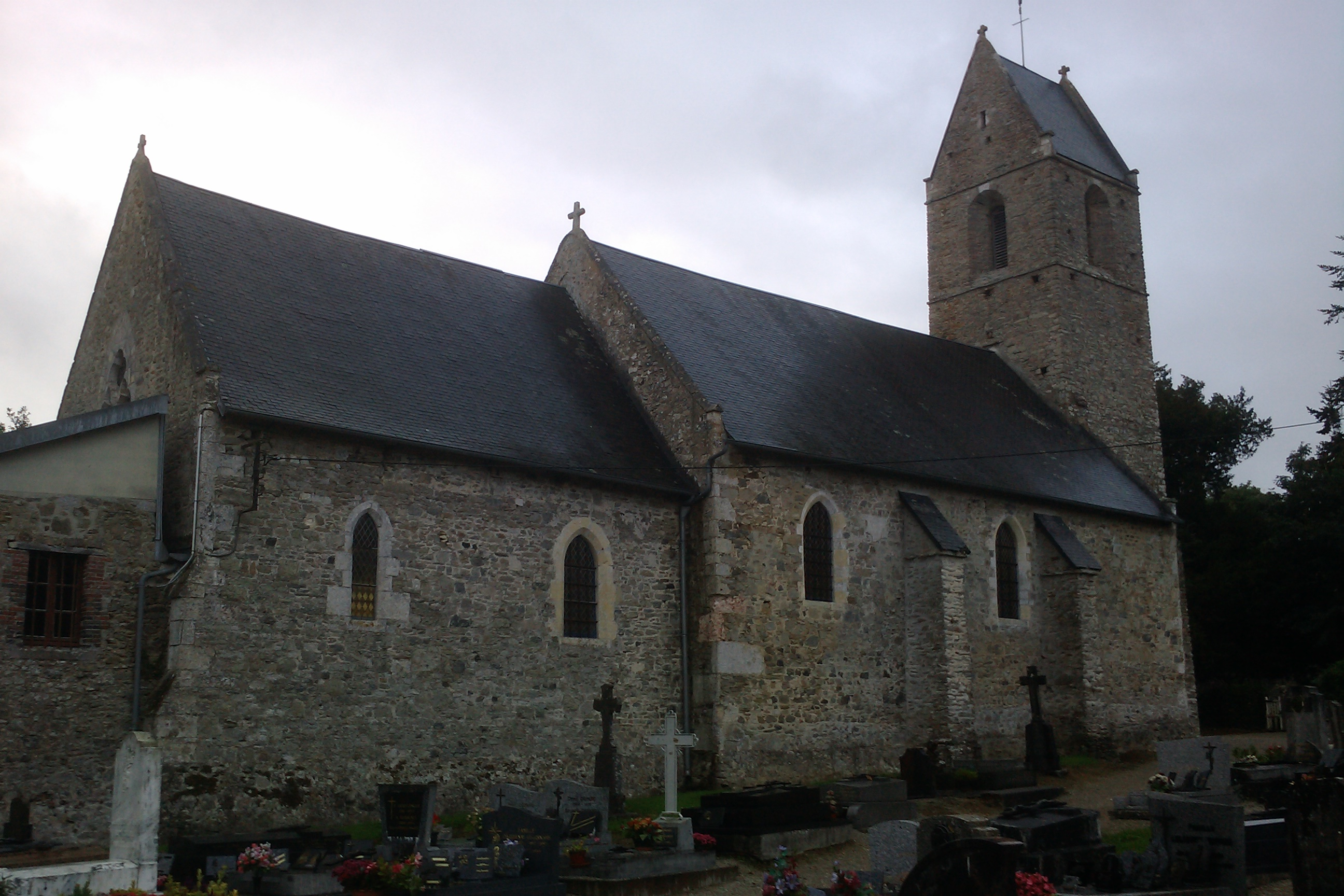
- The church

- Coat of arms
- Location of Montreuil-sur-Lozon
- Location within France Location within Normandy
- Coordinates: 49°08′17″N 1°14′09″W
- Country: France
- Region: Normandy
- Department: Manche
- Arrondissement: Saint-Lô
- Canton: Saint-Lô-1
- Intercommunality: Saint-Lô Agglo

Government
  - Mayor (2020–2026): Jean Auvray
- Area^{1}: 6.45 km^{2} (2.49 sq mi)
- Elevation: 44 m (144 ft)
- Highest elevation: 107 m (351 ft)
- Lowest elevation: 15 m (49 ft)
- Population (2023): 339
  - Density: 52.6/km^{2} (136/sq mi)
- Time zone: UTC+01:00 (CET)
  - Summer (DST): UTC+02:00 (CEST)
- INSEE/Postal code: 50352 /50570
- ^{1} French Land Register data, which excludes lakes, ponds, glaciers > 1 km^{2} (0.386 sq mi or 247 acres) and river estuaries.

Montreuil-sur-Lozon (French pronunciation: [mɔ̃tʁœj syʁ lɔzɔ̃], before 1962: Montreuil) is a commune in the Manche department in Normandy in north-western France.

== See also ==
- Communes of the Manche department
