= Les Champs-de-Losque =

- Part of Remilly-les-Marais
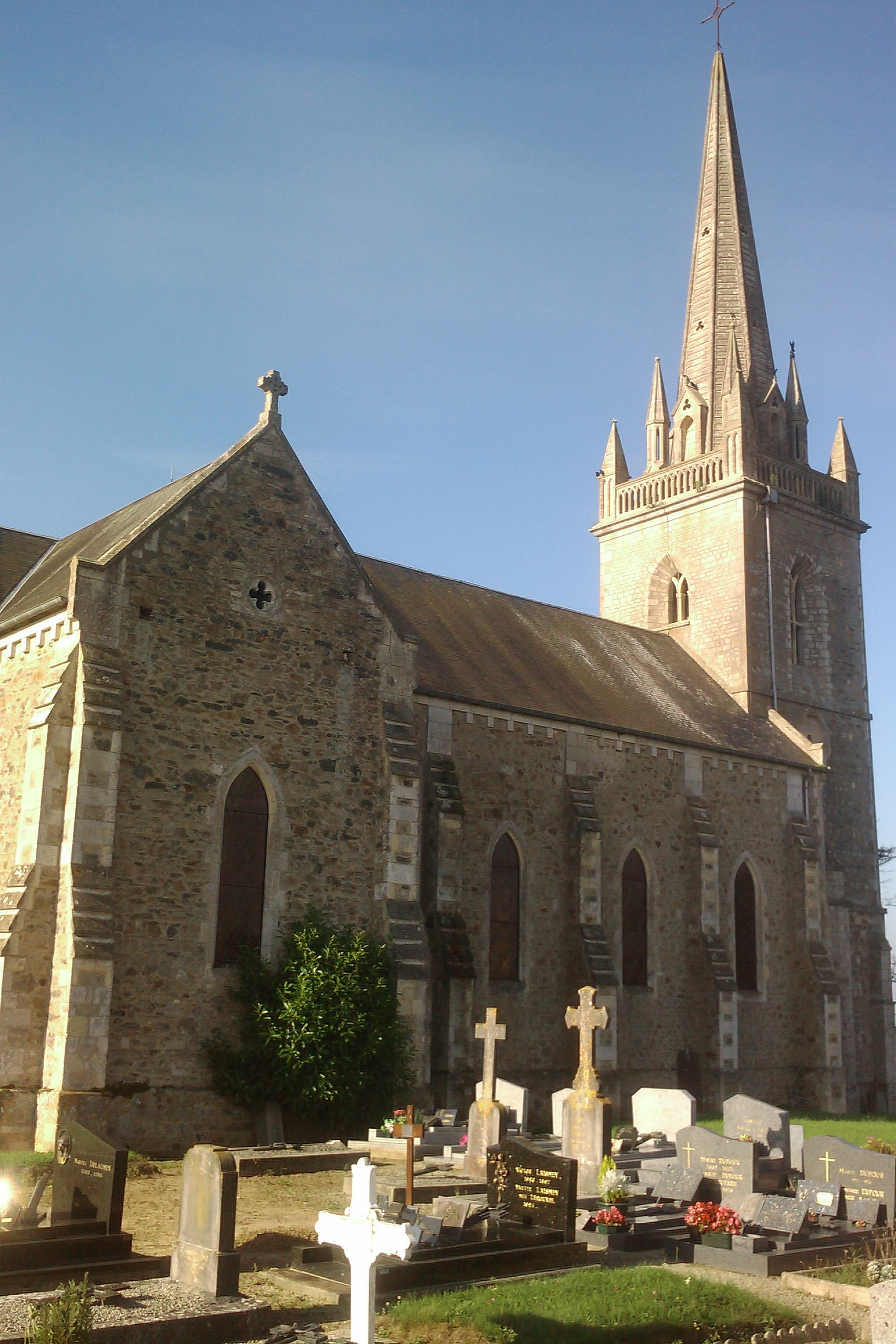
- Location of Les Champs-de-Losque
- Location within France Location within Normandy
- Coordinates: 49°11′01″N 1°13′48″W
- Country: France
- Region: Normandy
- Department: Manche
- Arrondissement: Saint-Lô
- Canton: Pont-Hébert
- Commune: Remilly-les-Marais
- Area^{1}: 9.31 km^{2} (3.59 sq mi)
- Elevation: 15 m (49 ft)
- Highest elevation: 35 m (115 ft)
- Lowest elevation: 0 m (0 ft)
- Population (2022): 197
  - Density: 21.2/km^{2} (54.8/sq mi)
- Time zone: UTC+01:00 (CET)
  - Summer (DST): UTC+02:00 (CEST)
- Postal code: 50620
- ^{1} French Land Register data, which excludes lakes, ponds, glaciers > 1 km^{2} (0.386 sq mi or 247 acres) and river estuaries.

Les Champs-de-Losque (French pronunciation: [le ʃɑ̃ də lok]) is a former commune in the Manche department in Normandy in north-western France. On 1 January 2017, it was merged into the new commune Remilly-les-Marais.

== See also ==
- Communes of the Manche department
