= Marigny-le-Lozon =

- Commune
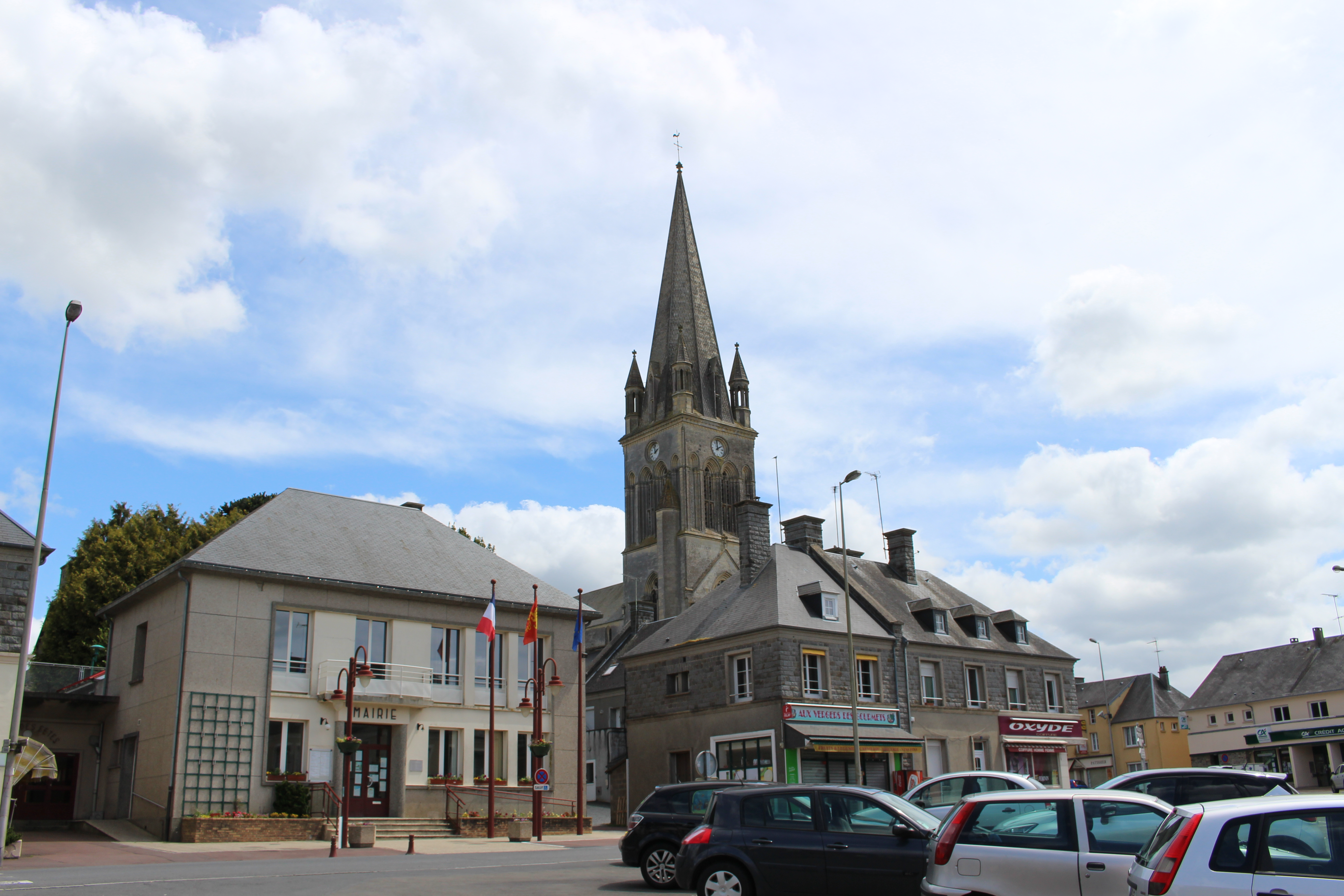
- The town hall and church in Marigny
- Location of Marigny-le-Lozon
- Location within France Location within Normandy
- Coordinates: 49°05′56″N 1°14′24″W
- Country: France
- Region: Normandy
- Department: Manche
- Arrondissement: Saint-Lô
- Canton: Saint-Lô-1
- Intercommunality: Saint-Lô Agglo

Government
  - Mayor (2020–2026): Fabrice Lemazurier
- Area^{1}: 19.17 km^{2} (7.40 sq mi)
- Population (2023): 2,761
  - Density: 144.0/km^{2} (373.0/sq mi)
- Time zone: UTC+01:00 (CET)
  - Summer (DST): UTC+02:00 (CEST)
- INSEE/Postal code: 50292 /50570
- ^{1} French Land Register data, which excludes lakes, ponds, glaciers > 1 km^{2} (0.386 sq mi or 247 acres) and river estuaries.

Marigny-le-Lozon (French pronunciation: [maʁiɲi lə lozɔ̃]) is a commune in the department of Manche, northwestern France. The municipality was established on 1 January 2016 through the merger of the former communes of Marigny and Lozon.

== Activities ==
The annual Duo Normand 54.3 km (33.7 mi) cycling time trial starts and finishes from Marigny.

== Population ==
Population data refer to the area corresponding with the commune as of January 2025.

Historical population
Year	Pop.	±% p.a.
1968	1,531	—
1975	1,547	+0.15%
1982	1,725	+1.57%
1990	1,960	+1.61%
1999	2,183	+1.20%
2007	2,395	+1.17%
2012	2,505	+0.90%
2017	2,645	+1.09%
2023	2,761	+0.72%
Source: INSEE

== Sister cities ==
Marigny-le-Lozon currently has one sister city:

- Westport, Connecticut, USA

== See also ==
- Communes of the Manche department
