= Canton of Saint-Lô-1 =

Coordinates: 49.11°N 1.10°W

The canton of Saint-Lô-1 is an administrative division of the Manche department, northwestern France. It was created at the French canton reorganisation which came into effect in March 2015. Its seat is in Saint-Lô.

It consists of the following communes:

1. Agneaux
2. Le Lorey
3. Marigny-le-Lozon
4. Le Mesnil-Amey
5. Le Mesnil-Eury
6. Montreuil-sur-Lozon
7. Remilly-les-Marais
8. Saint-Gilles
9. Saint-Lô (partly)
10. Thèreval
