= Champrepus =

- Commune
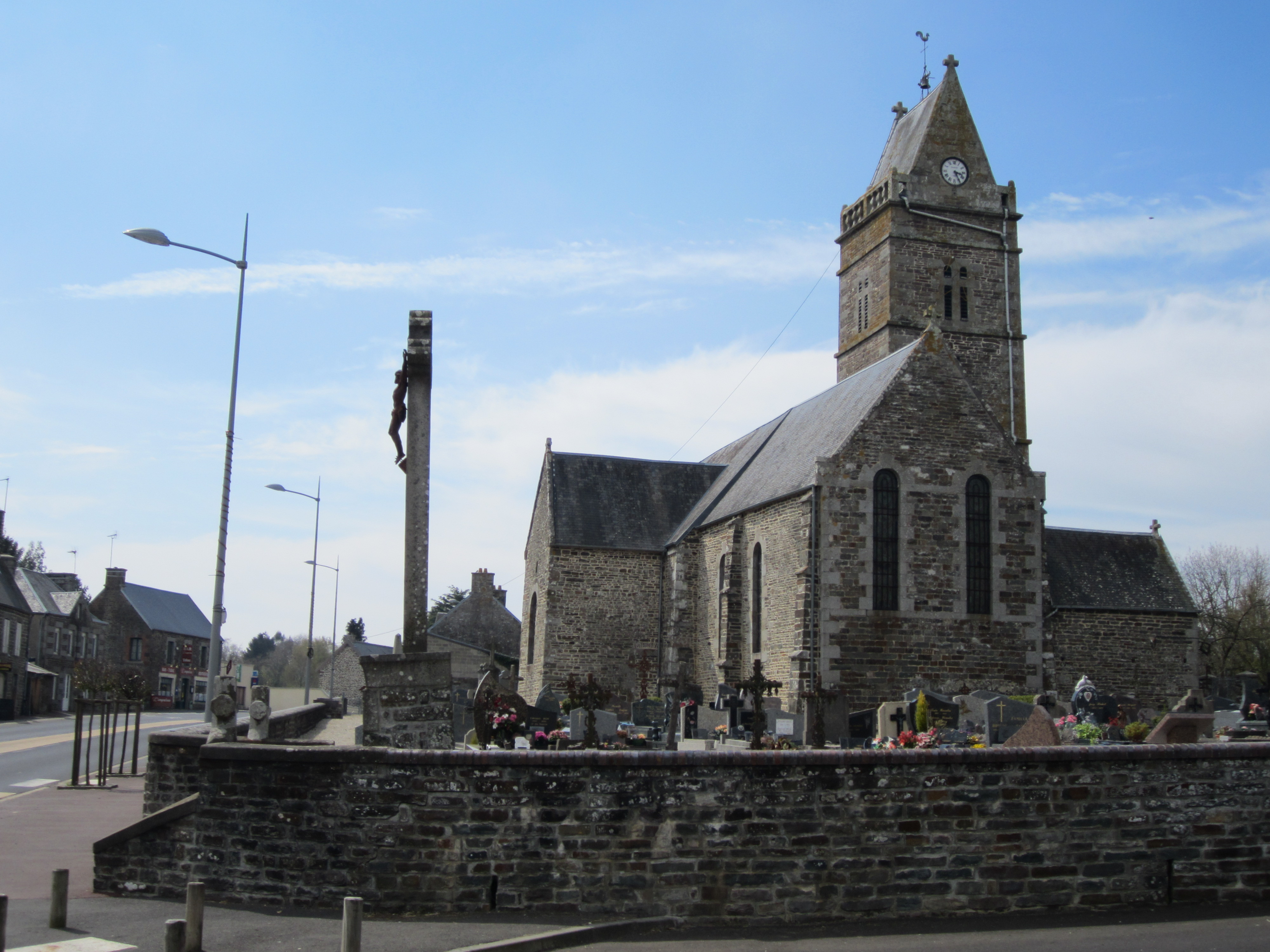
- The church of Saint-Jean-Baptiste
- Location of Champrepus
- Location within France Location within Normandy
- Coordinates: 48°50′05″N 1°19′12″W
- Country: France
- Region: Normandy
- Department: Manche
- Arrondissement: Saint-Lô
- Canton: Villedieu-les-Poêles-Rouffigny
- Intercommunality: Villedieu Intercom

Government
  - Mayor (2020–2026): Catherine Pepin
- Area^{1}: 9.12 km^{2} (3.52 sq mi)
- Highest elevation: 156 m (512 ft)
- Lowest elevation: 57 m (187 ft)
- Population (2023): 322
  - Density: 35.3/km^{2} (91.4/sq mi)
- Time zone: UTC+01:00 (CET)
  - Summer (DST): UTC+02:00 (CEST)
- INSEE/Postal code: 50118 /50800
- ^{1} French Land Register data, which excludes lakes, ponds, glaciers > 1 km^{2} (0.386 sq mi or 247 acres) and river estuaries.

Champrepus (French pronunciation: [ʃɑ̃pʁəpy]) is a commune in the Manche department in Normandy in north-western France.

== Points of interest ==
- Parc zoologique de Champrepus is a zoo covering 10 hectares that was established in 1957. The zoo has around 60 different species of animal.

== See also ==
- Communes of the Manche department
