= Parc zoologique de Champrepus =

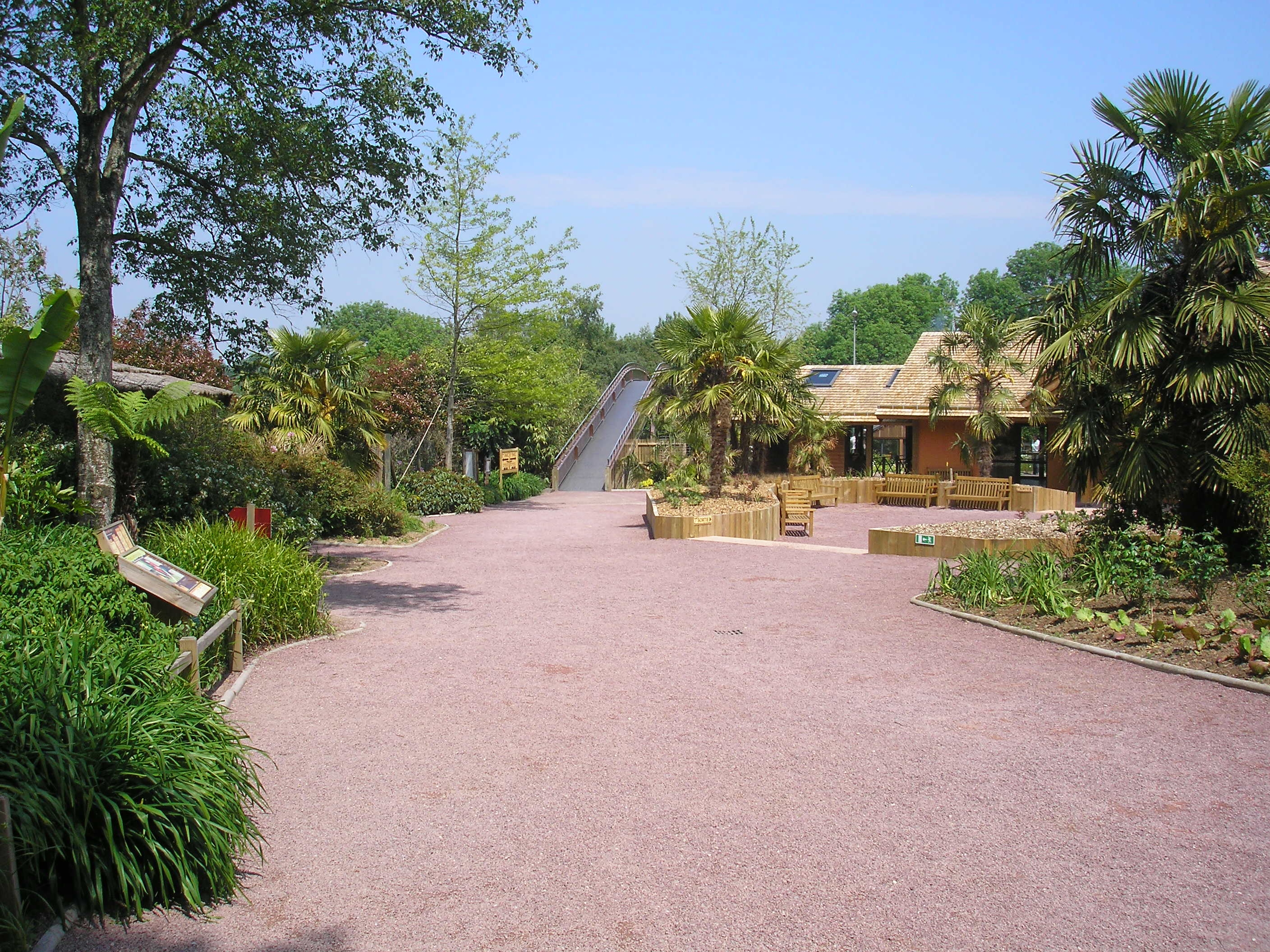
- Main reception area to the Parc
- Interactive map of Parc zoologique de Champrepus
- 48°50′2″N 1°19′27″W
- Date opened: 1957
- Location: Champrepus, France
- Land area: 10 hectares
- No. of animals: 460
- No. of species: 75
- Annual visitors: 111,000
- Owner: Yves and Jacques Lebreton
- Website: www.zoo-champrepus.com

Parc zoologique de Champrepus is a zoological park in the commune of Champrepus.

The park covers an area of 10 hectares (25 acres). It is home to about 460 animals, and features around 75 species.

The Park is open from February to October. It receives approximately 111,000 visitors per year.

== History ==
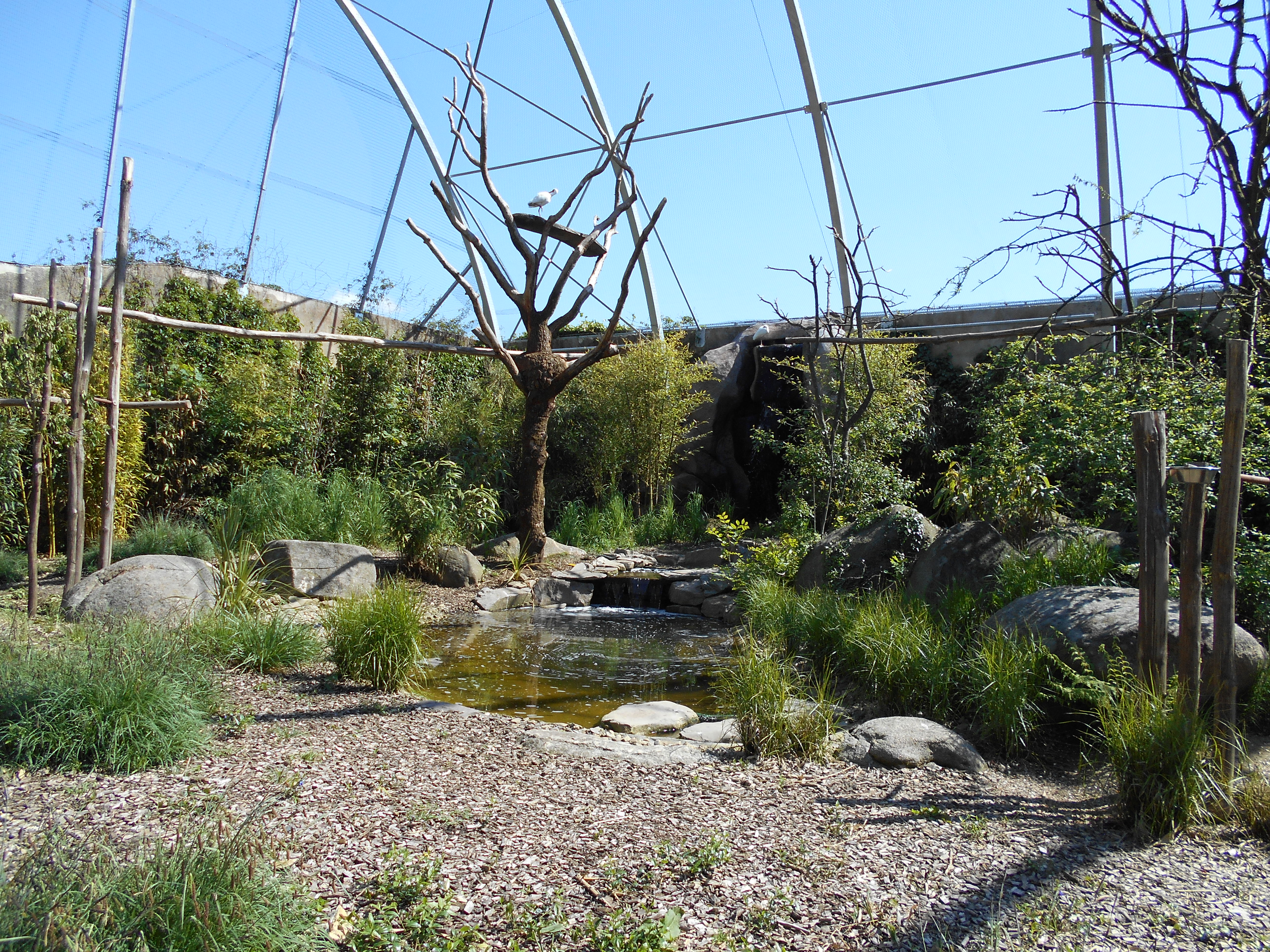
Zoo de champrépus - South American Aviary

The Park was opened in 1957 by Lucien Lebreton a farmer in Champrepus. He was an amateur collector and breeder of birds, such as partridges, pheasants, and with help from a friend, Paul Vautier, he increased his bird collection until he opened his aviaries to the public. Then over time added other animals.

Lucien died in 1977 and his daughter, Denise, took over running of the zoo for three years before handing it over 3 years later to her sons Yves and Jacques.

== Membership ==
The park is one of the members of The French Association of Zoological Parks (AFdPZ) and the European Association of Zoos and Aquaria EAZA.
