= Saint-Nicolas-des-Bois =

Saint-Nicolas-des-Bois may refer to the following communes in France:

- Saint-Nicolas-des-Bois, Manche, in the Manche département
- Saint-Nicolas-des-Bois, Orne, in the Orne département

== See also ==
- Saint-Nicolas-aux-Bois, in the Aisne département
