= Les Loges-sur-Brécey =

- Commune
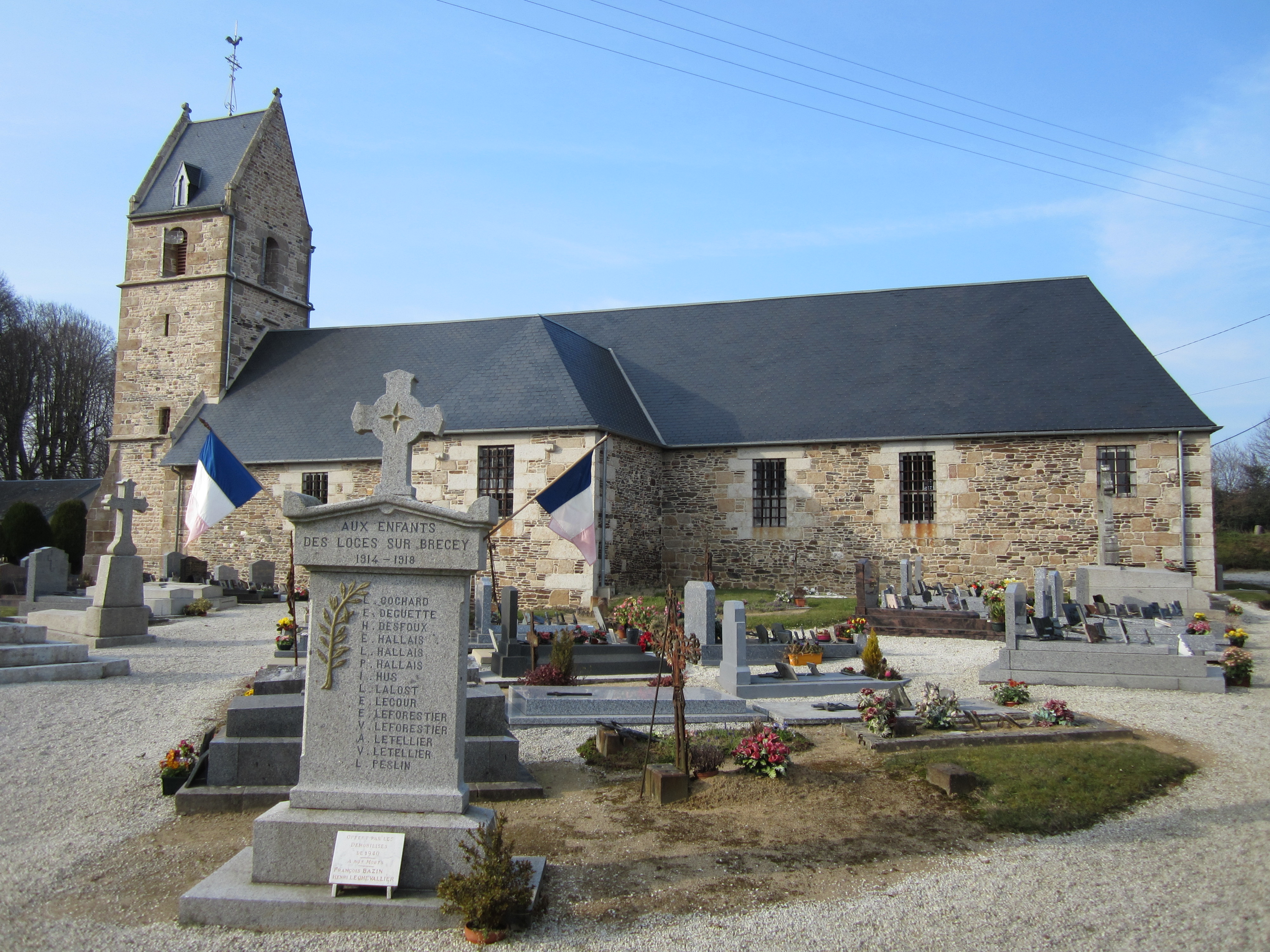
- The church of Saint-Pierre
- Location of Les Loges-sur-Brécey
- Location within France Location within Normandy
- Coordinates: 48°46′00″N 1°10′29″W
- Country: France
- Region: Normandy
- Department: Manche
- Arrondissement: Avranches
- Canton: Isigny-le-Buat
- Intercommunality: CA Mont-Saint-Michel-Normandie

Government
  - Mayor (2020–2026): Mikaël Berhault
- Area^{1}: 5.27 km^{2} (2.03 sq mi)
- Elevation: 150 m (490 ft)
- Highest elevation: 165 m (541 ft)
- Lowest elevation: 53 m (174 ft)
- Population (2023): 115
  - Density: 21.8/km^{2} (56.5/sq mi)
- Time zone: UTC+01:00 (CET)
  - Summer (DST): UTC+02:00 (CEST)
- INSEE/Postal code: 50275 /50370
- ^{1} French Land Register data, which excludes lakes, ponds, glaciers > 1 km^{2} (0.386 sq mi or 247 acres) and river estuaries.

Les Loges-sur-Brécey (French pronunciation: [le lɔʒ syʁ bʁesɛ], literally Les Loges on Brécey) is a commune in the Manche department in Normandy in north-western France.

A small, very rural commune some 5 km North of the small town of Brecey. With no centre to the commune other than the church, the 90 habitations (of which about 10% are holiday homes belonging to both French and British) are spread over a large geographical area. The majority of the population of approximately 150 are farming families, both retired and active. This is augmented by a small number of professional people, artisans and a very small number of English ex-pats.

== See also ==
- Communes of the Manche department
