= Isigny =

Isigny may refer to:

- Isigny-le-Buat, in the Manche département, France
- Isigny-sur-Mer, in the Calvados département, France
