= Saint-Georges-de-Livoye =

- Commune
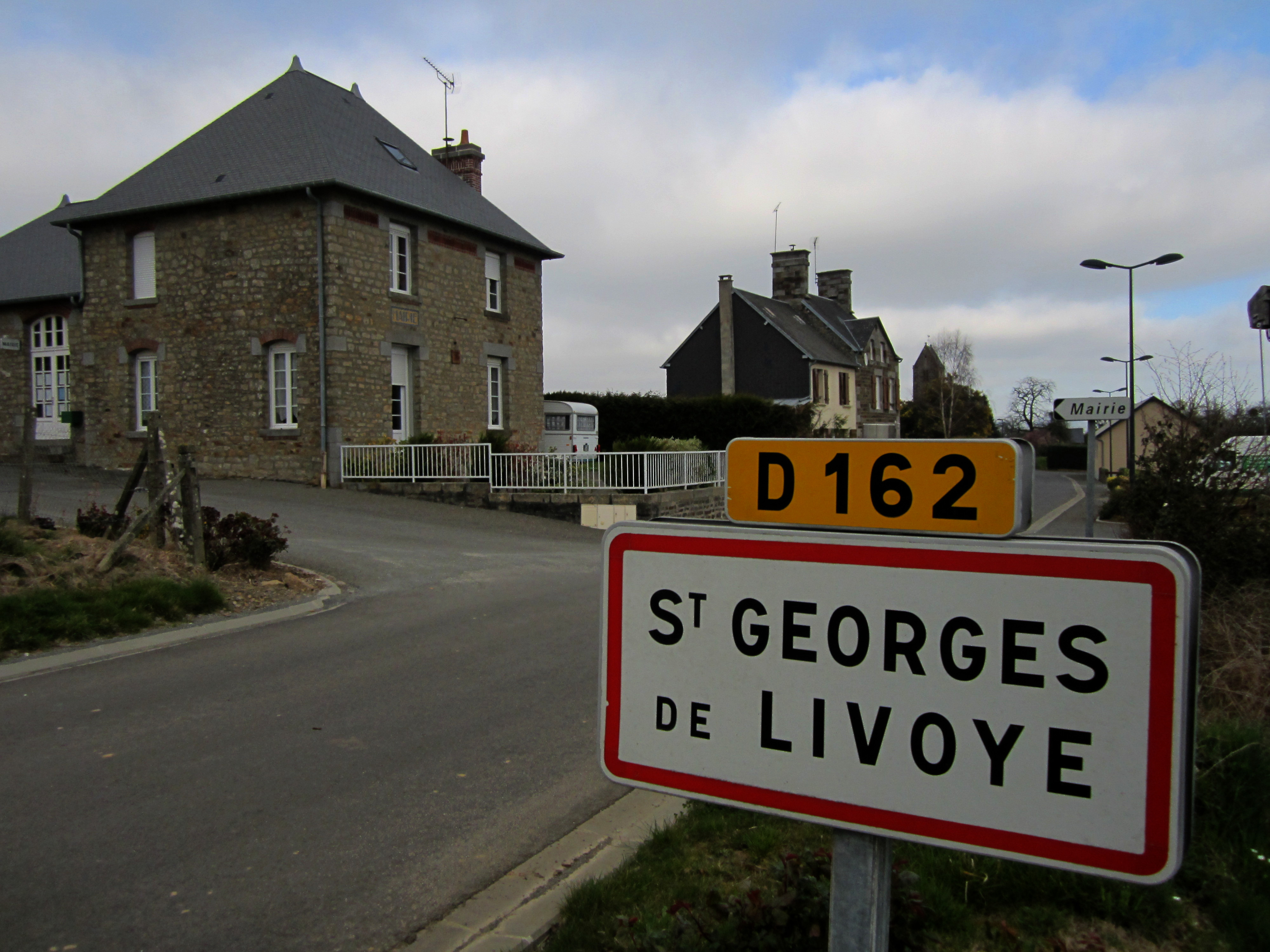
- Commune entrance and town hall
- Location of Saint-Georges-de-Livoye
- Location within France Location within Normandy
- Coordinates: 48°44′15″N 1°12′55″W
- Country: France
- Region: Normandy
- Department: Manche
- Arrondissement: Avranches
- Canton: Isigny-le-Buat
- Intercommunality: CA Mont-Saint-Michel-Normandie

Government
  - Mayor (2020–2026): Jean-Vital Hamard
- Area^{1}: 5.53 km^{2} (2.14 sq mi)
- Elevation: 80 m (260 ft)
- Highest elevation: 120 m (390 ft)
- Lowest elevation: 22 m (72 ft)
- Population (2023): 204
  - Density: 36.9/km^{2} (95.5/sq mi)
- Time zone: UTC+01:00 (CET)
  - Summer (DST): UTC+02:00 (CEST)
- INSEE/Postal code: 50472 /50370
- ^{1} French Land Register data, which excludes lakes, ponds, glaciers > 1 km^{2} (0.386 sq mi or 247 acres) and river estuaries.

Saint-Georges-de-Livoye (French pronunciation: [sɛ̃ ʒɔʁʒ də livwa]) is a commune in the Manche department in Normandy in north-western France.

== See also ==
- Communes of the Manche department

== Places and monuments ==
- Saint-Georges Church from 17th century. It contains a statue of Mary Magdalene from the 14th or 15th century classified as an object to the Monument Historique.
- Ponds of the Val de Sée, in the Mill, the water of fishing pond comes from the Bieu, tributary of the Sée, and picnic place.
