= Saint-Laurent-de-Cuves =

- Commune
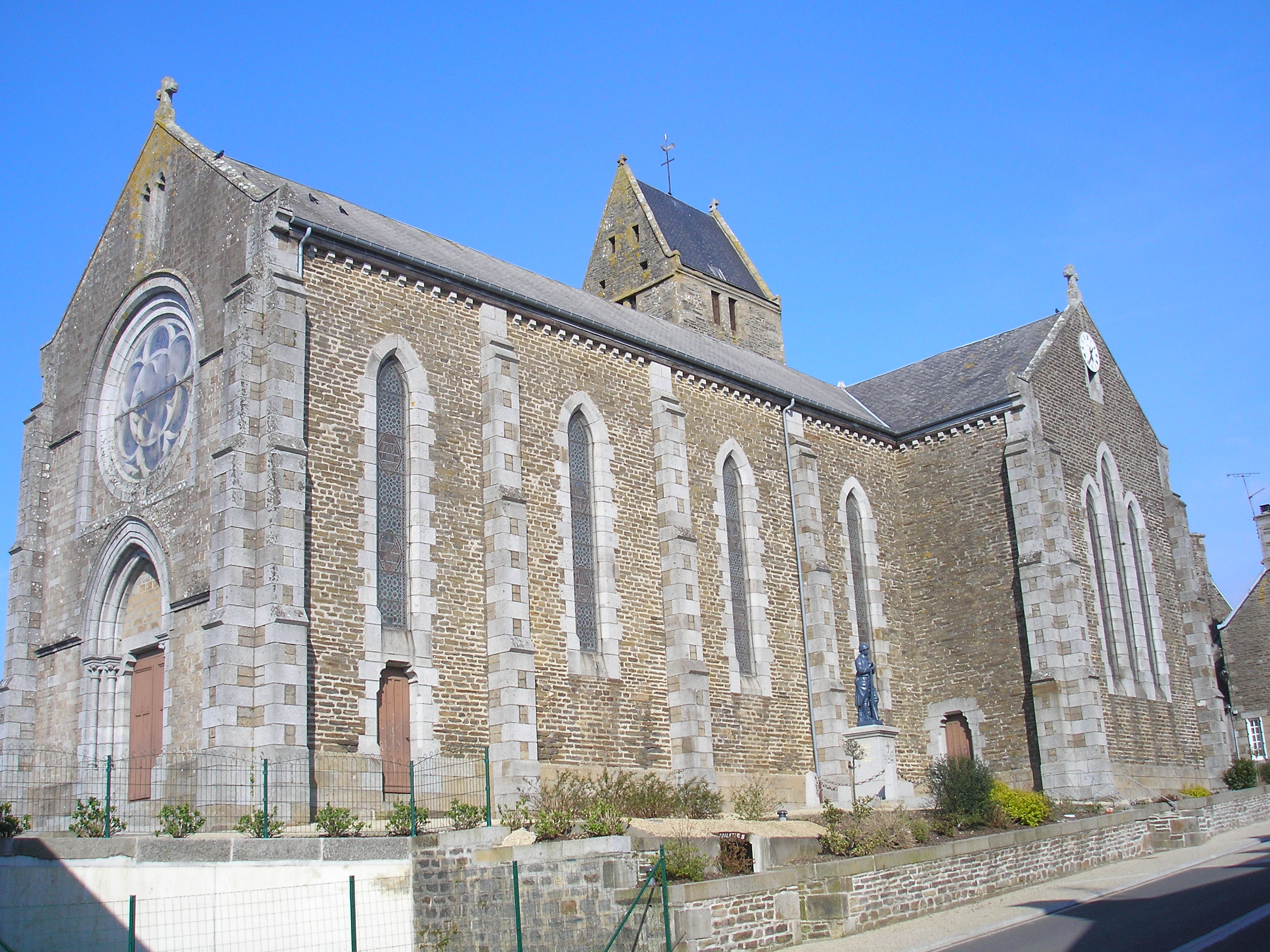
- The church of Saint-Laurent
- Location of Saint-Laurent-de-Cuves
- Location within France Location within Normandy
- Coordinates: 48°45′08″N 1°07′18″W
- Country: France
- Region: Normandy
- Department: Manche
- Arrondissement: Avranches
- Canton: Isigny-le-Buat
- Intercommunality: CA Mont-Saint-Michel-Normandie

Government
  - Mayor (2020–2026): Franck Esnouf
- Area^{1}: 14.8 km^{2} (5.7 sq mi)
- Elevation: 93 m (305 ft)
- Highest elevation: 226 m (741 ft)
- Lowest elevation: 32 m (105 ft)
- Population (2023): 496
  - Density: 33.5/km^{2} (86.8/sq mi)
- Time zone: UTC+01:00 (CET)
  - Summer (DST): UTC+02:00 (CEST)
- INSEE/Postal code: 50499 /50670
- ^{1} French Land Register data, which excludes lakes, ponds, glaciers > 1 km^{2} (0.386 sq mi or 247 acres) and river estuaries.

Saint-Laurent-de-Cuves (French pronunciation: [sɛ̃ loʁɑ̃ də kyv], literally Saint-Laurent of Cuves) is a commune in the Manche department in Normandy in north-western France.

It hosts the annual rock music festival "Papillons de Nuit". The 2008 festival had approximately 50,000 spectators over three days. Acts included Stereophonics, Camille, Babyshambles, Yael Naïm, and The Hives.

== See also ==
- Communes of the Manche department
