= Arrondissement of Avranches =

Coordinates: 48°41′05″N 1°21′44″W

Avranches
- Arrondissement
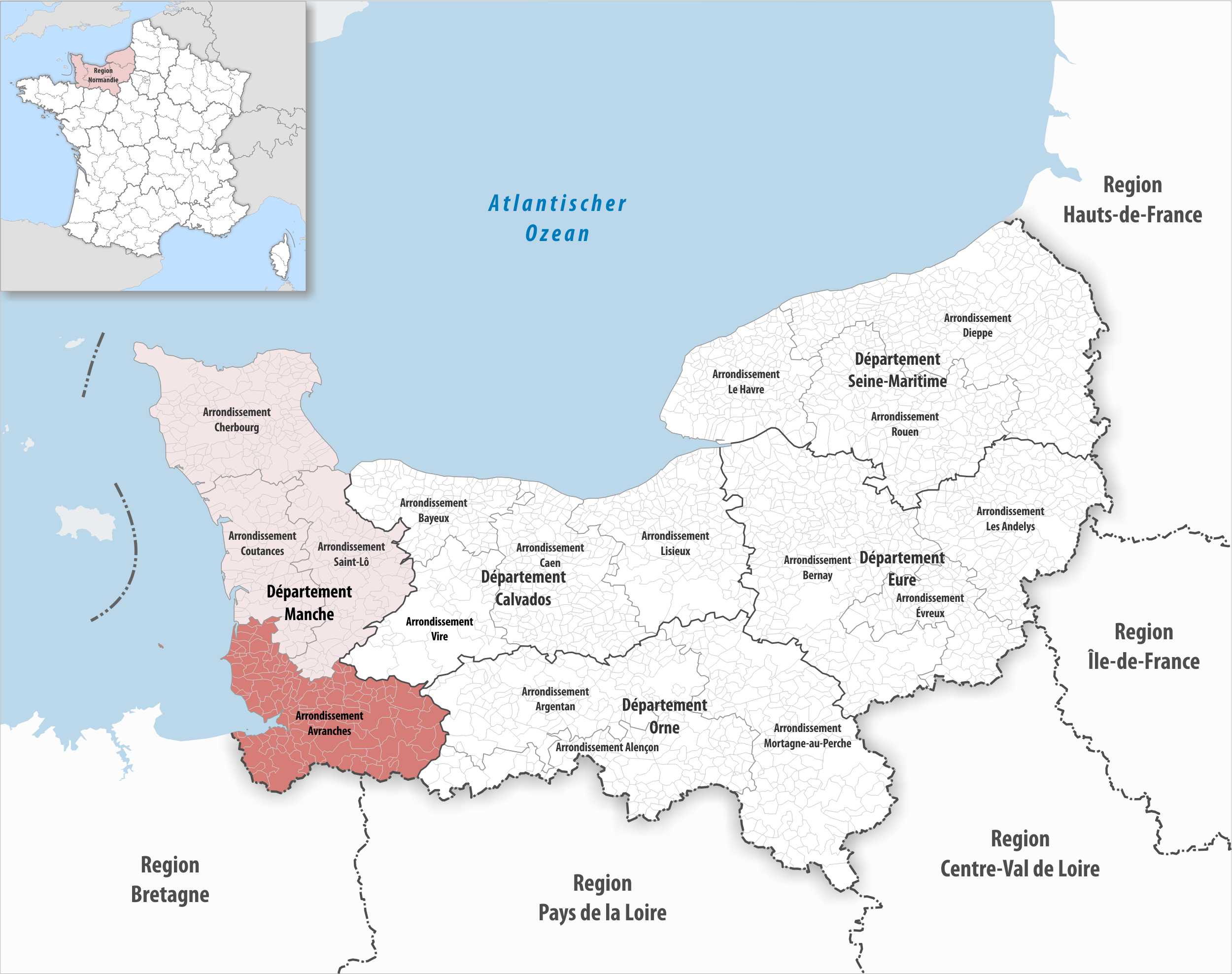
- Location within the region Normandy
- Country: France
- Region: Normandy
- Department: Manche
- No. of communes: {{{nbcomm}}}
- Area: 1,888.2 km^{2} (729.0 sq mi)
- Population (2023): 135,050
  - Density: 71.523/km^{2} (185.24/sq mi)
- INSEE code: 501

The arrondissement of Avranches is an arrondissement of France in the Manche department in the Normandy region. It has 134 communes. Its population is 134,499 (2021), and its area is 1,888.2 km^{2} (729.0 sq mi).

== Composition ==
The communes of the arrondissement of Avranches, and their INSEE codes, are:

1. Anctoville-sur-Boscq (50008)
2. Aucey-la-Plaine (50019)
3. Avranches (50025)
4. Bacilly (50027)
5. Barenton (50029)
6. Beauchamps (50038)
7. Beauficel (50040)
8. Beauvoir (50042)
9. Boisyvon (50062)
10. Brécey (50074)
11. Bréhal (50076)
12. Bréville-sur-Mer (50081)
13. Bricqueville-sur-Mer (50085)
14. Brouains (50088)
15. Buais-les-Monts (50090)
16. Carolles (50102)
17. Céaux (50108)
18. Cérences (50109)
19. La Chaise-Baudouin (50112)
20. Champeaux (50117)
21. Chanteloup (50120)
22. La Chapelle-Cécelin (50121)
23. La Chapelle-Urée (50124)
24. Chaulieu (50514)
25. Chavoy (50126)
26. Coudeville-sur-Mer (50143)
27. Coulouvray-Boisbenâtre (50144)
28. Courtils (50146)
29. Les Cresnays (50152)
30. Crollon (50155)
31. Cuves (50158)
32. Donville-les-Bains (50165)
33. Dragey-Ronthon (50167)
34. Ducey-Les Chéris (50168)
35. Équilly (50174)
36. Folligny (50188)
37. Le Fresne-Poret (50193)
38. Gathemo (50195)
39. Genêts (50199)
40. Ger (50200)
41. La Godefroy (50205)
42. Le Grand-Celland (50217)
43. Grandparigny (50391)
44. Granville (50218)
45. Le Grippon (50115)
46. Hamelin (50229)
47. La Haye-Pesnel (50237)
48. Hocquigny (50247)
49. Hudimesnil (50252)
50. Huisnes-sur-Mer (50253)
51. Isigny-le-Buat (50256)
52. Juilley (50259)
53. Jullouville (50066)
54. Juvigny les Vallées (50260)
55. Lapenty (50263)
56. Lingeard (50271)
57. Les Loges-Marchis (50274)
58. Les Loges-sur-Brécey (50275)
59. Lolif (50276)
60. Longueville (50277)
61. Le Loreur (50278)
62. La Lucerne-d'Outremer (50281)
63. Le Luot (50282)
64. Marcey-les-Grèves (50288)
65. Marcilly (50290)
66. Le Mesnil-Adelée (50300)
67. Le Mesnil-Aubert (50304)
68. Le Mesnil-Gilbert (50312)
69. Le Mesnillard (50315)
70. Le Mesnil-Ozenne (50317)
71. La Meurdraquière (50327)
72. Montjoie-Saint-Martin (50347)
73. Le Mont-Saint-Michel (50353)
74. Mortain-Bocage (50359)
75. La Mouche (50361)
76. Moulines (50362)
77. Muneville-sur-Mer (50365)
78. Le Neufbourg (50371)
79. Notre-Dame-de-Livoye (50379)
80. Le Parc (50535)
81. Perriers-en-Beauficel (50397)
82. Le Petit-Celland (50399)
83. Poilley (50407)
84. Pontaubault (50408)
85. Pontorson (50410)
86. Ponts (50411)
87. Précey (50413)
88. Reffuveille (50428)
89. Romagny-Fontenay (50436)
90. Sacey (50443)
91. Saint-Aubin-des-Préaux (50447)
92. Saint-Aubin-de-Terregatte (50448)
93. Saint-Barthélemy (50450)
94. Saint-Brice (50451)
95. Saint-Brice-de-Landelles (50452)
96. Saint-Clément-Rancoudray (50456)
97. Saint-Cyr-du-Bailleul (50462)
98. Saint-Georges-de-Livoye (50472)
99. Saint-Georges-de-Rouelley (50474)
100. Saint-Hilaire-du-Harcouët (50484)
101. Saint-James (50487)
102. Saint-Jean-de-la-Haize (50489)
103. Saint-Jean-des-Champs (50493)
104. Saint-Jean-du-Corail-des-Bois (50495)
105. Saint-Jean-le-Thomas (50496)
106. Saint-Laurent-de-Cuves (50499)
107. Saint-Laurent-de-Terregatte (50500)
108. Saint-Loup (50505)
109. Saint-Martin-le-Bouillant (50518)
110. Saint-Maur-des-Bois (50521)
111. Saint-Michel-de-Montjoie (50525)
112. Saint-Nicolas-des-Bois (50529)
113. Saint-Ovin (50531)
114. Saint-Pair-sur-Mer (50532)
115. Saint-Pierre-Langers (50540)
116. Saint-Planchers (50541)
117. Saint-Pois (50542)
118. Saint-Quentin-sur-le-Homme (50543)
119. Saint-Sauveur-la-Pommeraye (50549)
120. Saint-Senier-de-Beuvron (50553)
121. Saint-Senier-sous-Avranches (50554)
122. Sartilly-Baie-Bocage (50565)
123. Savigny-le-Vieux (50570)
124. Servon (50574)
125. Sourdeval (50582)
126. Subligny (50584)
127. Tanis (50589)
128. Le Tanu (50590)
129. Le Teilleul (50591)
130. Tirepied-sur-Sée (50597)
131. Vains (50612)
132. Le Val-Saint-Père (50616)
133. Vernix (50628)
134. Yquelon (50647)

== History ==
The arrondissement of Avranches was created in 1800. At the January 2017 reorganisation of the arrondissements of Manche, it gained 14 communes from the arrondissement of Coutances.

As a result of the reorganisation of the cantons of France which came into effect in 2015, the borders of the cantons are no longer related to the borders of the arrondissements. The cantons of the arrondissement of Avranches were, as of January 2015:

1. Avranches
2. Barenton
3. Brécey
4. Ducey
5. Granville
6. La Haye-Pesnel
7. Isigny-le-Buat
8. Juvigny-le-Tertre
9. Mortain
10. Pontorson
11. Saint-Hilaire-du-Harcouët
12. Saint-James
13. Saint-Pois
14. Sartilly
15. Sourdeval
16. Le Teilleul
