= Saint-Michel-de-Montjoie =

- Commune
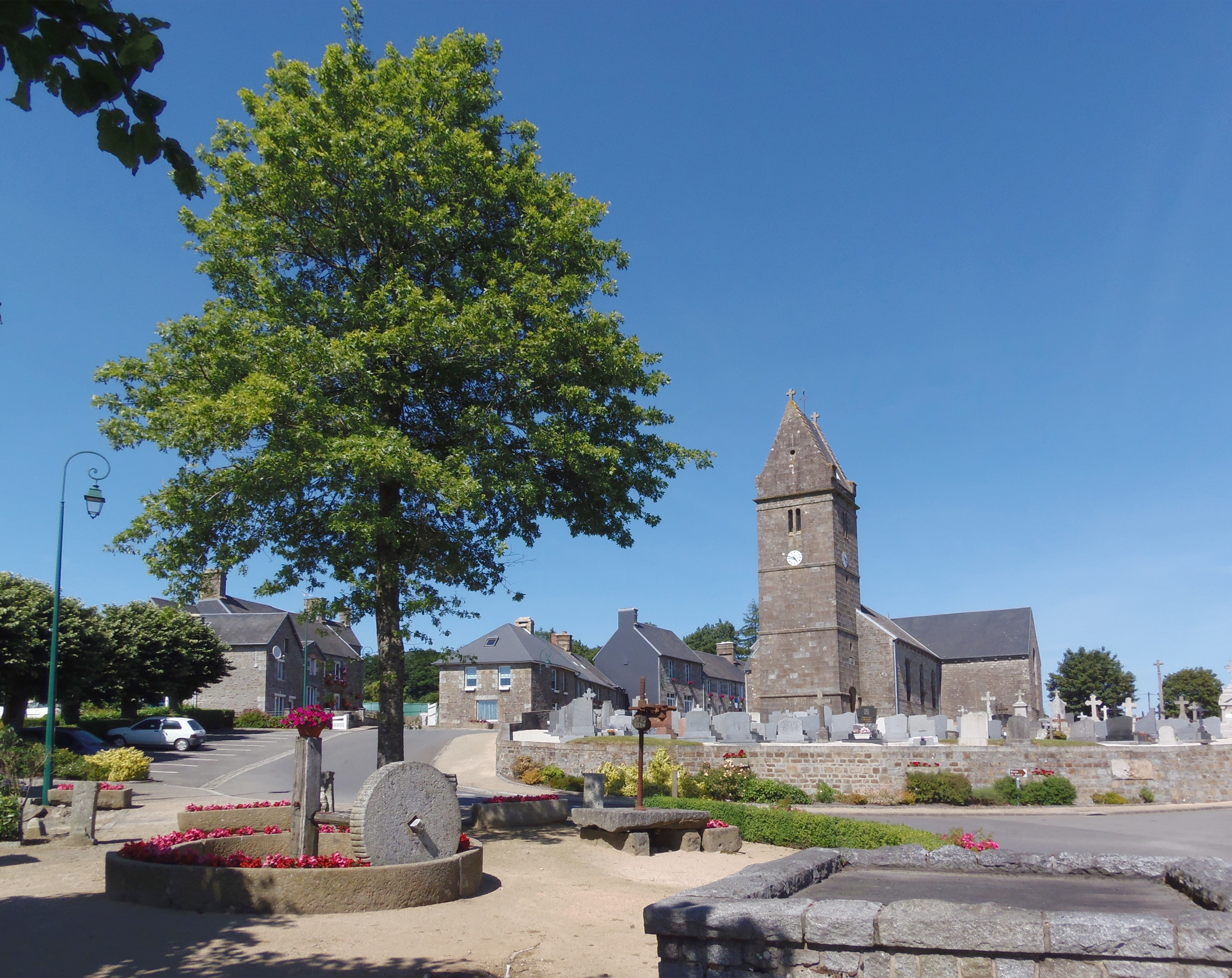
- The church and surroundings in Saint-Michel-de-Montjoie

- Coat of arms
- Location of Saint-Michel-de-Montjoie
- Location within France Location within Normandy
- Coordinates: 48°45′50″N 1°01′34″W
- Country: France
- Region: Normandy
- Department: Manche
- Arrondissement: Avranches
- Canton: Isigny-le-Buat
- Intercommunality: CA Mont-Saint-Michel-Normandie

Government
  - Mayor (2020–2026): Jocelyne Ozenne
- Area^{1}: 14.46 km^{2} (5.58 sq mi)
- Elevation: 333 m (1,093 ft)
- Highest elevation: 358 m (1,175 ft)
- Lowest elevation: 185 m (607 ft)
- Population (2023): 342
  - Density: 23.7/km^{2} (61.3/sq mi)
- Time zone: UTC+01:00 (CET)
  - Summer (DST): UTC+02:00 (CEST)
- INSEE/Postal code: 50525 /50670
- ^{1} French Land Register data, which excludes lakes, ponds, glaciers > 1 km^{2} (0.386 sq mi or 247 acres) and river estuaries.

Saint-Michel-de-Montjoie (French pronunciation: [sɛ̃ miʃɛl də mɔ̃ʒwa]) is a commune in the Manche department in Normandy in north-western France.

== See also ==
- Communes of the Manche department
