= Le Mesnil-Gilbert =

- Commune
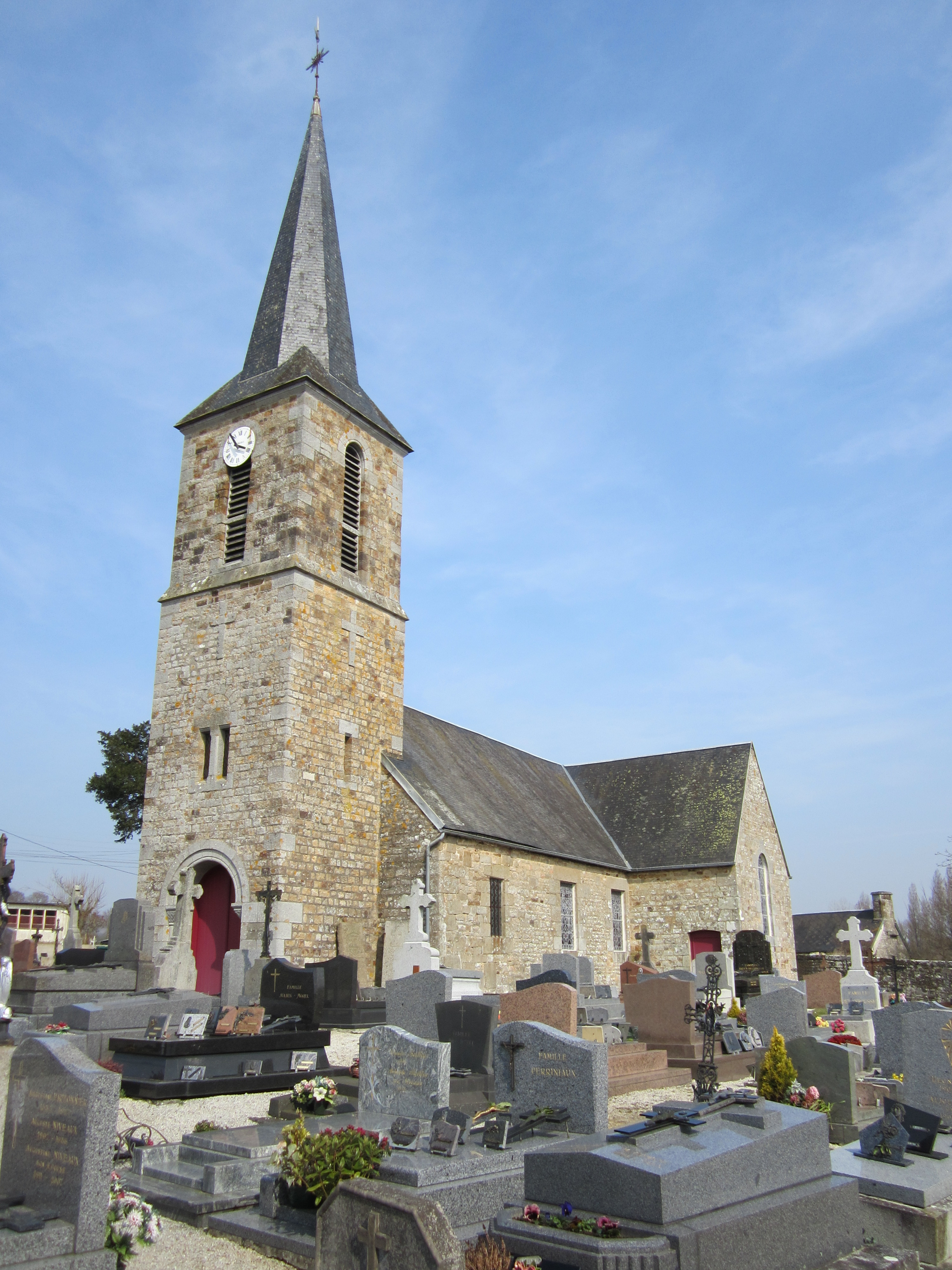
- The church of Notre-Dame-de-l'Assomption
- Location of Le Mesnil-Gilbert
- Location within France Location within Normandy
- Coordinates: 48°42′55″N 1°03′47″W
- Country: France
- Region: Normandy
- Department: Manche
- Arrondissement: Avranches
- Canton: Isigny-le-Buat
- Intercommunality: CA Mont-Saint-Michel-Normandie

Government
  - Mayor (2020–2026): Joël Lefras
- Area^{1}: 7.85 km^{2} (3.03 sq mi)
- Elevation: 60 m (200 ft)
- Highest elevation: 205 m (673 ft)
- Lowest elevation: 47 m (154 ft)
- Population (2023): 146
  - Density: 18.6/km^{2} (48.2/sq mi)
- Time zone: UTC+01:00 (CET)
  - Summer (DST): UTC+02:00 (CEST)
- INSEE/Postal code: 50312 /50670
- ^{1} French Land Register data, which excludes lakes, ponds, glaciers > 1 km^{2} (0.386 sq mi or 247 acres) and river estuaries.

Le Mesnil-Gilbert (French pronunciation: [lə mɛnil ʒilbɛʁ]) is a commune in the Manche department in Normandy in north-western France.

== See also ==
- Communes of the Manche department
