= Le Mesnil-Adelée =

- Commune
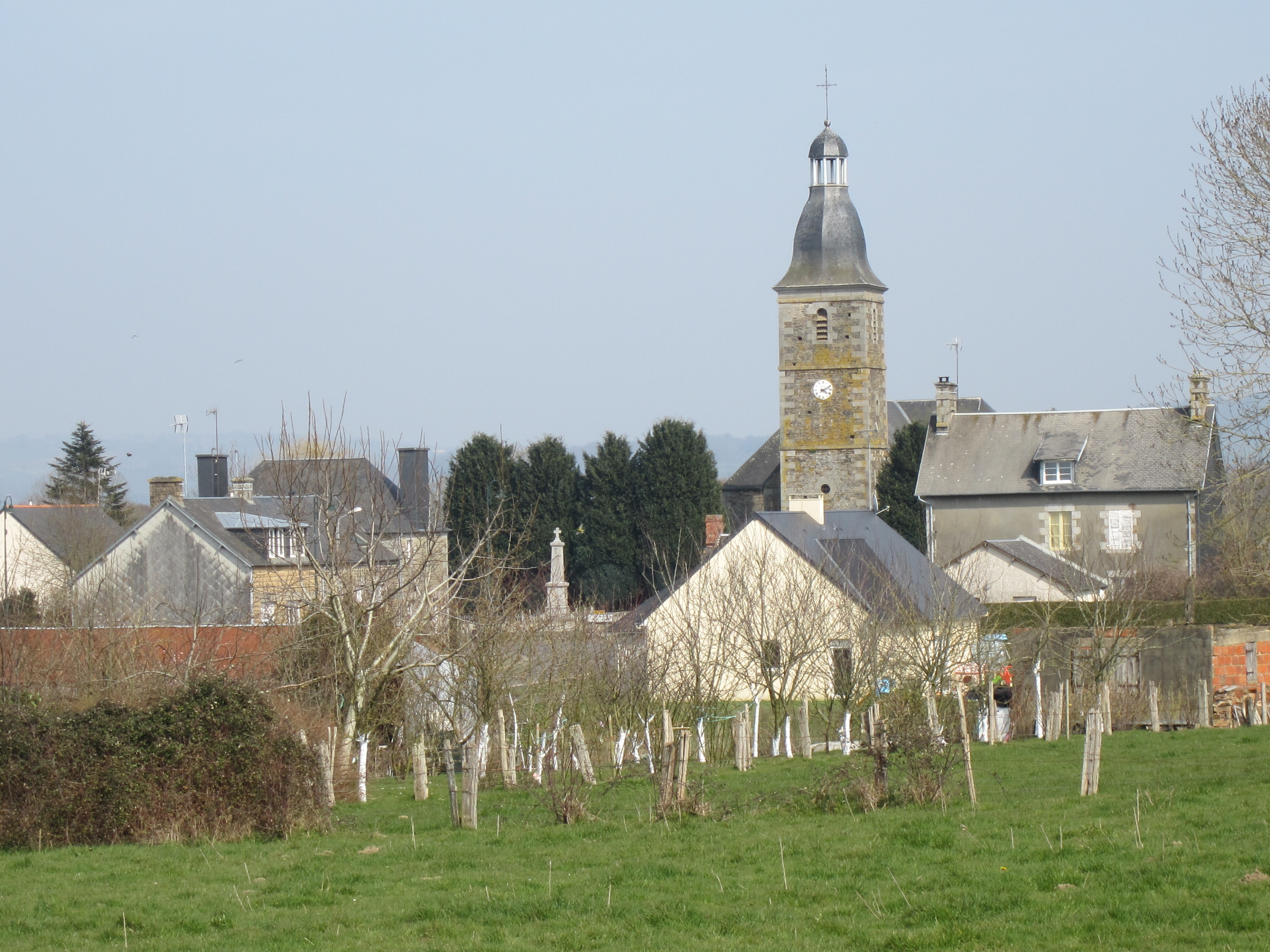
- The church and surroundings in Le Mesnil-Adelée
- Location of Le Mesnil-Adelée
- Location within France Location within Normandy
- Coordinates: 48°42′04″N 1°04′29″W
- Country: France
- Region: Normandy
- Department: Manche
- Arrondissement: Avranches
- Canton: Isigny-le-Buat
- Intercommunality: CA Mont-Saint-Michel-Normandie

Government
  - Mayor (2020–2026): Jean-Luc Rault
- Area^{1}: 6.82 km^{2} (2.63 sq mi)
- Elevation: 96 m (315 ft)
- Highest elevation: 231 m (758 ft)
- Lowest elevation: 47 m (154 ft)
- Population (2023): 157
  - Density: 23.0/km^{2} (59.6/sq mi)
- Time zone: UTC+01:00 (CET)
  - Summer (DST): UTC+02:00 (CEST)
- INSEE/Postal code: 50300 /50520
- ^{1} French Land Register data, which excludes lakes, ponds, glaciers > 1 km^{2} (0.386 sq mi or 247 acres) and river estuaries.

Le Mesnil-Adelée (French pronunciation: [lə mɛnil adle]) is a commune in the Manche department in Normandy in north-western France.

== See also ==
- Communes of the Manche department
