= Le Grand-Celland =

- Commune
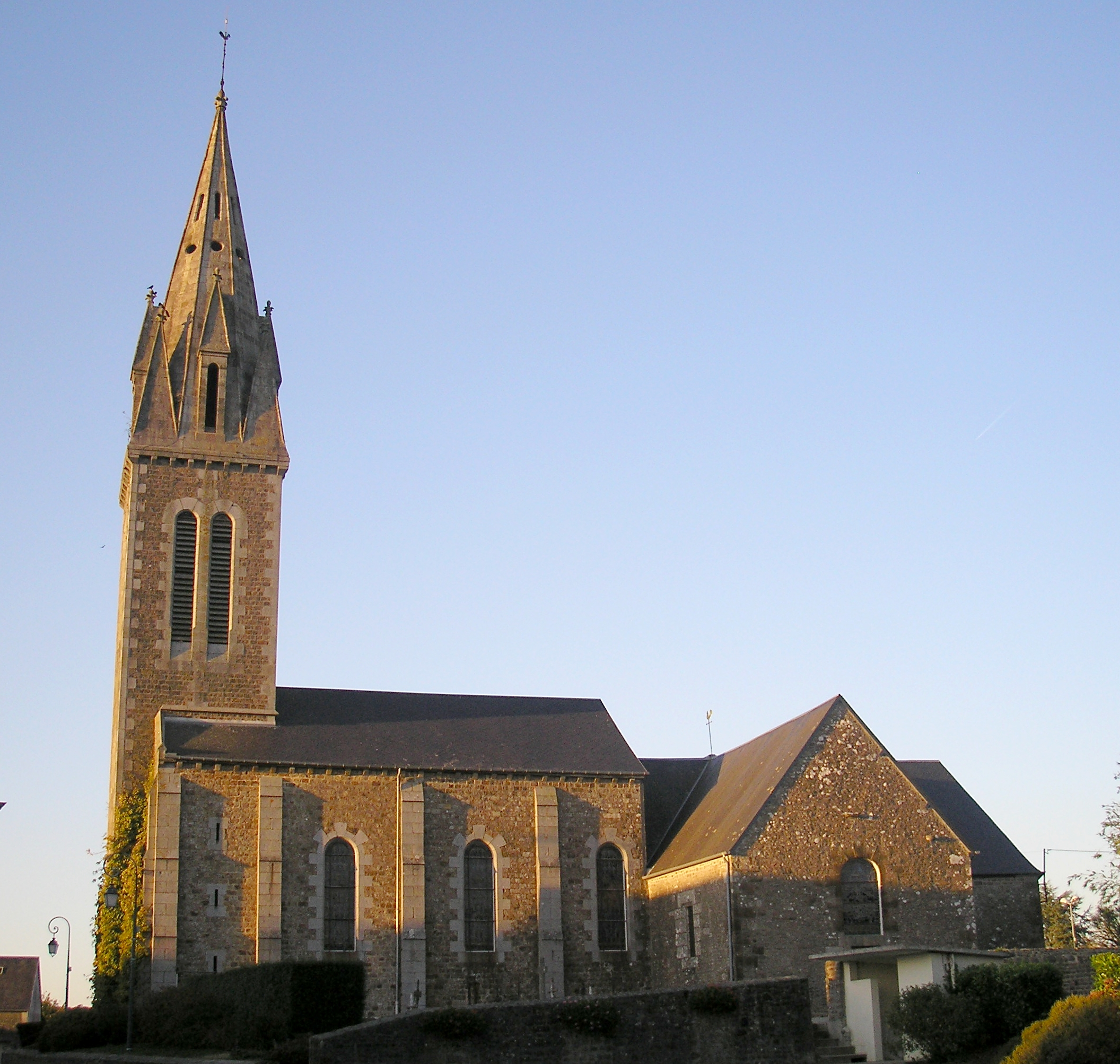
- The church of Saint-Médard
- Location of Le Grand-Celland
- Location within France Location within Normandy
- Coordinates: 48°40′54″N 1°11′05″W
- Country: France
- Region: Normandy
- Department: Manche
- Arrondissement: Avranches
- Canton: Isigny-le-Buat
- Intercommunality: CA Mont-Saint-Michel-Normandie

Government
  - Mayor (2020–2026): Richard Herpin
- Area^{1}: 12.45 km^{2} (4.81 sq mi)
- Elevation: 200 m (660 ft)
- Highest elevation: 225 m (738 ft)
- Lowest elevation: 50 m (160 ft)
- Population (2023): 592
  - Density: 47.6/km^{2} (123/sq mi)
- Time zone: UTC+01:00 (CET)
  - Summer (DST): UTC+02:00 (CEST)
- INSEE/Postal code: 50217 /50370
- ^{1} French Land Register data, which excludes lakes, ponds, glaciers > 1 km^{2} (0.386 sq mi or 247 acres) and river estuaries.

Le Grand-Celland (French pronunciation: [lə ɡʁɑ̃ sɛlɑ̃]) is a commune in the Manche department in north-western France.

== See also ==
- Communes of the Manche department
