= Aucey-la-Plaine =

- Commune
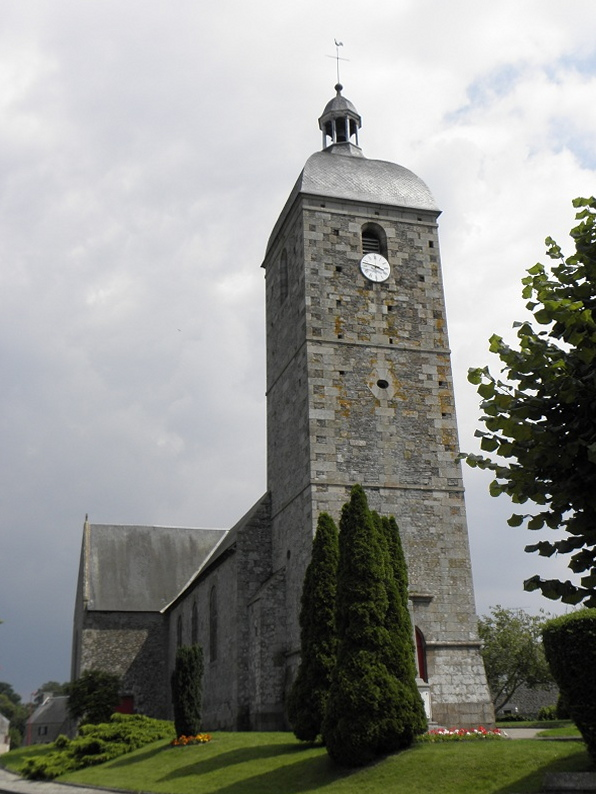
- Notre-Dame church
- Location of Aucey-la-Plaine
- Location within France Location within Normandy
- Coordinates: 48°31′41″N 1°28′37″W
- Country: France
- Region: Normandy
- Department: Manche
- Arrondissement: Avranches
- Canton: Pontorson
- Intercommunality: CA Mont-Saint-Michel-Normandie

Government
  - Mayor (2020–2026): Alain Bodin
- Area^{1}: 9.39 km^{2} (3.63 sq mi)
- Highest elevation: 61 m (200 ft)
- Lowest elevation: 5 m (16 ft)
- Population (2023): 412
  - Density: 43.9/km^{2} (114/sq mi)
- Time zone: UTC+01:00 (CET)
  - Summer (DST): UTC+02:00 (CEST)
- INSEE/Postal code: 50019 /50170
- ^{1} French Land Register data, which excludes lakes, ponds, glaciers > 1 km^{2} (0.386 sq mi or 247 acres) and river estuaries.

Aucey-la-Plaine (French pronunciation: [osɛ la plɛn]) is a commune in the Manche department in the Normandy region in northwestern France.

== Population ==
Historical population
Year	Pop.	±% p.a.
1968	444	—
1975	442	−0.06%
1982	419	−0.76%
1990	430	+0.32%
1999	362	−1.89%
2007	451	+2.79%
2012	444	−0.31%
2017	427	−0.78%
2023	412	−0.59%
Source: INSEE

== See also ==
- Communes of the Manche department
