= Les Cresnays =

- Commune
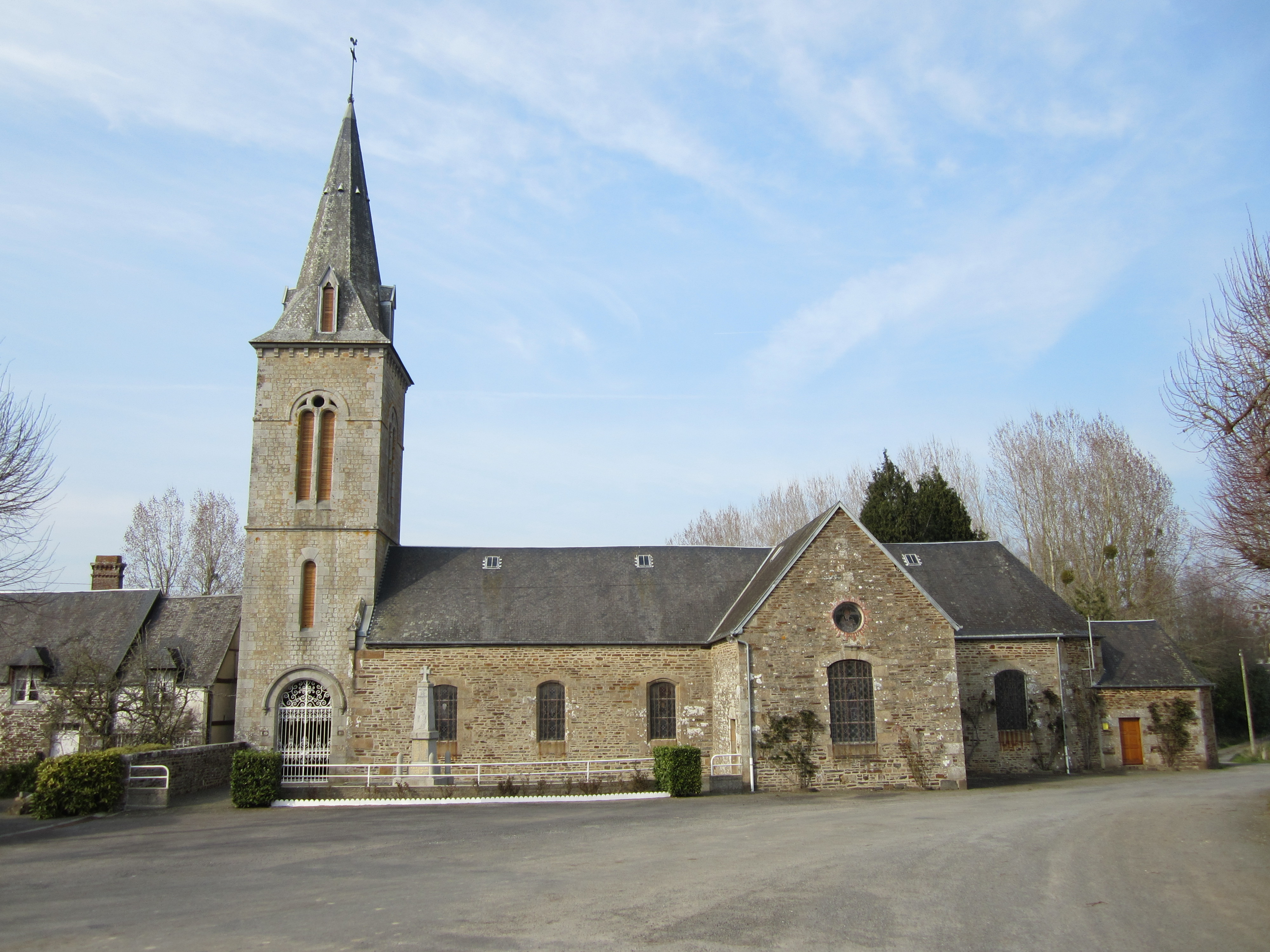
- The church of Saint-Pierre
- Location of Les Cresnays
- Location within France Location within Normandy
- Coordinates: 48°43′11″N 1°07′14″W
- Country: France
- Region: Normandy
- Department: Manche
- Arrondissement: Avranches
- Canton: Isigny-le-Buat
- Intercommunality: CA Mont-Saint-Michel-Normandie

Government
  - Mayor (2020–2026): Francis Leprieur
- Area^{1}: 9.78 km^{2} (3.78 sq mi)
- Elevation: 125 m (410 ft)
- Highest elevation: 131 m (430 ft)
- Lowest elevation: 32 m (105 ft)
- Population (2023): 227
  - Density: 23.2/km^{2} (60.1/sq mi)
- Time zone: UTC+01:00 (CET)
  - Summer (DST): UTC+02:00 (CEST)
- INSEE/Postal code: 50152 /50370
- ^{1} French Land Register data, which excludes lakes, ponds, glaciers > 1 km^{2} (0.386 sq mi or 247 acres) and river estuaries.

Les Cresnays (French pronunciation: [le kʁɛnɛ]) is a commune in the Manche department in Normandy in north-western France.

== See also ==
- Communes of the Manche department
