= Saint-Senier-sous-Avranches =

- Commune
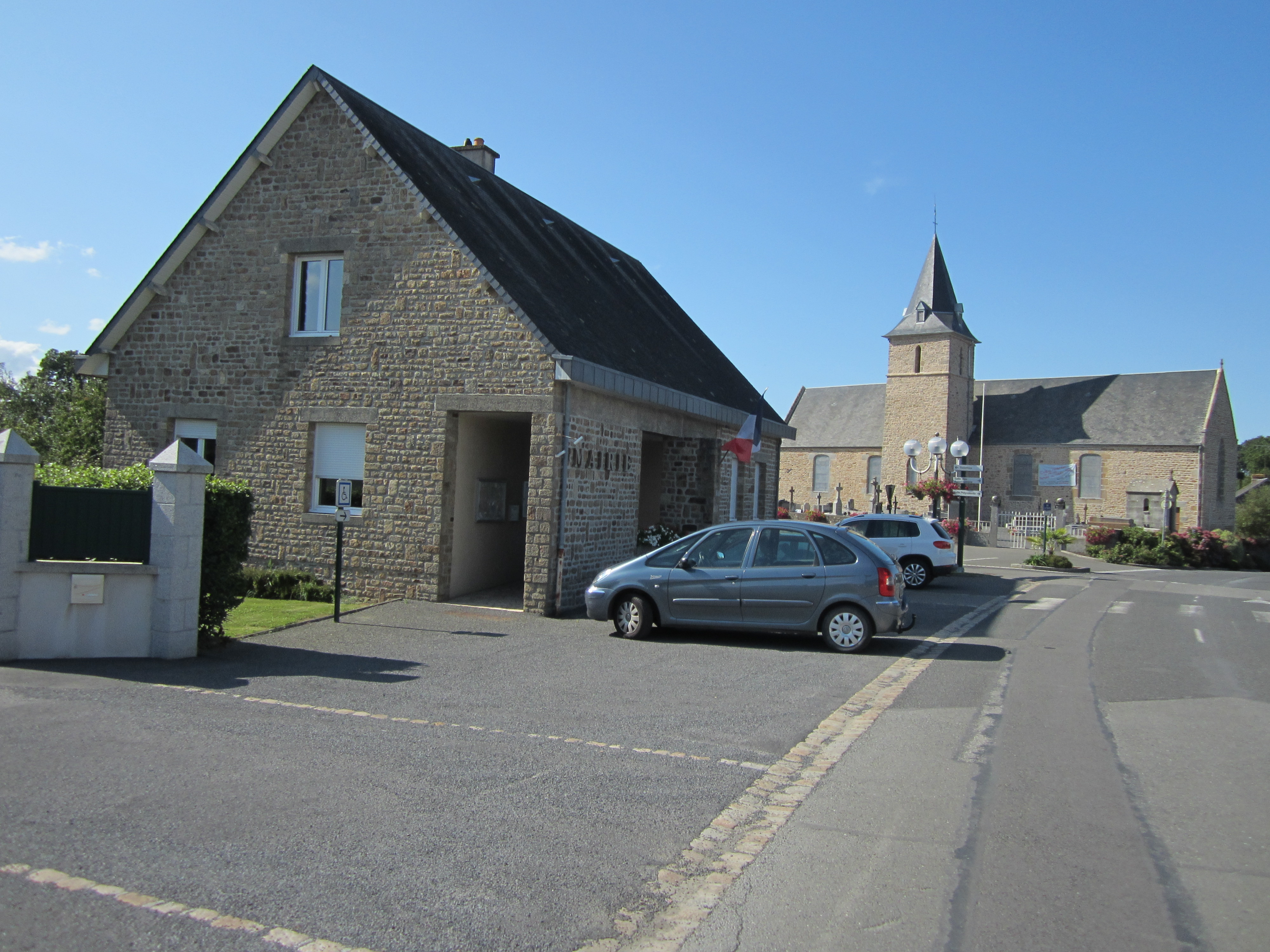
- View of the village
- Location of Saint-Senier-sous-Avranches
- Location within France Location within Normandy
- Coordinates: 48°41′07″N 1°20′24″W
- Country: France
- Region: Normandy
- Department: Manche
- Arrondissement: Avranches
- Canton: Isigny-le-Buat
- Intercommunality: CA Mont-Saint-Michel-Normandie

Government
  - Mayor (2022–2026): Lyne Delaunay
- Area^{1}: 8.62 km^{2} (3.33 sq mi)
- Elevation: 80 m (260 ft)
- Highest elevation: 126 m (413 ft)
- Lowest elevation: 7 m (23 ft)
- Population (2023): 1,451
  - Density: 168/km^{2} (436/sq mi)
- Time zone: UTC+01:00 (CET)
  - Summer (DST): UTC+02:00 (CEST)
- INSEE/Postal code: 50554 /50300
- ^{1} French Land Register data, which excludes lakes, ponds, glaciers > 1 km^{2} (0.386 sq mi or 247 acres) and river estuaries.

Saint-Senier-sous-Avranches (French pronunciation: [sɛ̃ sənje su.z‿avʁɑ̃ʃ], literally Saint Senier under Avranches) is a commune in the Manche department in Normandy in north-western France.

== Heraldry ==
Arms of Saint-Senier-sous-Avranches	The arms of Saint-Senier-sous-Avranches are blazoned : Per bend sinister 1: Gules, a hand appaumy argent 2: Azure, 2 fesses and 9 martlets countourny argent (dimidiated).

== See also ==
- Communes of the Manche department
