= Reffuveille =

- Commune
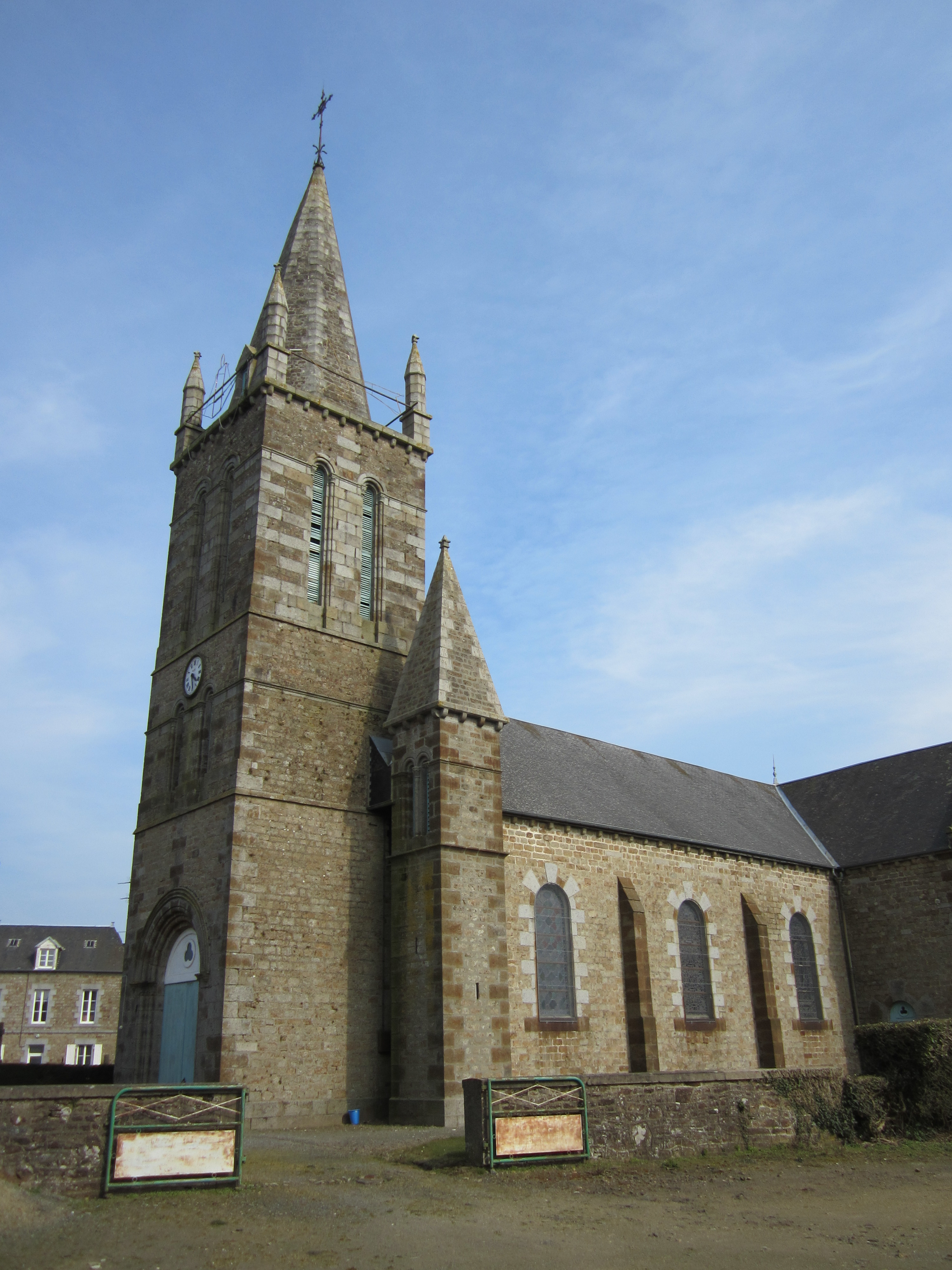
- The church of Saint-Léonard
- Location of Reffuveille
- Location within France Location within Normandy
- Coordinates: 48°40′09″N 1°06′51″W
- Country: France
- Region: Normandy
- Department: Manche
- Arrondissement: Avranches
- Canton: Isigny-le-Buat
- Intercommunality: CA Mont-Saint-Michel-Normandie

Government
  - Mayor (2020–2026): Jacques Vary
- Area^{1}: 23.34 km^{2} (9.01 sq mi)
- Elevation: 228 m (748 ft)
- Highest elevation: 244 m (801 ft)
- Lowest elevation: 69 m (226 ft)
- Population (2023): 550
  - Density: 24/km^{2} (61/sq mi)
- Demonym: Reffuveillais
- Time zone: UTC+01:00 (CET)
  - Summer (DST): UTC+02:00 (CEST)
- INSEE/Postal code: 50428 /50520
- ^{1} French Land Register data, which excludes lakes, ponds, glaciers > 1 km^{2} (0.386 sq mi or 247 acres) and river estuaries.

Reffuveille (French pronunciation: [ʁɛfyvɛj]) is a commune in the Manche department in north-western France.

== See also ==
- Communes of the Manche department
