= Vernix, Manche =

Vernix
- Commune
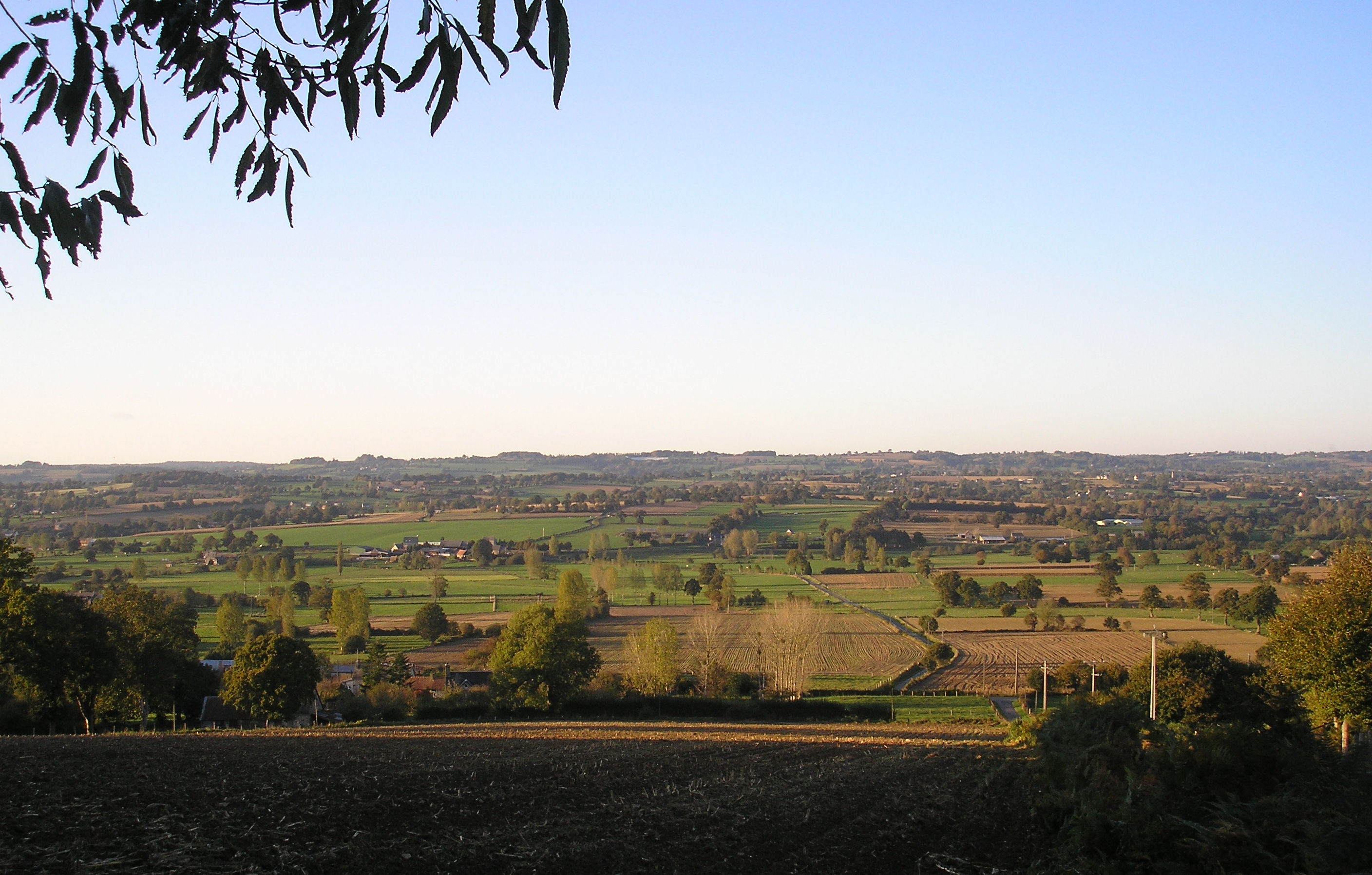
- A general view of Vernix
- Location of Vernix
- Location within France Location within Normandy
- Coordinates: 48°42′59″N 1°13′25″W
- Country: France
- Region: Normandy
- Department: Manche
- Arrondissement: Avranches
- Canton: Isigny-le-Buat
- Intercommunality: CA Mont-Saint-Michel-Normandie

Government
  - Mayor (2020–2026): Gilles Chevaillier
- Area^{1}: 5.84 km^{2} (2.25 sq mi)
- Elevation: 20 m (66 ft)
- Highest elevation: 83 m (272 ft)
- Lowest elevation: 17 m (56 ft)
- Population (2023): 154
  - Density: 26.4/km^{2} (68.3/sq mi)
- Time zone: UTC+01:00 (CET)
  - Summer (DST): UTC+02:00 (CEST)
- INSEE/Postal code: 50628 /50370
- ^{1} French Land Register data, which excludes lakes, ponds, glaciers > 1 km^{2} (0.386 sq mi or 247 acres) and river estuaries.

Vernix (French pronunciation: [vɛʁni]) is a commune in the Manche department in Normandy in north-western France. Vernix is the home of 155 people (2018). Vernix is part of the arrondissement of Avranches and the canton of Isigny-le-Buat.

== See also ==
- Communes of the Manche department
