= Saint-Loup, Manche =

Saint-Loup
- Commune
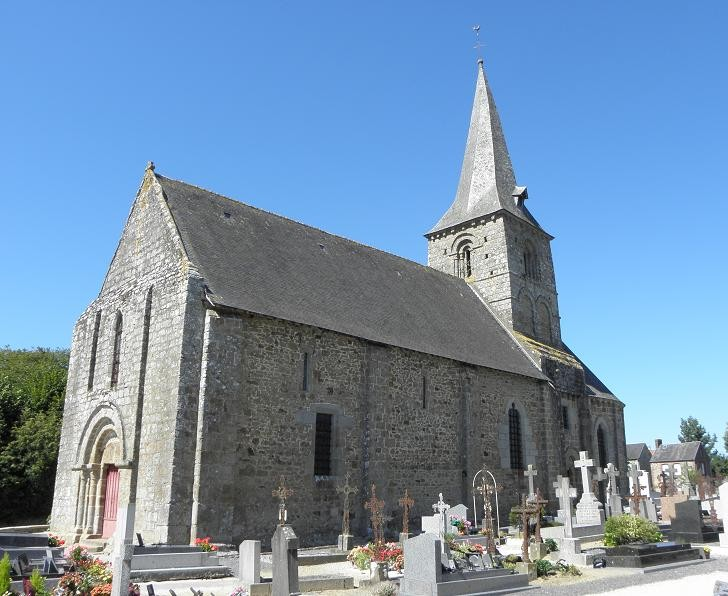
- The parish church of Saint-Loup
- Location of Saint-Loup
- Location within France Location within Normandy
- Coordinates: 48°40′07″N 1°17′38″W
- Country: France
- Region: Normandy
- Department: Manche
- Arrondissement: Avranches
- Canton: Isigny-le-Buat
- Intercommunality: CA Mont-Saint-Michel-Normandie

Government
  - Mayor (2020–2026): Gérard Daligault
- Area^{1}: 6.45 km^{2} (2.49 sq mi)
- Elevation: 77 m (253 ft)
- Highest elevation: 124 m (407 ft)
- Lowest elevation: 16 m (52 ft)
- Population (2023): 686
  - Density: 106/km^{2} (275/sq mi)
- Time zone: UTC+01:00 (CET)
  - Summer (DST): UTC+02:00 (CEST)
- INSEE/Postal code: 50505 /50300
- ^{1} French Land Register data, which excludes lakes, ponds, glaciers > 1 km^{2} (0.386 sq mi or 247 acres) and river estuaries.

Saint-Loup (French pronunciation: [sɛ̃ lu]) is a commune in the Manche department in Normandy in north-western France.

== See also ==
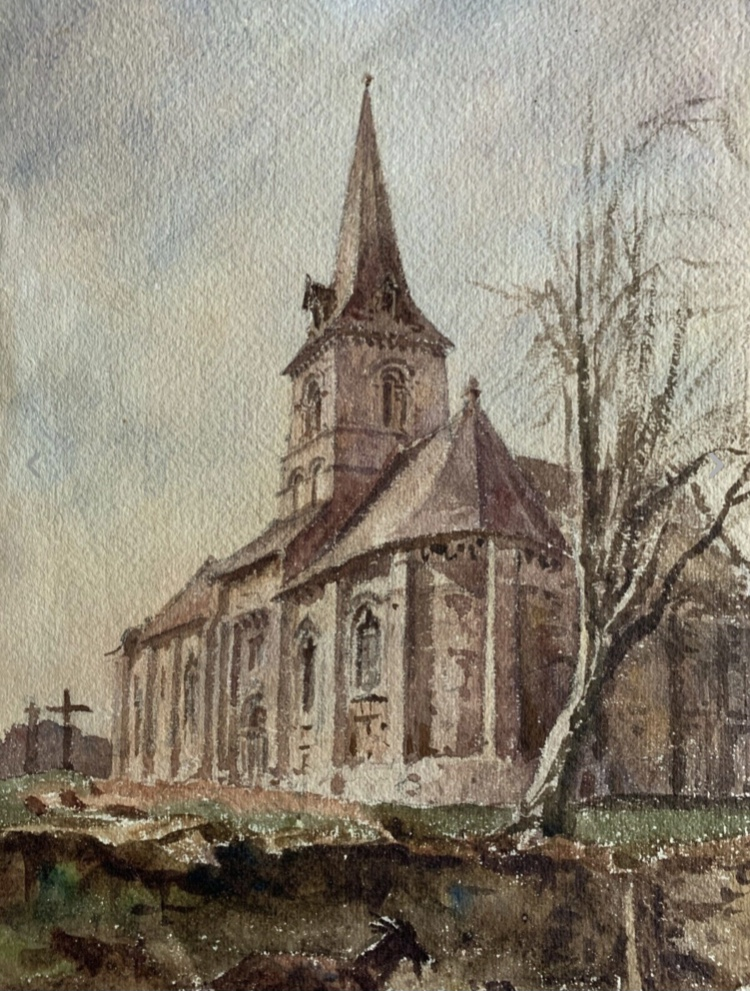
Church of Saint-Loup by John Louis Petit, 1854

- Communes of the Manche department
