= La Chaise-Baudouin =

- Commune
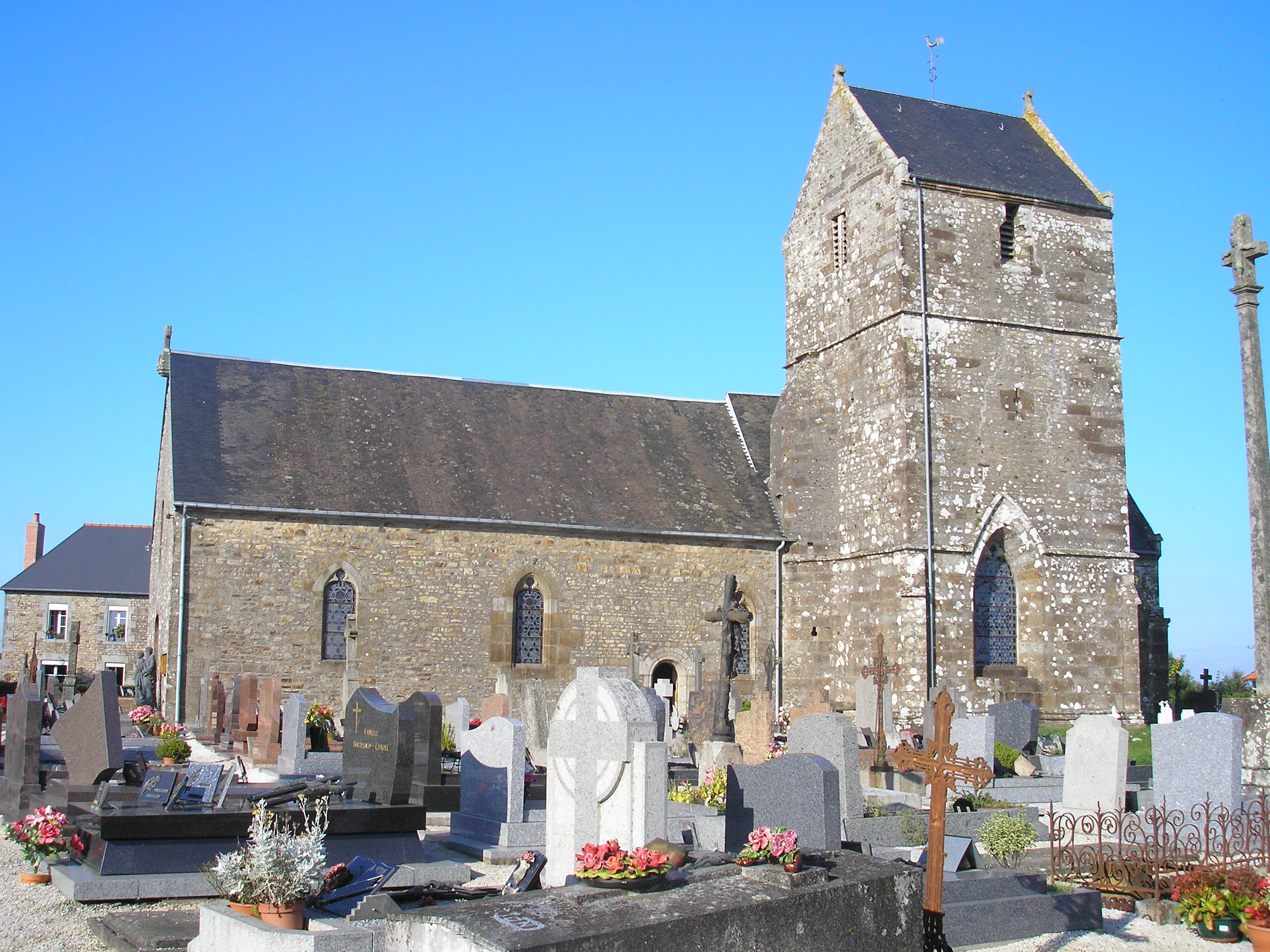
- The church of Saint-Ouen
- Location of La Chaise-Baudouin
- Location within France Location within Normandy
- Coordinates: 48°45′52″N 1°14′09″W
- Country: France
- Region: Normandy
- Department: Manche
- Arrondissement: Avranches
- Canton: Isigny-le-Buat
- Intercommunality: CA Mont-Saint-Michel-Normandie

Government
  - Mayor (2020–2026): Thierry Sadiman
- Area^{1}: 12.06 km^{2} (4.66 sq mi)
- Elevation: 187 m (614 ft)
- Highest elevation: 205 m (673 ft)
- Lowest elevation: 55 m (180 ft)
- Population (2023): 435
  - Density: 36.1/km^{2} (93.4/sq mi)
- Time zone: UTC+01:00 (CET)
  - Summer (DST): UTC+02:00 (CEST)
- INSEE/Postal code: 50112 /50370
- ^{1} French Land Register data, which excludes lakes, ponds, glaciers > 1 km^{2} (0.386 sq mi or 247 acres) and river estuaries.

La Chaise-Baudouin (French pronunciation: [la ʃɛz bodwɛ̃]) is a commune in the Manche department in Normandy in north-western France.

== See also ==
- Communes of the Manche department
