= Lingeard =

- Commune
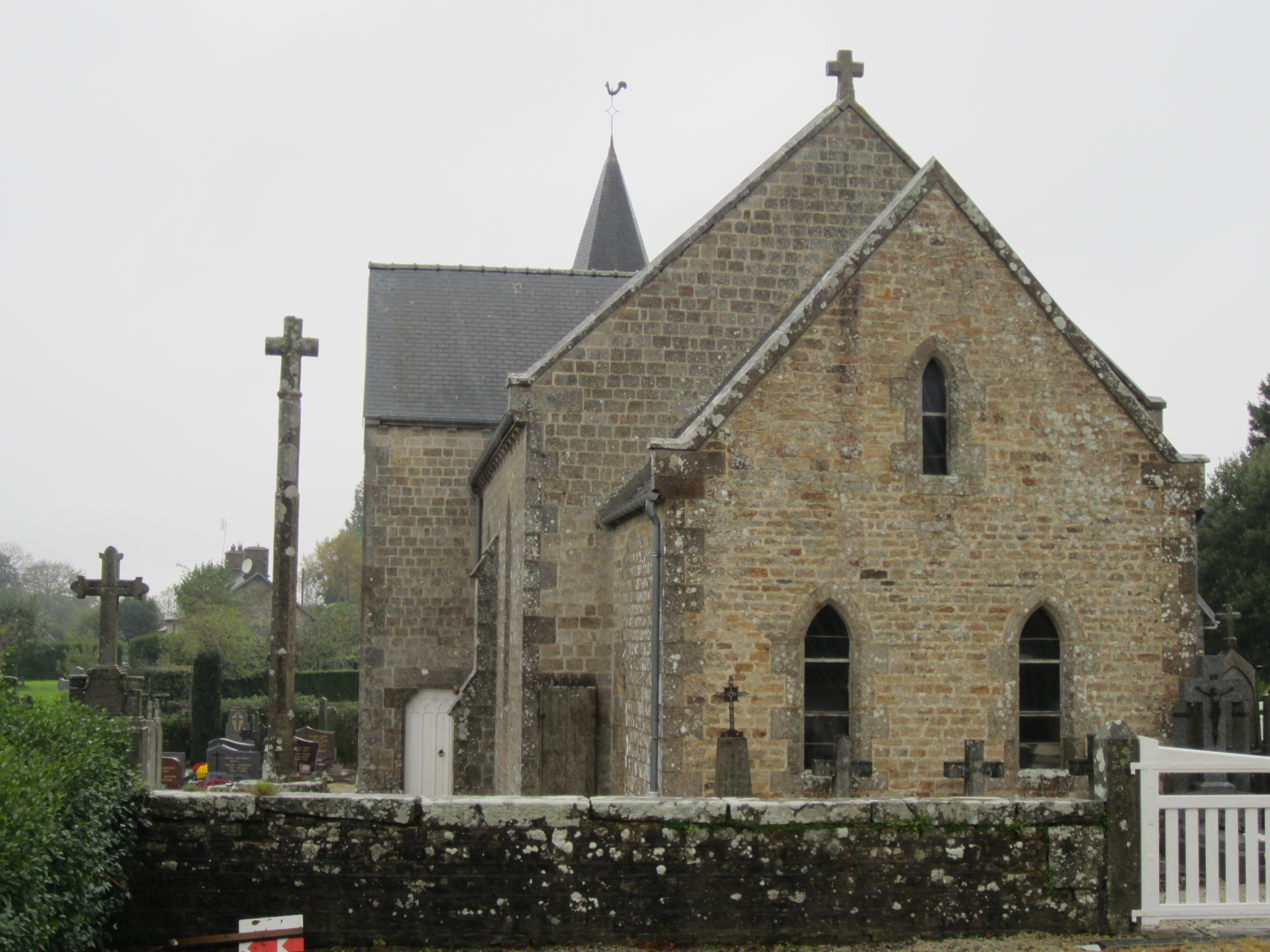
- The church of Saint-Sauveur
- Location of Lingeard
- Location within France Location within Normandy
- Coordinates: 48°44′23″N 1°01′29″W
- Country: France
- Region: Normandy
- Department: Manche
- Arrondissement: Avranches
- Canton: Isigny-le-Buat
- Intercommunality: CA Mont-Saint-Michel-Normandie

Government
  - Mayor (2020–2026): Michel Mary
- Area^{1}: 3.65 km^{2} (1.41 sq mi)
- Elevation: 283 m (928 ft)
- Highest elevation: 287 m (942 ft)
- Lowest elevation: 110 m (360 ft)
- Population (2023): 80
  - Density: 22/km^{2} (57/sq mi)
- Time zone: UTC+01:00 (CET)
  - Summer (DST): UTC+02:00 (CEST)
- INSEE/Postal code: 50271 /50670
- ^{1} French Land Register data, which excludes lakes, ponds, glaciers > 1 km^{2} (0.386 sq mi or 247 acres) and river estuaries.

Lingeard (French pronunciation: [lɛ̃ʒaʁ]) is a commune in the Manche department in Normandy in north-western France.

== See also ==
- Communes of the Manche department
