= Précey =

- Commune
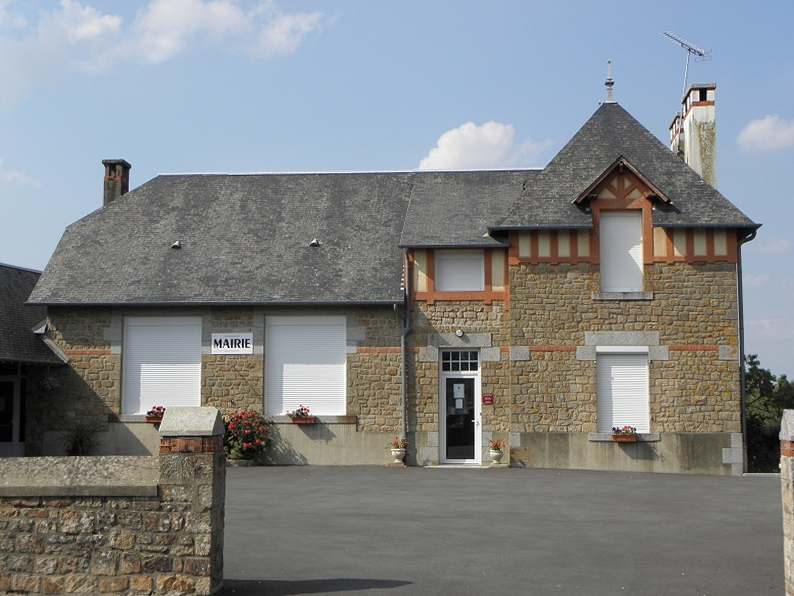
- Town hall
- Location of Précey
- Location within France Location within Normandy
- Coordinates: 48°36′30″N 1°22′34″W
- Country: France
- Region: Normandy
- Department: Manche
- Arrondissement: Avranches
- Canton: Pontorson
- Intercommunality: CA Mont-Saint-Michel-Normandie

Government
  - Mayor (2021–2026): Corinne Lebrun
- Area^{1}: 7.73 km^{2} (2.98 sq mi)
- Elevation: 48 m (157 ft)
- Highest elevation: 73 m (240 ft)
- Lowest elevation: 13 m (43 ft)
- Population (2023): 559
  - Density: 72.3/km^{2} (187/sq mi)
- Time zone: UTC+01:00 (CET)
  - Summer (DST): UTC+02:00 (CEST)
- INSEE/Postal code: 50413 /50220
- ^{1} French Land Register data, which excludes lakes, ponds, glaciers > 1 km^{2} (0.386 sq mi or 247 acres) and river estuaries.

Précey (French pronunciation: [pʁesɛ]) is a commune in the Manche department in Normandy in north-western France.

== See also ==
- Communes of the Manche department
