= Sée =

River in France

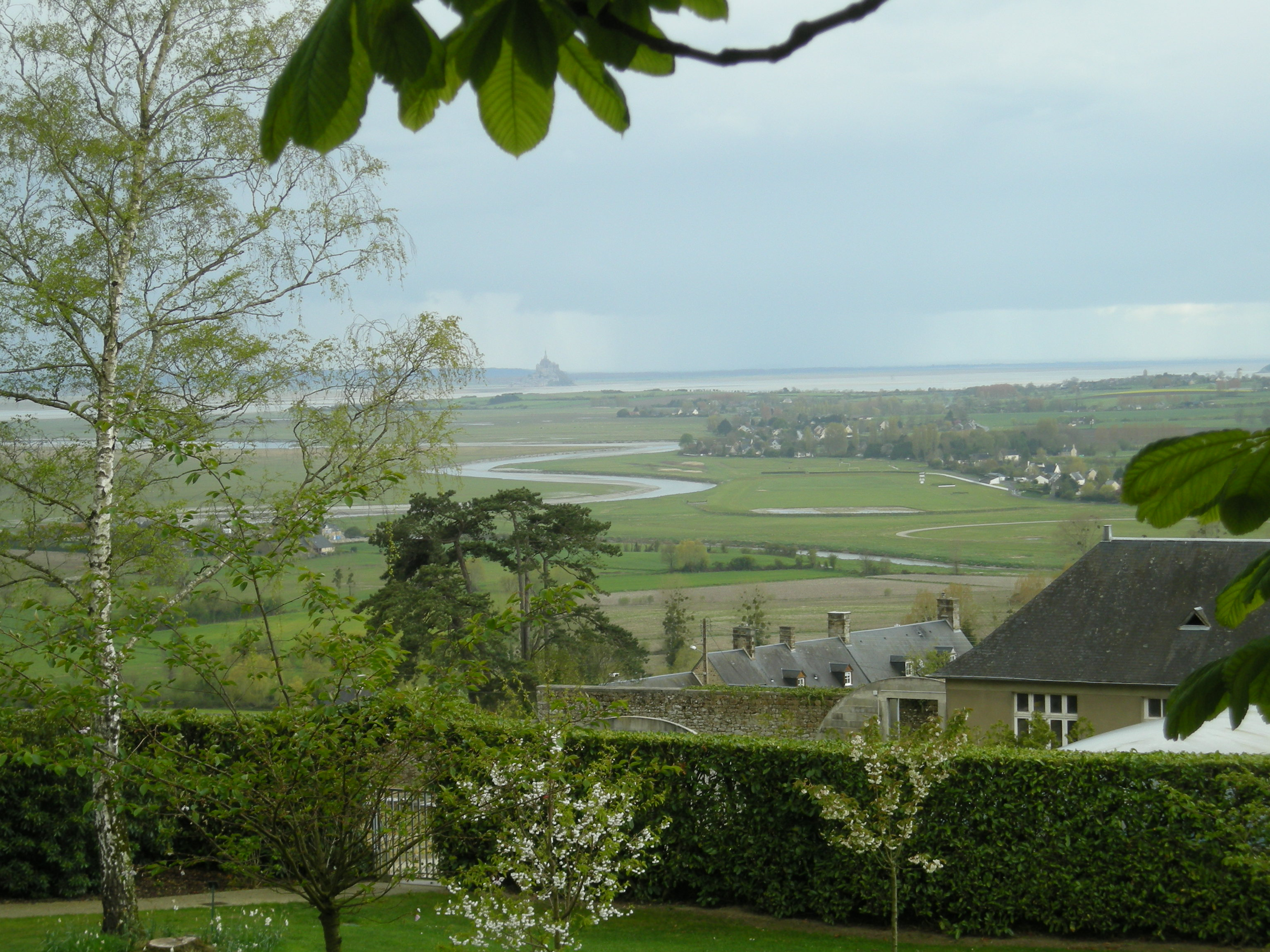

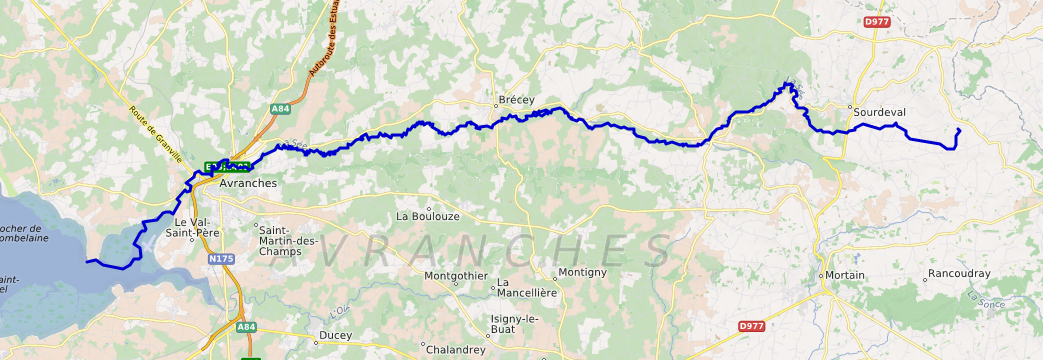

Location
- Country: France

Physical characteristics
- Source
  - location: Normandy
- Mouth
  - location: English Channel
  - coordinates: 48°40′0″N 1°24′31″W
- Length: 79 km (49 mi)

The Sée is a 79 km long river in the Manche department, Normandy, France, beginning near Sourdeval. It empties into the bay of Mont Saint-Michel (part of the English Channel) in Avranches, close to the mouth of the Sélune river. Another town along the Sée is Brécey.
