= La Godefroy =

- Commune
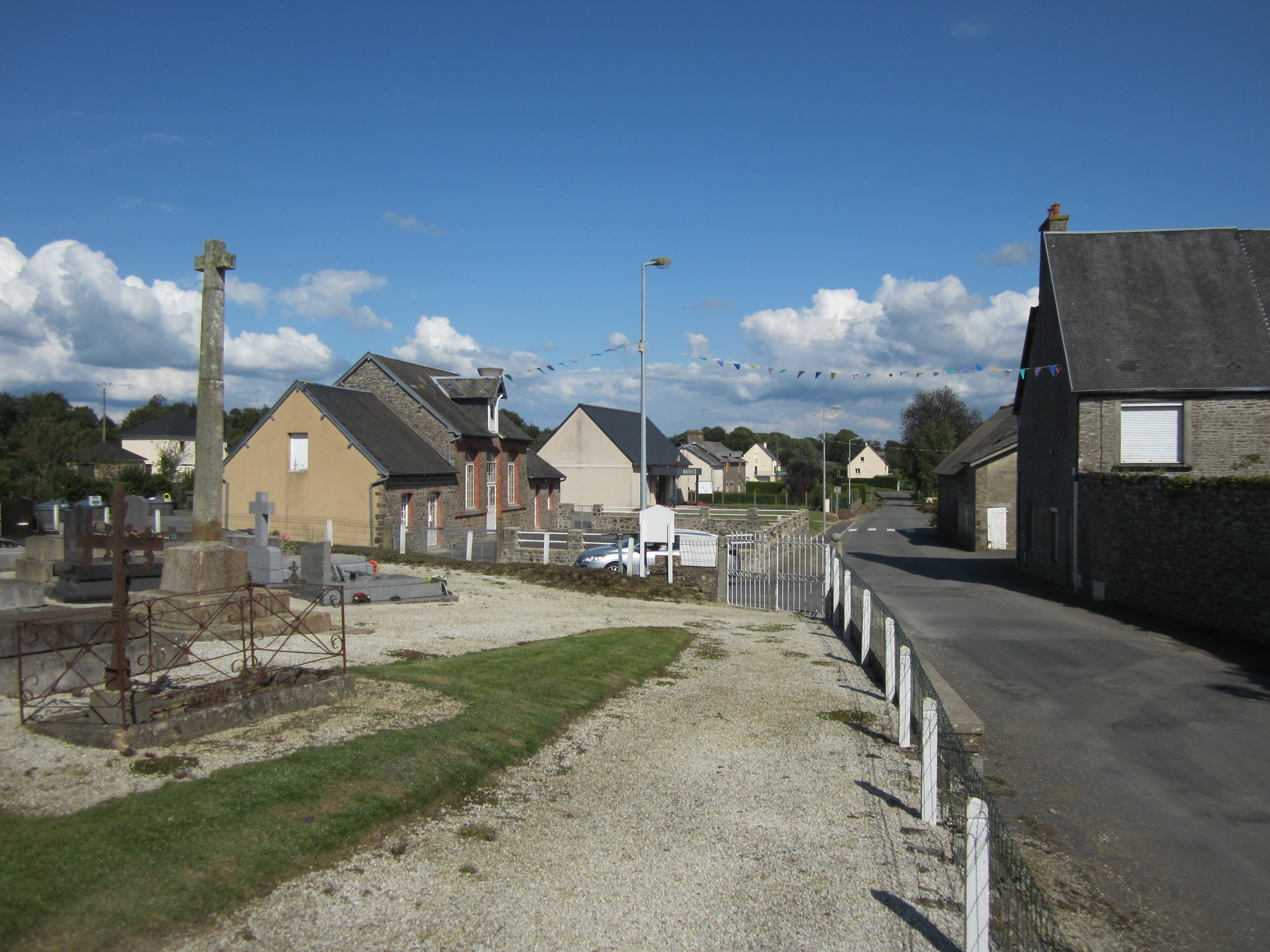
- Village view
- Location of La Godefroy
- Location within France Location within Normandy
- Coordinates: 48°41′26″N 1°17′17″W
- Country: France
- Region: Normandy
- Department: Manche
- Arrondissement: Avranches
- Canton: Isigny-le-Buat
- Intercommunality: CA Mont-Saint-Michel-Normandie

Government
  - Mayor (2020–2026): Brigitte Petitcolin
- Area^{1}: 3.65 km^{2} (1.41 sq mi)
- Elevation: 109 m (358 ft)
- Highest elevation: 137 m (449 ft)
- Lowest elevation: 40 m (130 ft)
- Population (2023): 301
  - Density: 82.5/km^{2} (214/sq mi)
- Time zone: UTC+01:00 (CET)
  - Summer (DST): UTC+02:00 (CEST)
- INSEE/Postal code: 50205 /50300
- ^{1} French Land Register data, which excludes lakes, ponds, glaciers > 1 km^{2} (0.386 sq mi or 247 acres) and river estuaries.

La Godefroy (French pronunciation: [la ɡɔdəfʁwa]) is a commune in the Manche department in north-western France.

== See also ==
- Communes of the Manche department
