= Communauté d'agglomération Mont-Saint-Michel-Normandie =

Mont-Saint-Michel-Normandie
- Communauté d'agglomération
- Interactive map of Mont-Saint-Michel-Normandie
- Coordinates: 48°38′N 01°10′W
- Country: France
- Region: Normandy
- Department: Manche
- No. of communes: {{{nbcomm}}}
- Established: 2017
- Area: 1,543.9 km^{2} (596.1 sq mi)
- Population (2019): 87,613
  - Density: 56.748/km^{2} (146.98/sq mi)
- Website: www.msm-normandie.fr

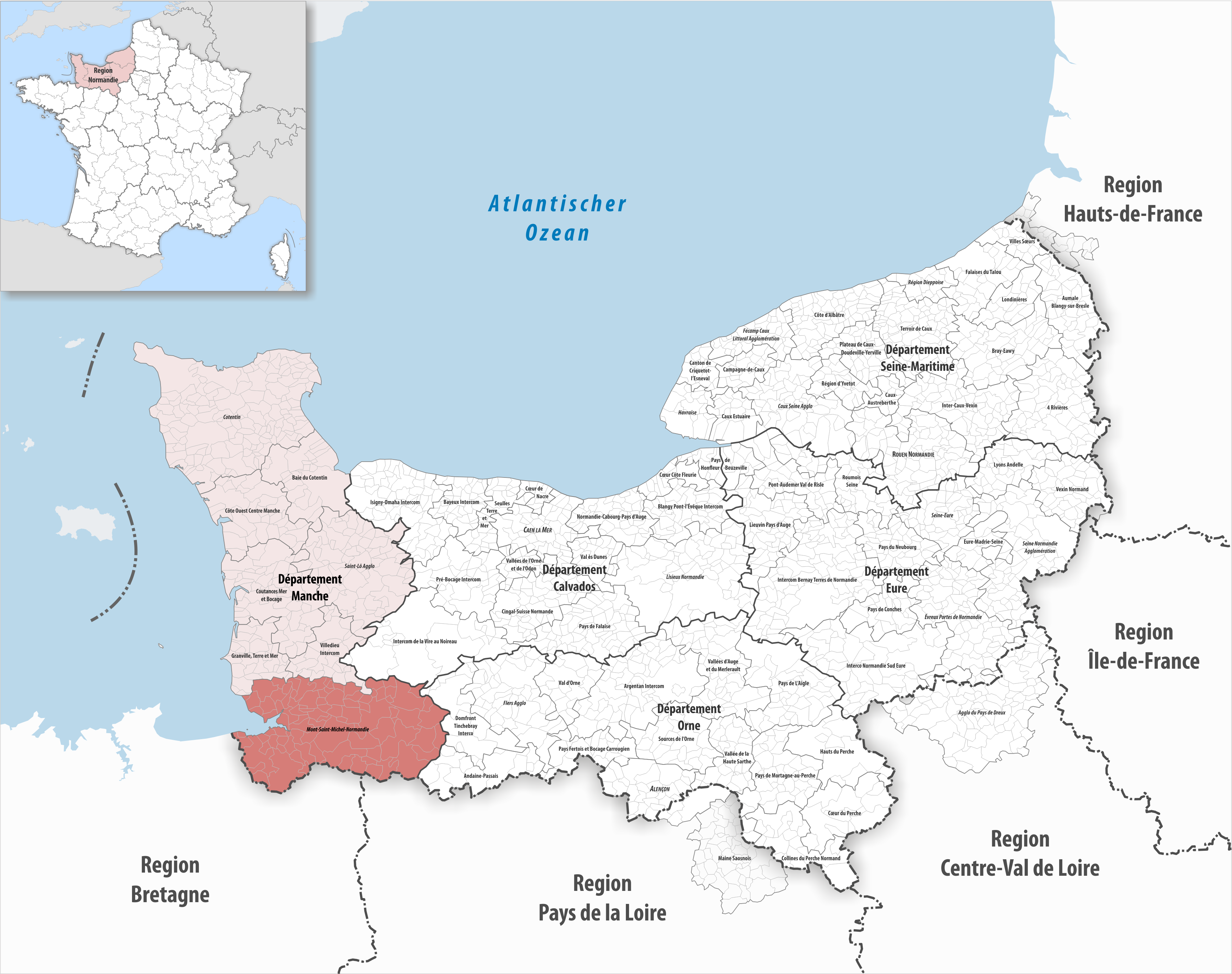
Location of the communauté (dark red) in Normandy

Communauté d'agglomération Mont-Saint-Michel-Normandie is a communauté d'agglomération, an intercommunal structure. It covers the southern part of the Manche department, in the Normandy region, northwestern France. Created in 2017, its seat is in Avranches. Its area is 1,543.9 km^{2}. Its population was 87,613 in 2019.

== Composition ==
The communauté d'agglomération consists of the following 95 communes:

1. Aucey-la-Plaine
2. Avranches
3. Bacilly
4. Barenton
5. Beauficel
6. Beauvoir
7. Brécey
8. Brouains
9. Buais-les-Monts
10. Céaux
11. La Chaise-Baudouin
12. La Chapelle-Urée
13. Chaulieu
14. Chavoy
15. Courtils
16. Les Cresnays
17. Crollon
18. Cuves
19. Dragey-Ronthon
20. Ducey-Les Chéris
21. Le Fresne-Poret
22. Gathemo
23. Genêts
24. Ger
25. La Godefroy
26. Le Grand-Celland
27. Grandparigny
28. Le Grippon
29. Hamelin
30. Huisnes-sur-Mer
31. Isigny-le-Buat
32. Juilley
33. Juvigny les Vallées
34. Lapenty
35. Lingeard
36. Les Loges-Marchis
37. Les Loges-sur-Brécey
38. Lolif
39. Le Luot
40. Marcey-les-Grèves
41. Marcilly
42. Le Mesnil-Adelée
43. Le Mesnil-Gilbert
44. Le Mesnillard
45. Le Mesnil-Ozenne
46. Montjoie-Saint-Martin
47. Le Mont-Saint-Michel
48. Mortain-Bocage
49. Moulines
50. Le Neufbourg
51. Notre-Dame-de-Livoye
52. Le Parc
53. Perriers-en-Beauficel
54. Le Petit-Celland
55. Poilley
56. Pontaubault
57. Pontorson
58. Ponts
59. Précey
60. Reffuveille
61. Romagny-Fontenay
62. Sacey
63. Saint-Aubin-de-Terregatte
64. Saint-Barthélemy
65. Saint-Brice
66. Saint-Brice-de-Landelles
67. Saint-Clément-Rancoudray
68. Saint-Cyr-du-Bailleul
69. Saint-Georges-de-Livoye
70. Saint-Georges-de-Rouelley
71. Saint-Hilaire-du-Harcouët
72. Saint-James
73. Saint-Jean-de-la-Haize
74. Saint-Jean-du-Corail-des-Bois
75. Saint-Jean-le-Thomas
76. Saint-Laurent-de-Cuves
77. Saint-Laurent-de-Terregatte
78. Saint-Loup
79. Saint-Michel-de-Montjoie
80. Saint-Nicolas-des-Bois
81. Saint-Ovin
82. Saint-Quentin-sur-le-Homme
83. Saint-Senier-de-Beuvron
84. Saint-Senier-sous-Avranches
85. Sartilly-Baie-Bocage
86. Savigny-le-Vieux
87. Servon
88. Sourdeval
89. Subligny
90. Tanis
91. Le Teilleul
92. Tirepied-sur-Sée
93. Vains
94. Le Val-Saint-Père
95. Vernix
