= Le Petit-Celland =

- Commune
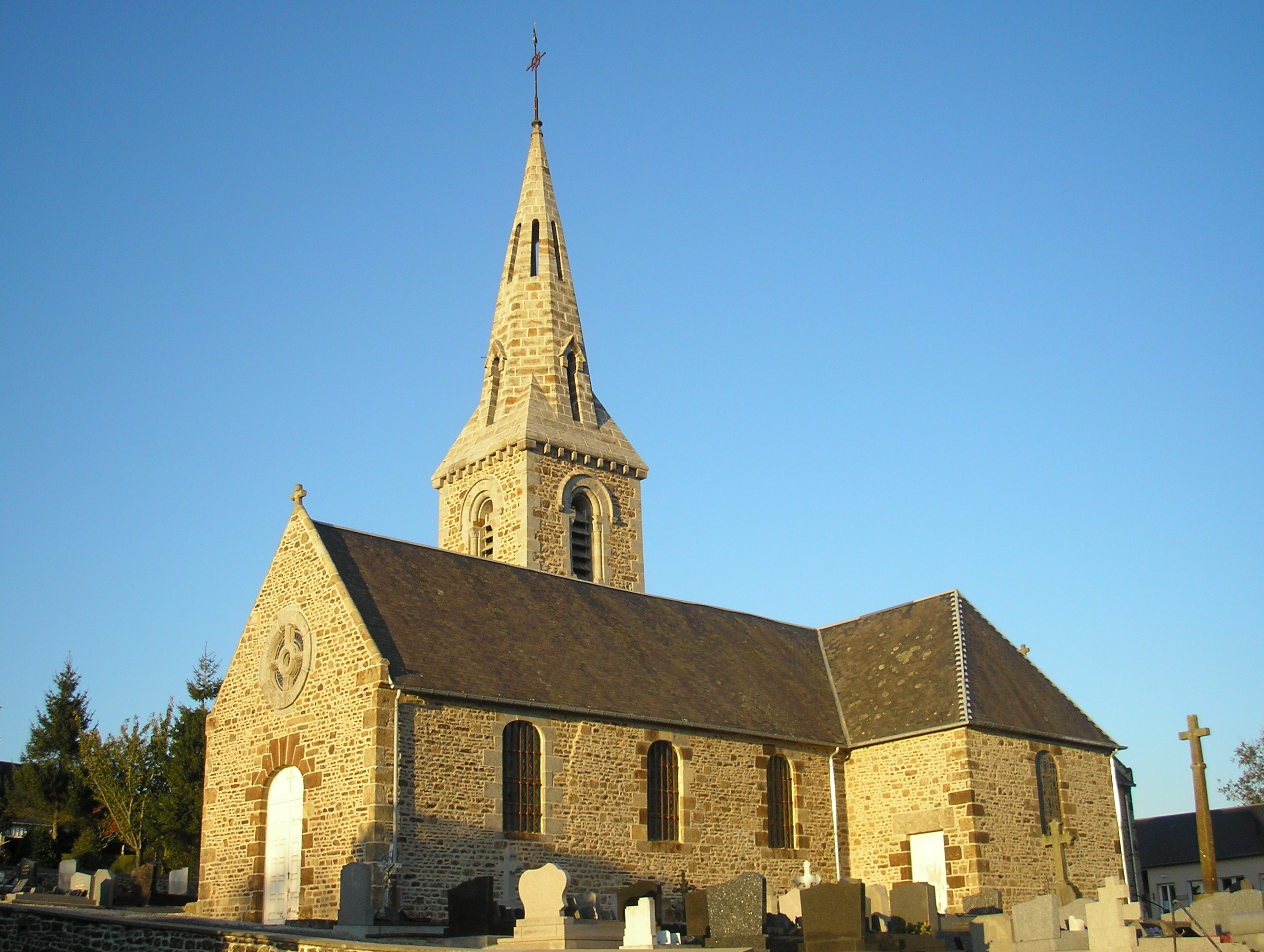
- The church of Saint-Ouen
- Location of Le Petit-Celland
- Location within France Location within Normandy
- Coordinates: 48°41′48″N 1°12′32″W
- Country: France
- Region: Normandy
- Department: Manche
- Arrondissement: Avranches
- Canton: Isigny-le-Buat
- Intercommunality: CA Mont-Saint-Michel-Normandie

Government
  - Mayor (2020–2026): Jérome Benoit
- Area^{1}: 6.57 km^{2} (2.54 sq mi)
- Elevation: 106 m (348 ft)
- Highest elevation: 193 m (633 ft)
- Lowest elevation: 22 m (72 ft)
- Population (2023): 176
  - Density: 26.8/km^{2} (69.4/sq mi)
- Time zone: UTC+01:00 (CET)
  - Summer (DST): UTC+02:00 (CEST)
- INSEE/Postal code: 50399 /50370
- Website: www.lepetitcelland.fr
- ^{1} French Land Register data, which excludes lakes, ponds, glaciers > 1 km^{2} (0.386 sq mi or 247 acres) and river estuaries.

Le Petit-Celland (French pronunciation: [lə pəti sɛlɑ̃]) is a commune in the Manche department in Normandy in north-western France.

== See also ==
- Communes of the Manche department
