= Saint-Brice, Manche =

Saint-Brice
- Commune
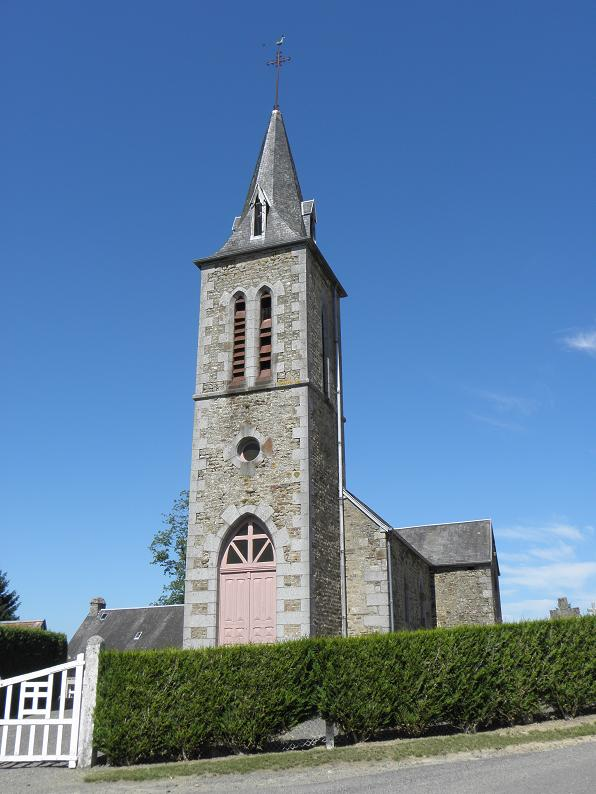
- The church of Saint-Brice
- Location of Saint-Brice
- Location within France Location within Normandy
- Coordinates: 48°41′57″N 1°18′23″W
- Country: France
- Region: Normandy
- Department: Manche
- Arrondissement: Avranches
- Canton: Isigny-le-Buat
- Intercommunality: CA Mont-Saint-Michel-Normandie

Government
  - Mayor (2020–2026): Gilbert Poidevin
- Area^{1}: 2.55 km^{2} (0.98 sq mi)
- Elevation: 80 m (260 ft)
- Highest elevation: 115 m (377 ft)
- Lowest elevation: 9 m (30 ft)
- Population (2023): 140
  - Density: 55/km^{2} (140/sq mi)
- Time zone: UTC+01:00 (CET)
  - Summer (DST): UTC+02:00 (CEST)
- INSEE/Postal code: 50451 /50300
- ^{1} French Land Register data, which excludes lakes, ponds, glaciers > 1 km^{2} (0.386 sq mi or 247 acres) and river estuaries.

Saint-Brice (French pronunciation: [sɛ̃ bʁis]) is a commune in the Manche department in Normandy in north-western France.

== See also ==
- Communes of the Manche department
