= La Chapelle-Urée =

- Commune
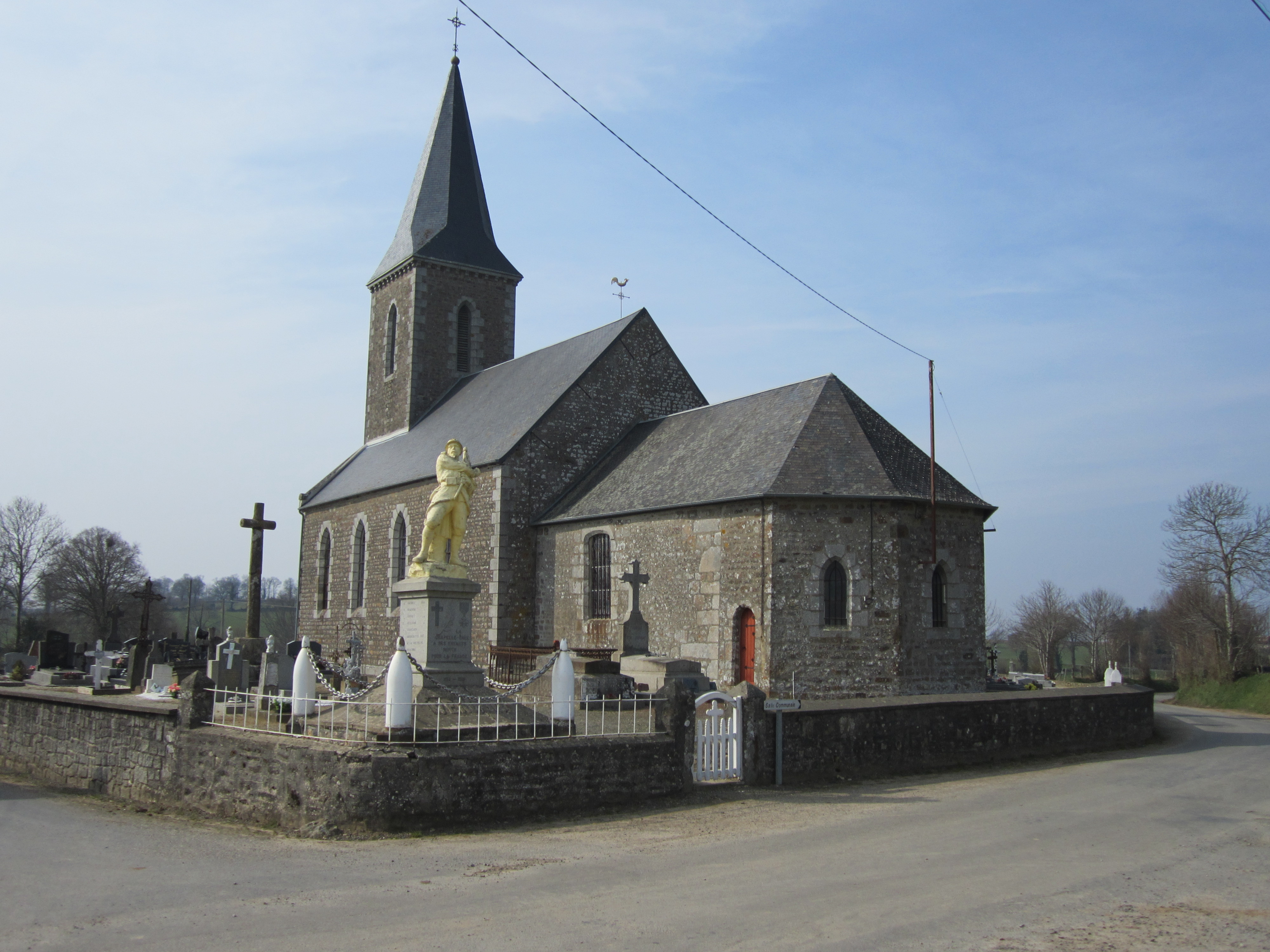
- The church of Notre-Dame
- Location of La Chapelle-Urée
- Location within France Location within Normandy
- Coordinates: 48°40′18″N 1°09′00″W
- Country: France
- Region: Normandy
- Department: Manche
- Arrondissement: Avranches
- Canton: Isigny-le-Buat
- Intercommunality: CA Mont-Saint-Michel-Normandie

Government
  - Mayor (2020–2026): Jocelyne Leprieur
- Area^{1}: 4.60 km^{2} (1.78 sq mi)
- Elevation: 212 m (696 ft)
- Highest elevation: 237 m (778 ft)
- Lowest elevation: 140 m (460 ft)
- Population (2023): 172
  - Density: 37.4/km^{2} (96.8/sq mi)
- Time zone: UTC+01:00 (CET)
  - Summer (DST): UTC+02:00 (CEST)
- INSEE/Postal code: 50124 /50370
- ^{1} French Land Register data, which excludes lakes, ponds, glaciers > 1 km^{2} (0.386 sq mi or 247 acres) and river estuaries.

La Chapelle-Urée (French pronunciation: [la ʃapɛl yʁe]) is a commune in the Manche department in Normandy in north-western France.

== See also ==
- Communes of the Manche department
