= Notre-Dame-de-Livoye =

- Commune
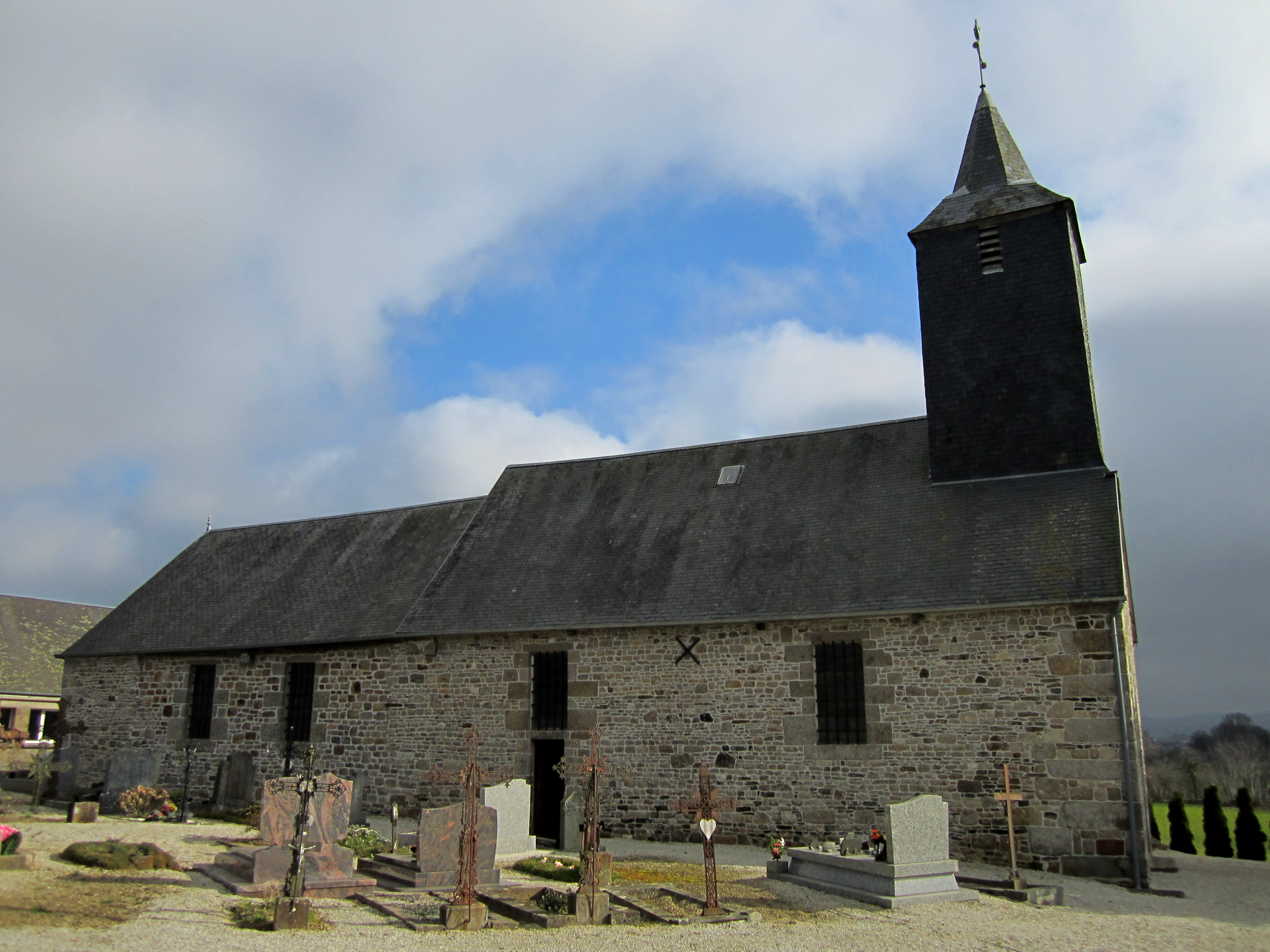
- The church of Notre-Dame
- Location of Notre-Dame-de-Livoye
- Location within France Location within Normandy
- Coordinates: 48°44′42″N 1°12′20″W
- Country: France
- Region: Normandy
- Department: Manche
- Arrondissement: Avranches
- Canton: Isigny-le-Buat
- Intercommunality: CA Mont-Saint-Michel-Normandie

Government
  - Mayor (2020–2026): Olivier Pjanic
- Area^{1}: 3.54 km^{2} (1.37 sq mi)
- Elevation: 89 m (292 ft)
- Highest elevation: 120 m (390 ft)
- Lowest elevation: 31 m (102 ft)
- Population (2023): 164
  - Density: 46.3/km^{2} (120/sq mi)
- Time zone: UTC+01:00 (CET)
  - Summer (DST): UTC+02:00 (CEST)
- INSEE/Postal code: 50379 /50370
- ^{1} French Land Register data, which excludes lakes, ponds, glaciers > 1 km^{2} (0.386 sq mi or 247 acres) and river estuaries.

Notre-Dame-de-Livoye (French pronunciation: [nɔtʁ dam də livwa]) is a commune in the Manche department in Normandy in north-western France.

== See also ==
- Communes of the Manche department
