= Saint-Jean-du-Corail-des-Bois =

- Commune
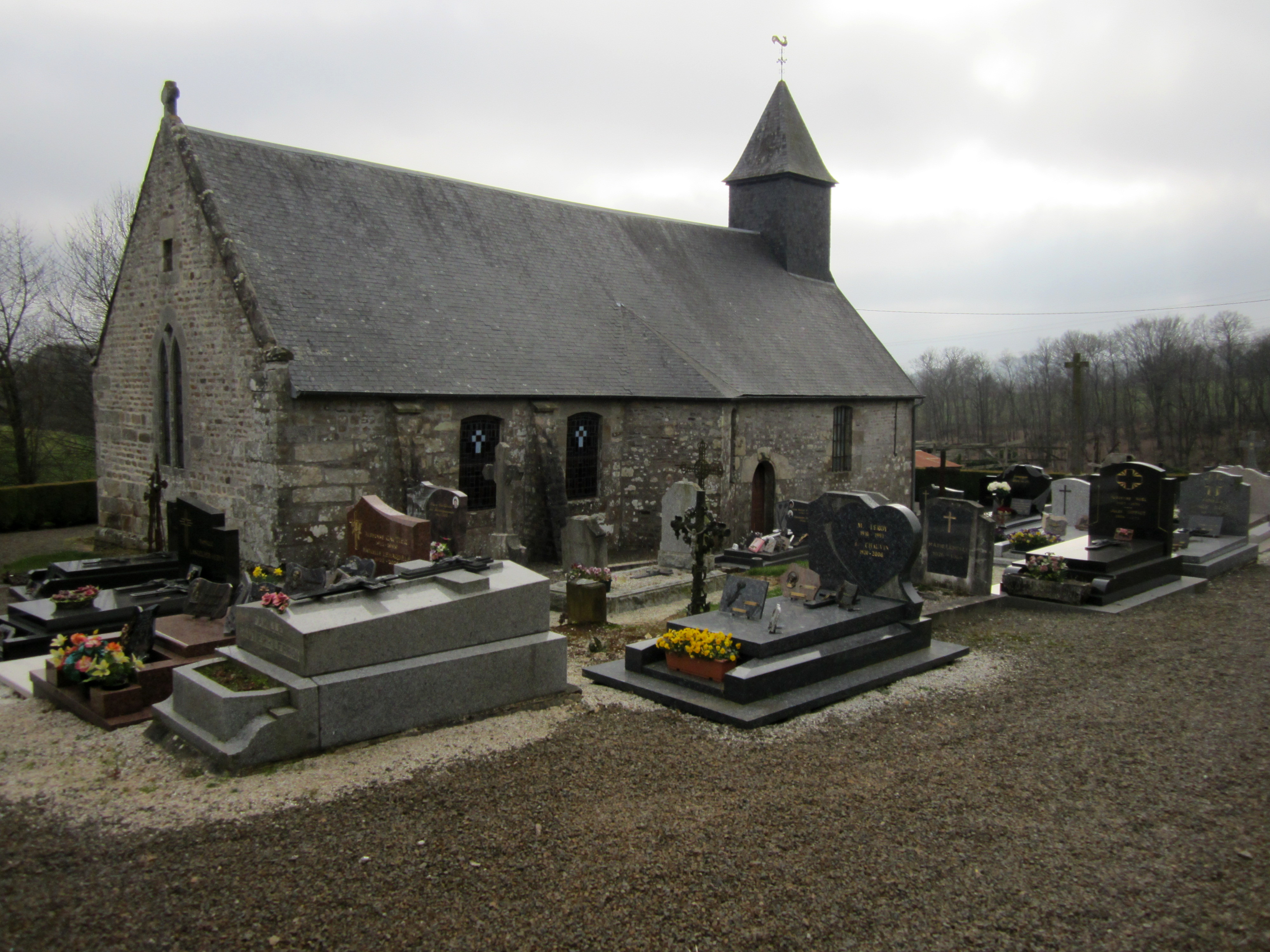
- The church of Saint-Jean-Baptiste
- Location of Saint-Jean-du-Corail-des-Bois
- Location within France Location within Normandy
- Coordinates: 48°46′06″N 1°12′00″W
- Country: France
- Region: Normandy
- Department: Manche
- Arrondissement: Avranches
- Canton: Isigny-le-Buat
- Intercommunality: CA Mont-Saint-Michel-Normandie

Government
  - Mayor (2020–2026): Jean-Claude Francois
- Area^{1}: 3.63 km^{2} (1.40 sq mi)
- Elevation: 116 m (381 ft)
- Highest elevation: 217 m (712 ft)
- Lowest elevation: 80 m (260 ft)
- Population (2023): 70
  - Density: 19/km^{2} (50/sq mi)
- Time zone: UTC+01:00 (CET)
  - Summer (DST): UTC+02:00 (CEST)
- INSEE/Postal code: 50495 /50370
- ^{1} French Land Register data, which excludes lakes, ponds, glaciers > 1 km^{2} (0.386 sq mi or 247 acres) and river estuaries.

Saint-Jean-du-Corail-des-Bois (French pronunciation: [sɛ̃ ʒɑ̃ dy kɔʁaj de bwa]) is a commune in the Manche department in Normandy in north-western France.

== See also ==
- Communes of the Manche department
