= Cuves, Manche =

Cuves
- Commune
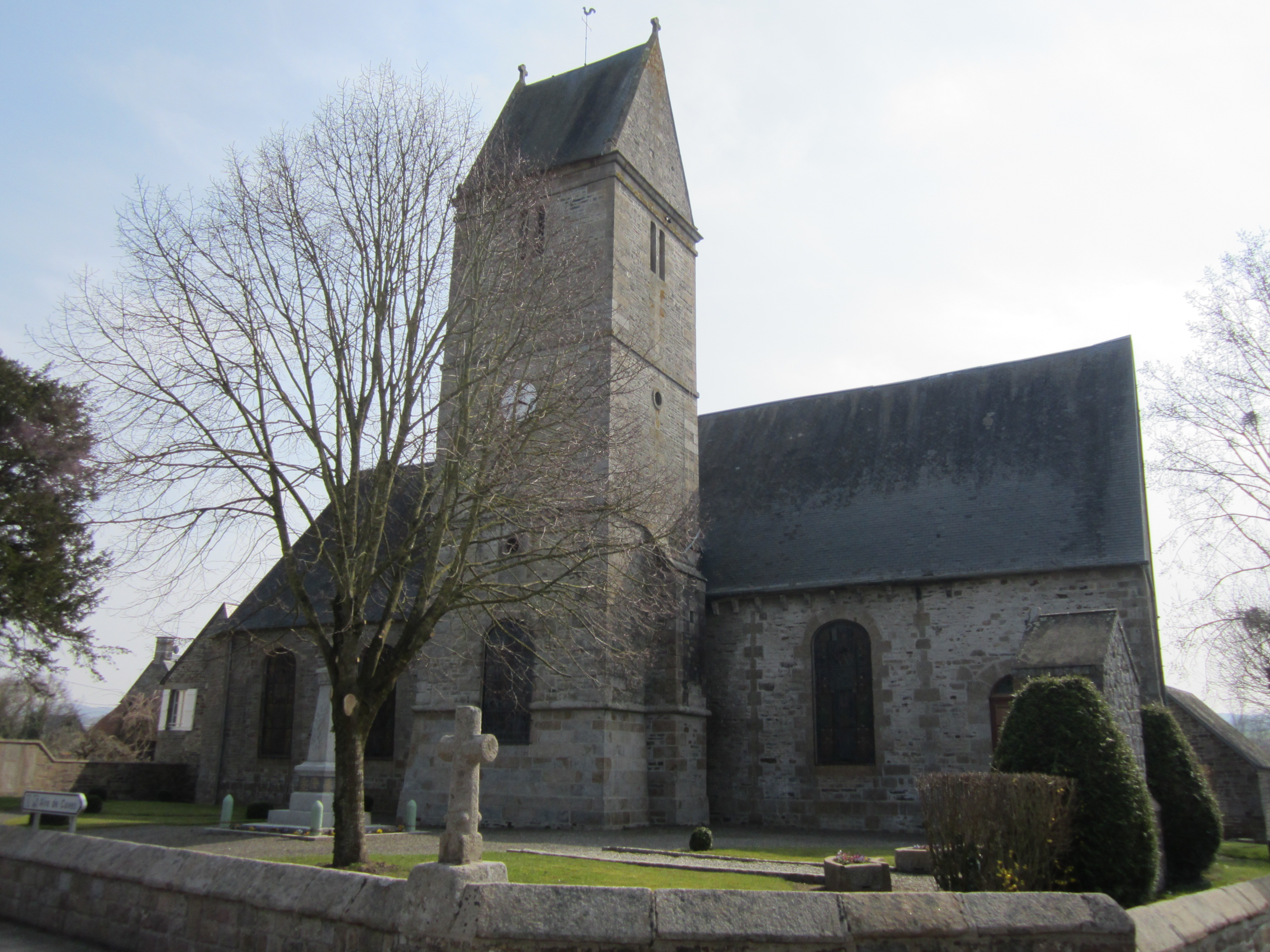
- The church of Saint-Denis
- Location of Cuves
- Location within France Location within Normandy
- Coordinates: 48°43′10″N 1°06′15″W
- Country: France
- Region: Normandy
- Department: Manche
- Arrondissement: Avranches
- Canton: Isigny-le-Buat
- Intercommunality: CA Mont-Saint-Michel-Normandie

Government
  - Mayor (2020–2026): Francis Turpin
- Area^{1}: 9.69 km^{2} (3.74 sq mi)
- Elevation: 67 m (220 ft)
- Highest elevation: 128 m (420 ft)
- Lowest elevation: 32 m (105 ft)
- Population (2023): 256
  - Density: 26.4/km^{2} (68.4/sq mi)
- Time zone: UTC+01:00 (CET)
  - Summer (DST): UTC+02:00 (CEST)
- INSEE/Postal code: 50158 /50670
- ^{1} French Land Register data, which excludes lakes, ponds, glaciers > 1 km^{2} (0.386 sq mi or 247 acres) and river estuaries.

Cuves (French pronunciation: [kyv]) is a commune in the Manche department in Normandy in north-western France.

== See also ==
- Communes of the Manche department
