= Saint-Nicolas-des-Bois, Manche =

Saint-Nicolas-des-Bois
- Commune
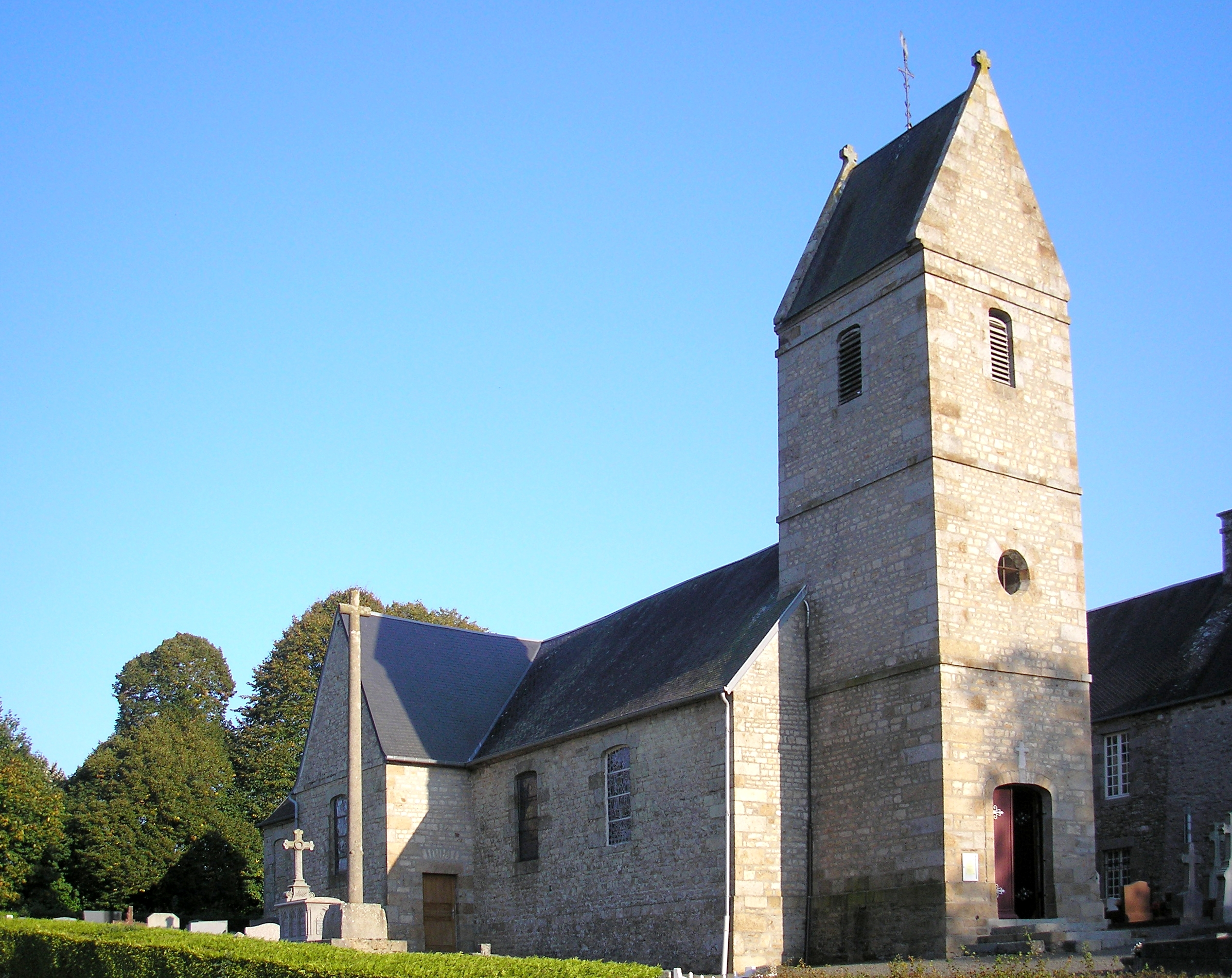
- The church of Saint-Nicolas
- Location of Saint-Nicolas-des-Bois
- Location within France Location within Normandy
- Coordinates: 48°45′24″N 1°11′34″W
- Country: France
- Region: Normandy
- Department: Manche
- Arrondissement: Avranches
- Canton: Isigny-le-Buat
- Intercommunality: CA Mont-Saint-Michel-Normandie

Government
  - Mayor (2020–2026): Béatrice Poret
- Area^{1}: 3.57 km^{2} (1.38 sq mi)
- Elevation: 88 m (289 ft)
- Highest elevation: 180 m (590 ft)
- Lowest elevation: 55 m (180 ft)
- Population (2023): 98
  - Density: 27/km^{2} (71/sq mi)
- Time zone: UTC+01:00 (CET)
  - Summer (DST): UTC+02:00 (CEST)
- INSEE/Postal code: 50529 /50370
- ^{1} French Land Register data, which excludes lakes, ponds, glaciers > 1 km^{2} (0.386 sq mi or 247 acres) and river estuaries.

Saint-Nicolas-des-Bois (French pronunciation: [sɛ̃ nikɔla de bwa]) is a commune in the Manche department in Normandy in north-western France.

== See also ==
- Communes of the Manche department
