= Canton of Isigny-le-Buat =

Coordinates: 48.62°N 1.17°W

The canton of Isigny-le-Buat is an administrative division of the Manche department, northwestern France. Its borders were modified at the French canton reorganisation which came into effect in March 2015. Its seat is in Isigny-le-Buat.

It consists of the following communes:

1. Avranches (partly)
2. Brécey
3. La Chaise-Baudouin
4. La Chapelle-Urée
5. Les Cresnays
6. Cuves
7. La Godefroy
8. Le Grand-Celland
9. Isigny-le-Buat
10. Juvigny les Vallées
11. Lingeard
12. Les Loges-sur-Brécey
13. Le Mesnil-Adelée
14. Le Mesnil-Gilbert
15. Notre-Dame-de-Livoye
16. Le Petit-Celland
17. Reffuveille
18. Saint-Brice
19. Saint-Georges-de-Livoye
20. Saint-Jean-du-Corail-des-Bois
21. Saint-Laurent-de-Cuves
22. Saint-Loup
23. Saint-Michel-de-Montjoie
24. Saint-Nicolas-des-Bois
25. Saint-Senier-sous-Avranches
26. Tirepied-sur-Sée
27. Vernix
