= Isigny-le-Buat =

- Commune
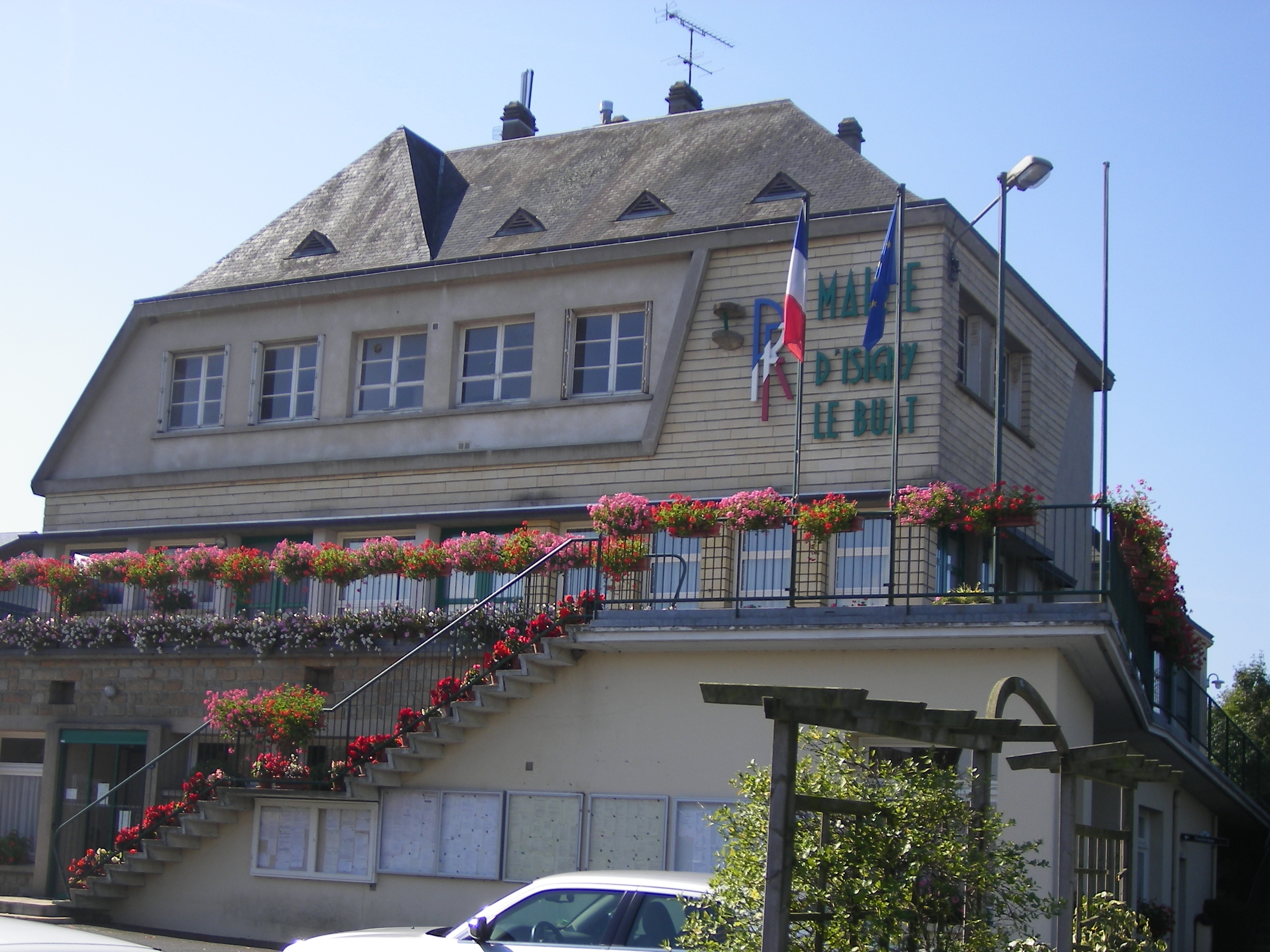
- Town hall
- Location of Isigny-le-Buat
- Location within France Location within Normandy
- Coordinates: 48°37′N 1°10′W
- Country: France
- Region: Normandy
- Department: Manche
- Arrondissement: Avranches
- Canton: Isigny-le-Buat
- Intercommunality: CA Mont-Saint-Michel-Normandie

Government
  - Mayor (2020–2026): Jessie Orvain
- Area^{1}: 73.31 km^{2} (28.31 sq mi)
- Elevation: 100 m (330 ft)
- Highest elevation: 215 m (705 ft)
- Lowest elevation: 23 m (75 ft)
- Population (2023): 3,183
  - Density: 43.42/km^{2} (112.5/sq mi)
- Time zone: UTC+01:00 (CET)
  - Summer (DST): UTC+02:00 (CEST)
- INSEE/Postal code: 50256 /50540
- ^{1} French Land Register data, which excludes lakes, ponds, glaciers > 1 km^{2} (0.386 sq mi or 247 acres) and river estuaries.

Isigny-le-Buat (French pronunciation: [iziɲi lə bɥa], before 1962: Isigny) is a commune in the Manche department in north-western France.

== Population ==
Historical population
Year	Pop.	±% p.a.
1968	3,537	—
1975	3,150	−1.64%
1982	3,147	−0.01%
1990	3,207	+0.24%
1999	3,050	−0.56%
2007	3,202	+0.61%
2012	3,321	+0.73%
2017	3,319	−0.01%
2023	3,183	−0.69%
Source: INSEE

== See also ==
- Communes of the Manche department
