= Brécey =

- Commune
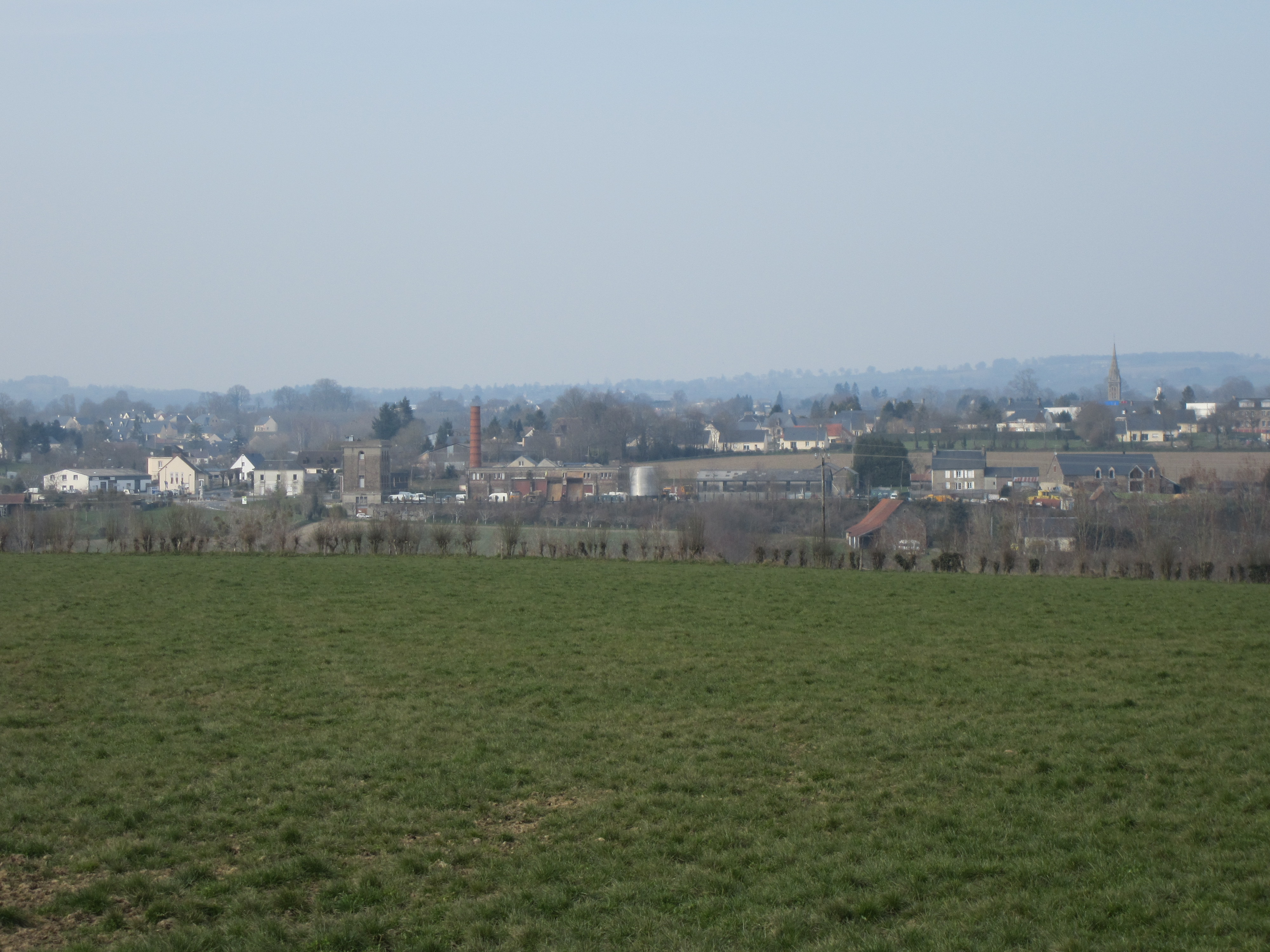
- View of Brécey and the Sée valley

- Coat of arms
- Location of Brécey
- Location within France Location within Normandy
- Coordinates: 48°43′32″N 1°09′55″W
- Country: France
- Region: Normandy
- Department: Manche
- Arrondissement: Avranches
- Canton: Isigny-le-Buat
- Intercommunality: CA Mont-Saint-Michel-Normandie

Government
  - Mayor (2020–2026): Philippe Aubrays
- Area^{1}: 20.96 km^{2} (8.09 sq mi)
- Elevation: 75 m (246 ft)
- Highest elevation: 111 m (364 ft)
- Lowest elevation: 22 m (72 ft)
- Population (2023): 2,172
  - Density: 103.6/km^{2} (268.4/sq mi)
- Time zone: UTC+01:00 (CET)
  - Summer (DST): UTC+02:00 (CEST)
- INSEE/Postal code: 50074 /50370
- ^{1} French Land Register data, which excludes lakes, ponds, glaciers > 1 km^{2} (0.386 sq mi or 247 acres) and river estuaries.

Brécey (French pronunciation: [bʁesɛ]) is a commune in the Manche department in Normandy in northwestern France. It is located on the crossing of the D999 and D911 roads.

Amenities include a cultural centre and the Collège Pierre Aguiton.

== Geography ==
=== Climate ===
Brécey has an oceanic climate (Köppen climate classification Cfb). The average annual temperature in Brécey is 11.2 °C (52.2 °F). The average annual rainfall is 1,100.0 mm (43.31 in) with November as the wettest month. The temperatures are highest on average in July, at around 17.7 °C (63.9 °F), and lowest in January, at around 5.2 °C (41.4 °F). The highest temperature ever recorded in Brécey was 35.1 °C (95.2 °F) on 5 August 2003; the coldest temperature ever recorded was −13.5 °C (7.7 °F) on 29 December 2005.

Climate data for Brécey (1981–2010 averages, extremes 1996−2013)
| Month | Jan | Feb | Mar | Apr | May | Jun | Jul | Aug | Sep | Oct | Nov | Dec | Year |
|---|---|---|---|---|---|---|---|---|---|---|---|---|---|
| Record high °C (°F) | 15.0 (59.0) | 18.5 (65.3) | 23.0 (73.4) | 27.1 (80.8) | 30.6 (87.1) | 33.3 (91.9) | 33.3 (91.9) | 35.1 (95.2) | 31.0 (87.8) | 29.2 (84.6) | 18.9 (66.0) | 16.1 (61.0) | 35.1 (95.2) |
| Mean daily maximum °C (°F) | 8.3 (46.9) | 9.7 (49.5) | 12.2 (54.0) | 15.0 (59.0) | 18.7 (65.7) | 21.7 (71.1) | 23.1 (73.6) | 23.2 (73.8) | 20.9 (69.6) | 16.5 (61.7) | 11.5 (52.7) | 8.2 (46.8) | 15.8 (60.4) |
| Daily mean °C (°F) | 5.2 (41.4) | 6.0 (42.8) | 7.8 (46.0) | 9.8 (49.6) | 13.5 (56.3) | 16.2 (61.2) | 17.7 (63.9) | 17.7 (63.9) | 15.3 (59.5) | 12.2 (54.0) | 7.8 (46.0) | 4.9 (40.8) | 11.2 (52.2) |
| Mean daily minimum °C (°F) | 2.2 (36.0) | 2.4 (36.3) | 3.3 (37.9) | 4.7 (40.5) | 8.3 (46.9) | 10.7 (51.3) | 12.4 (54.3) | 12.2 (54.0) | 9.6 (49.3) | 8.0 (46.4) | 4.1 (39.4) | 1.7 (35.1) | 6.7 (44.1) |
| Record low °C (°F) | −12.3 (9.9) | −10.6 (12.9) | −9.2 (15.4) | −4.8 (23.4) | −1.5 (29.3) | 1.4 (34.5) | 4.8 (40.6) | 2.9 (37.2) | 0.0 (32.0) | −4.8 (23.4) | −7.9 (17.8) | −13.5 (7.7) | −13.5 (7.7) |
| Average precipitation mm (inches) | 96.2 (3.79) | 85.6 (3.37) | 80.1 (3.15) | 75.1 (2.96) | 84.4 (3.32) | 61.7 (2.43) | 83.7 (3.30) | 77.4 (3.05) | 80.6 (3.17) | 120.5 (4.74) | 130.3 (5.13) | 124.4 (4.90) | 1,100 (43.31) |
| Average precipitation days (≥ 1.0 mm) | 15.7 | 12.5 | 12.4 | 12.1 | 11.6 | 9.5 | 11.5 | 10.3 | 10.5 | 14.8 | 16.8 | 14.9 | 152.7 |
Source: Meteociel

== Population ==
Historical population

| Year | Pop. | ±% p.a. |
|---|---|---|
| 1793 | 2,100 | — |
| 1821 | 2,190 | +0.15% |
| 1846 | 2,466 | +0.48% |
| 1872 | 2,300 | −0.27% |
| 1901 | 2,294 | −0.01% |
| 1926 | 2,141 | −0.28% |
| 1946 | 2,247 | +0.24% |
| 1962 | 2,026 | −0.64% |
| 1968 | 2,046 | +0.16% |

| Year | Pop. | ±% p.a. |
|---|---|---|
| 1975 | 1,958 | −0.63% |
| 1982 | 1,980 | +0.16% |
| 1990 | 2,029 | +0.31% |
| 1999 | 2,113 | +0.45% |
| 2007 | 2,154 | +0.24% |
| 2012 | 2,142 | −0.11% |
| 2017 | 2,120 | −0.21% |
| 2023 | 2,172 | +0.40% |

Source: EHESS and INSEE (1968-2023)

== Heraldry ==
| Arms of Brécey | The arms of Brécey are blazoned : Ermine, a lion (rampant) gules. |

== See also ==
- Communes of the Manche department
