= Mouche =

Mouche may refer to:

== Fashion ==
- Mouche, an artificial beauty mark fashionable in Europe in the 16th and 17th centuries
- Soul patch, or mouche, a small patch of hair just below the lower lip

== Arts and entertainment ==
- Mouche (unfinished film), an incomplete film by French director Marcel Carné
- "The Fly" (Langelaan short story) (La Mouche), a 1957 science fiction horror short story by George Langelaan
- The Flies (Les Mouches), a 1943 play by Jean-Paul Sartre
- Mouche, a 2019 French remake of British TV series Fleabag
- Mouche, a fictional character in the 1943 film Five Graves to Cairo
- Mouche (card game), or Lanterlu
- "La Mouche", a 1999 single by Cassius
- Mouche, one of the drone strings on a Hurdy-Gurdy

== People ==
- Mohamed Amra (born 1994), French criminal nicknamed La Mouche ("The Fly")
- Mouche Phillips (born 1973), Australian actress
- Edmond Mouche (1899–1989), French racing driver
- Pablo Mouche (born 1987), Argentine footballer
- Yohanna Petros Mouche (born 1943), Iraqi Syriac Roman Catholic prelate

== Places ==
- La Mouche, Manche, France
- La Mouche, Lyon, France

== See also ==
- Bateaux Mouches, tourist boats in Paris
- Mouche No. 2-class schooner-avisos, 19th century French navy ships
