= Muneville =

Muneville may refer to the following places in the Manche département, France:

- Muneville-le-Bingard
- Muneville-sur-Mer
