= Subligny =

Subligny may refer to the following places in France:

- Subligny, Cher, a commune in the department of Cher
- Subligny, Manche, a commune in the department of Manche
- Subligny, Yonne, a commune in the department of Yonne
