= Les Chambres =

- Part of Le Grippon
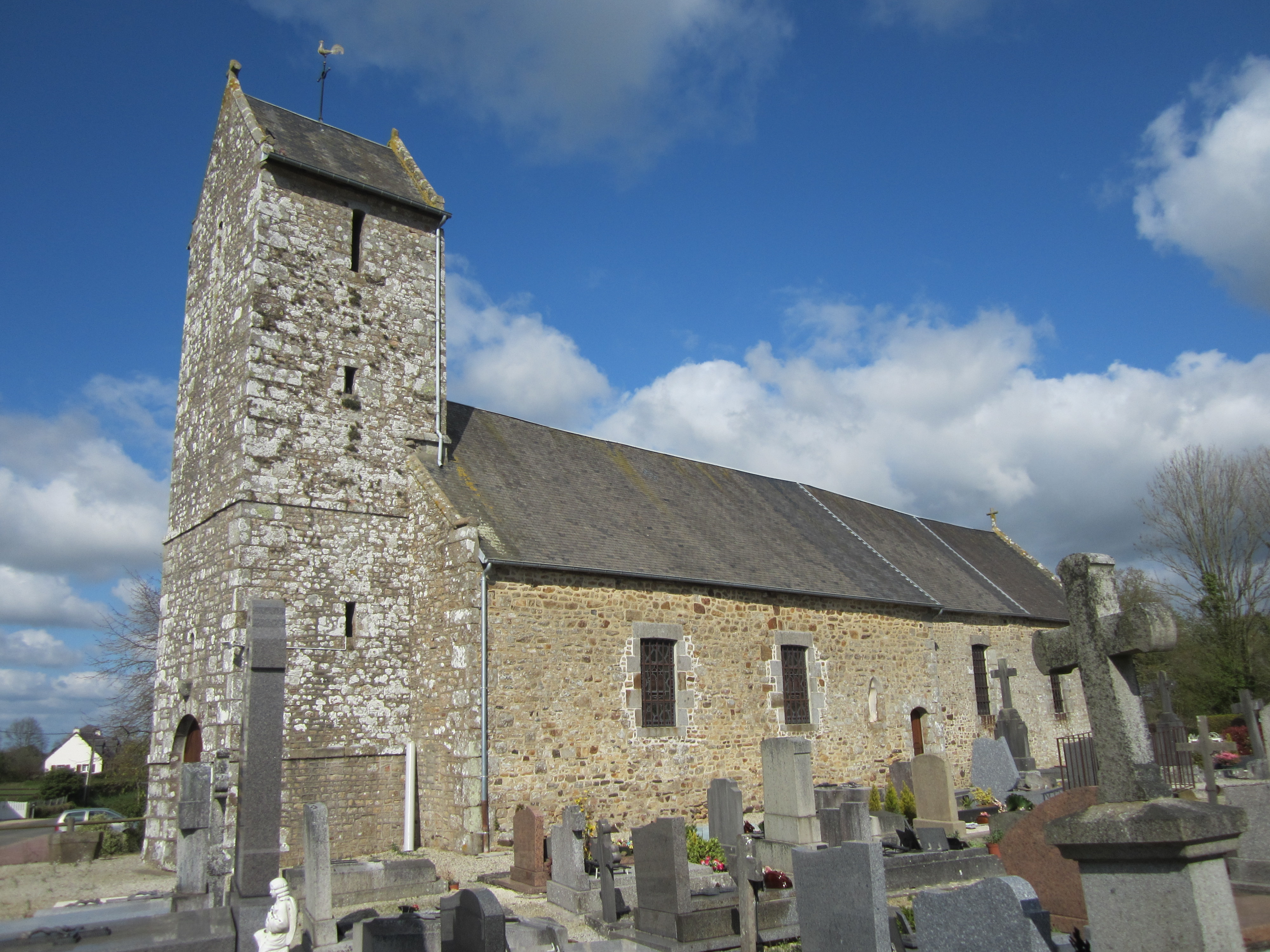
- The church of Sainte-Trinité
- Location of Les Chambres
- Location within France Location within Normandy
- Coordinates: 48°46′02″N 1°23′12″W
- Country: France
- Region: Normandy
- Department: Manche
- Arrondissement: Avranches
- Canton: Bréhal
- Commune: Le Grippon
- Area^{1}: 4.18 km^{2} (1.61 sq mi)
- Elevation: 136 m (446 ft)
- Highest elevation: 133 m (436 ft)
- Lowest elevation: 68 m (223 ft)
- Population (2013): 137
  - Density: 32.8/km^{2} (84.9/sq mi)
- Time zone: UTC+01:00 (CET)
  - Summer (DST): UTC+02:00 (CEST)
- Postal code: 50320
- ^{1} French Land Register data, which excludes lakes, ponds, glaciers > 1 km^{2} (0.386 sq mi or 247 acres) and river estuaries.

Les Chambres (French pronunciation: [le ʃɑ̃bʁ]) is a former commune in the Manche department in Normandy in north-western France. On 1 January 2016, it was merged into the new commune of Le Grippon.

== See also ==
- Communes of the Manche department
