= Saint-Jean-des-Champs =

- Commune
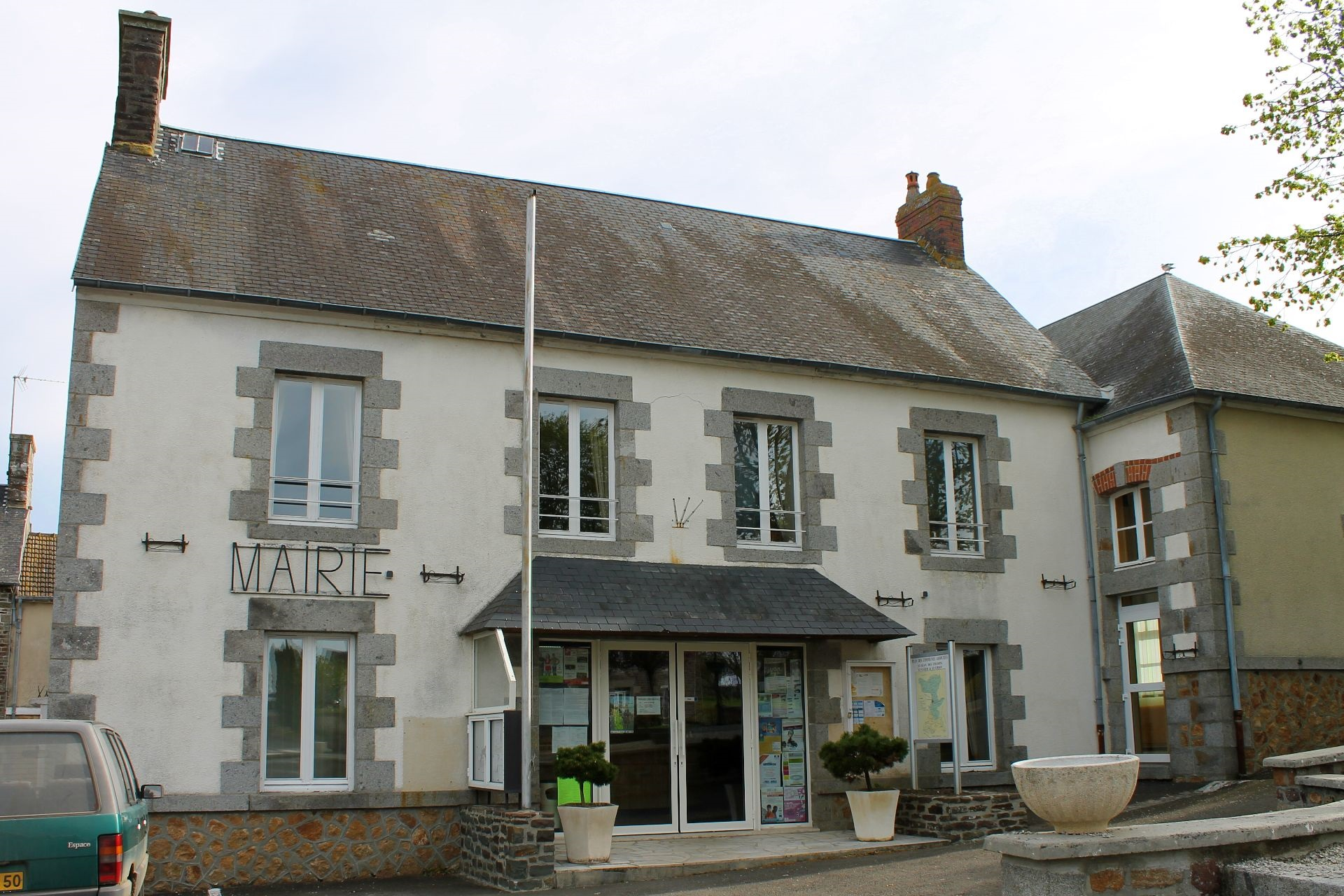
- The town hall
- Location of Saint-Jean-des-Champs
- Location within France Location within Normandy
- Coordinates: 48°49′42″N 1°27′49″W
- Country: France
- Region: Normandy
- Department: Manche
- Arrondissement: Avranches
- Canton: Bréhal
- Intercommunality: Granville, Terre et Mer

Government
  - Mayor (2020–2026): Catherine Hersent
- Area^{1}: 19.4 km^{2} (7.5 sq mi)
- Elevation: 100 m (330 ft)
- Highest elevation: 122 m (400 ft)
- Lowest elevation: 21 m (69 ft)
- Population (2023): 1,534
  - Density: 79.1/km^{2} (205/sq mi)
- Time zone: UTC+01:00 (CET)
  - Summer (DST): UTC+02:00 (CEST)
- INSEE/Postal code: 50493 /50320
- ^{1} French Land Register data, which excludes lakes, ponds, glaciers > 1 km^{2} (0.386 sq mi or 247 acres) and river estuaries.

Saint-Jean-des-Champs (French pronunciation: [sɛ̃ ʒɑ̃ de ʃɑ̃]) is a commune in the Manche department in Normandy in north-western France.

== See also ==
- Communes of the Manche department
