= Beauchamps, Manche =

Beauchamps
- Commune
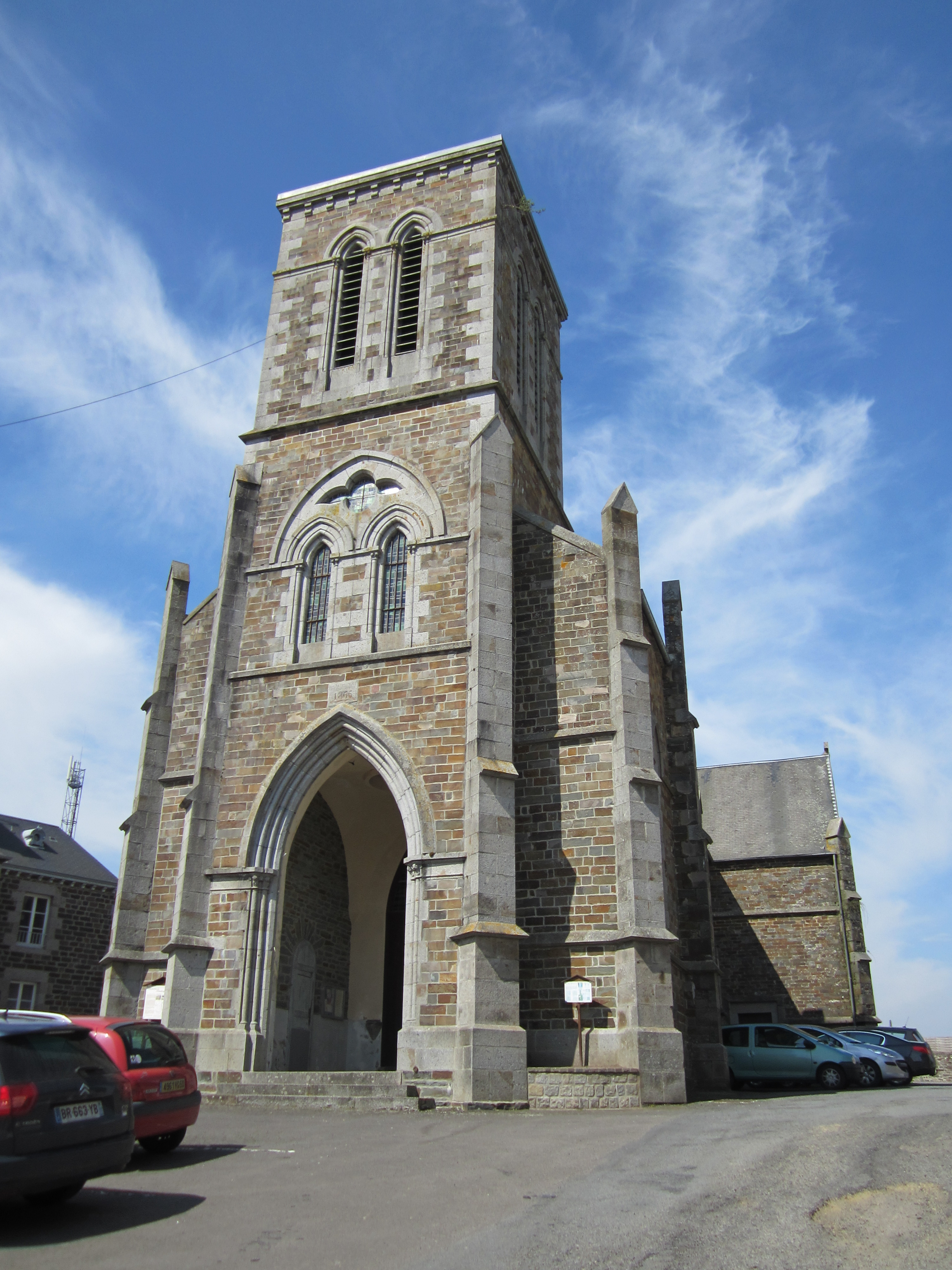
- The church of Saint-Crespin
- Location of Beauchamps
- Location within France Location within Normandy
- Coordinates: 48°49′59″N 1°21′28″W
- Country: France
- Region: Normandy
- Department: Manche
- Arrondissement: Avranches
- Canton: Bréhal

Government
  - Mayor (2020–2026): Jacques Canuet
- Area^{1}: 4.10 km^{2} (1.58 sq mi)
- Elevation: 103 m (338 ft)
- Highest elevation: 136 m (446 ft)
- Lowest elevation: 52 m (171 ft)
- Population (2023): 441
  - Density: 108/km^{2} (279/sq mi)
- Time zone: UTC+01:00 (CET)
  - Summer (DST): UTC+02:00 (CEST)
- INSEE/Postal code: 50038 /50320
- ^{1} French Land Register data, which excludes lakes, ponds, glaciers > 1 km^{2} (0.386 sq mi or 247 acres) and river estuaries.

Beauchamps (French pronunciation: [boʃɑ̃]) is a commune in the Manche department in the Normandy region in northwestern France.

== Population ==
Historical population
Year	Pop.	±% p.a.
1968	348	—
1975	314	−1.46%
1982	299	−0.70%
1990	314	+0.61%
1999	354	+1.34%
2007	382	+0.96%
2012	371	−0.58%
2017	408	+1.92%
2023	441	+1.30%
Source: INSEE

== See also ==
- Communes of the Manche department
