= Bréville-sur-Mer =

- Commune
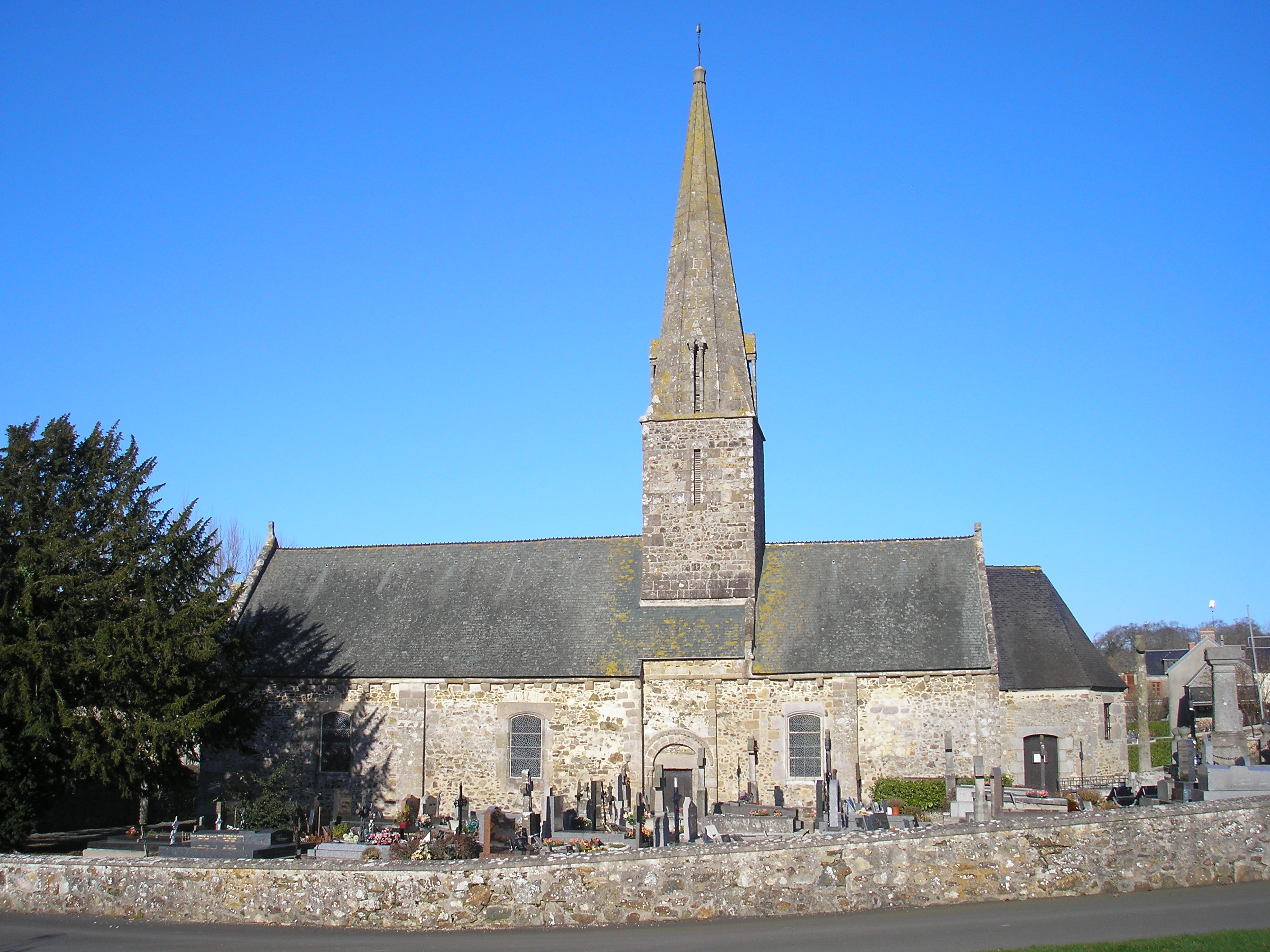
- The church of Notre-Dame
- Location of Bréville-sur-Mer
- Location within France Location within Normandy
- Coordinates: 48°51′54″N 1°33′19″W
- Country: France
- Region: Normandy
- Department: Manche
- Arrondissement: Avranches
- Canton: Bréhal

Government
  - Mayor (2022–2026): Jacques Boutouyrie
- Area^{1}: 6.86 km^{2} (2.65 sq mi)
- Elevation: 70 m (230 ft)
- Highest elevation: 69 m (226 ft)
- Lowest elevation: 0 m (0 ft)
- Population (2023): 791
  - Density: 115/km^{2} (299/sq mi)
- Time zone: UTC+01:00 (CET)
  - Summer (DST): UTC+02:00 (CEST)
- INSEE/Postal code: 50081 /50290
- ^{1} French Land Register data, which excludes lakes, ponds, glaciers > 1 km^{2} (0.386 sq mi or 247 acres) and river estuaries.

Bréville-sur-Mer (French pronunciation: [bʁevil syʁ mɛʁ], literally Bréville on Sea) is a commune in the Manche department in Normandy in northwestern France.

== Population ==
Historical population
Year	Pop.	±% p.a.
1968	332	—
1975	480	+5.41%
1982	570	+2.49%
1990	530	−0.91%
1999	611	+1.59%
2007	809	+3.57%
2012	802	−0.17%
2017	778	−0.61%
2023	791	+0.28%
Source: INSEE

== Sport ==
The Granville golf course is located here.

== See also ==
- Communes of the Manche department
