= Coudeville-sur-Mer =

- Commune
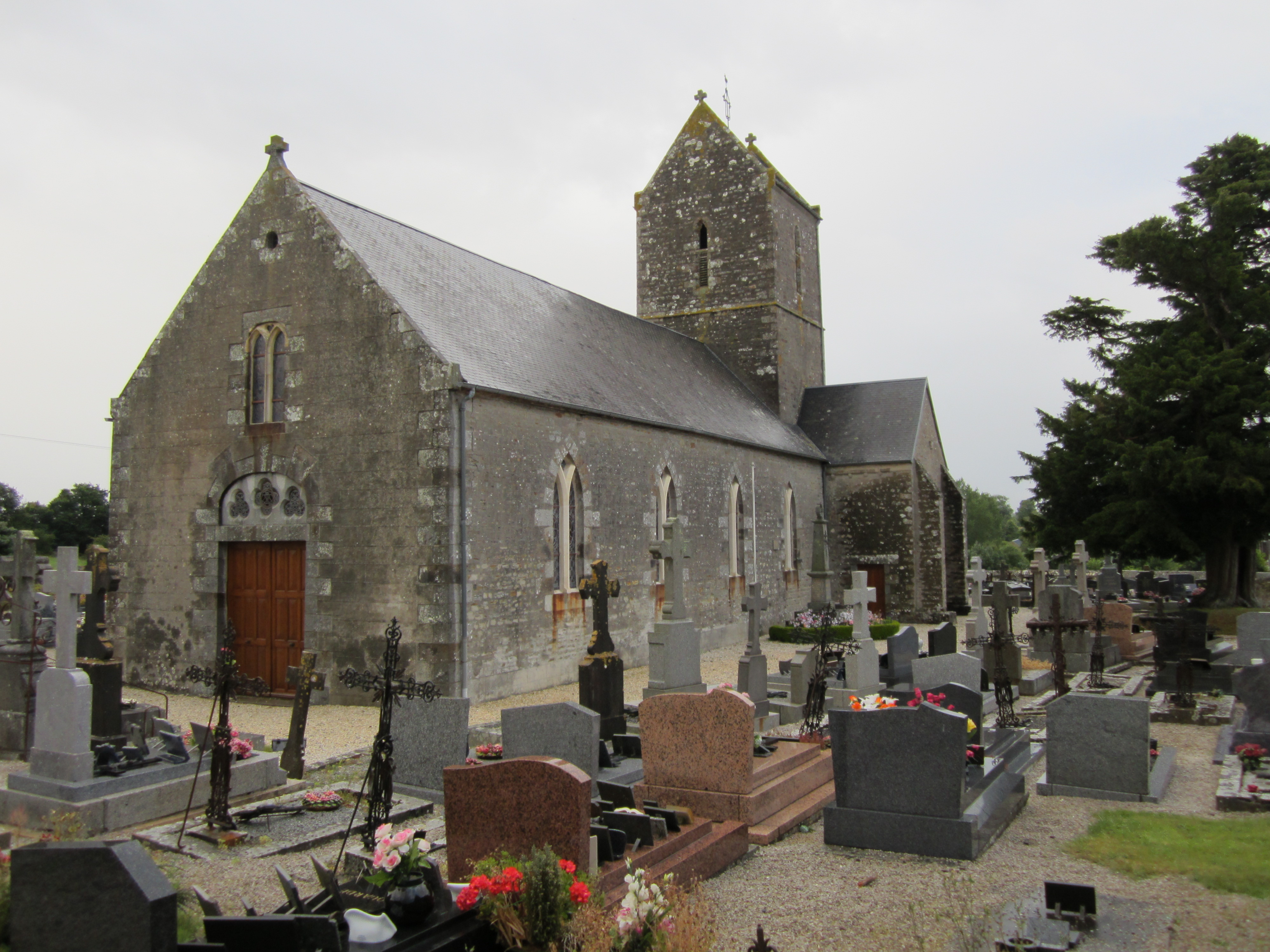
- The church of Saint-Georges
- Location of Coudeville-sur-Mer
- Location within France Location within Normandy
- Coordinates: 48°52′55″N 1°31′33″W
- Country: France
- Region: Normandy
- Department: Manche
- Arrondissement: Avranches
- Canton: Bréhal
- Intercommunality: Granville, Terre et Mer

Government
  - Mayor (2020–2026): Philippe Desquesnes
- Area^{1}: 8.7 km^{2} (3.4 sq mi)
- Elevation: 46 m (151 ft)
- Highest elevation: 69 m (226 ft)
- Lowest elevation: 3 m (9.8 ft)
- Population (2023): 887
  - Density: 100/km^{2} (260/sq mi)
- Demonym: Coudevillais
- Time zone: UTC+01:00 (CET)
  - Summer (DST): UTC+02:00 (CEST)
- INSEE/Postal code: 50143 /50290
- ^{1} French Land Register data, which excludes lakes, ponds, glaciers > 1 km^{2} (0.386 sq mi or 247 acres) and river estuaries.

Coudeville-sur-Mer (French pronunciation: [kudvil syʁ mɛʁ], literally Coudeville on Sea, before 1995: Coudeville) is a commune in the Manche department in Normandy in north-western France.

== See also ==
- Communes of the Manche department
