= Équilly =

- Commune
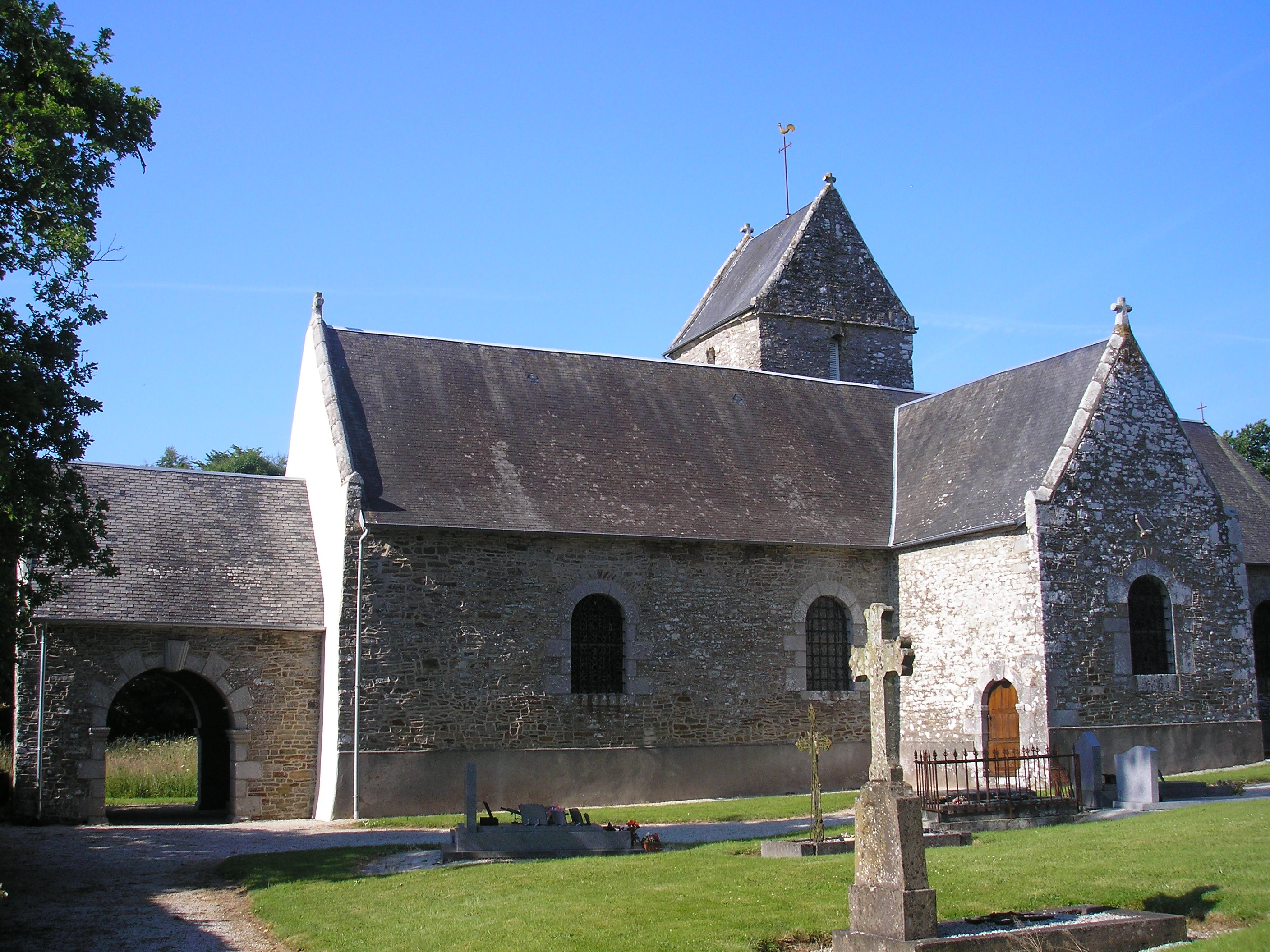
- St. Anne's Church
- Location of Équilly
- Location within France Location within Normandy
- Coordinates: 48°50′27″N 1°23′09″W
- Country: France
- Region: Normandy
- Department: Manche
- Arrondissement: Avranches
- Canton: Bréhal

Government
  - Mayor (2020–2026): Claire Rousseau
- Area^{1}: 5.65 km^{2} (2.18 sq mi)
- Elevation: 121 m (397 ft)
- Highest elevation: 134 m (440 ft)
- Lowest elevation: 54 m (177 ft)
- Population (2023): 194
  - Density: 34.3/km^{2} (88.9/sq mi)
- Time zone: UTC+01:00 (CET)
  - Summer (DST): UTC+02:00 (CEST)
- INSEE/Postal code: 50174 /50320
- ^{1} French Land Register data, which excludes lakes, ponds, glaciers > 1 km^{2} (0.386 sq mi or 247 acres) and river estuaries.

Équilly (French pronunciation: [ekiji]) is a commune in the Manche department in Normandy in north-western France.

== See also ==
- Communes of the Manche department
