= Le Mesnil-Aubert =

- Commune
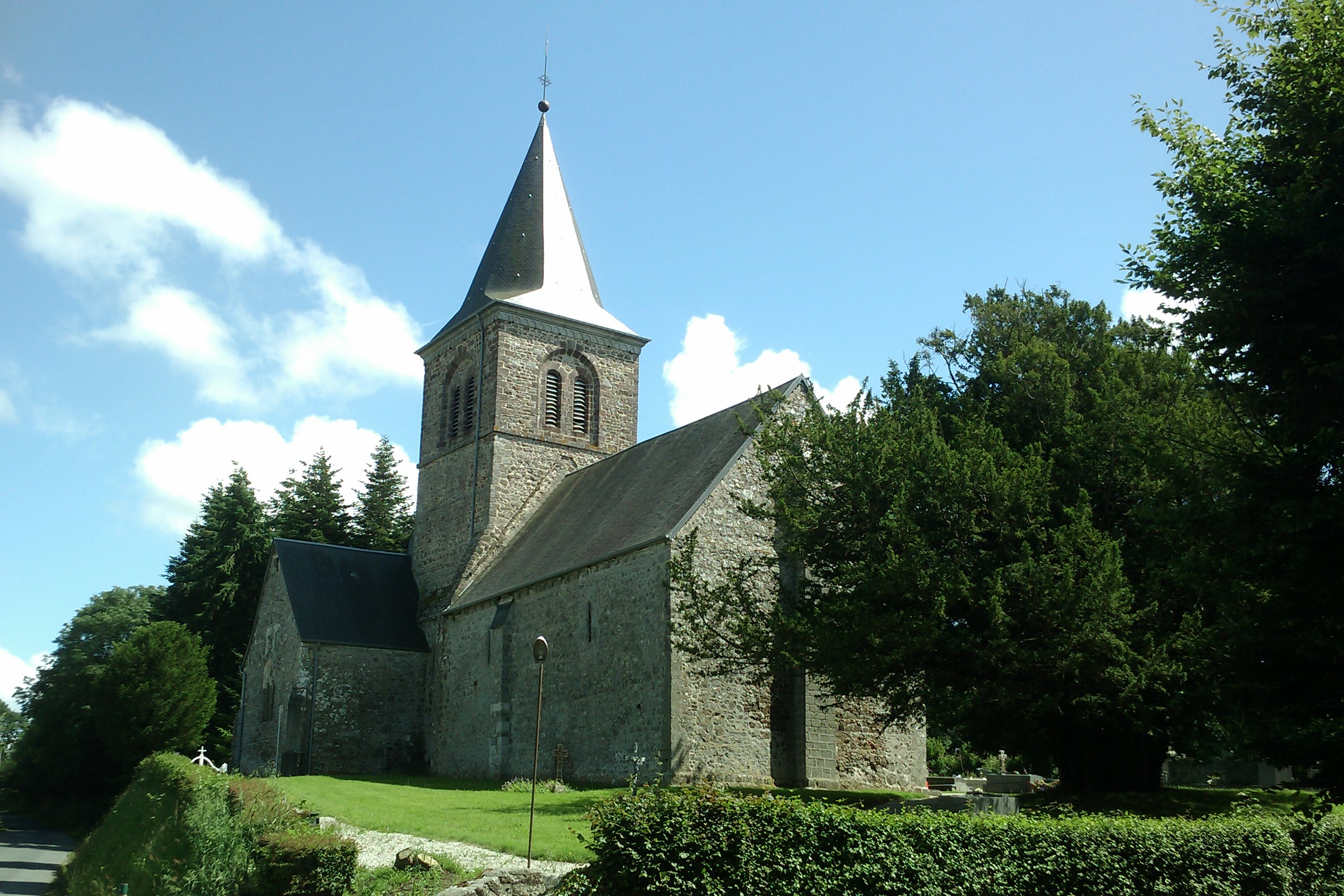
- The church of Saint-Pierre
- Location of Le Mesnil-Aubert
- Location within France Location within Normandy
- Coordinates: 48°56′49″N 1°24′44″W
- Country: France
- Region: Normandy
- Department: Manche
- Arrondissement: Avranches
- Canton: Bréhal
- Intercommunality: Granville, Terre et Mer

Government
  - Mayor (2020–2026): Catherine Simon
- Area^{1}: 5.96 km^{2} (2.30 sq mi)
- Elevation: 20 m (66 ft)
- Highest elevation: 117 m (384 ft)
- Lowest elevation: 14 m (46 ft)
- Population (2023): 197
  - Density: 33.1/km^{2} (85.6/sq mi)
- Time zone: UTC+01:00 (CET)
  - Summer (DST): UTC+02:00 (CEST)
- INSEE/Postal code: 50304 /50510
- ^{1} French Land Register data, which excludes lakes, ponds, glaciers > 1 km^{2} (0.386 sq mi or 247 acres) and river estuaries.

Le Mesnil-Aubert (French pronunciation: [lə menil obɛʁ]) is a commune in the Manche department in Normandy in north-western France.

== See also ==
- Communes of the Manche department
