= Hocquigny =

- Commune
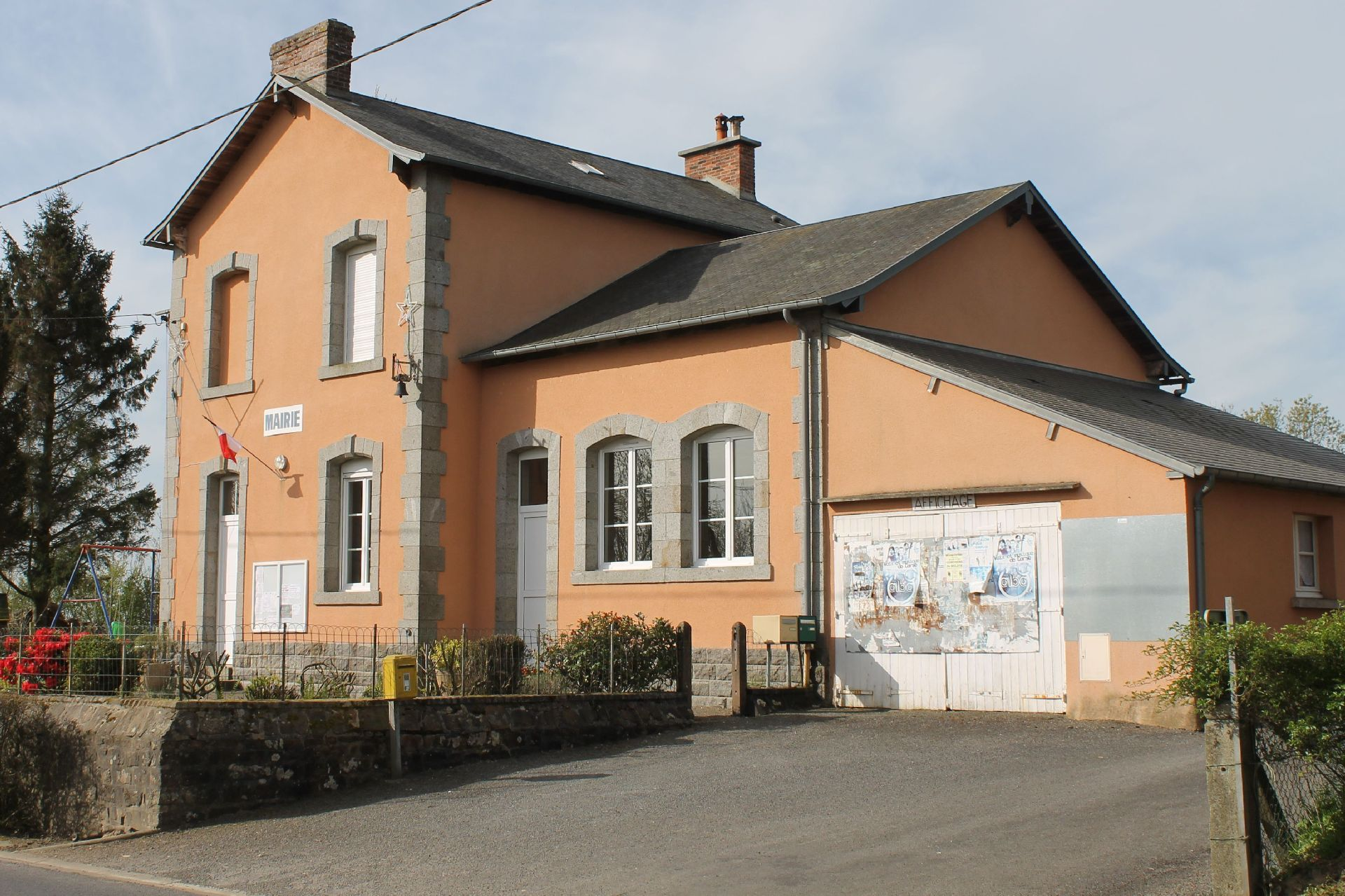
- Town hall
- Location of Hocquigny
- Location within France Location within Normandy
- Coordinates: 48°48′51″N 1°24′15″W
- Country: France
- Region: Normandy
- Department: Manche
- Arrondissement: Avranches
- Canton: Bréhal
- Intercommunality: Granville, Terre et Mer

Government
  - Mayor (2020–2026): Arnaud Martinet
- Area^{1}: 3.05 km^{2} (1.18 sq mi)
- Elevation: 126 m (413 ft)
- Highest elevation: 126 m (413 ft)
- Lowest elevation: 67 m (220 ft)
- Population (2023): 196
  - Density: 64.3/km^{2} (166/sq mi)
- Time zone: UTC+01:00 (CET)
  - Summer (DST): UTC+02:00 (CEST)
- INSEE/Postal code: 50247 /50320
- ^{1} French Land Register data, which excludes lakes, ponds, glaciers > 1 km^{2} (0.386 sq mi or 247 acres) and river estuaries.

Hocquigny (French pronunciation: [ɔkiɲi]) is a commune in the Manche department in north-western France. As of 2019, the population of Hocquigny was 188 people.

== See also ==
- Communes of the Manche department
