= Saint-Aubin-des-Préaux =

- Commune
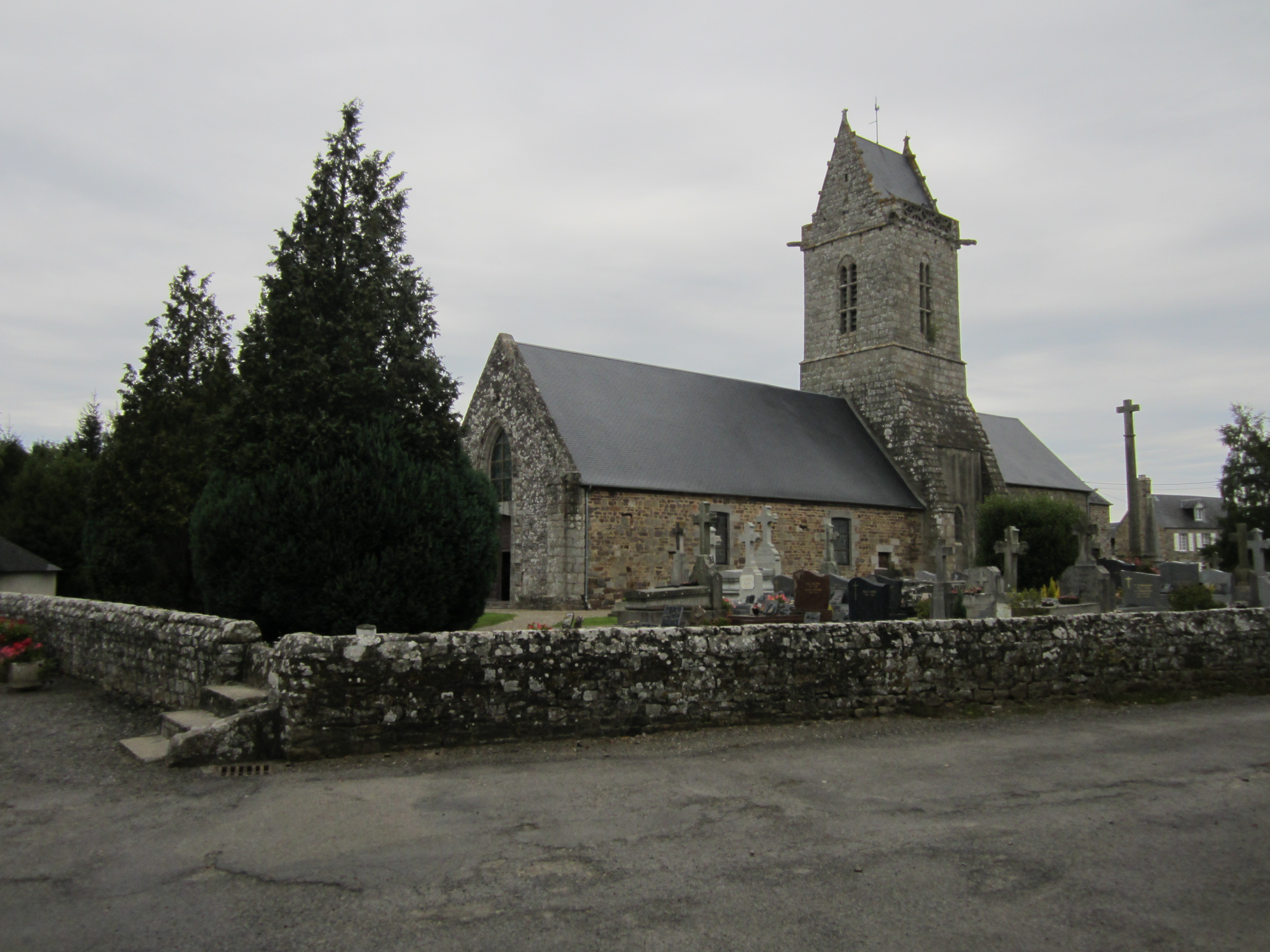
- Saint-Aubin church
- Location of Saint-Aubin-des-Préaux
- Location within France Location within Normandy
- Coordinates: 48°48′18″N 1°30′24″W
- Country: France
- Region: Normandy
- Department: Manche
- Arrondissement: Avranches
- Canton: Bréhal

Government
  - Mayor (2020–2026): Daniel Huet
- Area^{1}: 8.24 km^{2} (3.18 sq mi)
- Elevation: 120 m (390 ft)
- Highest elevation: 94 m (308 ft)
- Lowest elevation: 11 m (36 ft)
- Population (2023): 488
  - Density: 59.2/km^{2} (153/sq mi)
- Demonym: Saint-Aubinais
- Time zone: UTC+01:00 (CET)
  - Summer (DST): UTC+02:00 (CEST)
- INSEE/Postal code: 50447 /50380
- ^{1} French Land Register data, which excludes lakes, ponds, glaciers > 1 km^{2} (0.386 sq mi or 247 acres) and river estuaries.

Saint-Aubin-des-Préaux (French pronunciation: [sɛ̃.t‿obɛ̃ de pʁeo]) is a commune in the Manche department in Normandy in north-western France.

== See also ==
- Communes of the Manche department
