= Anctoville-sur-Boscq =

- Commune
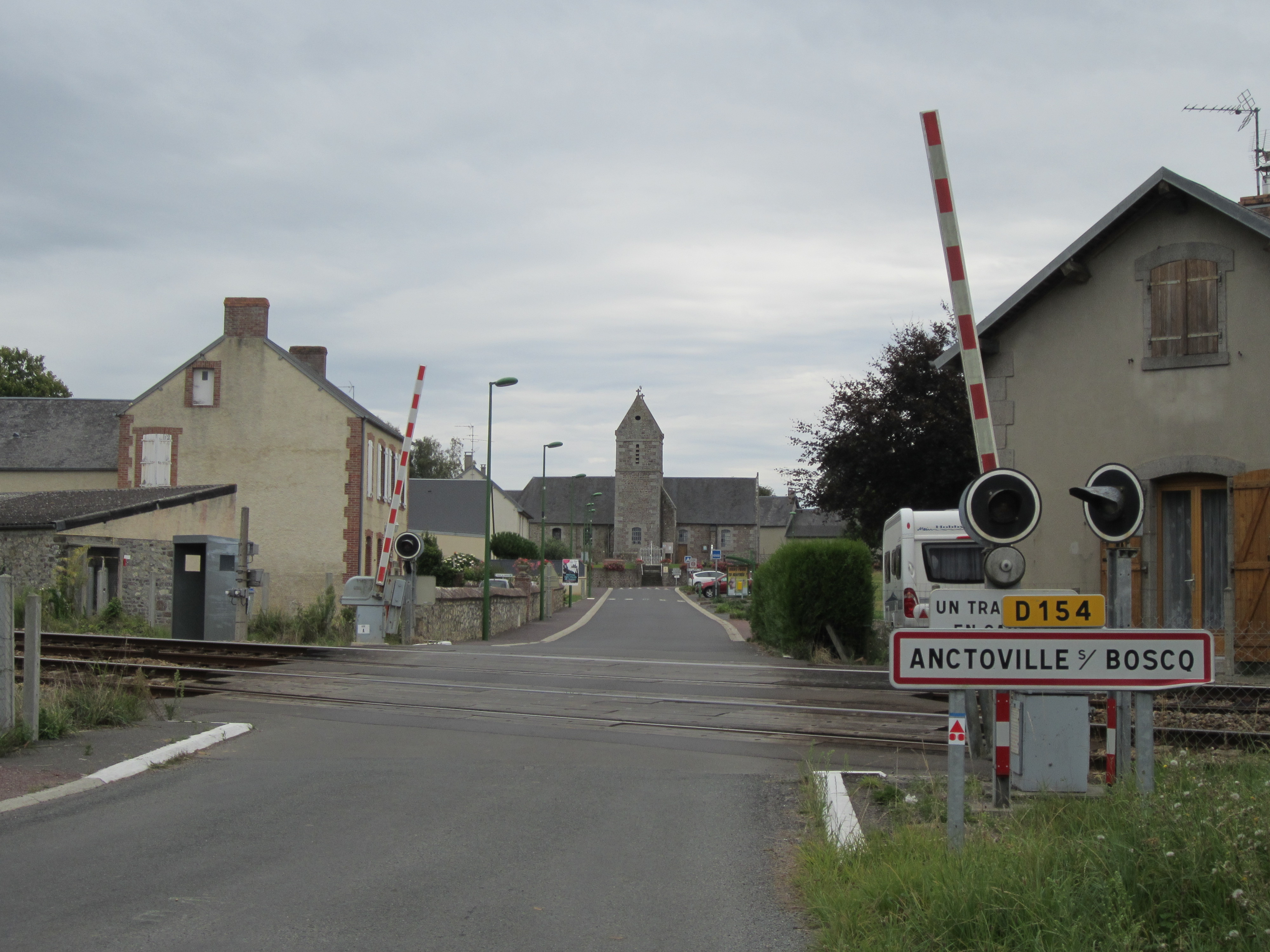
- Railway crossing and road into Anctoville-sur-Boscq
- Location of Anctoville-sur-Boscq
- Location within France Location within Normandy
- Coordinates: 48°50′41″N 1°31′52″W
- Country: France
- Region: Normandy
- Department: Manche
- Arrondissement: Avranches
- Canton: Bréhal
- Intercommunality: Granville, Terre et Mer

Government
  - Mayor (2020–2026): François Lemoine
- Area^{1}: 2.15 km^{2} (0.83 sq mi)
- Elevation: 49 m (161 ft)
- Highest elevation: 69 m (226 ft)
- Lowest elevation: 22 m (72 ft)
- Population (2023): 435
  - Density: 202/km^{2} (524/sq mi)
- Time zone: UTC+01:00 (CET)
  - Summer (DST): UTC+02:00 (CEST)
- INSEE/Postal code: 50008 /50400
- ^{1} French Land Register data, which excludes lakes, ponds, glaciers > 1 km^{2} (0.386 sq mi or 247 acres) and river estuaries.

Anctoville-sur-Boscq is a commune in the Manche department in the Normandy region in northwestern France.

== Population ==
Historical population
Year	Pop.	±% p.a.
1968	98	—
1975	111	+1.80%
1982	178	+6.98%
1990	285	+6.06%
1999	418	+4.35%
2007	558	+3.68%
2012	490	−2.57%
2017	450	−1.69%
2023	435	−0.56%
Source: INSEE

== See also ==
- Communes of the Manche department
