= Longueville, Manche =

Longueville
- Commune
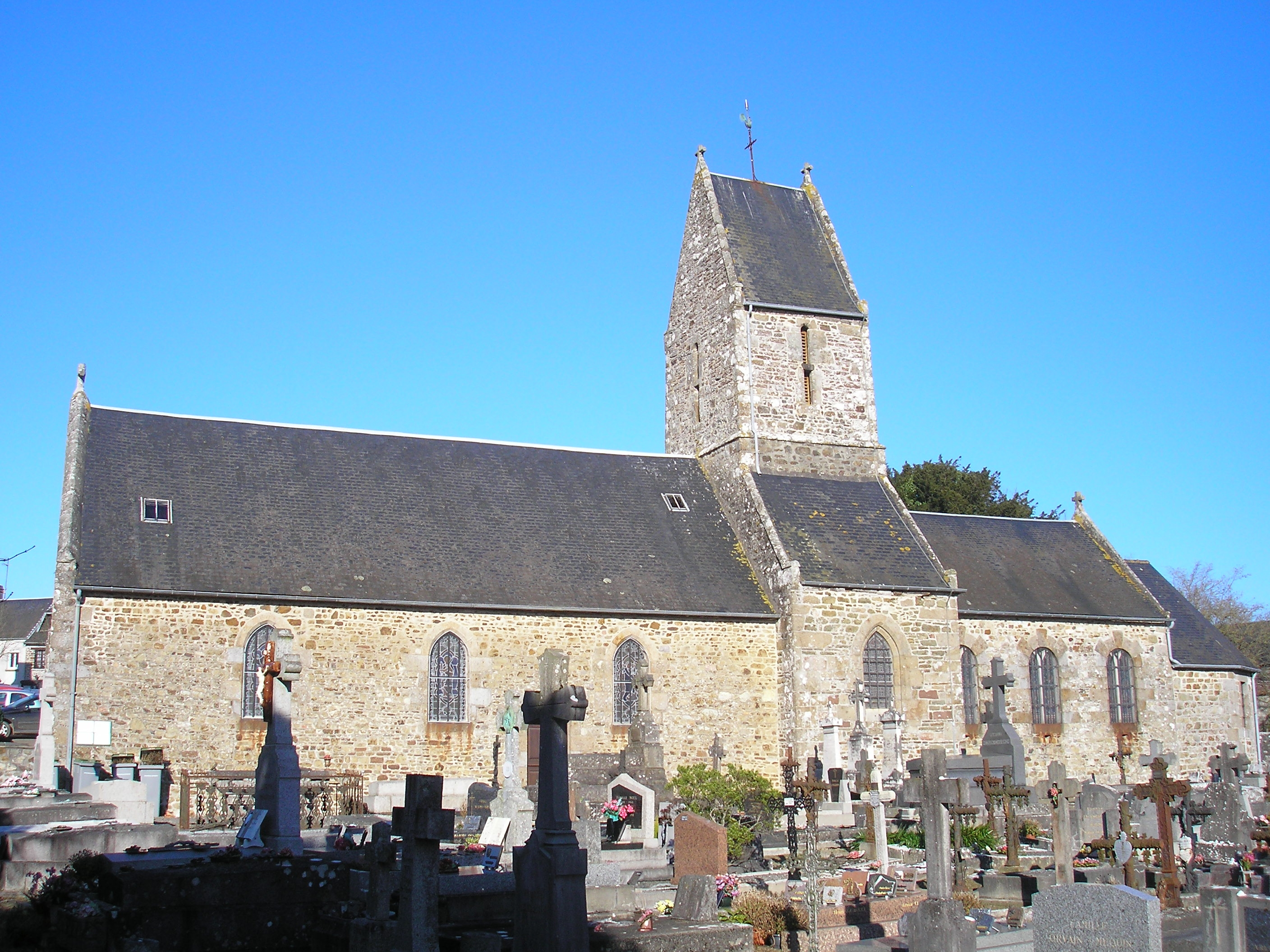
- The church of Saint-Pierre
- Location of Longueville
- Location within France Location within Normandy
- Coordinates: 48°51′15″N 1°33′02″W
- Country: France
- Region: Normandy
- Department: Manche
- Arrondissement: Avranches
- Canton: Bréhal
- Intercommunality: Granville, Terre et Mer

Government
  - Mayor (2020–2026): Jack Lelegard
- Area^{1}: 4.07 km^{2} (1.57 sq mi)
- Elevation: 25 m (82 ft)
- Highest elevation: 68 m (223 ft)
- Lowest elevation: 20 m (66 ft)
- Population (2023): 638
  - Density: 157/km^{2} (406/sq mi)
- Time zone: UTC+01:00 (CET)
  - Summer (DST): UTC+02:00 (CEST)
- INSEE/Postal code: 50277 /50290
- ^{1} French Land Register data, which excludes lakes, ponds, glaciers > 1 km^{2} (0.386 sq mi or 247 acres) and river estuaries.

Longueville (French pronunciation: [lɔ̃ɡvil]) is a commune in the Manche department of Normandy, located in north-western France.

== See also ==
- Communes of the Manche department
