= Saint-Planchers =

- Commune
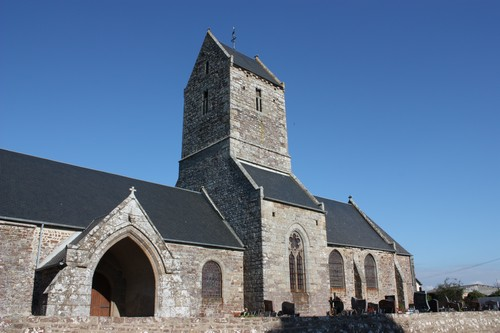
- The parish church of Saint-Pancrace
- Location of Saint-Planchers
- Location within France Location within Normandy
- Coordinates: 48°49′25″N 1°31′29″W
- Country: France
- Region: Normandy
- Department: Manche
- Arrondissement: Avranches
- Canton: Bréhal

Government
  - Mayor (2020–2026): Alain Quesnel
- Area^{1}: 11.96 km^{2} (4.62 sq mi)
- Elevation: 52 m (171 ft)
- Highest elevation: 98 m (322 ft)
- Lowest elevation: 17 m (56 ft)
- Population (2023): 1,486
  - Density: 124.2/km^{2} (321.8/sq mi)
- Time zone: UTC+01:00 (CET)
  - Summer (DST): UTC+02:00 (CEST)
- INSEE/Postal code: 50541 /50400
- ^{1} French Land Register data, which excludes lakes, ponds, glaciers > 1 km^{2} (0.386 sq mi or 247 acres) and river estuaries.

Saint-Planchers (French pronunciation: [sɛ̃ plɑ̃ʃe]) is a commune in the Manche department in Normandy in north-western France. It is the location of the Prieuré de l'Oiselière, a 12th-century priory that is classified as a Monument historique since 1989.

== See also ==
- Communes of the Manche department
