= Saint-Sauveur-la-Pommeraye =

- Commune
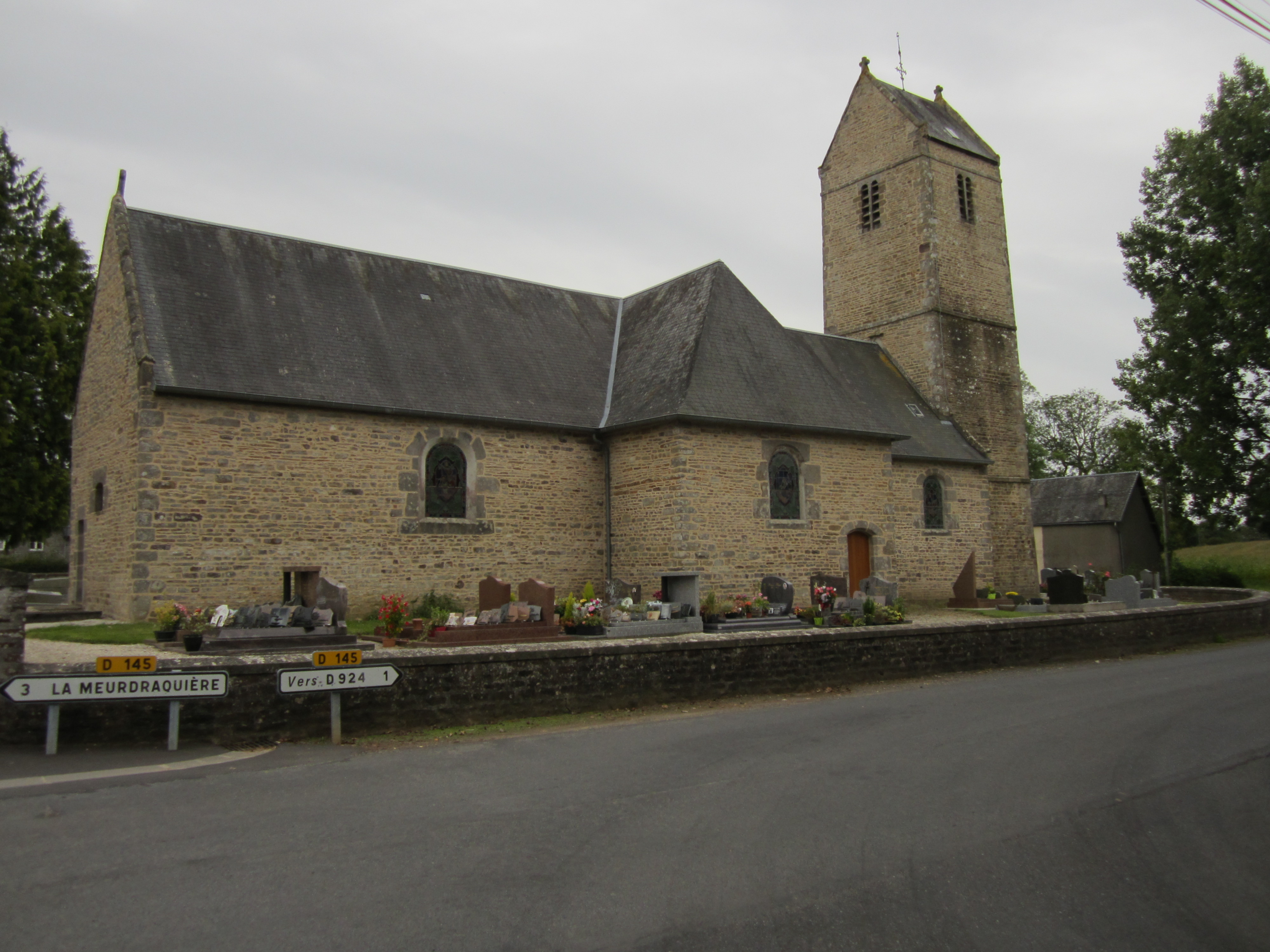
- The church of Saint-Sauveur
- Location of Saint-Sauveur-la-Pommeraye
- Location within France Location within Normandy
- Coordinates: 48°50′49″N 1°26′38″W
- Country: France
- Region: Normandy
- Department: Manche
- Arrondissement: Avranches
- Canton: Bréhal

Government
  - Mayor (2020–2026): Violaine Lion
- Area^{1}: 5.27 km^{2} (2.03 sq mi)
- Elevation: 117 m (384 ft)
- Highest elevation: 131 m (430 ft)
- Lowest elevation: 64 m (210 ft)
- Population (2023): 397
  - Density: 75.3/km^{2} (195/sq mi)
- Time zone: UTC+01:00 (CET)
  - Summer (DST): UTC+02:00 (CEST)
- INSEE/Postal code: 50549 /50510
- ^{1} French Land Register data, which excludes lakes, ponds, glaciers > 1 km^{2} (0.386 sq mi or 247 acres) and river estuaries.

Saint-Sauveur-la-Pommeraye (French pronunciation: [sɛ̃ sovœʁ la pɔmʁɛ]) is a commune in the Manche department in Normandy in north-western France.

== See also ==
- Communes of the Manche department
