= Le Loreur =

- Commune
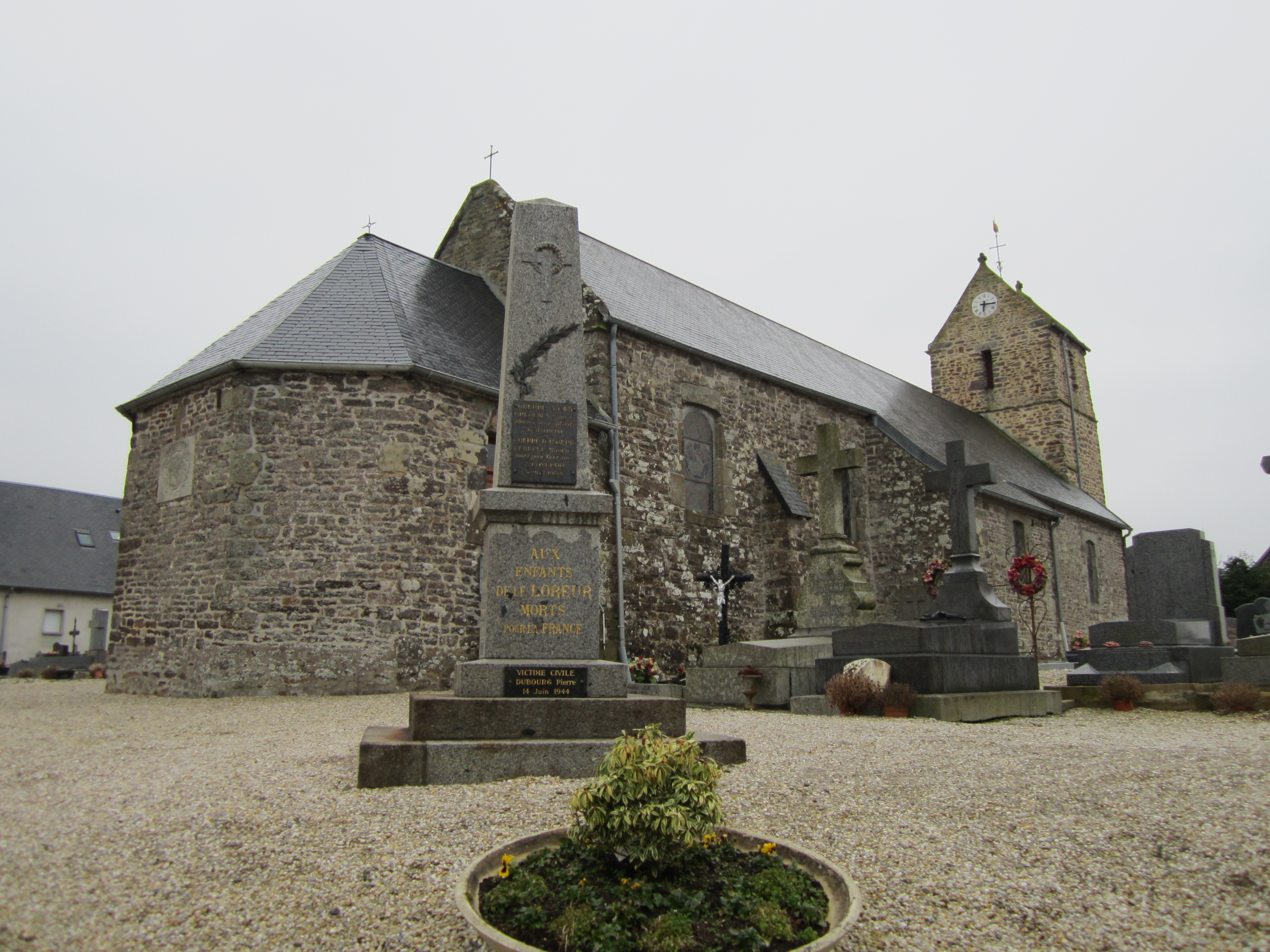
- The church of Notre-Dame
- Location of Le Loreur
- Location within France Location within Normandy
- Coordinates: 48°52′N 1°26′W
- Country: France
- Region: Normandy
- Department: Manche
- Arrondissement: Avranches
- Canton: Bréhal
- Intercommunality: Granville, Terre et Mer

Government
  - Mayor (2020–2026): Patricia Lecomte
- Area^{1}: 3.23 km^{2} (1.25 sq mi)
- Elevation: 94 m (308 ft)
- Highest elevation: 121 m (397 ft)
- Lowest elevation: 54 m (177 ft)
- Population (2023): 258
  - Density: 79.9/km^{2} (207/sq mi)
- Time zone: UTC+01:00 (CET)
  - Summer (DST): UTC+02:00 (CEST)
- INSEE/Postal code: 50278 /50510
- ^{1} French Land Register data, which excludes lakes, ponds, glaciers > 1 km^{2} (0.386 sq mi or 247 acres) and river estuaries.

Le Loreur (French pronunciation: [lə lɔʁœʁ]) is a commune in the Manche department in Normandy in north-western France.

== See also ==
- Communes of the Manche department
