= Cérences =

- Commune
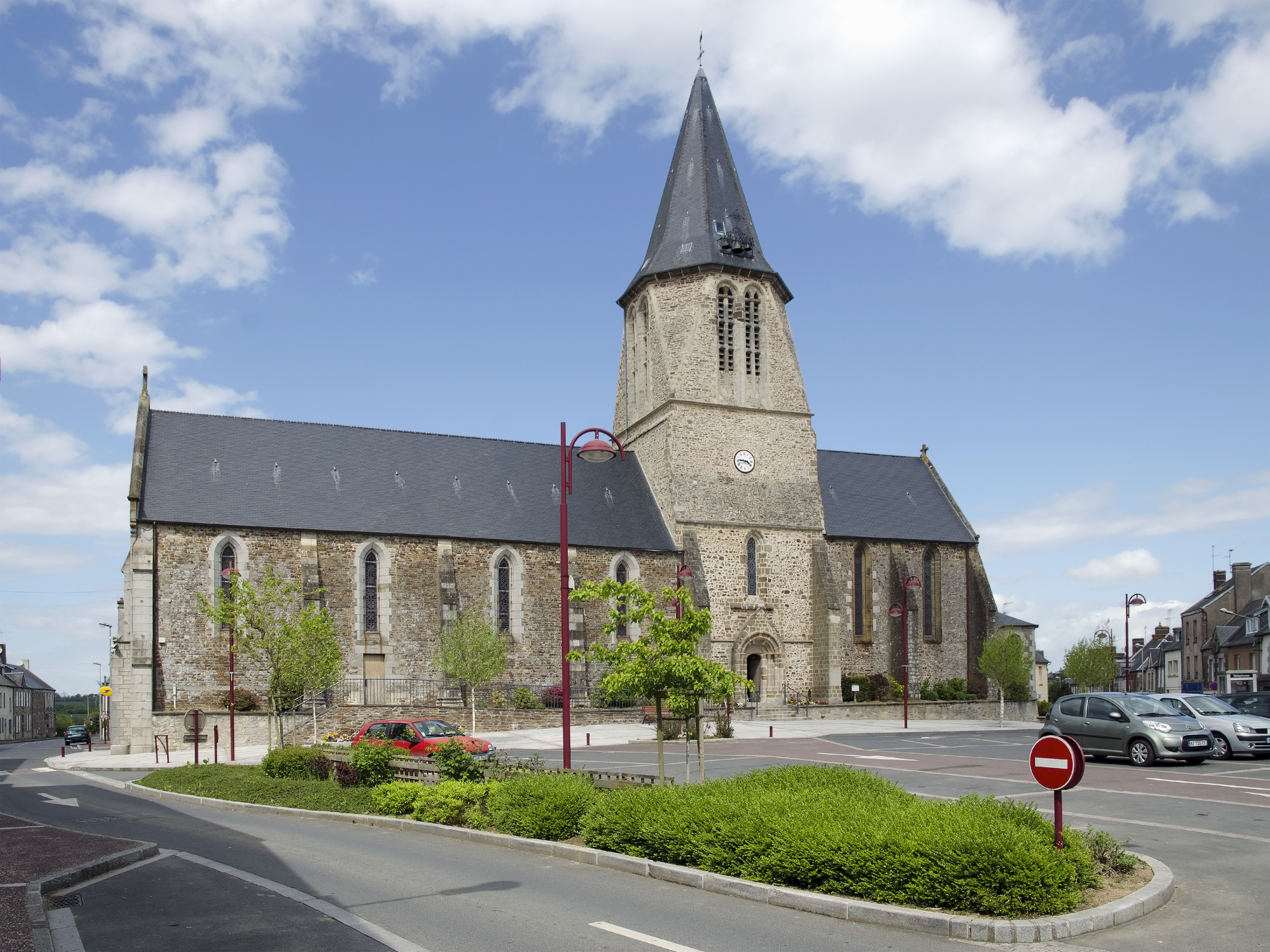
- The church of Notre-Dame in the marketplace
- Location of Cérences
- Location within France Location within Normandy
- Coordinates: 48°55′01″N 1°26′03″W
- Country: France
- Region: Normandy
- Department: Manche
- Arrondissement: Avranches
- Canton: Bréhal
- Intercommunality: Granville, Terre et Mer

Government
  - Mayor (2020–2026): Jean-Paul Payen
- Area^{1}: 26.04 km^{2} (10.05 sq mi)
- Elevation: 26 m (85 ft)
- Highest elevation: 115 m (377 ft)
- Lowest elevation: 14 m (46 ft)
- Population (2023): 1,852
  - Density: 71.12/km^{2} (184.2/sq mi)
- Time zone: UTC+01:00 (CET)
  - Summer (DST): UTC+02:00 (CEST)
- INSEE/Postal code: 50109 /50510
- ^{1} French Land Register data, which excludes lakes, ponds, glaciers > 1 km^{2} (0.386 sq mi or 247 acres) and river estuaries.

Cérences (French pronunciation: [seʁɑ̃s]) is a commune in the Manche department in Normandy in north-western France.

== International relations ==
Cérences is twinned with Bere Regis, United Kingdom.

== See also ==
- Communes of the Manche department
