= La Meurdraquière =

- Commune
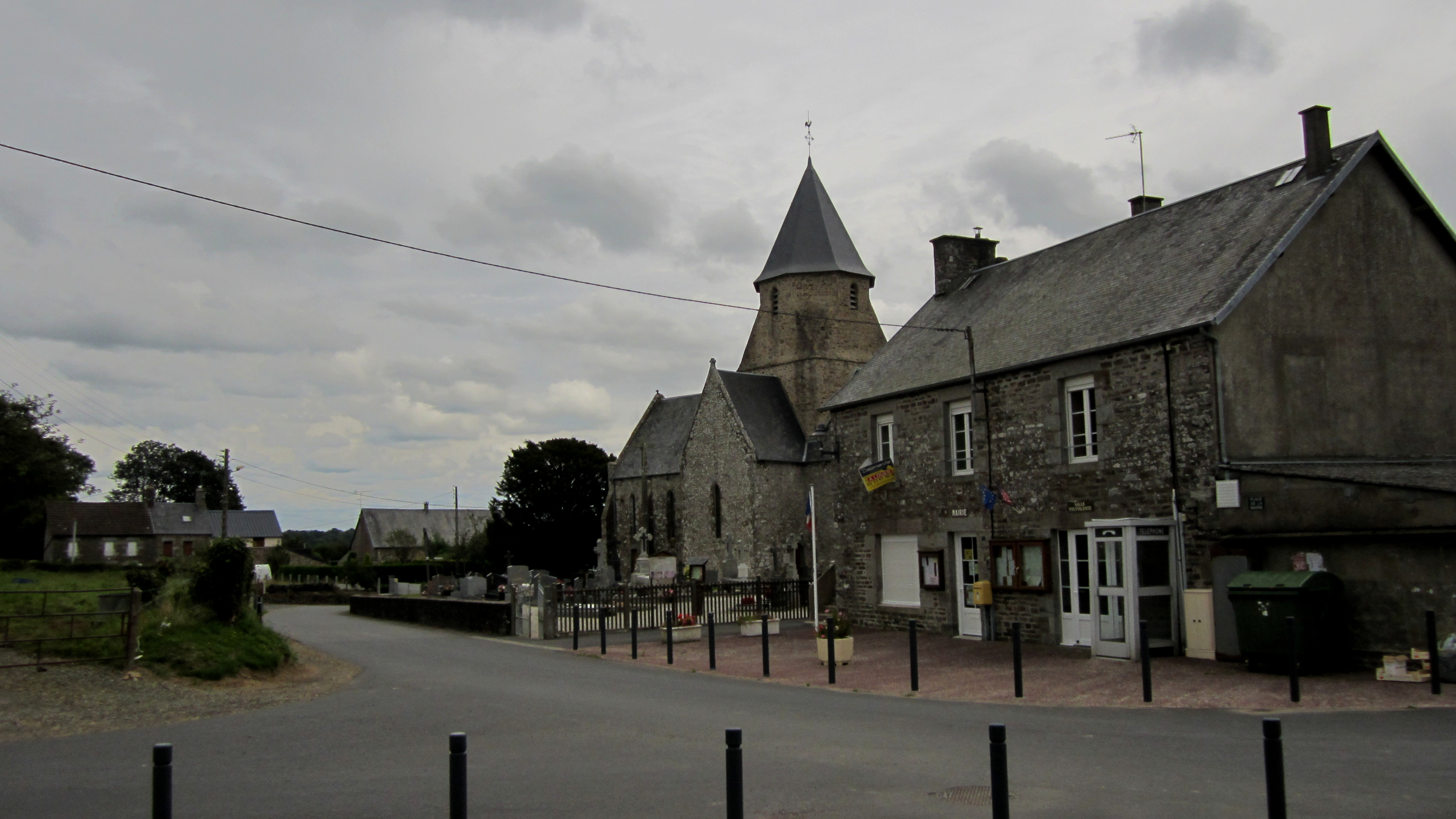
- The centre of La Meurdraquière
- Location of La Meurdraquière
- Location within France Location within Normandy
- Coordinates: 48°51′00″N 1°24′27″W
- Country: France
- Region: Normandy
- Department: Manche
- Arrondissement: Avranches
- Canton: Bréhal
- Intercommunality: Granville, Terre et Mer

Government
  - Mayor (2020–2026): Delphine Brigitte Fontaine
- Area^{1}: 7.6 km^{2} (2.9 sq mi)
- Elevation: 116 m (381 ft)
- Highest elevation: 126 m (413 ft)
- Lowest elevation: 32 m (105 ft)
- Population (2023): 195
  - Density: 26/km^{2} (66/sq mi)
- Time zone: UTC+01:00 (CET)
  - Summer (DST): UTC+02:00 (CEST)
- INSEE/Postal code: 50327 /50510
- ^{1} French Land Register data, which excludes lakes, ponds, glaciers > 1 km^{2} (0.386 sq mi or 247 acres) and river estuaries.

La Meurdraquière (French pronunciation: [la mœʁdʁakjɛʁ]) is a commune in the Manche department in Normandy in northwestern France.

== See also ==
- Communes of the Manche department
