= Golf de Granville Baie du Mont St Michel =

Golf course in France

- Interactive map of Golf de Granville Baie du Mont St Michel
- 48°52′13″N 1°34′8″W

Club information
- Location: Bréville-sur-Mer (Manche)
- Established: 1912
- Tota holes: 27
- Website: http://www.golfdegranville.com

Links - 18 holes
- Designed by: Harry Colt
- Par: 71
- Length: 6380 yds
- Course record: 66 (Chaperon A, Kosmin B & Ruiz A)

Bord de Mer - 9 holes
- Designed by: Club members
- Par: 33
- Length: 2428 yds

The Golf de Granville Baie du Mont St Michel is a 27-hole golf course located at Bréville-sur-Mer (Manche), approximately 4 miles north of Granville, Normandy, France.

The course was first laid out in 1912 and then totally redisgned by Harry Colt in 1921. This is the only true links course in France. In addition to the main 18-hole course, there is a nine-hole, par-33 links course established in 1986 which is notable for its testing greens.

== History ==
In 1910, a local hotel company began negotiations to rent land in the Bréville dunes from the Granville town council. The first 9 holes were begun by a group of local enthusiasts in 1912 with a view to a further 9 holes to be added later. The Cercle des Sports took charge of the new course, which was not officially inaugurated until July 5, 1914, although it had been in play for two years by then. The First World War soon put a stop to play, and a part of the course was requisitioned by the local garrison. After the war Granville grew in popularity as a resort, and so the course needed to be upgraded. Thus in 1921 plans were laid and work was begun under the supervision of Harry Colt, the famed English golf architect. Colt made good use of the magnificent dune landscape to design one of the largest courses in Europe at that time. A visit in 1922 by the renowned specialist in golf course design, Martin Sutton, confirmed the natural quality of the linksland. He was so impressed by what he saw on his visit across the channel that he wrote: 'the site is a golfing paradise ... I doubt if there's a course even in England or Scotland that has a more favourable natural situation.' The Granville links is a magnificent example of Harry Colt's work as a golf course designer. During World War Two the club house was requisitioned and the course closed by the occupying army. In 1957, a small group of golfers restored the course to its original layout. The course is much changed since then, with only a dozen of the original holes remaining. However, the newer holes do largely follow the original layout. Despite these changes, the course still challenges players of all standards and especially in the wind – just as on the links of Scotland or Ireland.

The designer, Christian Dior, was born in Granville and played golf at the Golf de Granville. When he came back from doing his military service in 1928, he organised a small competition for a few of his friends. This idea was taken up by the club in 1973 and since then a competition has been held in his honour each year - La Coupe Dior, of which a photo can be seen below in the gallery.

In 2008, the course was once again the venue for a national championship, the Mid Amateur (+35 years of age). The first photo in the gallery shows the 17th green during this championship which was held at Granville in September 2008.

== Photo album ==
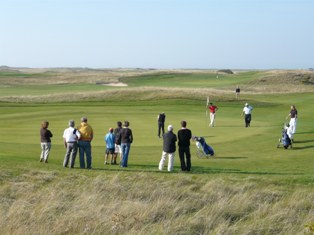
the 17th during play in the French +35 Championship September 2008

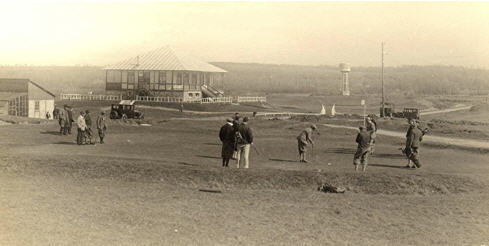
the 9th, the clubhouse and the water tower(1930s)

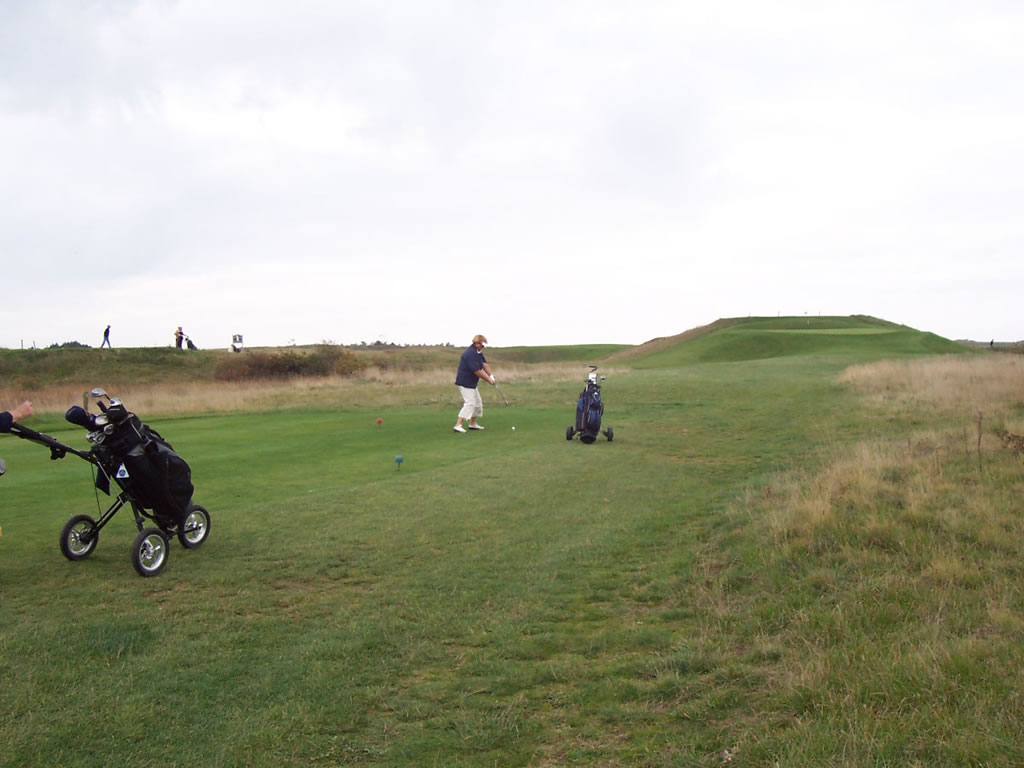
the 16th, a short par 3 but very testing in the wind

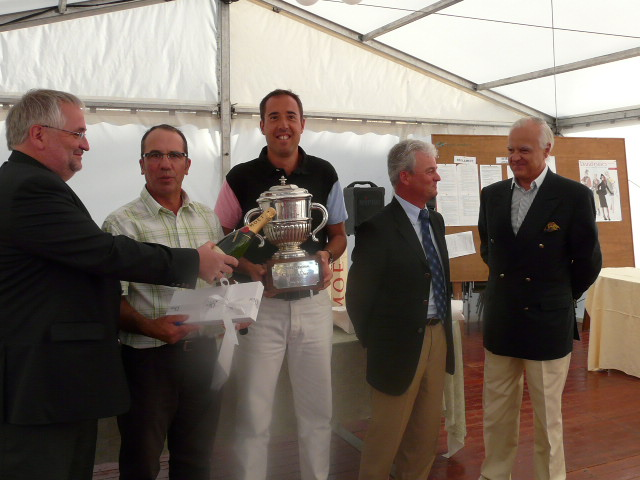
the Dior Cup being presented to Ludovic Chartier in July 2008

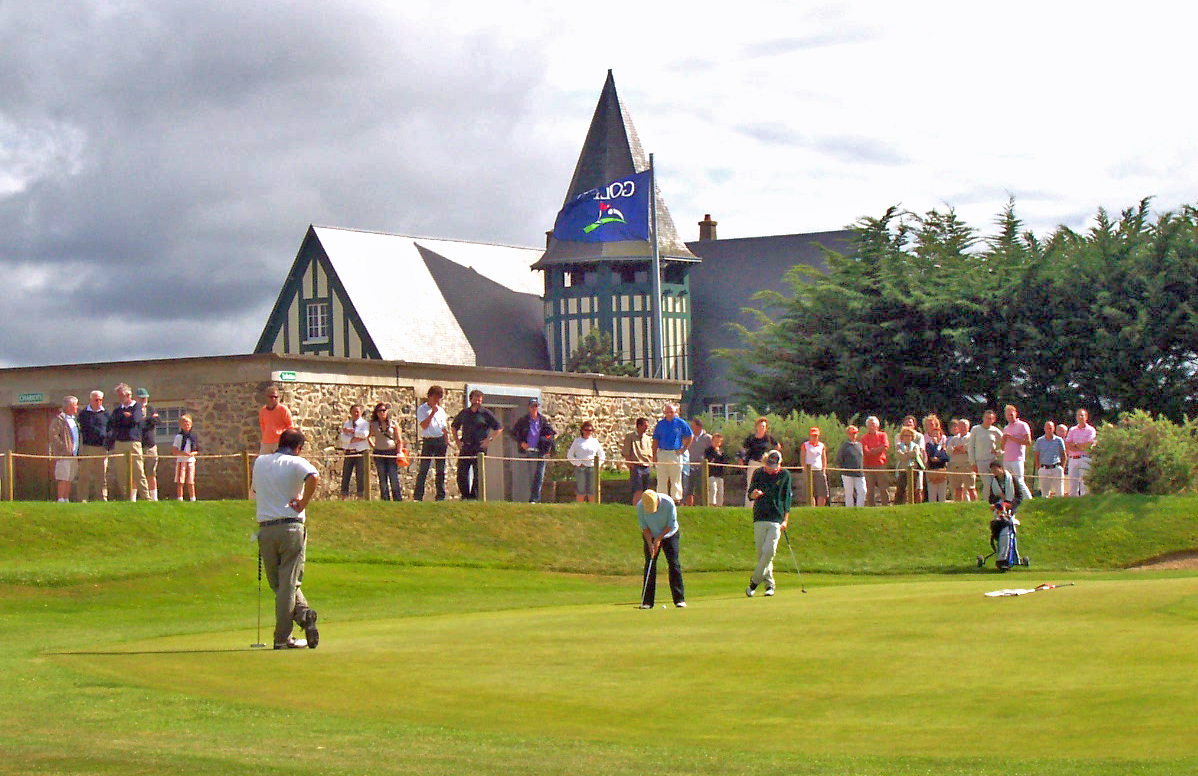
the Grand Prix de Granville 2007 - 9th green and clubhouse beyond

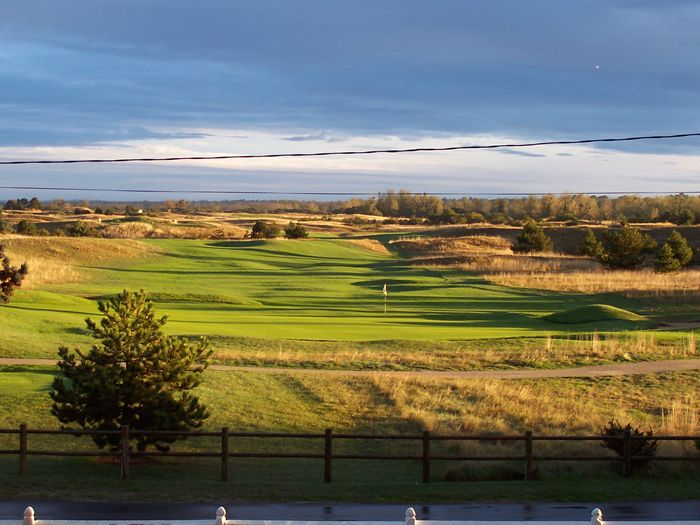
the 18th at Granville seen from the cluhouse at sunrise when the shadows play on the humps and hollows

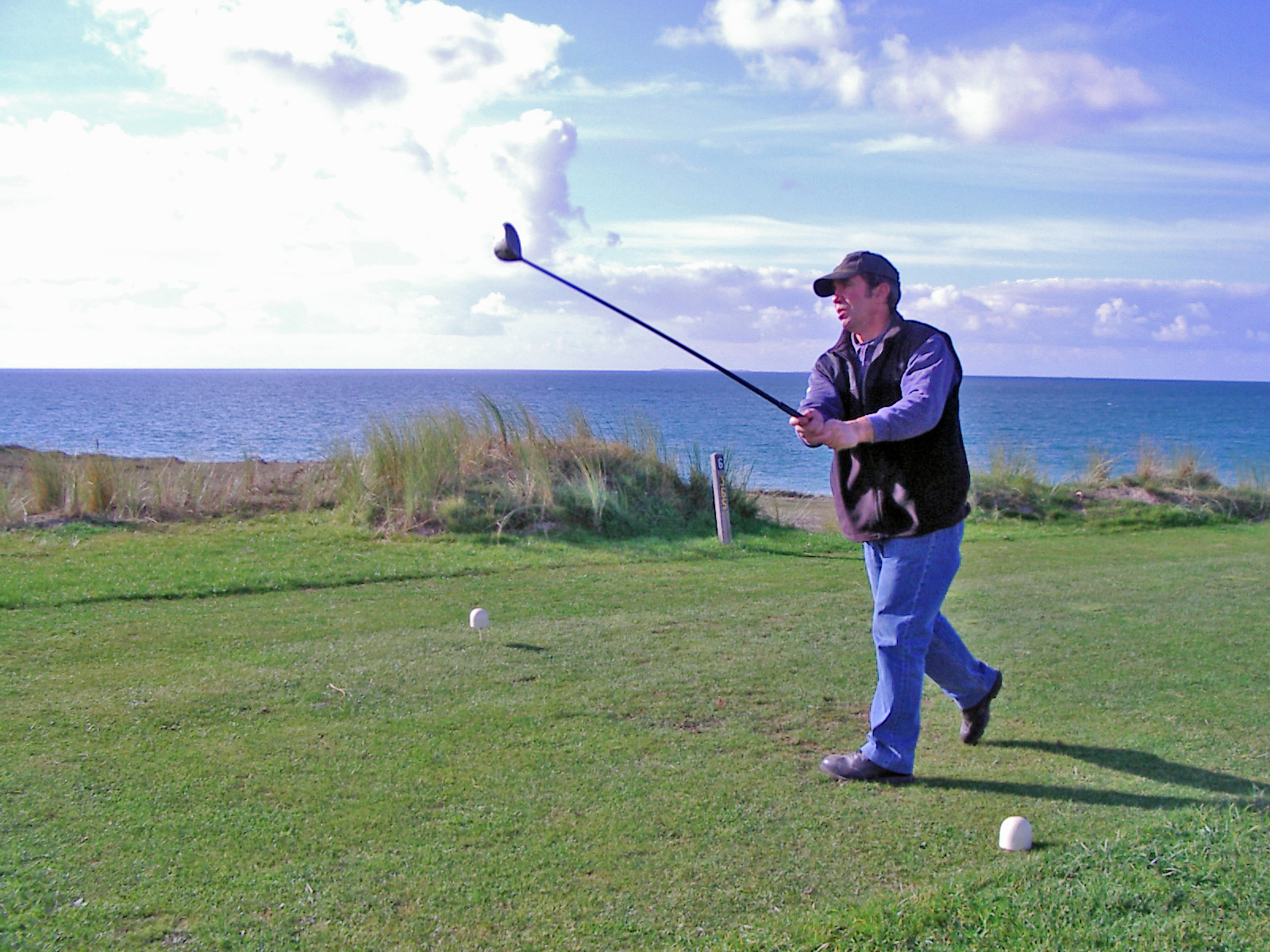
the 6th tee at Granville from where you can see Jersey and much of the Brittany coastline

== Links Course Scorecard (white tees) ==
Hole No.	Metres	Par	Hole No.	Metres	Par
1	443	5	10	158	3
2	159	3	11	499	5
3	305	4	12	183	3
4	354	4	13	403	4
5	368	4	14	503	5
6	348	4	15	387	4
7	317	4	16	126	3
8	344	4	17	357	4
9	484	5	18	316	4
Front 9	3122	37	Back 9	2932	35
Total	6054	72			

== Bord de Mer Course Scorecard ==
Hole No.	Metres	Yards	Par
1	295	323	4
2	132	144	3
3	273	299	4
4	273	299	4
5	158	173	3
6	317	347	4
7	316	346	4
8	109	119	3
9	347	379	4
Total	2220	2428	33
