= Folligny =

- Commune
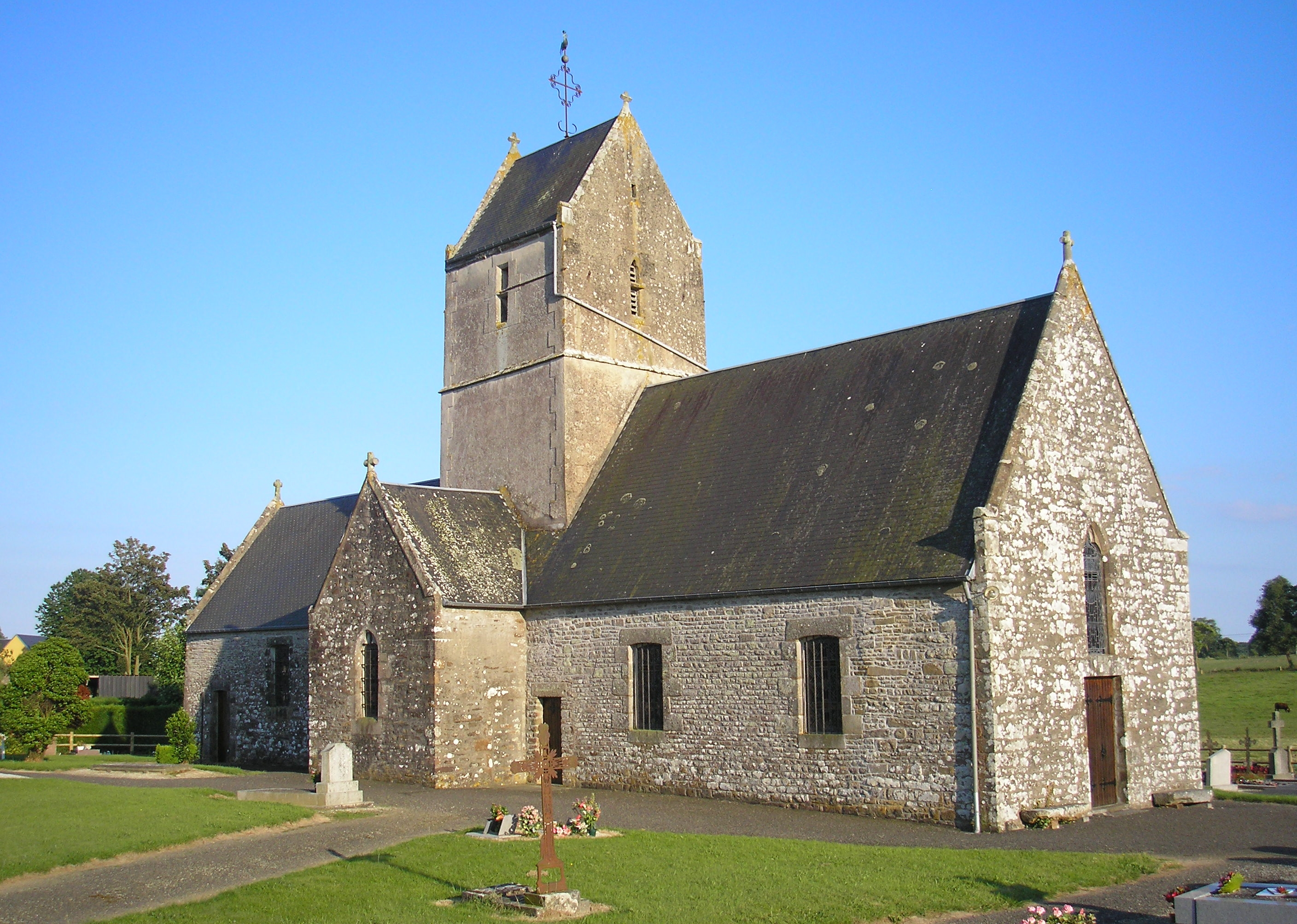
- The church of Notre-Dame-de-l'Annonciation
- Location of Folligny
- Location within France Location within Normandy
- Coordinates: 48°49′29″N 1°24′36″W
- Country: France
- Region: Normandy
- Department: Manche
- Arrondissement: Avranches
- Canton: Bréhal
- Intercommunality: Granville, Terre et Mer

Government
  - Mayor (2020–2026): Florence Goujat
- Area^{1}: 11.80 km^{2} (4.56 sq mi)
- Elevation: 126 m (413 ft)
- Highest elevation: 128 m (420 ft)
- Lowest elevation: 59 m (194 ft)
- Population (2023): 1,119
  - Density: 94.83/km^{2} (245.6/sq mi)
- Demonym: Follignais
- Time zone: UTC+01:00 (CET)
  - Summer (DST): UTC+02:00 (CEST)
- INSEE/Postal code: 50188 /50320
- ^{1} French Land Register data, which excludes lakes, ponds, glaciers > 1 km^{2} (0.386 sq mi or 247 acres) and river estuaries.

Folligny (French pronunciation: [fɔliɲi]) is a commune in the Manche department in north-western France. Folligny station has rail connections to Granville, Argentan, Caen, Paris and Rennes.

== See also ==
- Communes of the Manche department
