= Bricqueville-sur-Mer =

- Commune
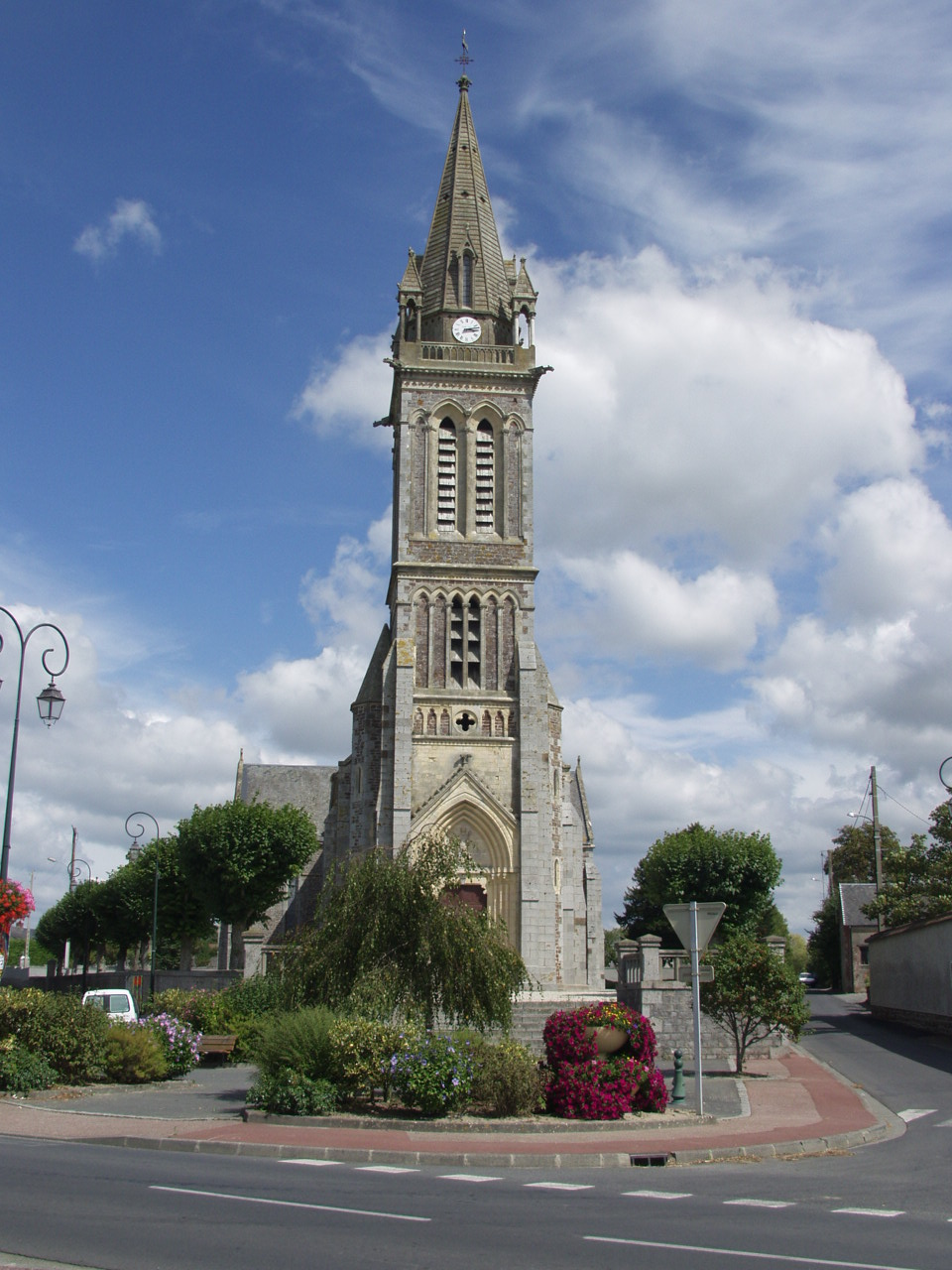
- The church of Saint-Vigor

- Coat of arms
- Location of Bricqueville-sur-Mer
- Location within France Location within Normandy
- Coordinates: 48°54′51″N 1°31′15″W
- Country: France
- Region: Normandy
- Department: Manche
- Arrondissement: Avranches
- Canton: Bréhal

Government
  - Mayor (2020–2026): Hervé Bougon
- Area^{1}: 12.88 km^{2} (4.97 sq mi)
- Elevation: 60 m (200 ft)
- Highest elevation: 73 m (240 ft)
- Lowest elevation: 3 m (9.8 ft)
- Population (2023): 1,261
  - Density: 97.90/km^{2} (253.6/sq mi)
- Time zone: UTC+01:00 (CET)
  - Summer (DST): UTC+02:00 (CEST)
- INSEE/Postal code: 50085 /50290
- ^{1} French Land Register data, which excludes lakes, ponds, glaciers > 1 km^{2} (0.386 sq mi or 247 acres) and river estuaries.

Bricqueville-sur-Mer (French pronunciation: [bʁikvil syʁ mɛʁ], literally Bricqueville on Sea) is a commune in the Manche department in Normandy in northwestern France.

== Population ==
Historical population
Year	Pop.	±% p.a.
1968	774	—
1975	778	+0.07%
1982	797	+0.35%
1990	810	+0.20%
1999	908	+1.28%
2007	1,085	+2.25%
2012	1,173	+1.57%
2017	1,212	+0.66%
2023	1,261	+0.66%
Source: INSEE

== See also ==
- Communes of the Manche department
