= Prieuré de l'Oiselière =

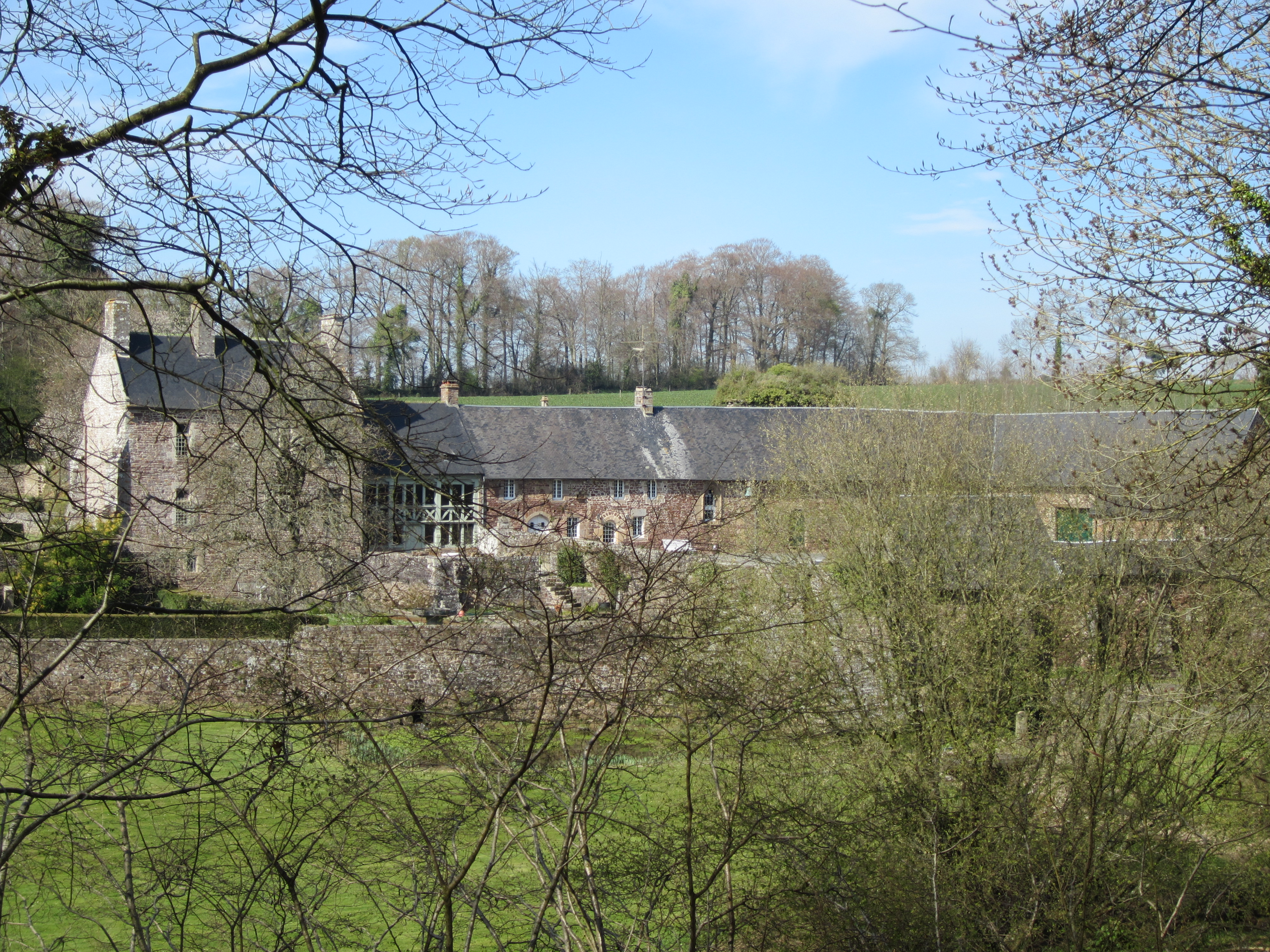
- Prieuré de l'Oiselière
- Interactive map of the Prieuré de l'Oiselière area

General information
- Type: Manor house
- Location: Normandy, Manche, Saint Planchers, France
- Coordinates: 48.8221°N 1.4962°W
- Construction started: 12th century

The Prieuré de l'Oiselière is a priory located at Saint-Planchers, near Granville, in France. Nestled in a valley bordering the watercourse that bears its name, surrounded by fortified walls and moats, its history dates back to the 12th century. It was a dependency of the abbots of Mont-Saint-Michel who organised the cultivation of the fields and the woods and collected taxes. It was also a local justice court.

Restoration of the priory began in 1989, when it was classified as a Monument historique by the French Ministry of Culture.

== History ==
=== Founding ===
In 1022, Richard II (Duke of Normandy) gave the Priory of Saint-Pair and its outbuildings to Mont-Saint-Michel Abbey. The area was bound to the east by the public road of Coutances, to the north by the Vanlée (a coastal river), to the south by the small river Thar, and to the west by the sea with the island of Chausey.

Various writings on local history describe the Oiselière as being part of the dependencies of the abbey of Saint-Pair, of which no other written or archaeological trace is known. Thomas Le Roy has also claimed the 'Oiselière' is the priory of Saint-Pair that in 1321 appears by name in historical acts authorizing the construction of its chapel. He refers to the construction of a chapel in Loysellière in 1321, and the inventory of the charters of Mont-Saint-Michel from the 14th century which read: "Concessio episcopi pro capella de Loiseliere" which means: authorization of the bishop for the chapel of Oiselière.

In 1321, the chapel was added to an existing building. Studies of present-day Oiselière allow us to imagine the building that was there before the additions. Rectangular in shape, it was on the site of the present cathedral hall and farmhouse. Its western exterior buttress forms the eastern and the northern walls of the cathedral hall and is visible from inside the ground floor of the present day manor. The addition of the chapel was made to the west of this first building.

The Prael Forest, which was a dependency of Oiselière, is mentioned by name earlier than Oiselière itself. In 1294, there is a record of a donation to the monks by Thomas, esquire, Lord du Pont, of the Prael Forest, situated in the parish of Saint-Planchers. In 1297 a judgment was given between Guillaume du Bois and the monks for the Prael Forest in Saint-Planchers. It was found that Guillaume du Bois had the right to keep four cows and ten pigs in pasture and to take a cartload of wood each week (1297).

=== The Hundred Years' War ===
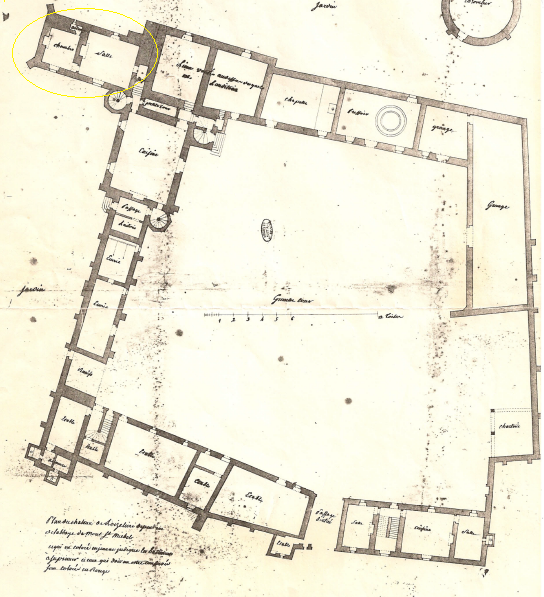
Plan de l'Oiselière, 1776.

The history of the abbots of Mont-Saint-Michel provides historical insight for the following years.

"In the year 1420, the Abbot Jolivet, troubled by so many pains and fatigues endured with the upkeep and maintenance of this place of Mont-St-Michel, [...] no longer having the heart to continue, comes out of his monastery the same year 1420, and leaves. He lets his monks act in their discretion. He will no longer come there, staying sometimes at Rouen, sometimes at L'Oiseliere, and elsewhere, where he sees fit. He does so well, being outside of this monastery, that he obtains the benevolence of the King of England, who allows him to enjoy all the possessions that this monastery has in the province of Normandy, which the aforementioned Englishman occupies for him, and our Robert behaves as he wishes without yielding any denier to his monks who carry the weight of the day and the heat, to preserve this place under the rule of the king of France. They are extremely poor, almost all the income and the most handsome revenue being in Normandy, from which Mgr Abbot Jolivet lives extravagantly and serves his friends lavish food, leaving his monks without bread."...

"The first calamity to befall the Oiselière dates to the year 1442 when, since it had been confiscated by the King of England twenty-five years ago, the French, who came to reclaim Granville, seized the manor, pillaged it, set it afire and partially destroyed it."

=== The Renaissance ===
In 1509, the Abbot Guillaume de Lamps undertook great works at the Oiselière, in a graceful style that this era saw flourish. His brother J. de Lamps, according to the Gallia Christiana, would go on to complete this work.

The plan of the Oiselière (1766) gives an idea of these works with the addition of the manor in the west. In the style of the Renaissance, terraced gardens were established on the site of the ramparts of the first building.

=== Commendatory abbots ===
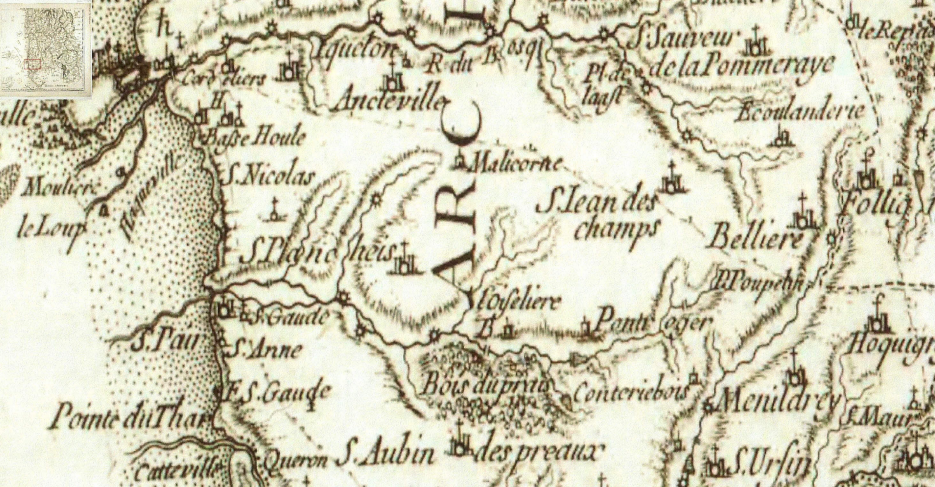
Map of 1689.

The Oiselière served as a refuge for Arthur de Cossé (the illegitimate son recognized by Charles I, Count of Brissac) who in 1562 became bishop of Coutances, during one of the French wars of religion, then abbot of Mont-Saint-Michel in 1570. He died there in 1587.

The commendatory abbots, more concerned about the collection of income than the maintenance of buildings, let the manor fall into ruin.

The 1698 statistics indicate that the barony of the Oiselière, whose manor was in the parish of Saint-Planchers, belonged to the abbots and priests of Mont-Saint-Michel. The term "barony" appears for the first time on this document and seems to indicate that L'Oiseliere was at that time more than a manor house and that its domain was considered big enough to justify this title.

Thomas Cambernon was the last owner to benefit from the profits of the Oiselière, before the lands were sold during the Revolution.

=== Abandonment and restoration ===
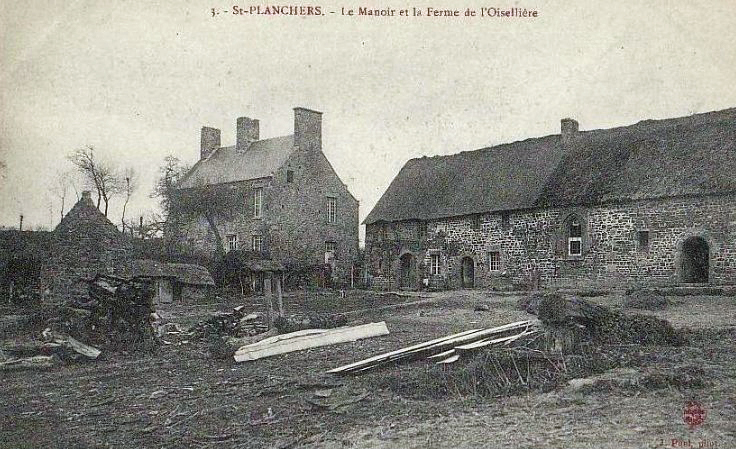
Old postcard.

Over time, the surrounding residents used the buildings as a source of construction material. In 1878, Father Lecanu noted with sadness that the chapel had been divided into several rooms and appropriated for secular purposes, a bed occupying the place of the altar.

"All the defensive apparatus of the first fortified manor has practically disappeared: the body of water, evaporated; the moats, partially filled; the enclosure, whose walls are buttressed, is entirely filled with gaps; only the double curved porch still gives access to the vast inner courtyard."

It was not until its addition to the Monument historique list by decree of November 27, 1989, that restoration began.
