= Le Grippon =

- Commune
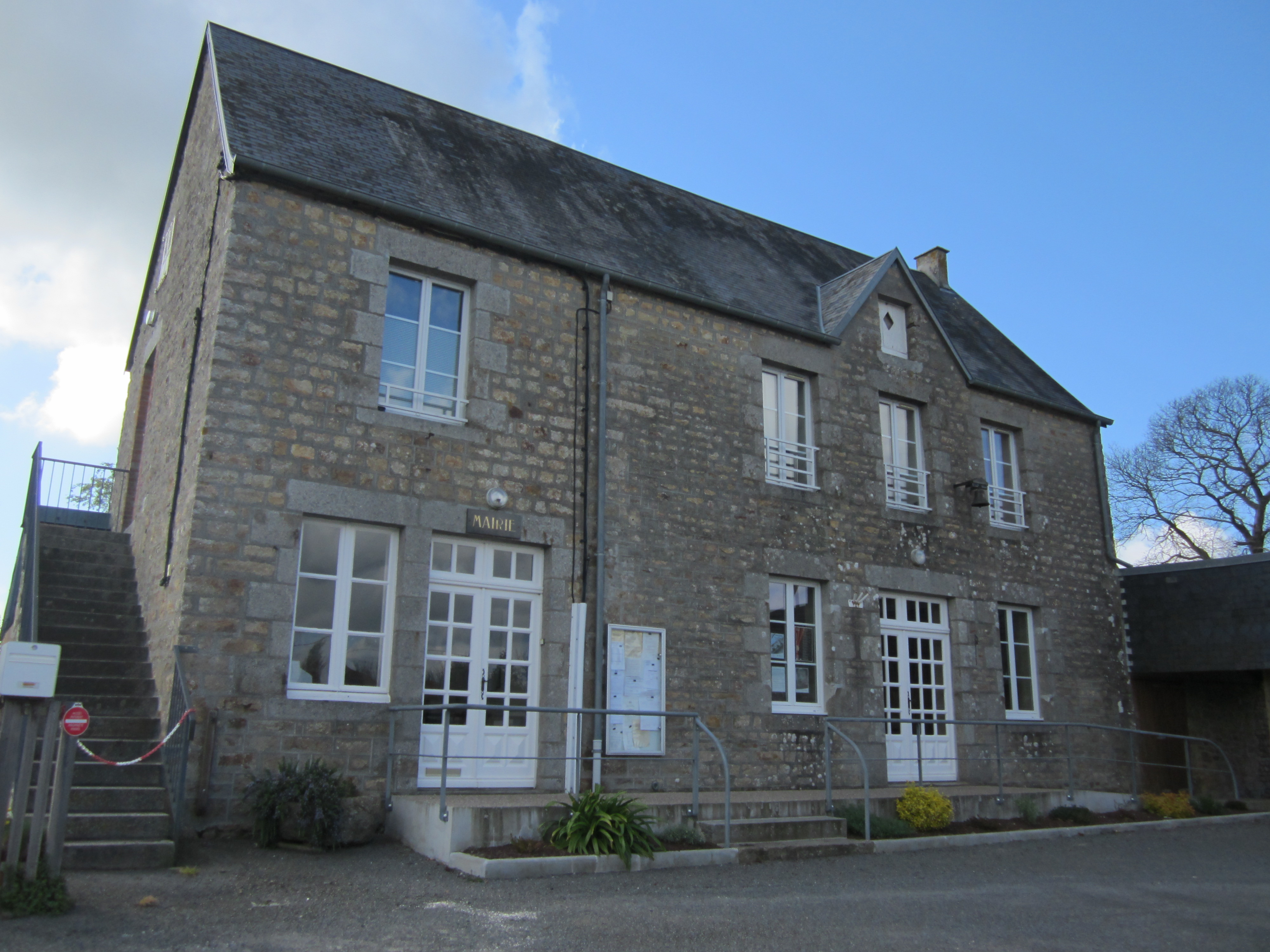
- The town hall in Champcervon
- Location of Le Grippon
- Location within France Location within Normandy
- Coordinates: 48°46′34″N 1°23′46″W
- Country: France
- Region: Normandy
- Department: Manche
- Arrondissement: Avranches
- Canton: Bréhal
- Intercommunality: CA Mont-Saint-Michel-Normandie

Government
  - Mayor (2020–2026): Rémi Pinet
- Area^{1}: 9.81 km^{2} (3.79 sq mi)
- Population (2023): 391
  - Density: 39.9/km^{2} (103/sq mi)
- Time zone: UTC+01:00 (CET)
  - Summer (DST): UTC+02:00 (CEST)
- INSEE/Postal code: 50115 /50320
- ^{1} French Land Register data, which excludes lakes, ponds, glaciers > 1 km^{2} (0.386 sq mi or 247 acres) and river estuaries.

Le Grippon (French pronunciation: [lə ɡʁipɔ̃]) is a commune in the department of Manche, northwestern France. The municipality was established on 1 January 2016 by merger of the former communes of Champcervon and Les Chambres.

== See also ==
- Communes of the Manche department
