= Le Luot =

- Commune
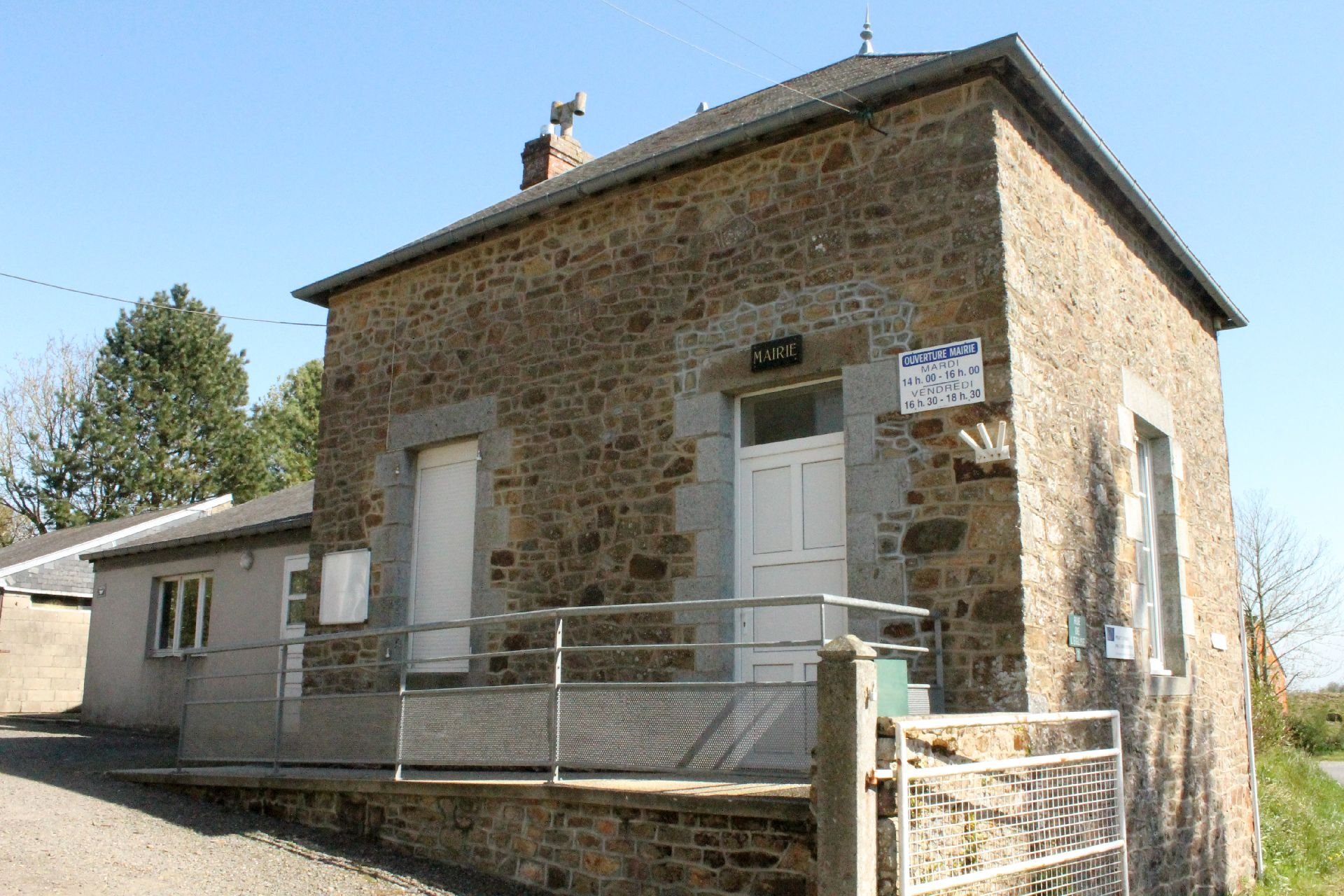
- Town hall
- Location of Le Luot
- Location within France Location within Normandy
- Coordinates: 48°45′27″N 1°19′06″W
- Country: France
- Region: Normandy
- Department: Manche
- Arrondissement: Avranches
- Canton: Bréhal
- Intercommunality: CA Mont-Saint-Michel-Normandie

Government
  - Mayor (2020–2026): Daniel Guesnon
- Area^{1}: 8.50 km^{2} (3.28 sq mi)
- Elevation: 136 m (446 ft)
- Highest elevation: 182 m (597 ft)
- Lowest elevation: 80 m (260 ft)
- Population (2023): 275
  - Density: 32.4/km^{2} (83.8/sq mi)
- Time zone: UTC+01:00 (CET)
  - Summer (DST): UTC+02:00 (CEST)
- INSEE/Postal code: 50282 /50870
- ^{1} French Land Register data, which excludes lakes, ponds, glaciers > 1 km^{2} (0.386 sq mi or 247 acres) and river estuaries.

Le Luot (French pronunciation: [lə lɥo]) is a commune in the Manche department in Normandy in north-western France.

== See also ==
- Communes of the Manche department
