= La Mouche, Manche =

La Mouche
- Commune
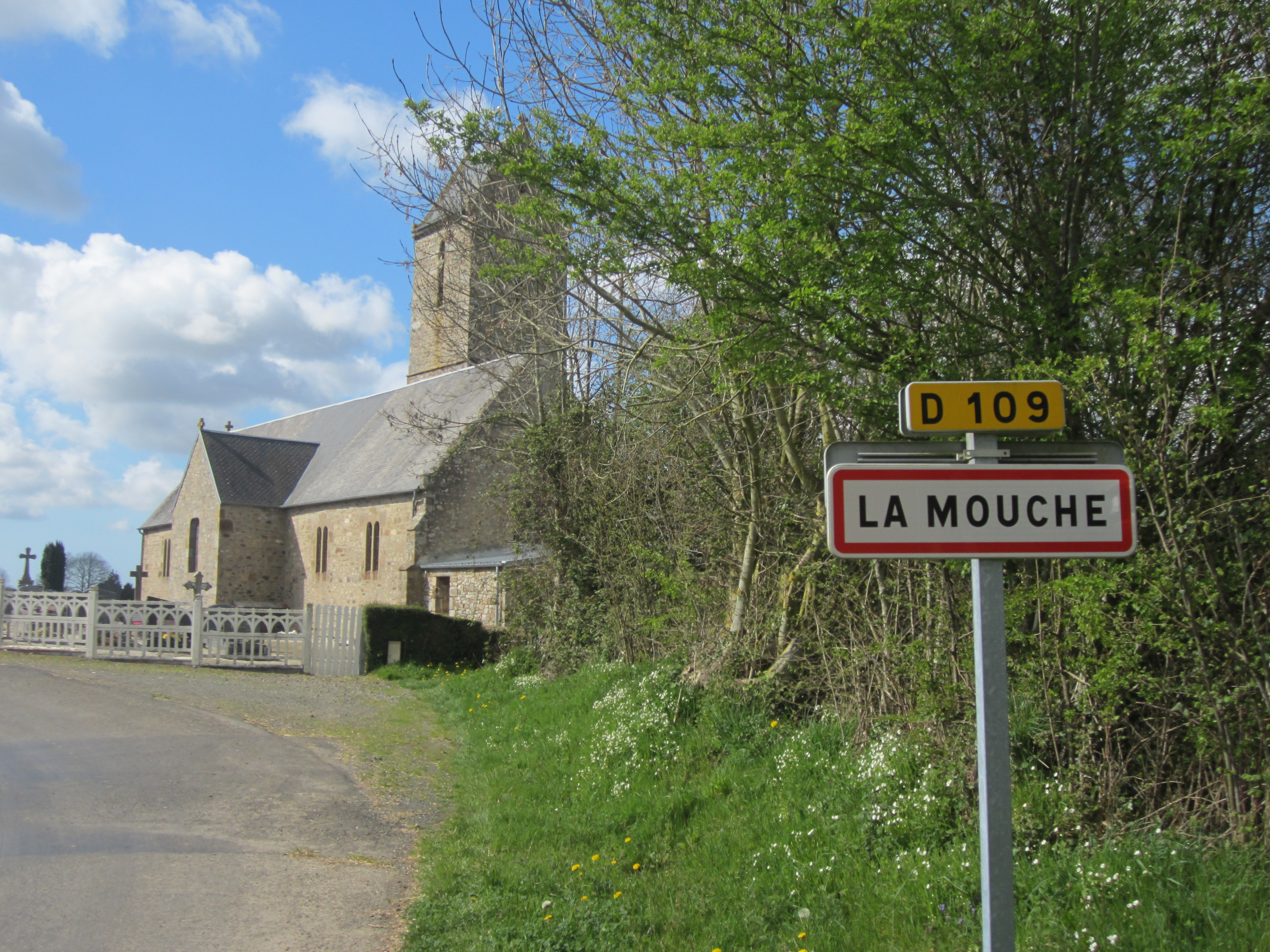
- Entrance to the village
- Location of La Mouche
- Location within France Location within Normandy
- Coordinates: 48°47′39″N 1°20′55″W
- Country: France
- Region: Normandy
- Department: Manche
- Arrondissement: Avranches
- Canton: Bréhal

Government
  - Mayor (2020–2026): Marie-Claude Corbin
- Area^{1}: 4.43 km^{2} (1.71 sq mi)
- Elevation: 130 m (430 ft)
- Highest elevation: 153 m (502 ft)
- Lowest elevation: 97 m (318 ft)
- Population (2023): 249
  - Density: 56.2/km^{2} (146/sq mi)
- Demonym: Moucherons
- Time zone: UTC+01:00 (CET)
  - Summer (DST): UTC+02:00 (CEST)
- INSEE/Postal code: 50361 /50320
- Website: www.sitego.fr/la-mouche
- ^{1} French Land Register data, which excludes lakes, ponds, glaciers > 1 km^{2} (0.386 sq mi or 247 acres) and river estuaries.

La Mouche (French pronunciation: [la muʃ]) is a commune in the Manche department in Normandy in north-western France.

== Heraldry ==
Arms of La Mouche	The arms of La Mouche are blazoned : Azure, 3 hands appaumy argent, on a chief gules, 2 episcopal croziers in saltire Or.

== See also ==
- Communes of the Manche department
