= Muneville-sur-Mer =

- Commune
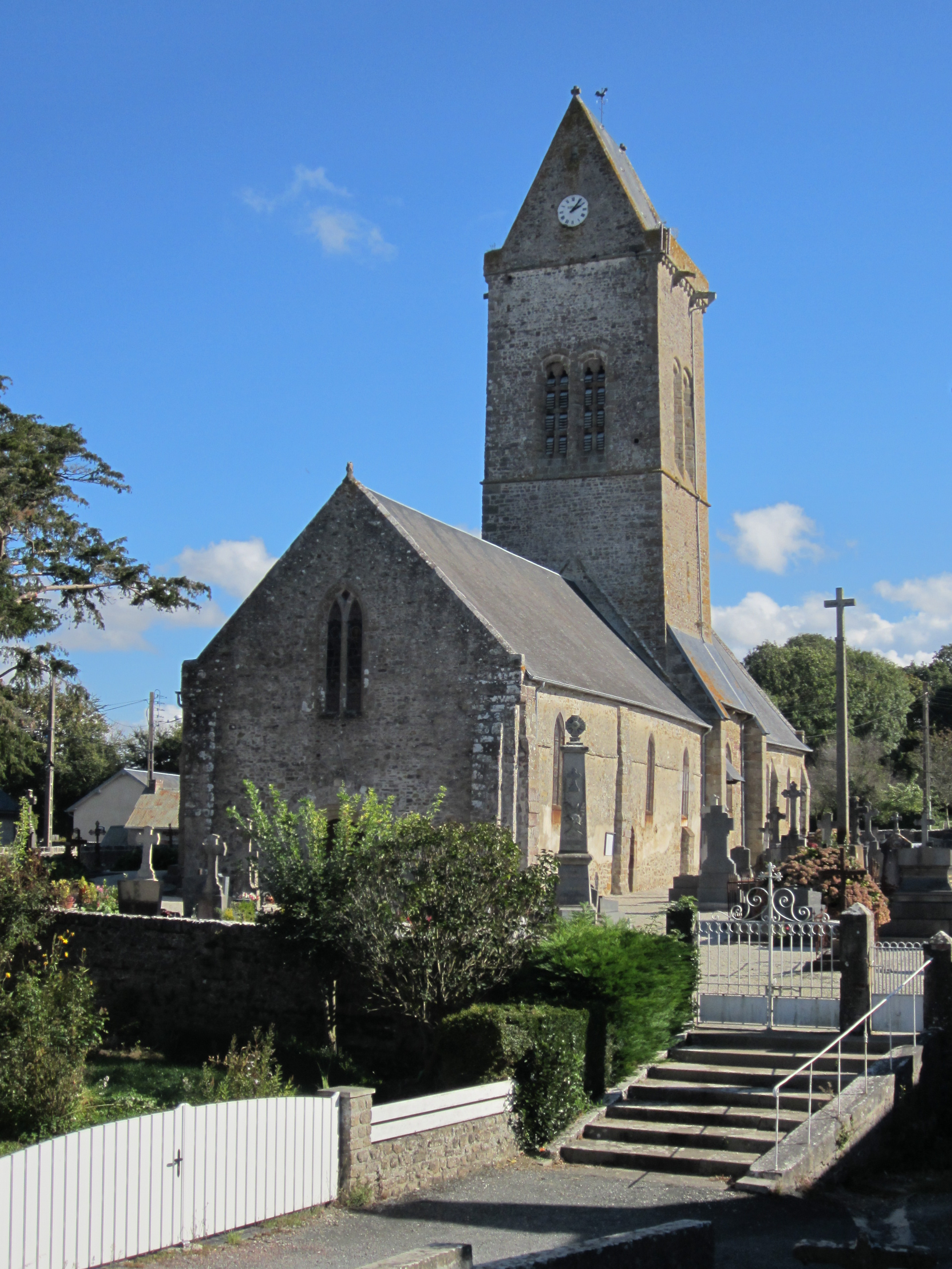
- The church of Saint-Pierre

- Coat of arms
- Location of Muneville-sur-Mer
- Location within France Location within Normandy
- Coordinates: 48°56′03″N 1°29′23″W
- Country: France
- Region: Normandy
- Department: Manche
- Arrondissement: Avranches
- Canton: Bréhal
- Intercommunality: Granville, Terre et Mer

Government
  - Mayor (2020–2026): François Harel
- Area^{1}: 7.42 km^{2} (2.86 sq mi)
- Elevation: 54 m (177 ft)
- Highest elevation: 74 m (243 ft)
- Lowest elevation: 19 m (62 ft)
- Population (2023): 491
  - Density: 66.2/km^{2} (171/sq mi)
- Demonym: Munevillais
- Time zone: UTC+01:00 (CET)
  - Summer (DST): UTC+02:00 (CEST)
- INSEE/Postal code: 50365 /50290
- ^{1} French Land Register data, which excludes lakes, ponds, glaciers > 1 km^{2} (0.386 sq mi or 247 acres) and river estuaries.

Muneville-sur-Mer (French pronunciation: [mynvil syʁ mɛʁ], literally Muneville on Sea) is a commune in the Manche department in Normandy in north-western France.

== See also ==
- Communes of the Manche department
