= Subligny, Manche =

Subligny
- Commune
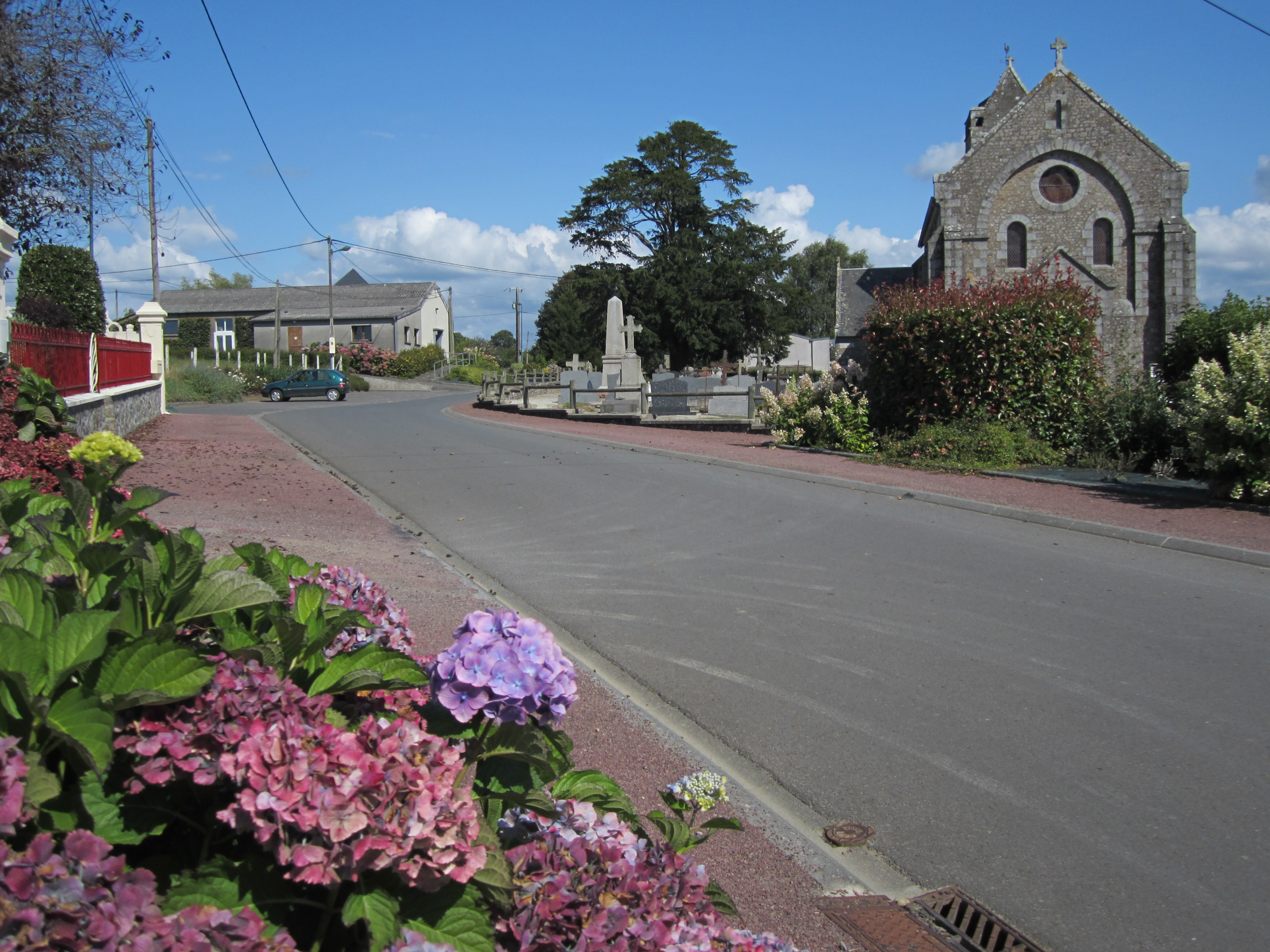
- View of the village

- Coat of arms
- Location of Subligny
- Location within France Location within Normandy
- Coordinates: 48°44′45″N 1°21′52″W
- Country: France
- Region: Normandy
- Department: Manche
- Arrondissement: Avranches
- Canton: Bréhal
- Intercommunality: CA Mont-Saint-Michel-Normandie

Government
  - Mayor (2020–2026): Henri Legeard
- Area^{1}: 8.00 km^{2} (3.09 sq mi)
- Elevation: 118 m (387 ft)
- Highest elevation: 140 m (460 ft)
- Lowest elevation: 45 m (148 ft)
- Population (2023): 375
  - Density: 46.9/km^{2} (121/sq mi)
- Time zone: UTC+01:00 (CET)
  - Summer (DST): UTC+02:00 (CEST)
- INSEE/Postal code: 50584 /50870
- ^{1} French Land Register data, which excludes lakes, ponds, glaciers > 1 km^{2} (0.386 sq mi or 247 acres) and river estuaries.

Subligny (French pronunciation: [sybliɲi]) is a commune in the Manche department in Normandy in north-western France.

== See also ==
- Communes of the Manche department
