= Canton of Bréhal =

Coordinates: 48.90°N 1.51°W

The canton of Bréhal is an administrative division of the Manche department, northwestern France. Its borders were modified at the French canton reorganisation which came into effect in March 2015. Its seat is in Bréhal.

It consists of the following communes:

1. Anctoville-sur-Boscq
2. Beauchamps
3. Bréhal
4. Bréville-sur-Mer
5. Bricqueville-sur-Mer
6. Cérences
7. Chanteloup
8. Coudeville-sur-Mer
9. Équilly
10. Folligny
11. Le Grippon
12. La Haye-Pesnel
13. Hocquigny
14. Hudimesnil
15. Longueville
16. Le Loreur
17. La Lucerne-d'Outremer
18. Le Luot
19. Le Mesnil-Aubert
20. La Meurdraquière
21. La Mouche
22. Muneville-sur-Mer
23. Saint-Aubin-des-Préaux
24. Saint-Jean-des-Champs
25. Saint-Planchers
26. Saint-Sauveur-la-Pommeraye
27. Subligny
