= Mont-Saint-Michel Bay =

UNESCO World Heritage Site
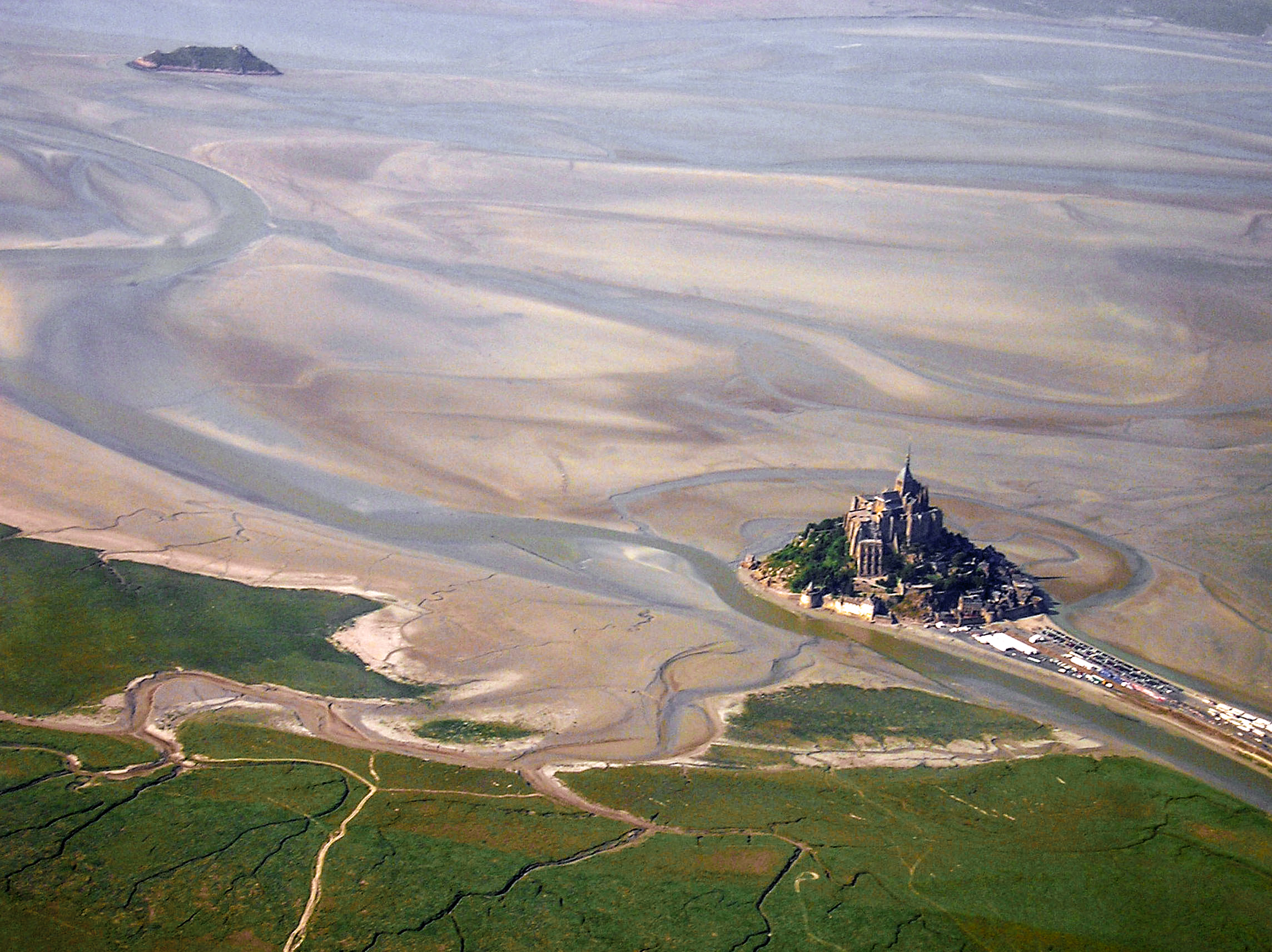

- Location within France
- Location: Brittany, Normandy, France
- Part of: Mont-Saint-Michel and its Bay
- Criteria: Cultural: (i), (iii), (vi)
- Reference: 80bis
- Inscription: 1979 (3rd Session)
- Extensions: 2007
- Coordinates: 48°38′05″N 1°30′38″W

Ramsar Wetland
- Official name: Baie du Mont-Saint-Michel
- Designated: 14 October 1994
- Reference no.: 709

The Mont-Saint-Michel Bay (French: baie du Mont-Saint-Michel, pronounced [bɛ dy mɔ̃ sɛ̃ miʃɛl]; Breton: Bae Menez-Mikael) is located between Brittany (to the south west) and the Normandy peninsula of Cotentin (to the south and east). The bay was listed as a UNESCO world heritage site in 1979 for its aesthetic quality and its importance to the Christian tradition. Due to the significant tidal movements in this region (over 10 meters) a large part of the bay is uncovered at low tide. There are two granitic islands in the bay: Tombelaine and the Mont-Saint-Michel. Many birds and harbor seals live in this area.

== General considerations ==
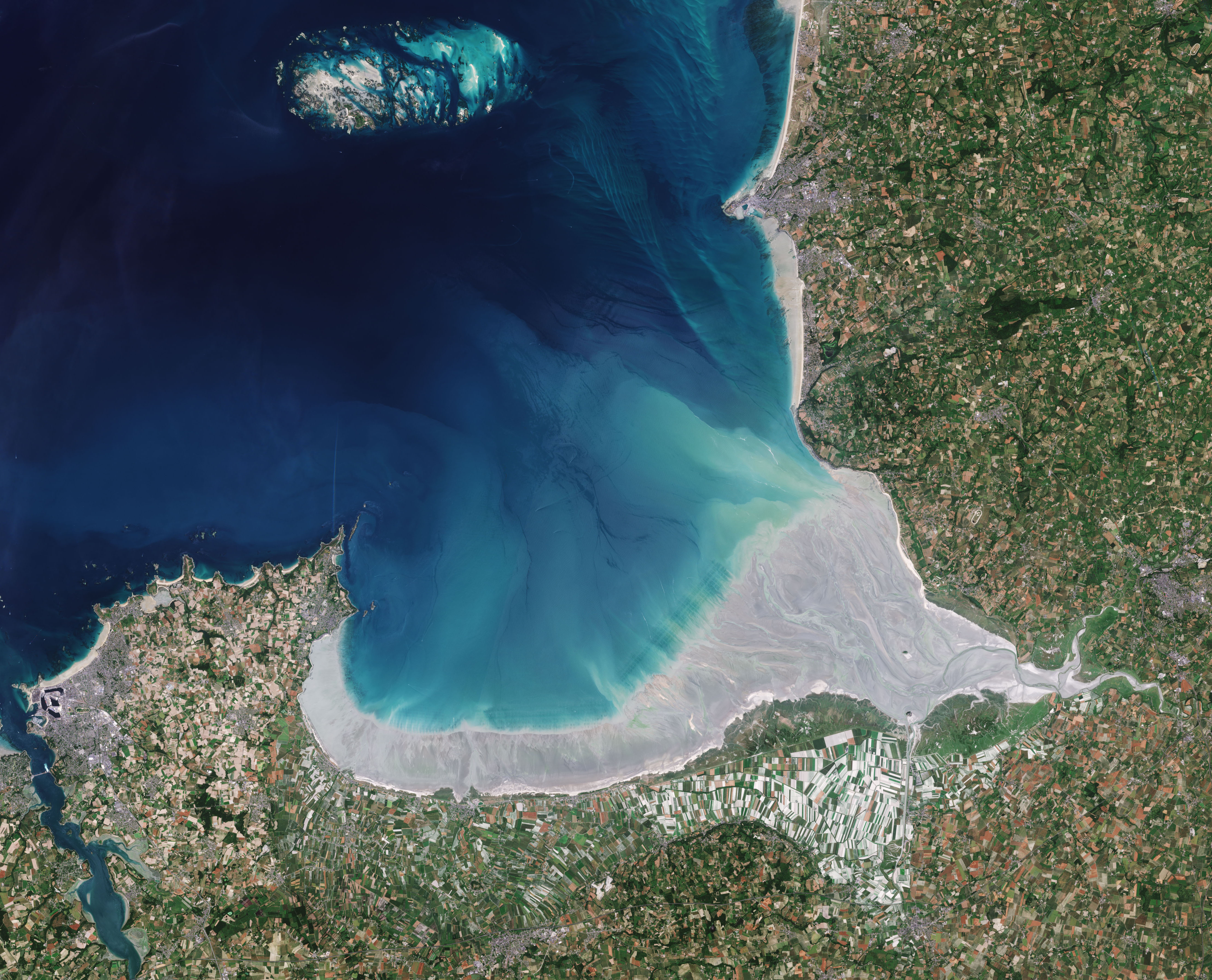
Satellite photo of the Mont-Saint-Michel bay

Mont-Saint-Michel Bay is about 500 km^{2} (190 sq mi) in size.

=== Adjacent towns and villages ===
The following towns and villages surround the bay, from north to south:

- In Normandy : Carolles, Champeaux, Saint-Jean-le-Thomas, Dragey-Ronthon, Genêts, Vains, Marcey-les-Grèves, Avranches, Le Val-Saint-Père, Céaux, Courtils, Huisnes-sur-Mer, Pontorson, Le Mont-Saint-Michel, Beauvoir.
- In Brittany : Saint-Georges-de-Gréhaigne, Roz-sur-Couesnon, Saint-Broladre, Cherrueix, Mont-Dol, Le Vivier-sur-Mer, Hirel, Saint-Benoît-des-Ondes, Saint-Méloir-des-Ondes and Cancale.

== Geography ==
=== Rivers ===
Three small rivers end in the bay (and cross it at low tide): the Couesnon, now blocked to the west of Mont Saint-Michel by a causeway, the Sée and the Sélune. The very low slope of the bay and the very large tides formed a mascaret in those rivers that can travel upstream for many kilometers.

Three larger rivers end in the bay: the Sélune, the Sée and mainly the Couesnon that, accordingly to some local folk stories, was originally the boundary between Normandy and Brittany but then moved to the West of the Mont placing it in Normandy. In reality the boundary is not at the river location but 4 kilometres (2.5 mi) further to the west, at the foot of Mont Saint-Broladre.

=== Biggest tides in Europe ===
Some of the biggest tides in Europe occur in Mont-Saint-Michel Bay: with an average 10 metres (33 ft) amplitude, they reach 12 metres (39 ft) in average and up to 16 metres (52 ft) during the highest tides. This is due in part to the low depth of the bay and the barrier effect from the Cotentin Peninsula.

The ocean moves very fast, both at low and at high tide, up to 10 kilometres (6.2 mi) away. The tides have been described by Victor Hugo as "à la vitesse d'un cheval au galop (as swiftly as a galloping horse)". In reality the full extent of the tides is only visible at the entry of the bay (the sea level around the mont Saint-Michel is above the low tide level) and its actual speed is closer to a walking human, the fastest observed being around 6.1 km/h.

The tides mix the water, creating a rich local ecosystem. The intertidal zone, the coastal area affected by the tides is about 200 km2 wide.

During the highest tide, a tidal bore can be observed—less so since the bay has been under restoration work.

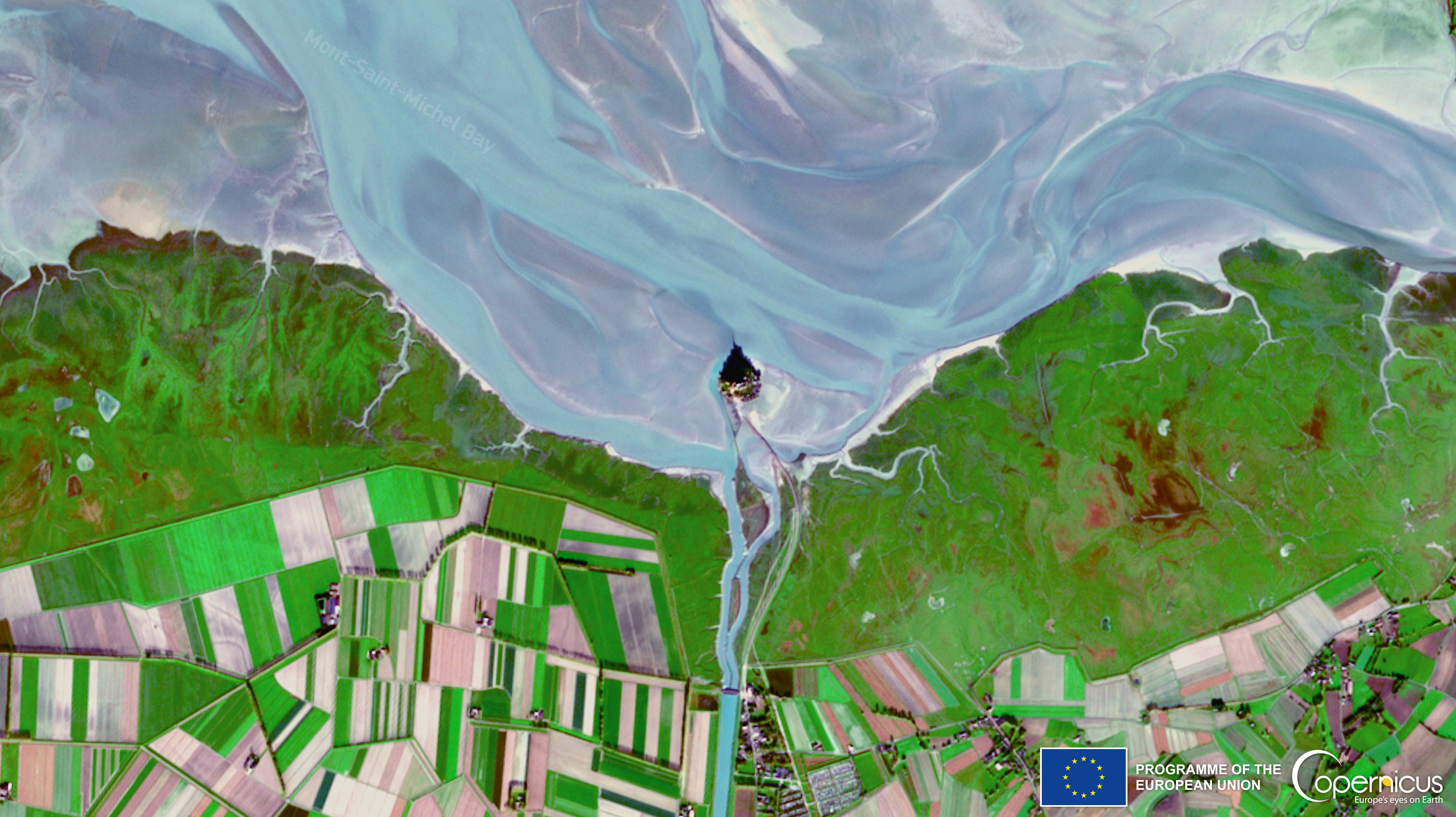
A satellite image of the bay

== Levee and polders ==
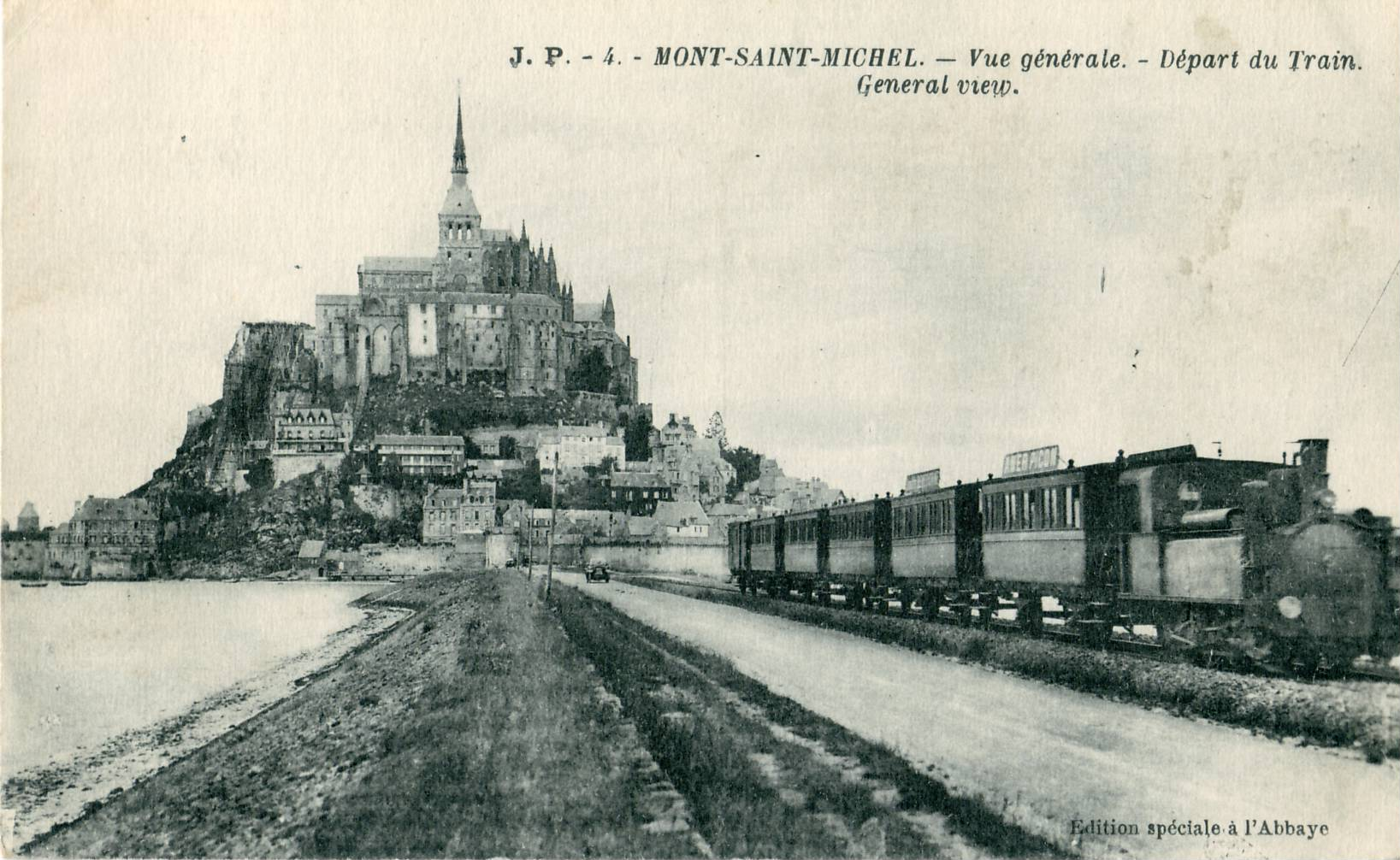
Mont-Saint-Michel train at the bottom of the Mont.

=== The levee ===
Polders have been developed in Mont-Saint-Michel Bay from the 8th century or earlier than that. Between "Pointe de Château-Richeux" and Mont Saint-Broladre seashell deposits have been used to create levees around Dol marsh. To the East of Sainte-Anne chapel is the "Duchesse-Anne" levee. It is 20 kilometres (12 mi) long. It was built during the 11th century using granite rocks. It marks the southern border of the polders.

In 1856, M. Mosselman, founder of the "Cie des Polders de l'Ouest", was given a concession to cultivate 3,800 hectares of shoreline between Sainte-Anne chapel, Moidrey bay, Roche-Torin and the Mont Saint Michel.
