= Bertram de Verdun =

Set of people

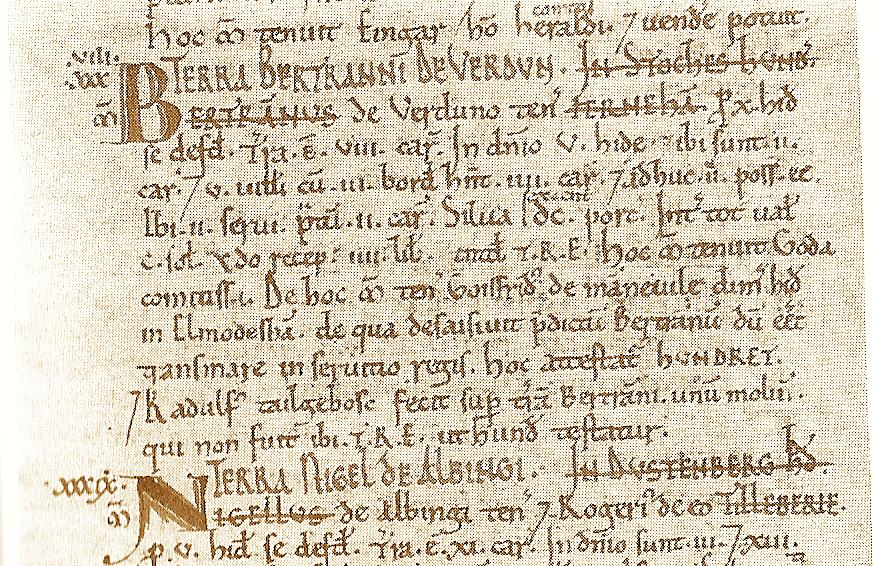
A view of Bertram de Verdun's entry in Domesday Book

Bertram de Verdun was the name of several members of the Norman family of de Verdun, native to the Avranchin.

According to the historian Mark Hagger, the de Verdun family lived originally in Normandy where they held land, and after the Norman conquest of England they were granted land in England. Members of the family appear in original records in Normandy from at least c.1068-1085 when the first Bertram de Verdun attests a charter of Guillaume fitz-Guimond of Avranches, who makes a donation to the Abbey of Mont-Saint-Michel.

== Bertram I de Verdun ==
Bertram I de Verdun appears in the Domesday Book (1086), holding the land and the manor of Farnham Royal in Buckinghamshire, held before the conquest by princess Goda of England. In Domesday Book, Bertram is said to have been in Normandy for William II's business, "duc est transmare in servicio regis", and appears in two charters of William de Saint-Calais, bishop of Durham, and King's chief advisor. Bertram's wife's name is unknown, but his son and heir was Bertram II de Verdun (? – c. 1129/30).

== Bertram II de Verdun ==
Bertram II de Verdun continued to amass land in England, and by 1128 also had been granted land in Staffordshire and Leicestershire. Hagger suggests that he also had assumed an administrative position for Henry I, and was possibly sheriff of Yorkshire in 1100.

== Bertram III de Verdun ==
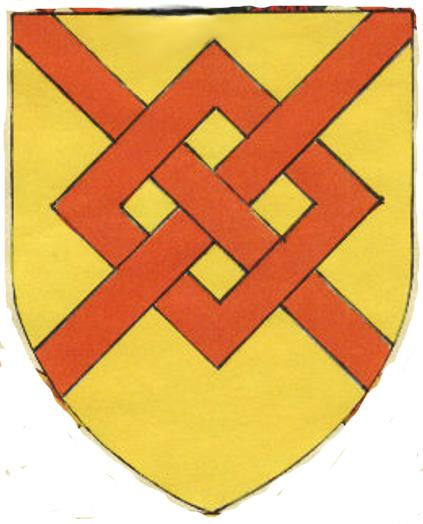
Bertram III de Verdun coat of arms.

Bertram II's grandson was Bertram III de Verdun, one of the familiares of king Henry II. His parents are Norman de Verdun, son of Bertram II, and Lesceline de Clinton, daughter of Geoffrey de Clinton, chamberlain of king Henry I. Bertram would, in the course of his life, hold very high office. He married Matilda (otherwise 'Maud') the daughter of Robert de Ferrers 2nd Earl of Derby. Matilda was a minor and it is unlikely that the marriage was ever consummated; in any event she died young without children. Soon after, Bertram married Rohese and they had eight children. Rohese's parentage is unknown, but some have postulated that she was Rohese de Salford - this is a hypothesis that is likely have arisen from a suggestion that a Rose de Verdun who claimed seven virgates of land in Willen (Buckinghamshire) against Hugh de Salford in 1203 was possibly the daughter of Roger de Salford, who had died before then. Bertram III de Verdun's widow Rohese is recorded as enjoying dower in Kirkby (Lincolnshire), Wiles (Buckinghamshire) and Lutterworth (Leicestershire) The 'Wiles' that Hagger mentions is clearly 'Willen' in Buckinghamshire, and it appears subsequently to have descended with the de Verdun manor of Farnham Royal. Another suggestion of the identity of Rohese is provided by Mark Hagger in a pedigree chart within the 1998 PhD that preceded his 2001 book on the de Verduns - it shows Bertram III de Verdun's 2nd wife's name as Rohais d’Amundeville, but this is likely to have been a textual error, arising from Nicholas de Verdun's daughter Roesia de Verdun’s daughter Matilda marrying 1stly John FitzAlan and after his death 2ndly Richard d’Amundeville. The suggestion that this was an error in the PhD may be confirmed by the fact that Hagger does not give Rohais's name as d'Amundeville in the updated pedigree chart or elsewhere in his later book.

In "The Origins of Some Anglo-Norman Families", it could be read : "In 1166 Bertram de Verdun held two knights' fees in chief. In a return of the knights of Le Mont St-Michel in 1172 there is the entry "Radulfus de Fulgeriis debet unum militem de medietate de Buillun et de Chavei et de quadam parte Olivi. Istud autem servicium debet facere pro eo Bertramnus de Verdum, filius Normanni." The places are Bouillon (Manche, arr. Avranches, cant. Granville) and Chavoy (arr. and cant. Avranches)." The third place is very likely Lolif, (Olivi in Latin, close to Avranches).

In 1168 William Basset of Sapcote was Sheriff of Warwickshire and was accused of misappropriation of treasury monies. Bertram, who was at that time with the king in Caen, was sent, together with Richard de Humez (otherwise 'du Hommet'), Constable of Normandy and Sheriff of Rutland (1155, 1159, 1163 and 1166), to investigate with the result that Bertram was in 1169 given the dual shrievalty of Warwickshire and Leicestershire in Basset's place. Four years later he rebuilt in stone his house at Alton, which had, up to that time, been little more than a wooden hall. In 1179 Bertram founded the Cistercian abbey of Croxden in Staffordshire, settled by monks from abbey of Aunay in Normandy.

At the beginning of the reign of Henry II a papal bull had been obtained authorizing the King to conquer Ireland and bring the Irish church in line with the rest of Europe. Henry had not found the time to act upon it but, in 1169, Dermot MacMurrough, the expelled king of Leinster, together with Richard FitzGilbert (Strongbow) Earl of Pembroke and Clare landed in Ireland. Dublin was taken and held against both Norse and Irish attacks. Henry II decided to go to Ireland to clarify his own position as Strongbow's liege Lord. Bertram de Verdun was appointed Seneschal for the undertaking, that is to say he was responsible for provisions and stores. The expedition left for Waterford on 16 October 1171. Further to this campaign, Bertram received a royal grant of land in Louth, in Ireland, where he held the towns of Drogheda-in-Uriel and Dundalk and several castles.

From 1172 Bertram was one of the king's "Justices in Eyre" (circuit judges) along with William Basset. Later, in 1175, he became one of the regular members of the Curia Regis.

Henry II had undertaken policies to put the kingdom into good order after the anarchy of the previous reign. This however did not meet with everyone's approval and many of the powerful barons rebelled against the crown. The French were not slow in attempting to gain an advantage from the situation and neither were the Scots. Bertram de Verdun, whose lands were in the main surrounded by rebel lords, supported the king and successfully defended Kenilworth. He also fought at Alnwick against the Scots. Here William the Lion, the Scottish King, was taken and shortly afterwards the rebellion was finally put down. Henry Plantagenet was now able to devote his time to completing his reforms in England.

Bertram de Verdun was sheriff of Leicestershire until 1183 but it is unclear as to whether he held this office continually. He spent a good deal of his time in both Ireland and Normandy where he founded or endowed many monastic houses not to mention his patronage in England. He was a close friend of his sovereign Henry II and it is likely that he was with the king in France when Henry became ill in 1189. The king retired to Chinon, where he died on 6 July.

Bertram was a custodian of Pontorson, sheriff of Warwickshire and Leicestershire from 1169 to 1184, itinerant justice, sent to a mission to Spain in 1177, despatched to clear up dangerous muddle in Ireland in 1185, guardian of the heir to the earldom of Chester. Nachos was put in charge of Acre on the Third Crusade and died in Jaffa); and even when not entrusted with a special task, he was to be found constantly with the king Henry II and numbered among his most intimate counselors.

After Henry's death Bertram III remained an influential figure with king Richard I. He became a castellan of the king, and went on crusade to the Holy Land with him. Richard's wish was to lead a crusade and gain glory in the Holy Land by re-taking Jerusalem. Bertram de Verdun set sail with Richard on what has come to be known as the Third Crusade and after many delays (including the king's marriage to Berengaria of Navarre) finally reached Acre in 1191. The Christians lay siege to the city, which soon fell and Bertram together with Stephen Longchamp was appointed as the city's governor. Roger of Howden tells us that Bertram died at Jaffa in 1192 and the Chronicle of Croxden Abbey records that in that year Bertram de Verdun of pious memory founder died and on St. Bartholomew's day was buried at Acre. Hagger, in his history of the de Verdun family, gives the date of St. Bartholomew's Day as 24 August; others give the date at that time as 25 August. This was a few days before the signing of the treaty allowing free passage to Jerusalem for pilgrims. Bertram's death also occurred soon after the battle for Jaffa, which began with Saladin laying siege to the town at the end of July 1192. His forces then stormed the walls and took all of the town with the exception of its citadel. Having received news of Saladin's siege, King Richard took a squadron of ships with a small force of soldiers by sea from Acre to relieve the siege, whilst another force headed south overland. Richard landed at a critical juncture, repelled Saladin's forces who attempted to stop him from landing and re-took Jaffa. Saladin's army returned on 4 August to make a counterattack. The Battle of Jaffa took place on 5 August 1192, in which King Richard's forces gained a victory over those of Saladin. This was the last battle of the Third Crusade. It was later, on 1st or 2 September 1192 that the Treaty of Jaffa was agreed. It is possible, if not likely, that Bertram de Verdun arrived at Jaffa from Acre with King Richard, and the chronology of these events may (or may not) have had a bearing on the timing of Bertram's death.

== Filiation ==
Bertram I de Verdun, († v. 1100)
  │
  └>Bertram II de Verdun, sheriff of York, († v. 1120
      │  
      └>Norman de Verdun, Chamberlain of king Henry I of England,(† v. 1153}
          │
          └>Bertram III de Verdun, crusader and castellan of Richard I of England, († 1192)
              │
              └>Nicholas de Verdun, (? – 1231)
