= Sartilly =

Commune in Manche, France

- Part of Sartilly-Baie-Bocage
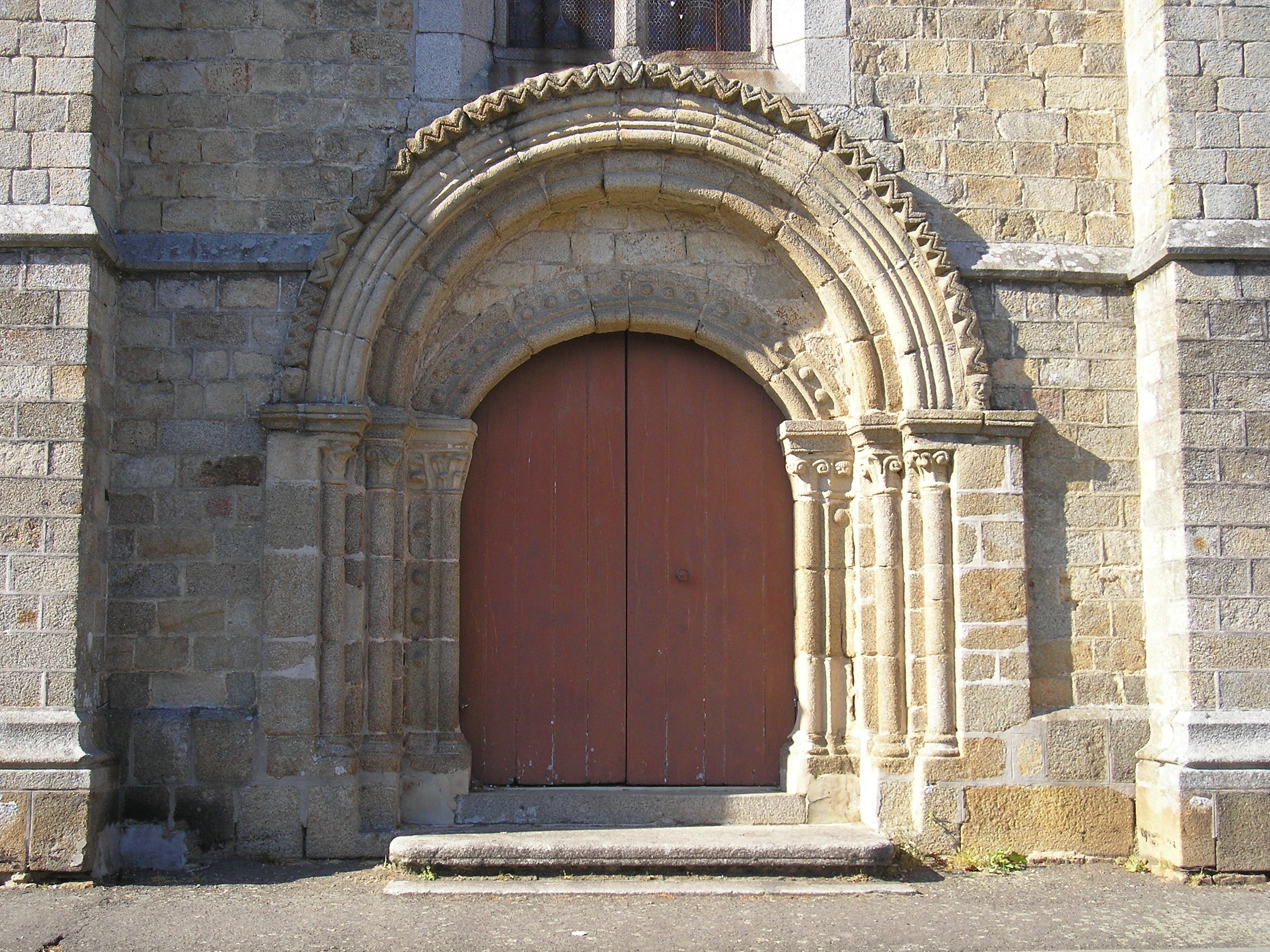
- Romanesque doorway of the Saint-Pair church
- Location of Sartilly
- Location within France Location within Normandy
- Coordinates: 48°45′10″N 1°27′21″W
- Country: France
- Region: Normandy
- Department: Manche
- Arrondissement: Avranches
- Canton: Avranches
- Commune: Sartilly-Baie-Bocage
- Area^{1}: 11.53 km^{2} (4.45 sq mi)
- Elevation: 107 m (351 ft)
- Highest elevation: 119 m (390 ft)
- Lowest elevation: 35 m (115 ft)
- Population (2022): 1,623
  - Density: 140.8/km^{2} (364.6/sq mi)
- Demonym: Sartillais
- Time zone: UTC+01:00 (CET)
  - Summer (DST): UTC+02:00 (CEST)
- Postal code: 50530
- ^{1} French Land Register data, which excludes lakes, ponds, glaciers > 1 km^{2} (0.386 sq mi or 247 acres) and river estuaries.

Sartilly (French pronunciation: [saʁtiji]) is a former commune in the Manche department in Normandy in north-western France. On 1 January 2016, it was merged into the new commune of Sartilly-Baie-Bocage.

== See also ==
- Communes of the Manche department
