= Champcey =

- Part of Sartilly-Baie-Bocage
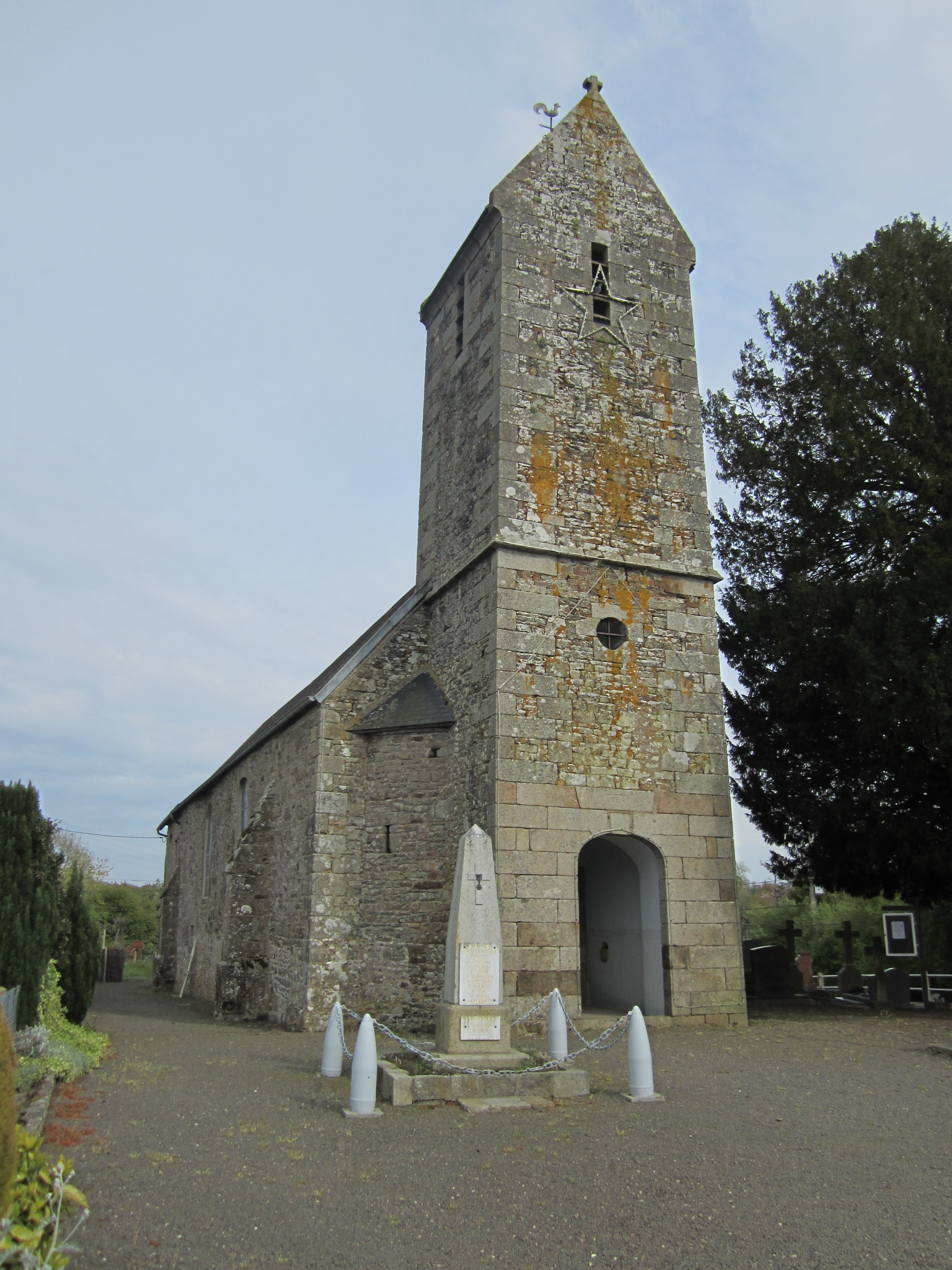
- The church of Notre-Dame
- Location of Champcey
- Location within France Location within Normandy
- Coordinates: 48°43′36″N 1°26′43″W
- Country: France
- Region: Normandy
- Department: Manche
- Arrondissement: Avranches
- Canton: Avranches
- Commune: Sartilly-Baie-Bocage
- Area^{1}: 3.24 km^{2} (1.25 sq mi)
- Elevation: 96 m (315 ft)
- Highest elevation: 105 m (344 ft)
- Lowest elevation: 20 m (66 ft)
- Population (2022): 236
  - Density: 72.8/km^{2} (189/sq mi)
- Time zone: UTC+01:00 (CET)
  - Summer (DST): UTC+02:00 (CEST)
- Postal code: 50530
- ^{1} French Land Register data, which excludes lakes, ponds, glaciers > 1 km^{2} (0.386 sq mi or 247 acres) and river estuaries.

Champcey (French pronunciation: [ʃɑ̃sɛ]) is a former commune in the Manche department in Normandy in north-western France. On 1 January 2016, it was merged into the new commune of Sartilly-Baie-Bocage.

== See also ==
- Communes of the Manche department
