= La Rochelle-Normande =

- Part of Sartilly-Baie-Bocage
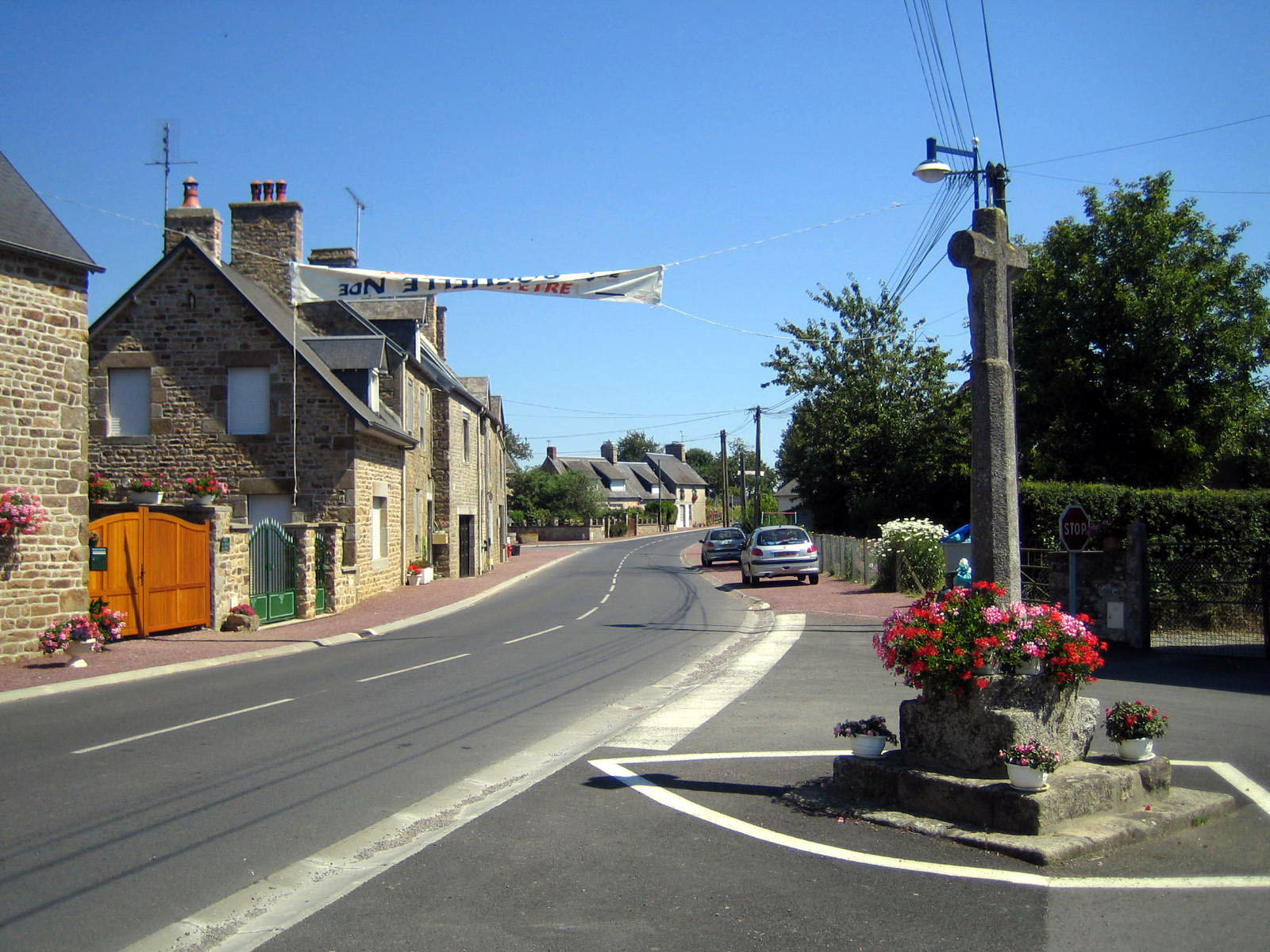
- The intersection of the Cross
- Location of La Rochelle-Normande
- Location within France Location within Normandy
- Coordinates: 48°45′57″N 1°26′00″W
- Country: France
- Region: Normandy
- Department: Manche
- Arrondissement: Avranches
- Canton: Avranches
- Commune: Sartilly-Baie-Bocage
- Area^{1}: 7.53 km^{2} (2.91 sq mi)
- Elevation: 110 m (360 ft)
- Highest elevation: 126 m (413 ft)
- Lowest elevation: 44 m (144 ft)
- Population (2022): 352
  - Density: 46.7/km^{2} (121/sq mi)
- Time zone: UTC+01:00 (CET)
  - Summer (DST): UTC+02:00 (CEST)
- Postal code: 50530
- ^{1} French Land Register data, which excludes lakes, ponds, glaciers > 1 km^{2} (0.386 sq mi or 247 acres) and river estuaries.

La Rochelle-Normande (French pronunciation: [la ʁɔʃɛl nɔʁmɑ̃d]) is a former commune in the Manche department in Normandy in north-western France. On 1 January 2016, it was merged into the new commune of Sartilly-Baie-Bocage.

== See also ==
- Communes of the Manche department
