= Montviron =

- Part of Sartilly-Baie-Bocage
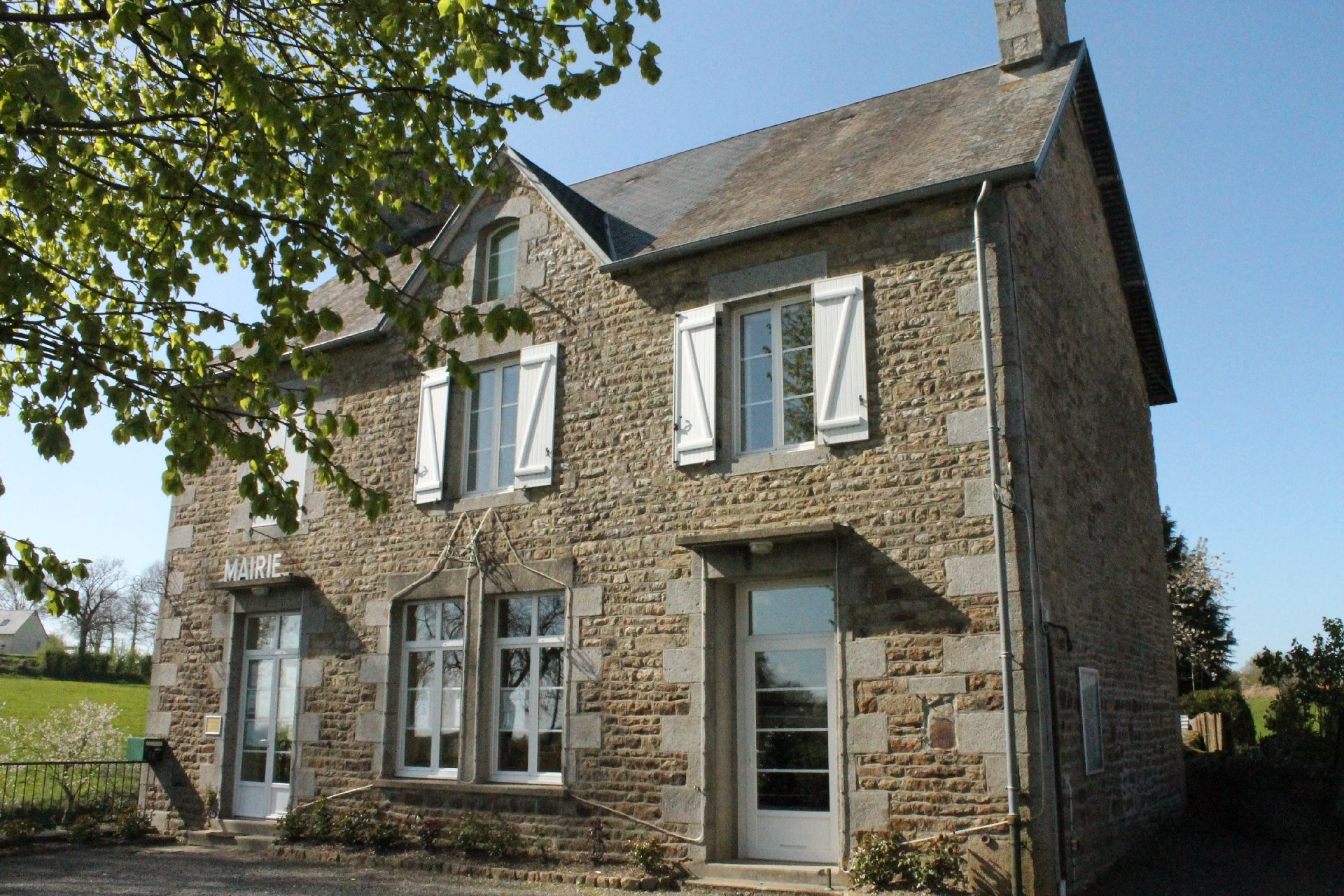
- Town hall
- Location of Montviron
- Location within France Location within Normandy
- Coordinates: 48°44′18″N 1°25′09″W
- Country: France
- Region: Normandy
- Department: Manche
- Arrondissement: Avranches
- Canton: Avranches
- Commune: Sartilly-Baie-Bocage
- Area^{1}: 5.91 km^{2} (2.28 sq mi)
- Elevation: 91 m (299 ft)
- Highest elevation: 121 m (397 ft)
- Lowest elevation: 27 m (89 ft)
- Population (2022): 344
  - Density: 58.2/km^{2} (151/sq mi)
- Time zone: UTC+01:00 (CET)
  - Summer (DST): UTC+02:00 (CEST)
- Postal code: 50530
- ^{1} French Land Register data, which excludes lakes, ponds, glaciers > 1 km^{2} (0.386 sq mi or 247 acres) and river estuaries.

Montviron (French pronunciation: [mɔ̃viʁɔ̃]) is a former commune in the Manche department in Normandy in north-western France. On 1 January 2016, it was merged into the new commune of Sartilly-Baie-Bocage.

== See also ==
- Communes of the Manche department
