= Angey =

- Part of Sartilly-Baie-Bocage
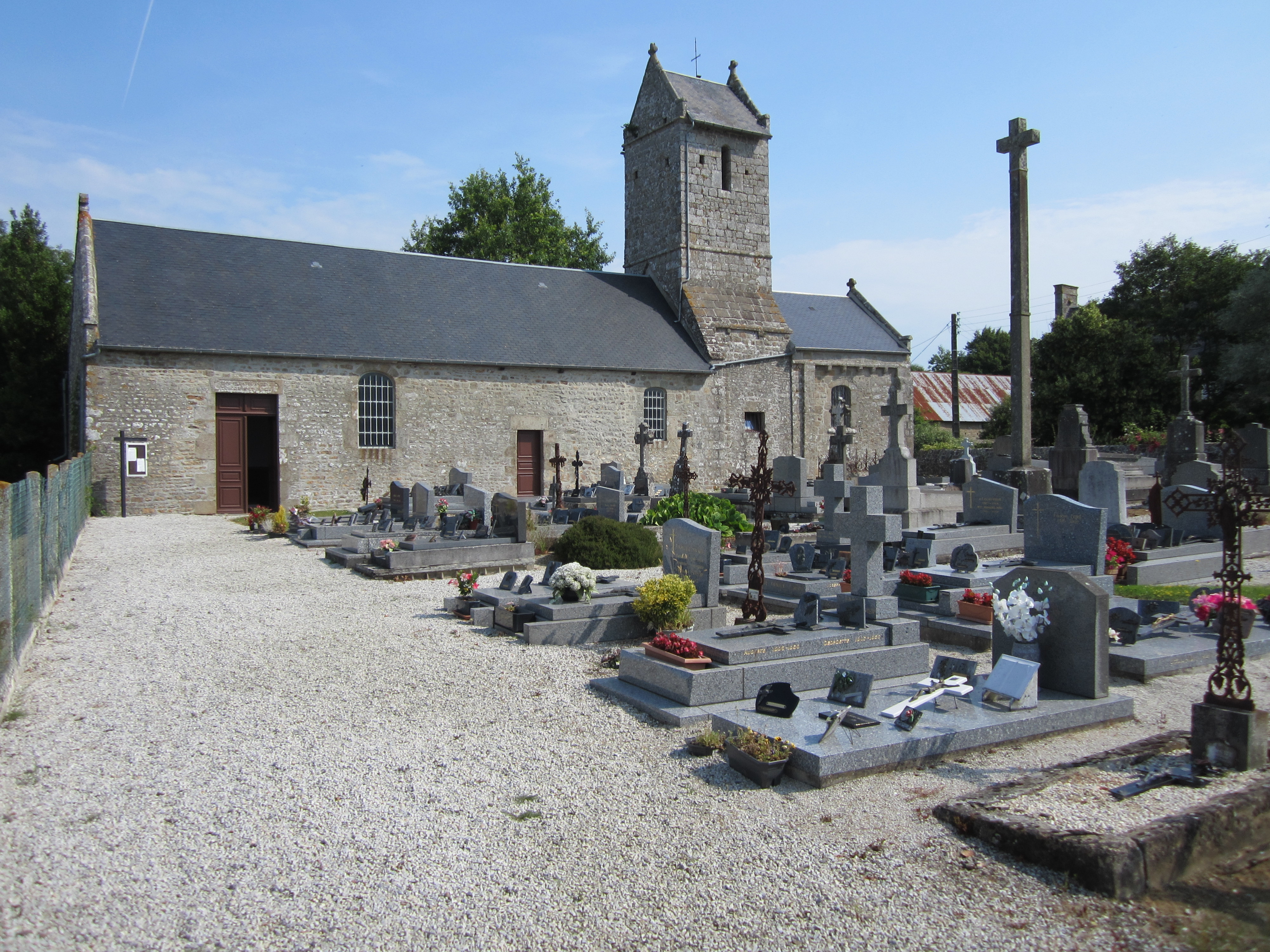
- The church of Saint-Samson
- Location of Angey
- Location within France Location within Normandy
- Coordinates: 48°45′05″N 1°29′23″W
- Country: France
- Region: Normandy
- Department: Manche
- Arrondissement: Avranches
- Canton: Avranches
- Commune: Sartilly-Baie-Bocage
- Area^{1}: 2.47 km^{2} (0.95 sq mi)
- Elevation: 113 m (371 ft)
- Highest elevation: 121 m (397 ft)
- Lowest elevation: 85 m (279 ft)
- Population (2023): 254
  - Density: 103/km^{2} (266/sq mi)
- Time zone: UTC+01:00 (CET)
  - Summer (DST): UTC+02:00 (CEST)
- Postal code: 50530
- ^{1} French Land Register data, which excludes lakes, ponds, glaciers > 1 km^{2} (0.386 sq mi or 247 acres) and river estuaries.

Angey (French pronunciation: [ɑʒeː]) is a former commune in the Manche department in the Normandy region in northwestern France. On 1 January 2016, it was merged into the new commune of Sartilly-Baie-Bocage.

== See also ==
- Communes of the Manche department
