= Jullouville =

- Commune
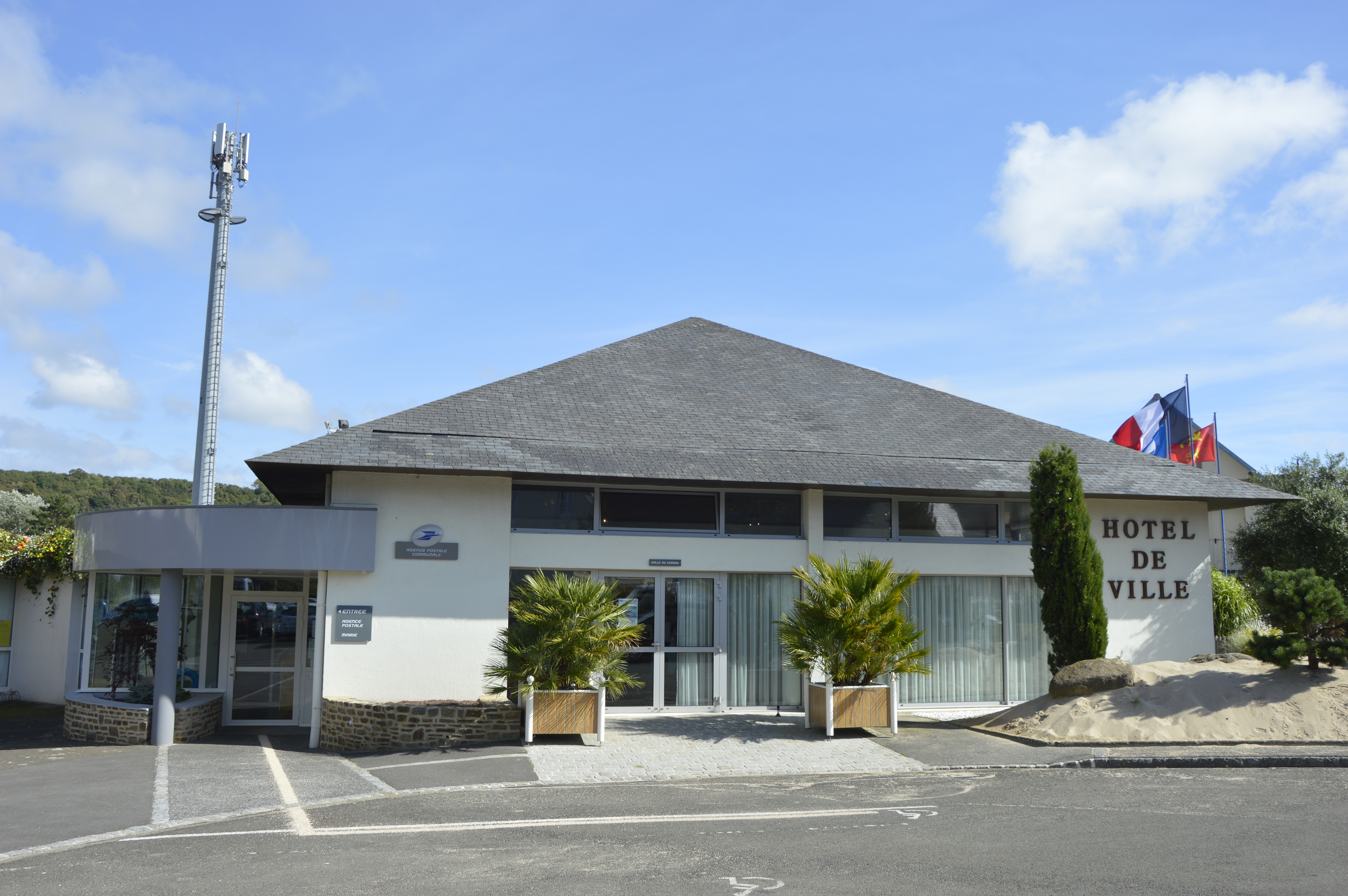
- The town hall in Jullouville
- Location of Jullouville
- Location within France Location within Normandy
- Coordinates: 48°46′15″N 1°34′02″W
- Country: France
- Region: Normandy
- Department: Manche
- Arrondissement: Avranches
- Canton: Avranches
- Intercommunality: Granville, Terre et Mer

Government
  - Mayor (2020–2026): Alain Brière
- Area^{1}: 21.88 km^{2} (8.45 sq mi)
- Highest elevation: 115 m (377 ft)
- Lowest elevation: 0 m (0 ft)
- Population (2023): 2,394
  - Density: 109.4/km^{2} (283.4/sq mi)
- Time zone: UTC+01:00 (CET)
  - Summer (DST): UTC+02:00 (CEST)
- INSEE/Postal code: 50066 /50610
- ^{1} French Land Register data, which excludes lakes, ponds, glaciers > 1 km^{2} (0.386 sq mi or 247 acres) and river estuaries.

Jullouville (French: [ʒyluvil]) is a commune in the Manche department in north-western France. It was created in 1973 by the merger of the former communes Bouillon, Saint-Pair-sur-Mer, Carolles and Saint-Michel-des-Loups. Saint-Pair-sur-Mer and Carolles were recreated as independent communes in resp. 1978 and 2000.

== Population ==
Population data refer to the area corresponding with the commune as of January 2025.

Historical population
Year	Pop.	±% p.a.
1968	1,164	—
1975	1,263	+1.17%
1982	1,361	+1.07%
1990	1,492	+1.16%
1999	1,757	+1.83%
2007	2,098	+2.24%
2012	2,372	+2.49%
2017	2,312	−0.51%
2023	2,394	+0.58%
Source: INSEE

== Heraldry ==
Arms of Jullouville	The arms of Jullouville are blazoned : Argent, 3 ducks sable.

== Gallery ==
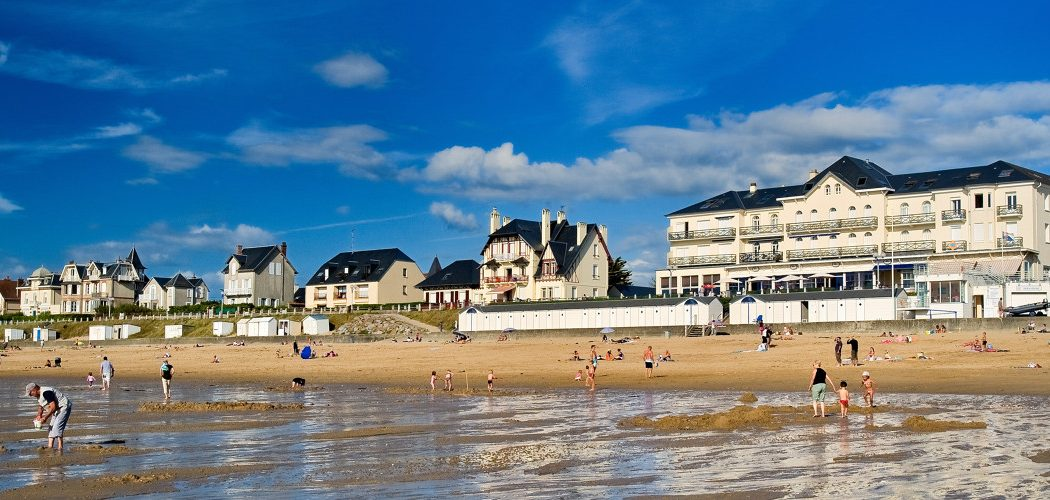

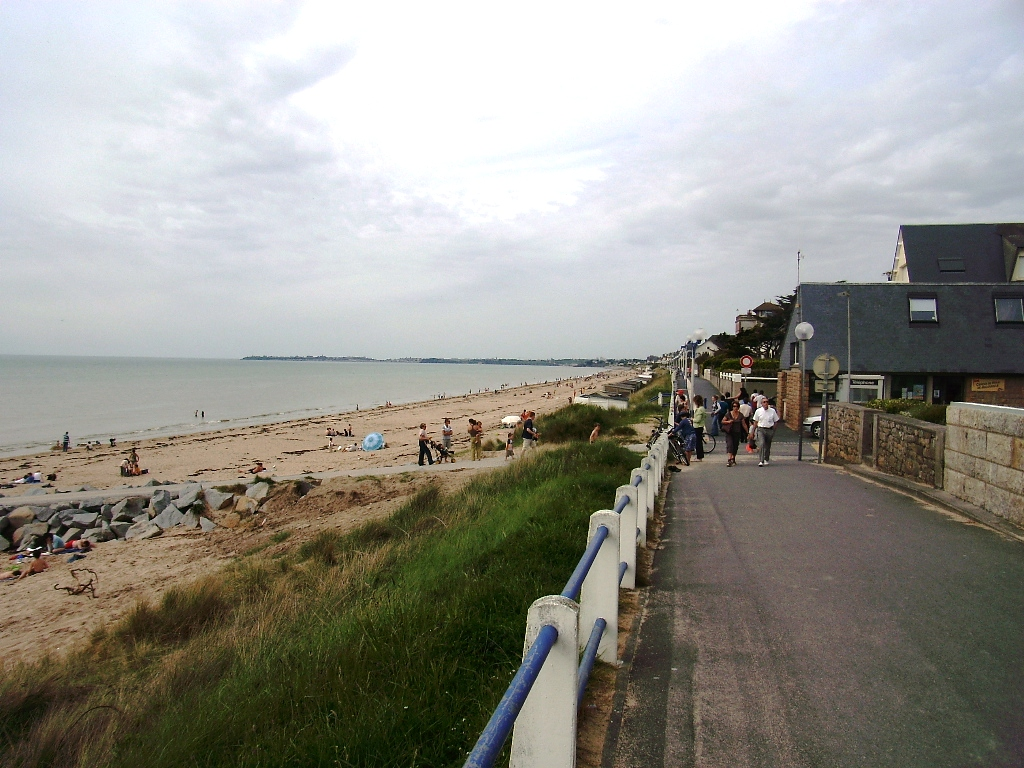

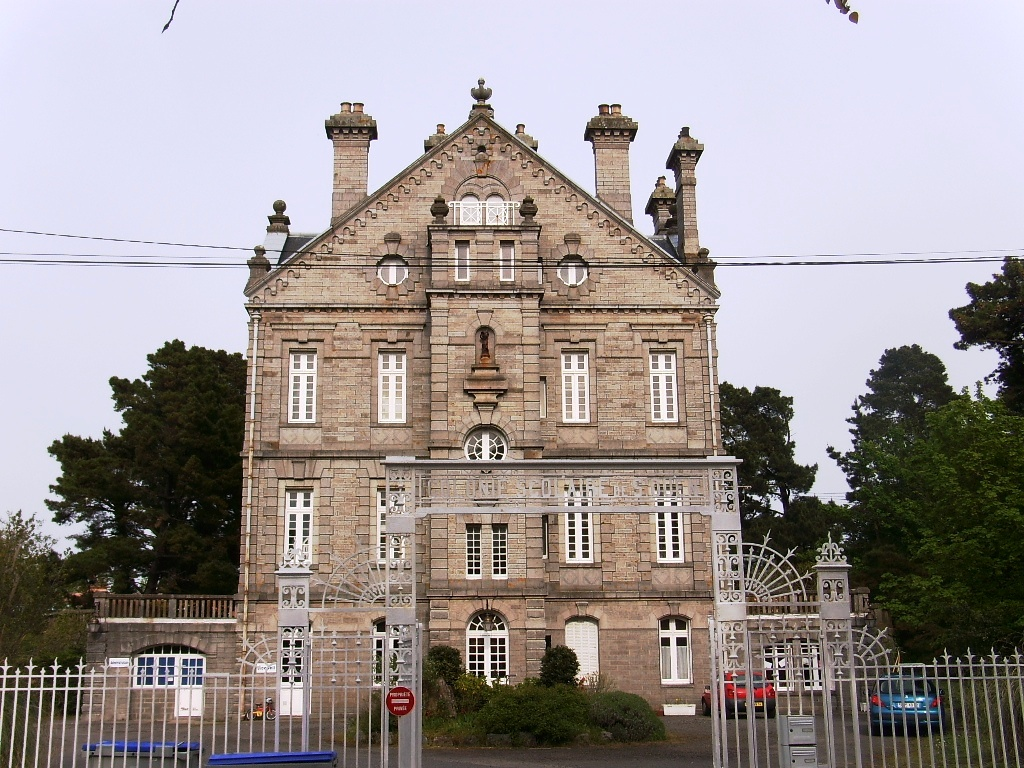

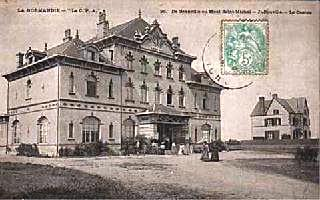

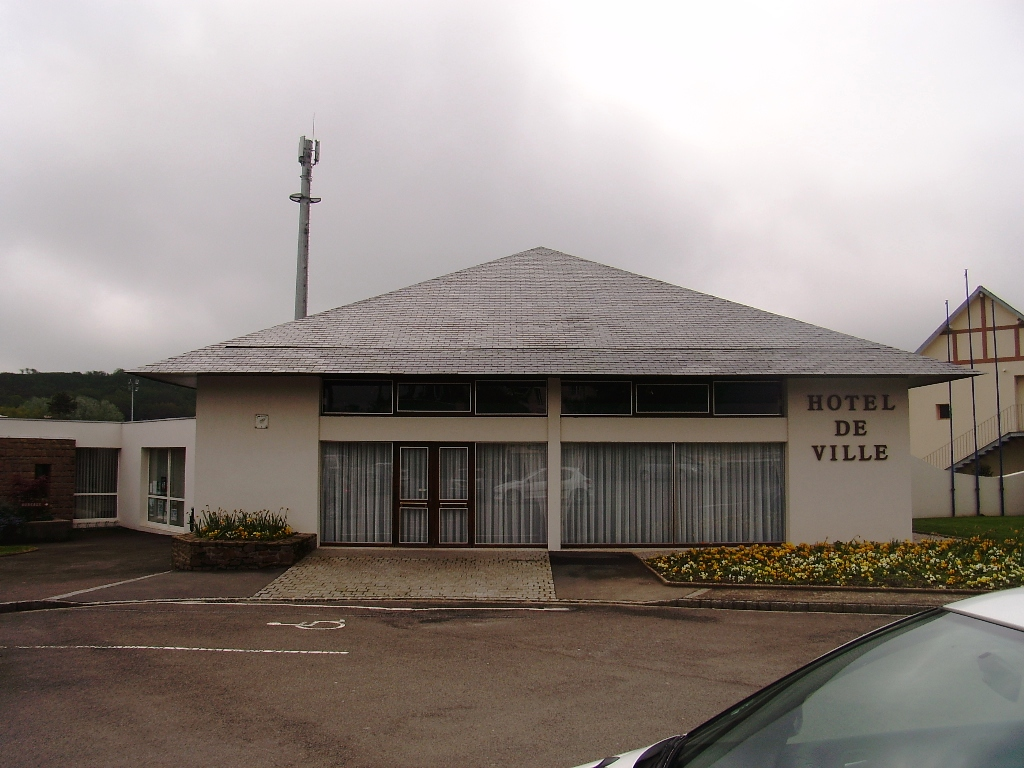

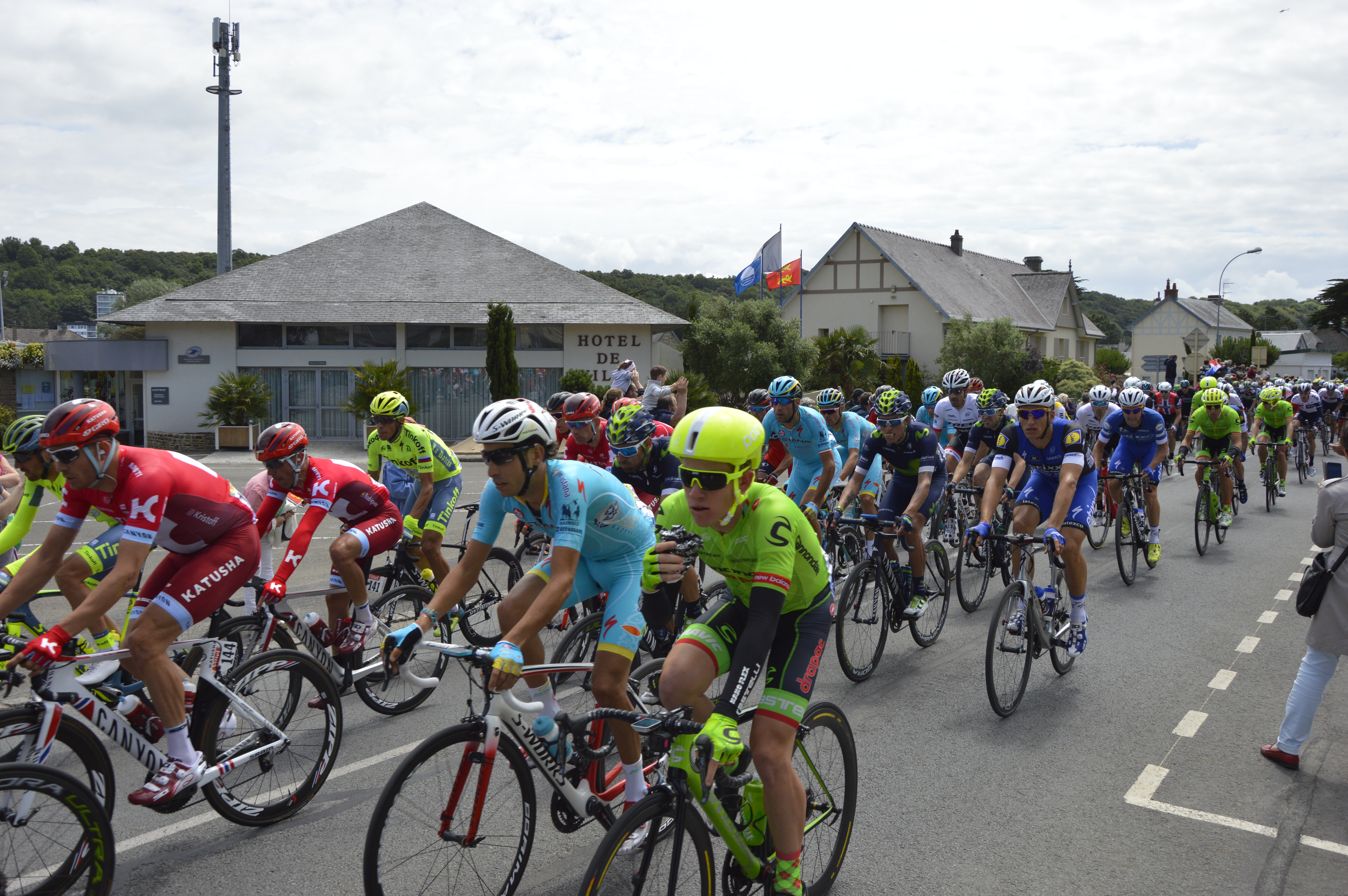

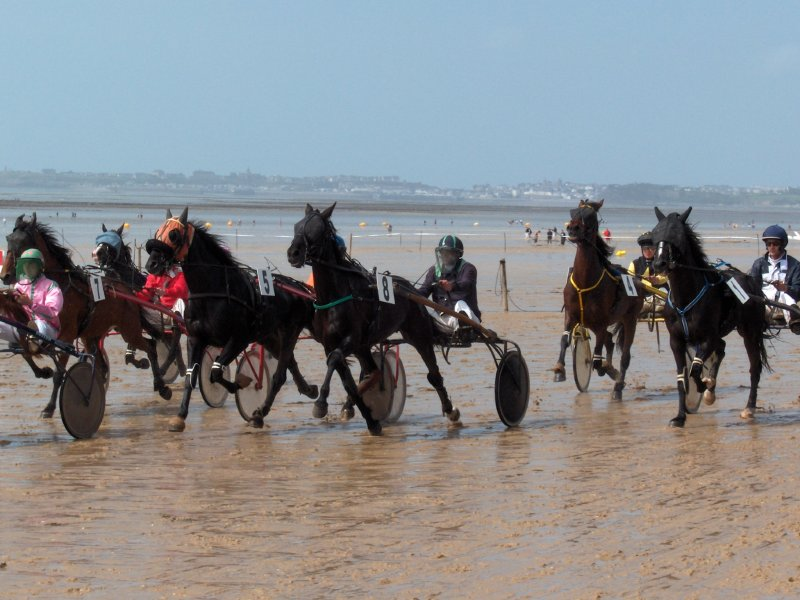

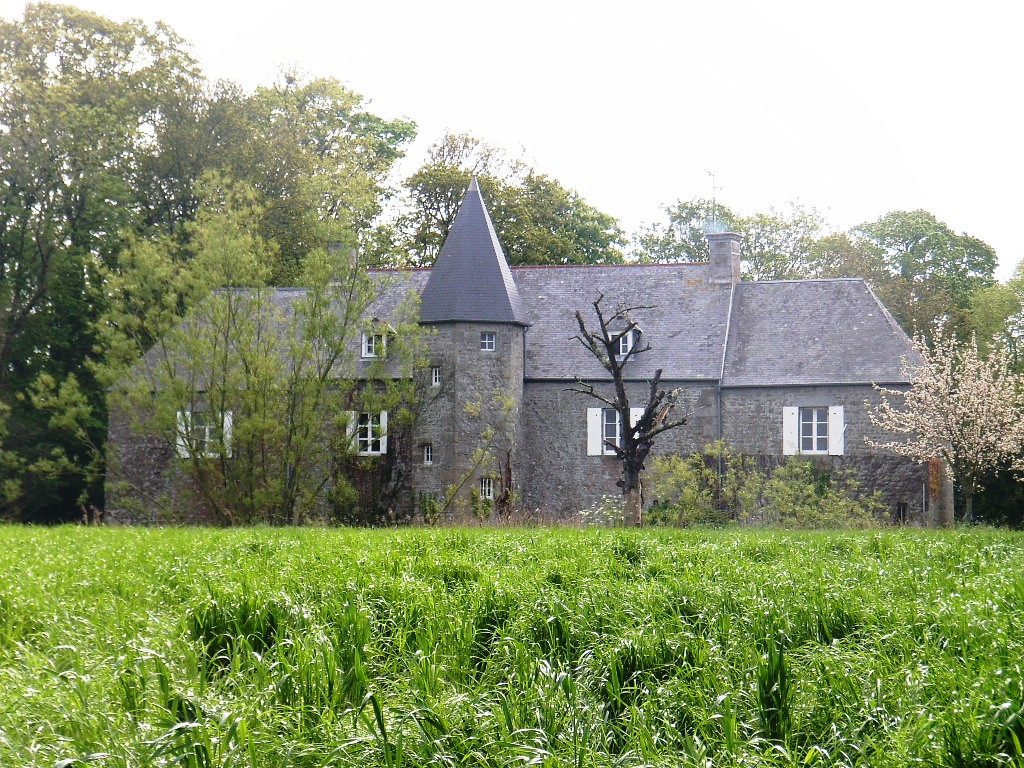

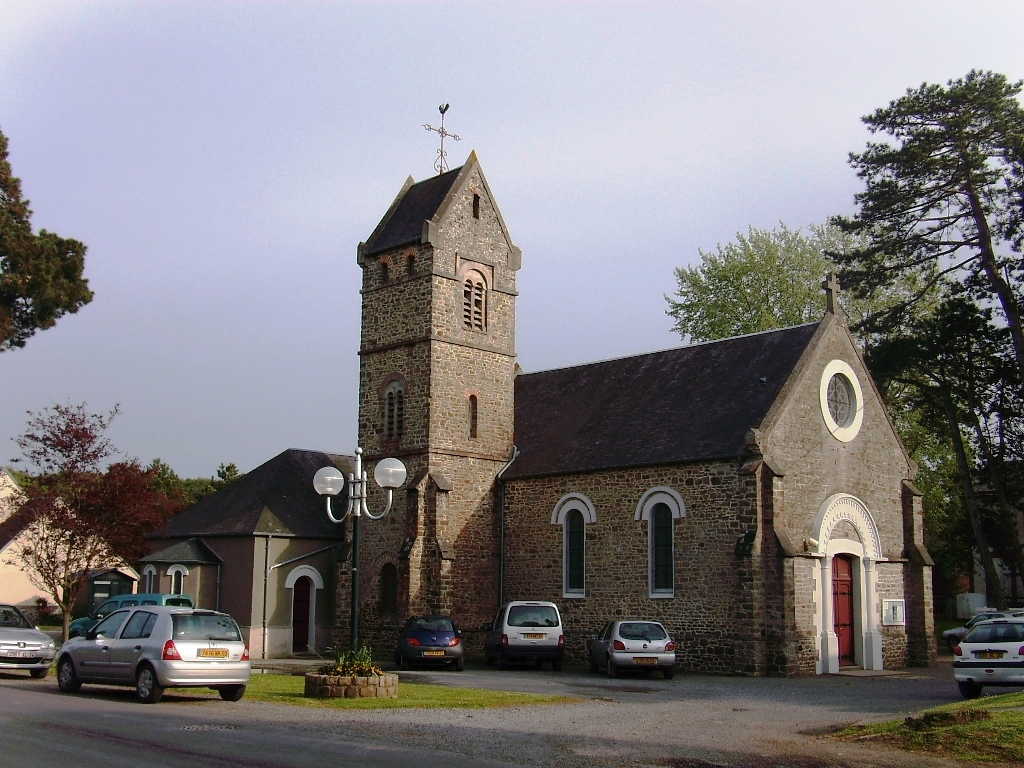

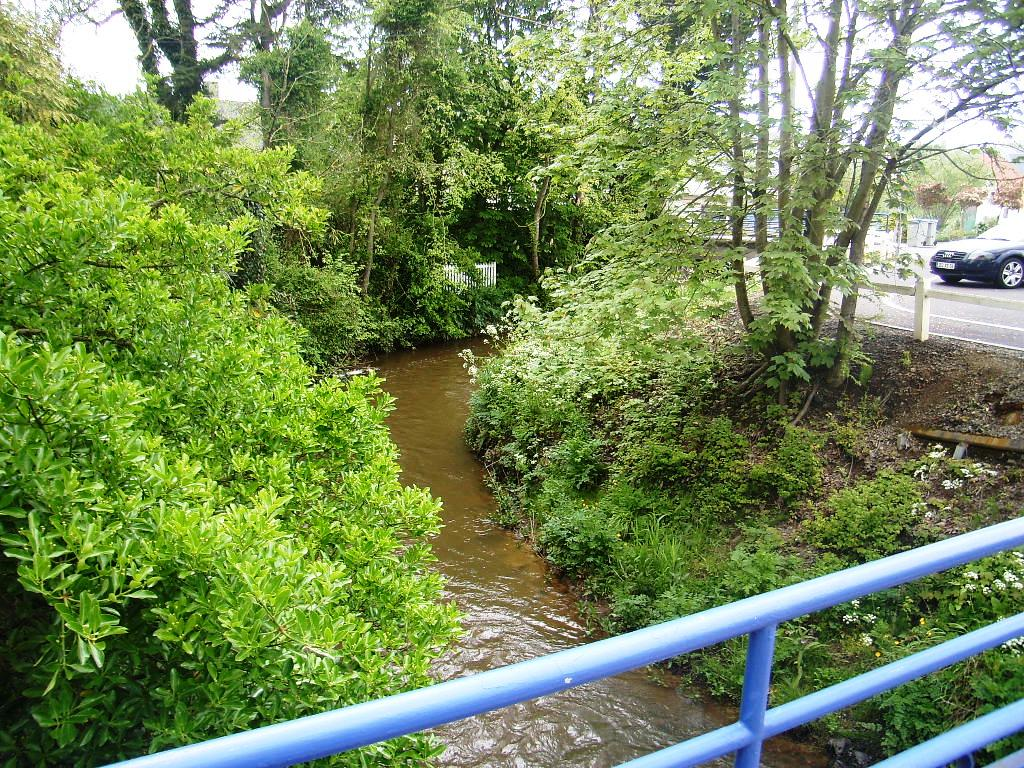

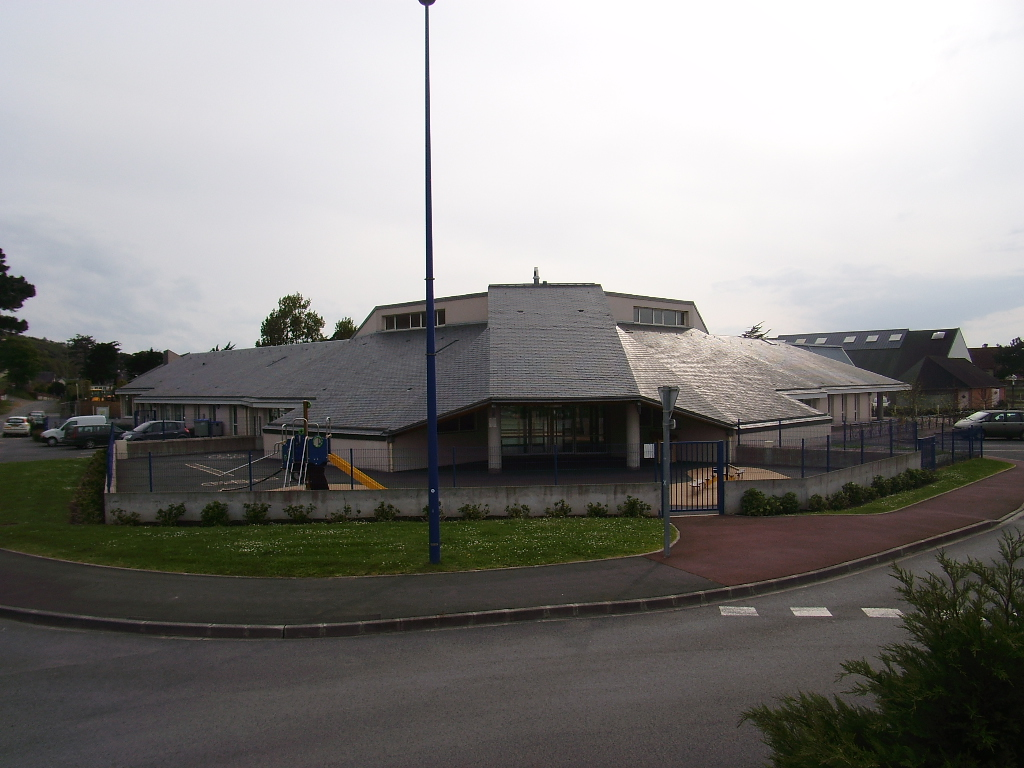

== See also ==
- Communes of the Manche department
- Groussey
