= Bacilly =

- Commune
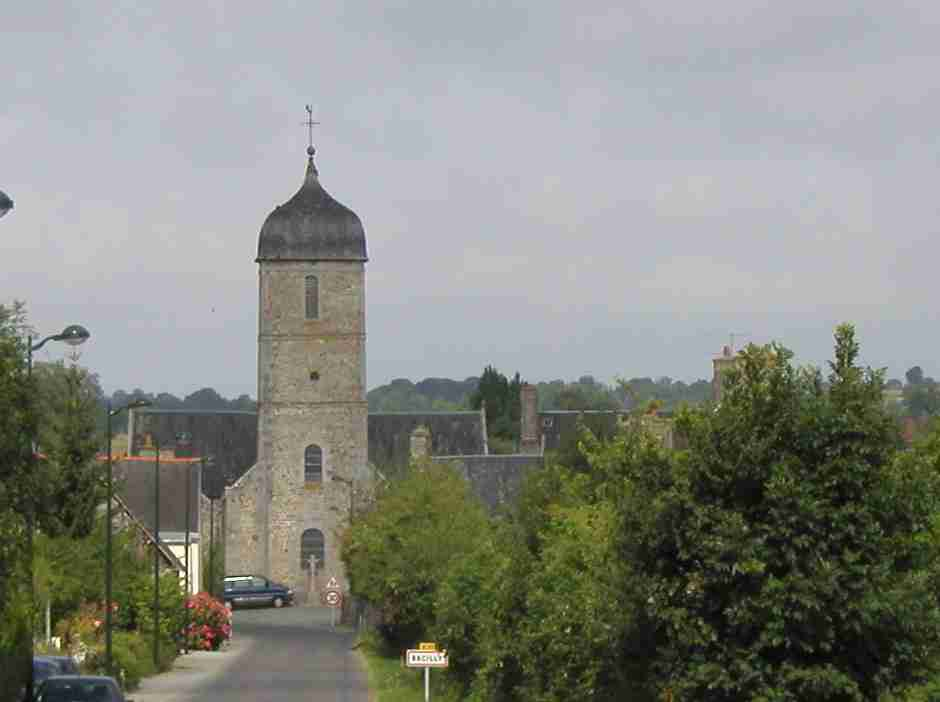
- Village view
- Location of Bacilly
- Location within France Location within Normandy
- Coordinates: 48°42′06″N 1°26′23″W
- Country: France
- Region: Normandy
- Department: Manche
- Arrondissement: Avranches
- Canton: Avranches
- Intercommunality: CA Mont-Saint-Michel-Normandie

Government
  - Mayor (2020–2026): Eric Quinton
- Area^{1}: 15.88 km^{2} (6.13 sq mi)
- Elevation: 14 m (46 ft)
- Highest elevation: 75 m (246 ft)
- Lowest elevation: 7 m (23 ft)
- Population (2023): 921
  - Density: 58.0/km^{2} (150/sq mi)
- Time zone: UTC+01:00 (CET)
  - Summer (DST): UTC+02:00 (CEST)
- INSEE/Postal code: 50027 /50530
- ^{1} French Land Register data, which excludes lakes, ponds, glaciers > 1 km^{2} (0.386 sq mi or 247 acres) and river estuaries.

Bacilly is a commune in the Manche department in the Normandy region in northwestern France.

== Population ==
Historical population
Year	Pop.	±% p.a.
1968	781	—
1975	691	−1.73%
1982	673	−0.38%
1990	644	−0.55%
1999	670	+0.44%
2007	785	+2.00%
2012	900	+2.77%
2017	935	+0.77%
2023	921	−0.25%
Source: INSEE

== See also ==
- Communes of the Manche department
