= Saint-Pierre-Langers =

- Commune
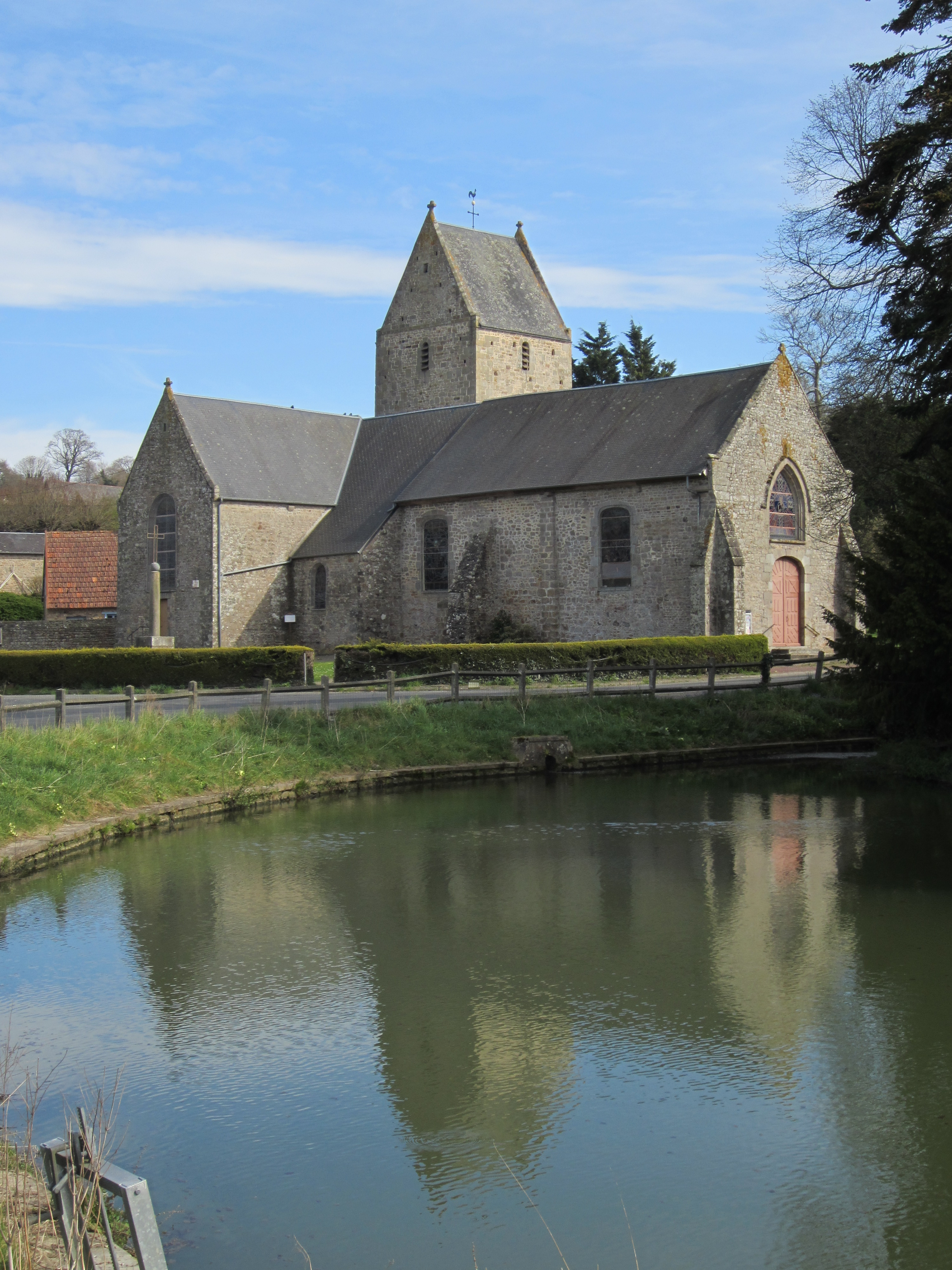
- The church of Saint-Pierre

- Coat of arms
- Location of Saint-Pierre-Langers
- Location within France Location within Normandy
- Coordinates: 48°47′07″N 1°29′47″W
- Country: France
- Region: Normandy
- Department: Manche
- Arrondissement: Avranches
- Canton: Avranches

Government
  - Mayor (2023–2026): Pascal Lemaitre
- Area^{1}: 8.40 km^{2} (3.24 sq mi)
- Elevation: 40 m (130 ft)
- Highest elevation: 121 m (397 ft)
- Lowest elevation: 7 m (23 ft)
- Population (2023): 617
  - Density: 73.5/km^{2} (190/sq mi)
- Time zone: UTC+01:00 (CET)
  - Summer (DST): UTC+02:00 (CEST)
- INSEE/Postal code: 50540 /50530
- ^{1} French Land Register data, which excludes lakes, ponds, glaciers > 1 km^{2} (0.386 sq mi or 247 acres) and river estuaries.

Saint-Pierre-Langers (French pronunciation: [sɛ̃ pjɛʁ lɑ̃ʒe]) is a commune in the Manche department in Normandy in north-western France.

== Heraldry ==
Arms of Saint-Pierre-Langers	The arms of Saint-Pierre-Langers are blazoned : Or, a cross gules, on a chief azure 2 mullets argent. These arms are borrowed from the L'Empereur family, lords of Saint-Pierre-Langers.

== Personalities linked to the commune ==
- Philippe Badin, 18th abbot of La Lucerne Abbey (?-1452), who laid the first stone at the fortress of Granville.
- Anatole France, stayed here twice in his youth and described the commune in a chapter 11 of La Vie en fleur.

== See also ==
- Communes of the Manche department
