= Saint-Jean-de-la-Haize =

- Commune
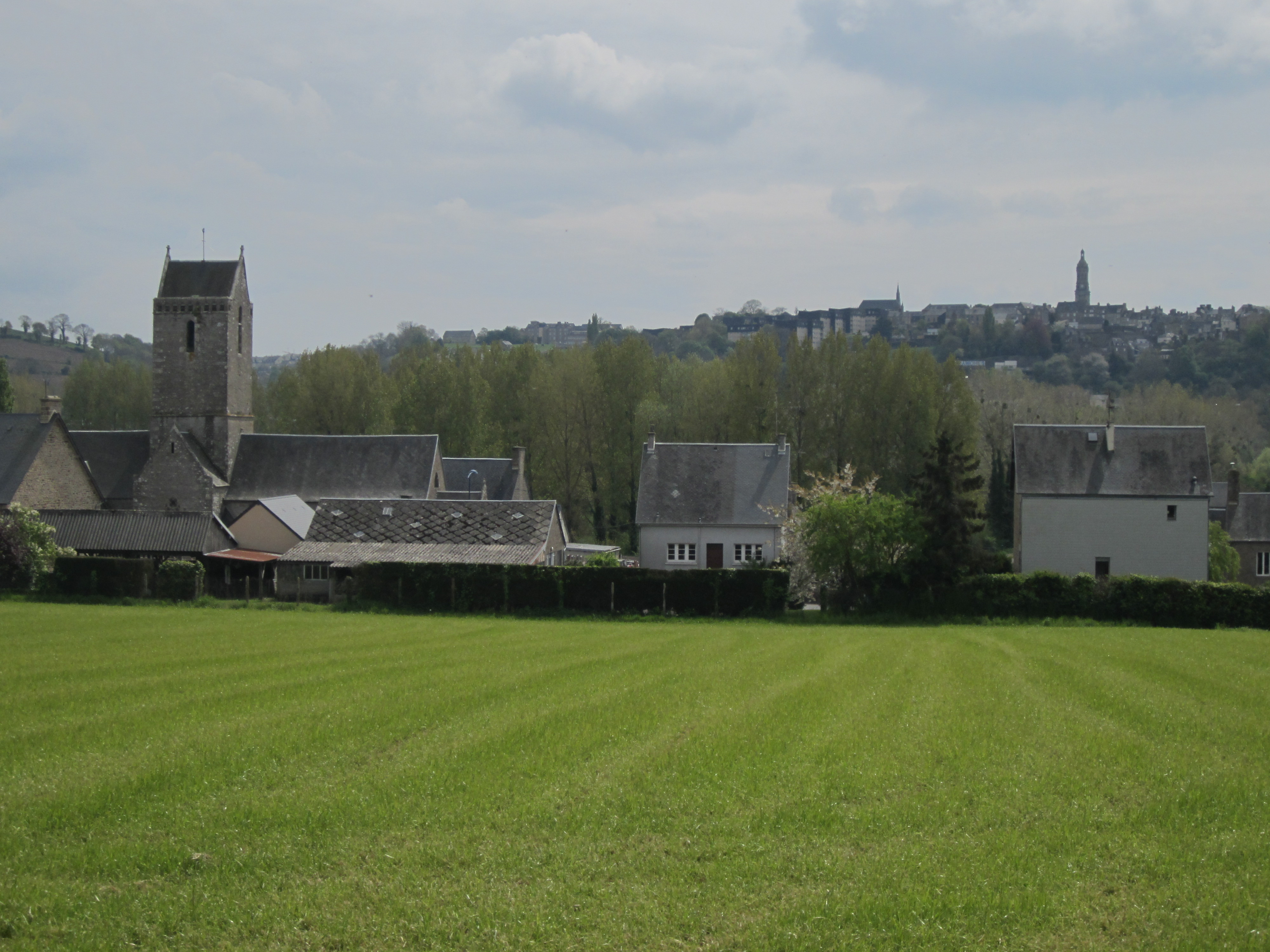
- Village view
- Location of Saint-Jean-de-la-Haize
- Location within France Location within Normandy
- Coordinates: 48°42′17″N 1°21′34″W
- Country: France
- Region: Normandy
- Department: Manche
- Arrondissement: Avranches
- Canton: Avranches
- Intercommunality: CA Mont-Saint-Michel-Normandie

Government
  - Mayor (2020–2026): Sylvie Guérault
- Area^{1}: 8.95 km^{2} (3.46 sq mi)
- Elevation: 11 m (36 ft)
- Highest elevation: 128 m (420 ft)
- Lowest elevation: 7 m (23 ft)
- Population (2023): 535
  - Density: 59.8/km^{2} (155/sq mi)
- Time zone: UTC+01:00 (CET)
  - Summer (DST): UTC+02:00 (CEST)
- INSEE/Postal code: 50489 /50300
- ^{1} French Land Register data, which excludes lakes, ponds, glaciers > 1 km^{2} (0.386 sq mi or 247 acres) and river estuaries.

Saint-Jean-de-la-Haize (French pronunciation: [sɛ̃ ʒɑ̃ də la ɛz]) is a commune in the Manche department in Normandy in north-western France.

== See also ==
- Communes of the Manche department
