= Groussey =

Village in Normandy, France

Coordinates: 48°45′40″N 1°33′17″W

Groussey (French pronunciation: [ɡʁusɛ]) is a village in the commune Jullouville, in the Manche département of Normandy, France. It is located 600 m from the sea in the bay of Mont Saint-Michel. The nearest two villages are Carolles (to the south) and Bouillon (to the north). A coast road passes to the west (D911) from Carolles in the south through Edenville to Jullouville. Jullouville is a major seaside resort in the summer months. Groussey shares the same postal (zip) code as Jullouville, 50610.

Groussey is a tiny settlement, little more than a collection of houses bordering the road, with a couple of side roads including Impasse Des Verts Pres. It is bordered by fields to the west.
