= Sartilly-Baie-Bocage =

- Commune
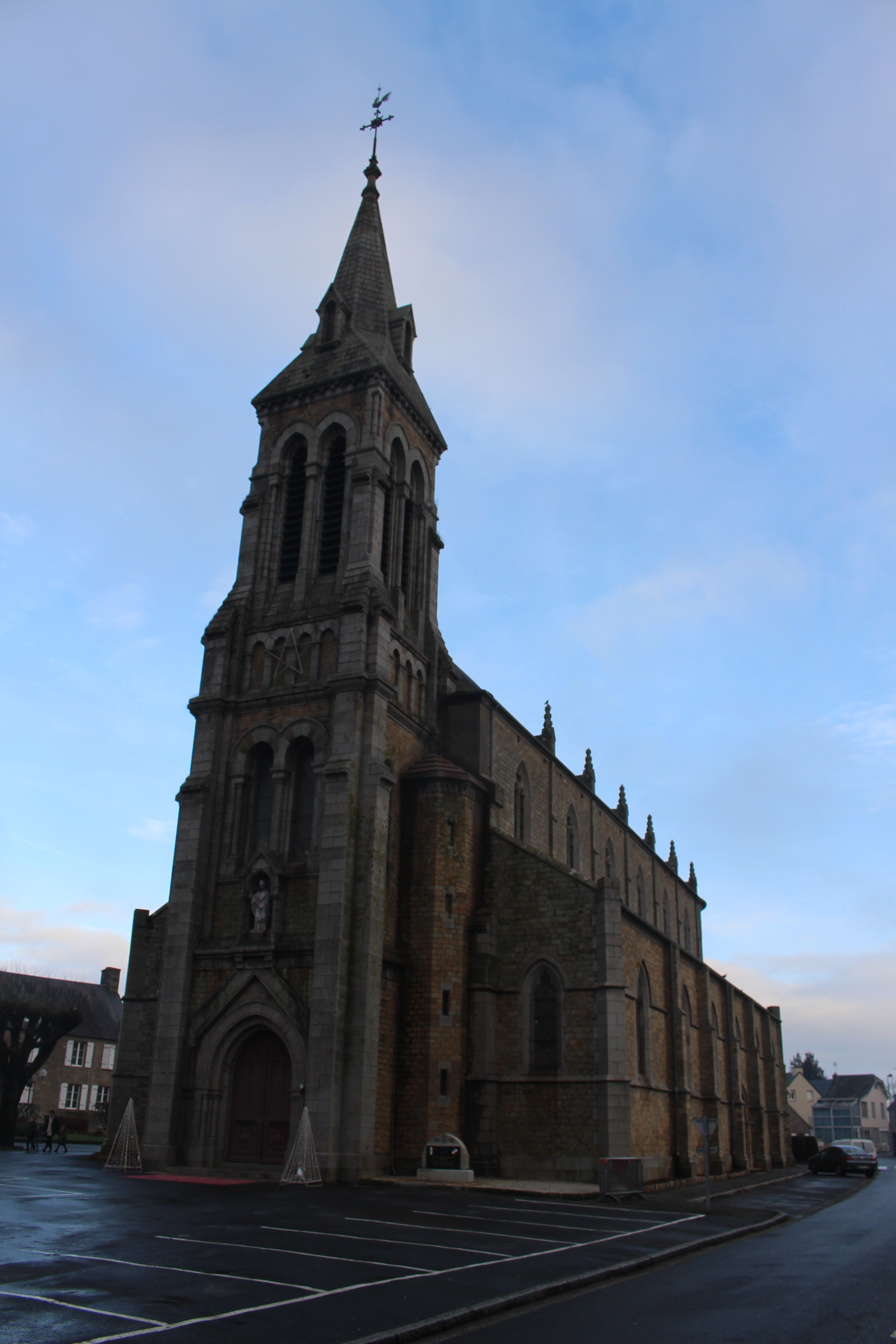
- The church in Sartilly
- Location of Sartilly-Baie-Bocage
- Location within France Location within Normandy
- Coordinates: 48°45′07″N 1°27′18″W
- Country: France
- Region: Normandy
- Department: Manche
- Arrondissement: Avranches
- Canton: Avranches
- Intercommunality: CA Mont-Saint-Michel-Normandie

Government
  - Mayor (2020–2026): Gaëtan Lambert
- Area^{1}: 30.68 km^{2} (11.85 sq mi)
- Population (2023): 2,778
  - Density: 90.55/km^{2} (234.5/sq mi)
- Time zone: UTC+01:00 (CET)
  - Summer (DST): UTC+02:00 (CEST)
- INSEE/Postal code: 50565 /50530
- ^{1} French Land Register data, which excludes lakes, ponds, glaciers > 1 km^{2} (0.386 sq mi or 247 acres) and river estuaries.

Sartilly-Baie-Bocage (French pronunciation: [saʁtiji bɛ bɔkaʒ]) is a commune in the department of Manche, northwestern France. The municipality was established on 1 January 2016 by merger of the former communes of Angey, Champcey, Montviron, La Rochelle-Normande and Sartilly (the seat).

== Population ==
Population data refer to the area corresponding with the commune as of January 2025.

Historical population
Year	Pop.	±% p.a.
1968	1,927	—
1975	1,864	−0.47%
1982	1,889	+0.19%
1990	1,916	+0.18%
1999	2,067	+0.85%
2007	2,375	+1.75%
2012	2,723	+2.77%
2017	2,812	+0.65%
2023	2,778	−0.20%
Source: INSEE

== See also ==
- Communes of the Manche department
