= Champeaux, Manche =

Champeaux
- Commune
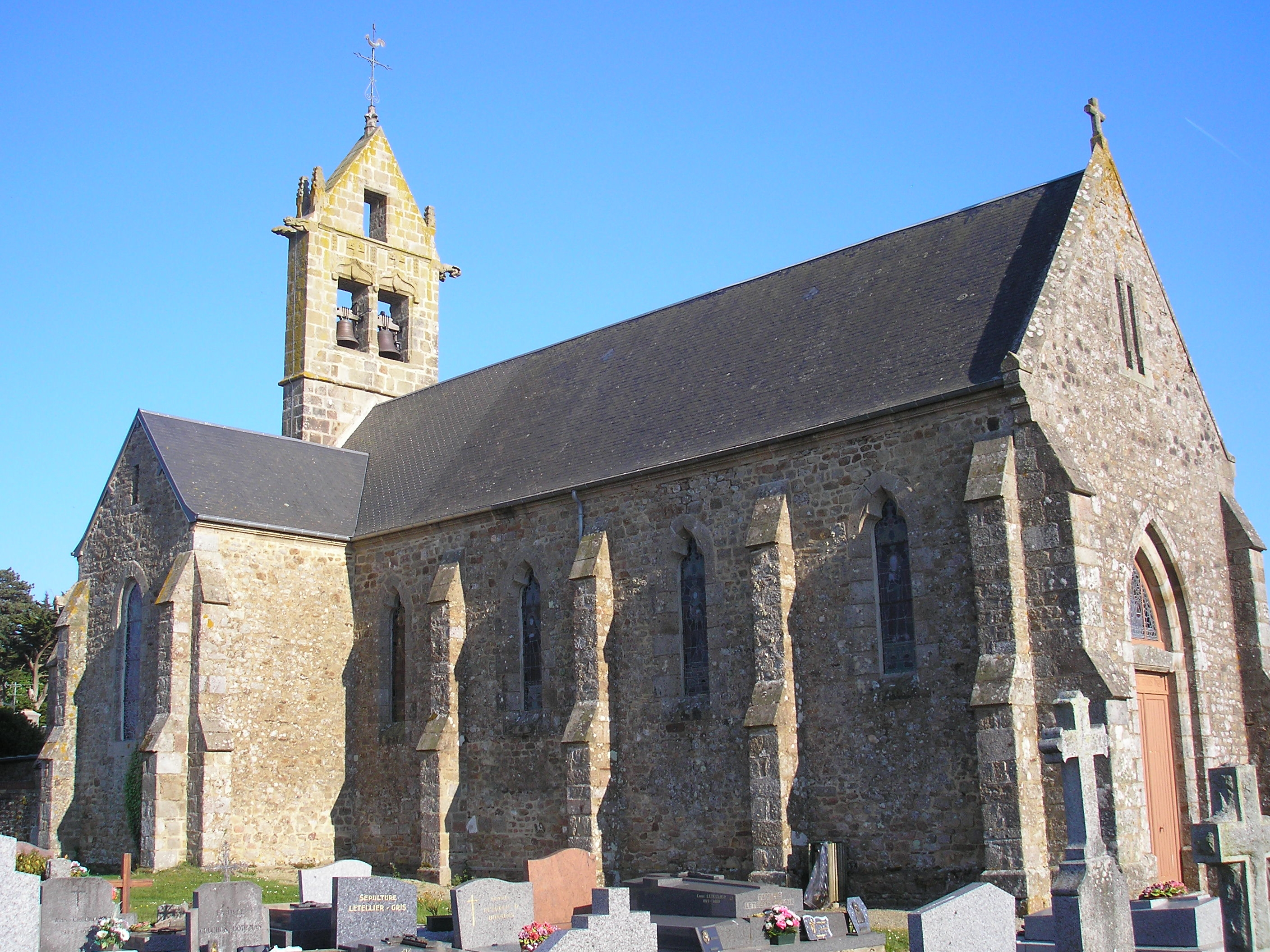
- The church of Saint-Vigor
- Location of Champeaux
- Location within France Location within Normandy
- Coordinates: 48°44′22″N 1°31′39″W
- Country: France
- Region: Normandy
- Department: Manche
- Arrondissement: Avranches
- Canton: Avranches
- Intercommunality: Granville, Terre et Mer

Government
  - Mayor (2020–2026): Sophie Julien-Farcis
- Area^{1}: 4.29 km^{2} (1.66 sq mi)
- Elevation: 80 m (260 ft)
- Highest elevation: 103 m (338 ft)
- Lowest elevation: 0 m (0 ft)
- Population (2023): 349
  - Density: 81.4/km^{2} (211/sq mi)
- Time zone: UTC+01:00 (CET)
  - Summer (DST): UTC+02:00 (CEST)
- INSEE/Postal code: 50117 /50530
- ^{1} French Land Register data, which excludes lakes, ponds, glaciers > 1 km^{2} (0.386 sq mi or 247 acres) and river estuaries.

Champeaux (French pronunciation: [ʃɑ̃po]) is a commune in the Manche department in Normandy in north-western France.

== See also ==
- Communes of the Manche department
