= Dragey-Ronthon =

- Commune
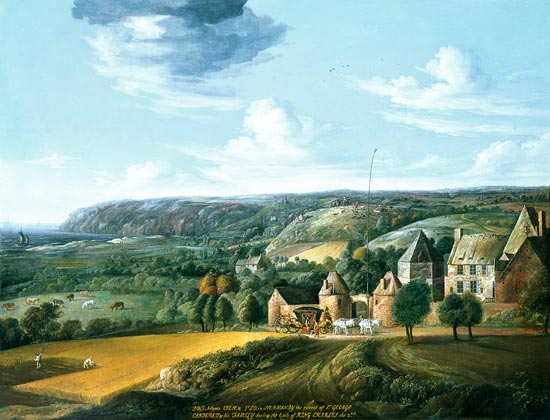
- The Potrel manor house by Jan Griffier, 1650
- Location of Dragey-Ronthon
- Location within France Location within Normandy
- Coordinates: 48°42′45″N 1°29′46″W
- Country: France
- Region: Normandy
- Department: Manche
- Arrondissement: Avranches
- Canton: Avranches
- Intercommunality: CA Mont-Saint-Michel-Normandie

Government
  - Mayor (2020–2026): David Guerlavais
- Area^{1}: 15.17 km^{2} (5.86 sq mi)
- Elevation: 40 m (130 ft)
- Highest elevation: 115 m (377 ft)
- Lowest elevation: 6 m (20 ft)
- Population (2023): 785
  - Density: 51.7/km^{2} (134/sq mi)
- Time zone: UTC+01:00 (CET)
  - Summer (DST): UTC+02:00 (CEST)
- INSEE/Postal code: 50167 /50530
- ^{1} French Land Register data, which excludes lakes, ponds, glaciers > 1 km^{2} (0.386 sq mi or 247 acres) and river estuaries.

Dragey-Ronthon (French pronunciation: [dʁaʒɛ ʁɔ̃tɔ̃]) is a commune in the Manche department in north-western France.

== See also ==
- Communes of the Manche department
