= Chavoy =

- Commune
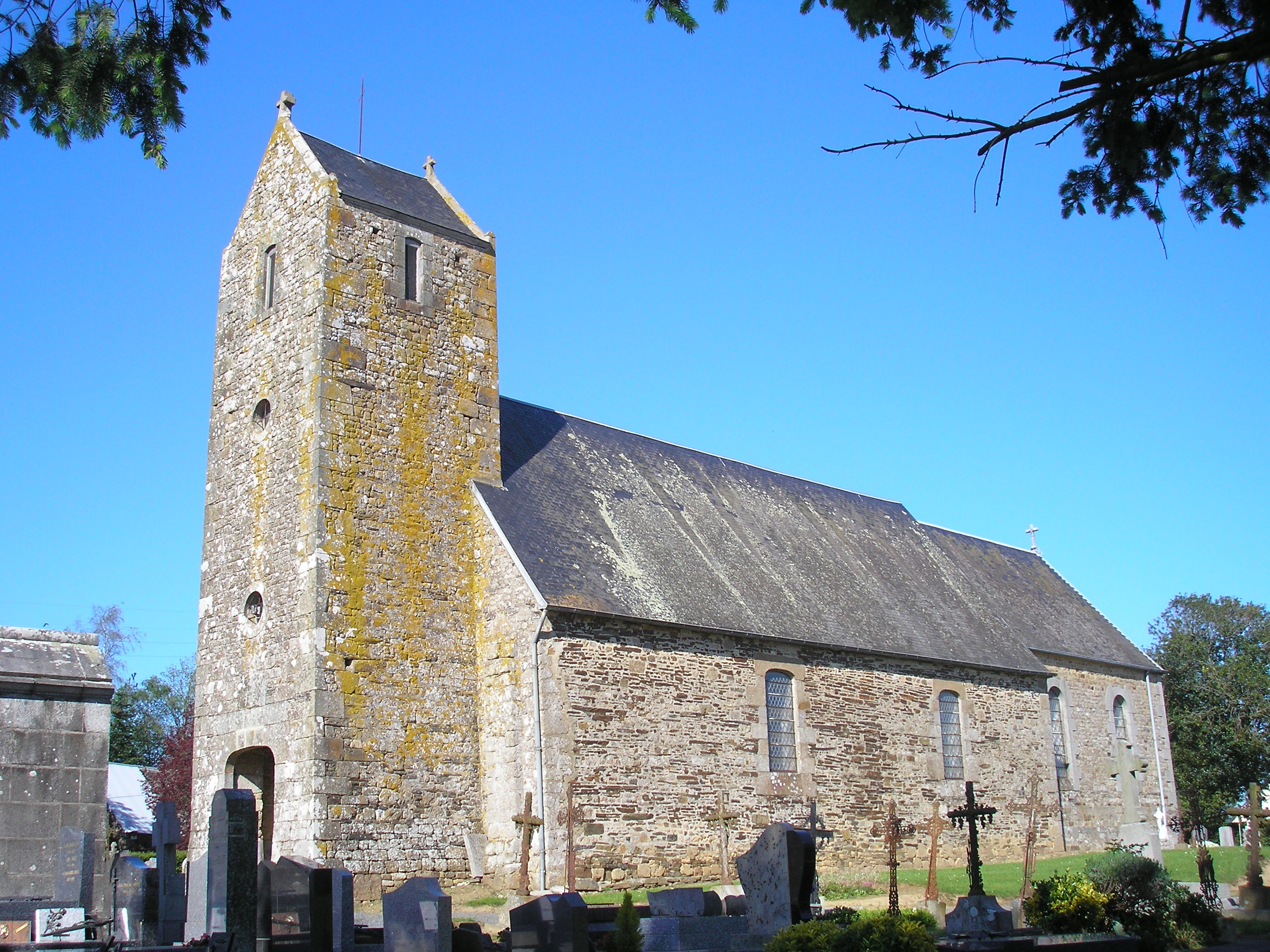
- The church of Notre-Dame
- Location of Chavoy
- Location within France Location within Normandy
- Coordinates: 48°43′41″N 1°19′57″W
- Country: France
- Region: Normandy
- Department: Manche
- Arrondissement: Avranches
- Canton: Avranches
- Intercommunality: CA Mont-Saint-Michel-Normandie

Government
  - Mayor (2020–2026): Valérie Bunel
- Area^{1}: 3.70 km^{2} (1.43 sq mi)
- Elevation: 50 m (160 ft)
- Highest elevation: 127 m (417 ft)
- Lowest elevation: 20 m (66 ft)
- Population (2023): 126
  - Density: 34.1/km^{2} (88.2/sq mi)
- Time zone: UTC+01:00 (CET)
  - Summer (DST): UTC+02:00 (CEST)
- INSEE/Postal code: 50126 /50870
- ^{1} French Land Register data, which excludes lakes, ponds, glaciers > 1 km^{2} (0.386 sq mi or 247 acres) and river estuaries.

Chavoy (French pronunciation: [ʃavwa]) is a commune in the Manche department in Normandy in north-western France.

== See also ==
- Communes of the Manche department
