= Marcey-les-Grèves =

- Commune
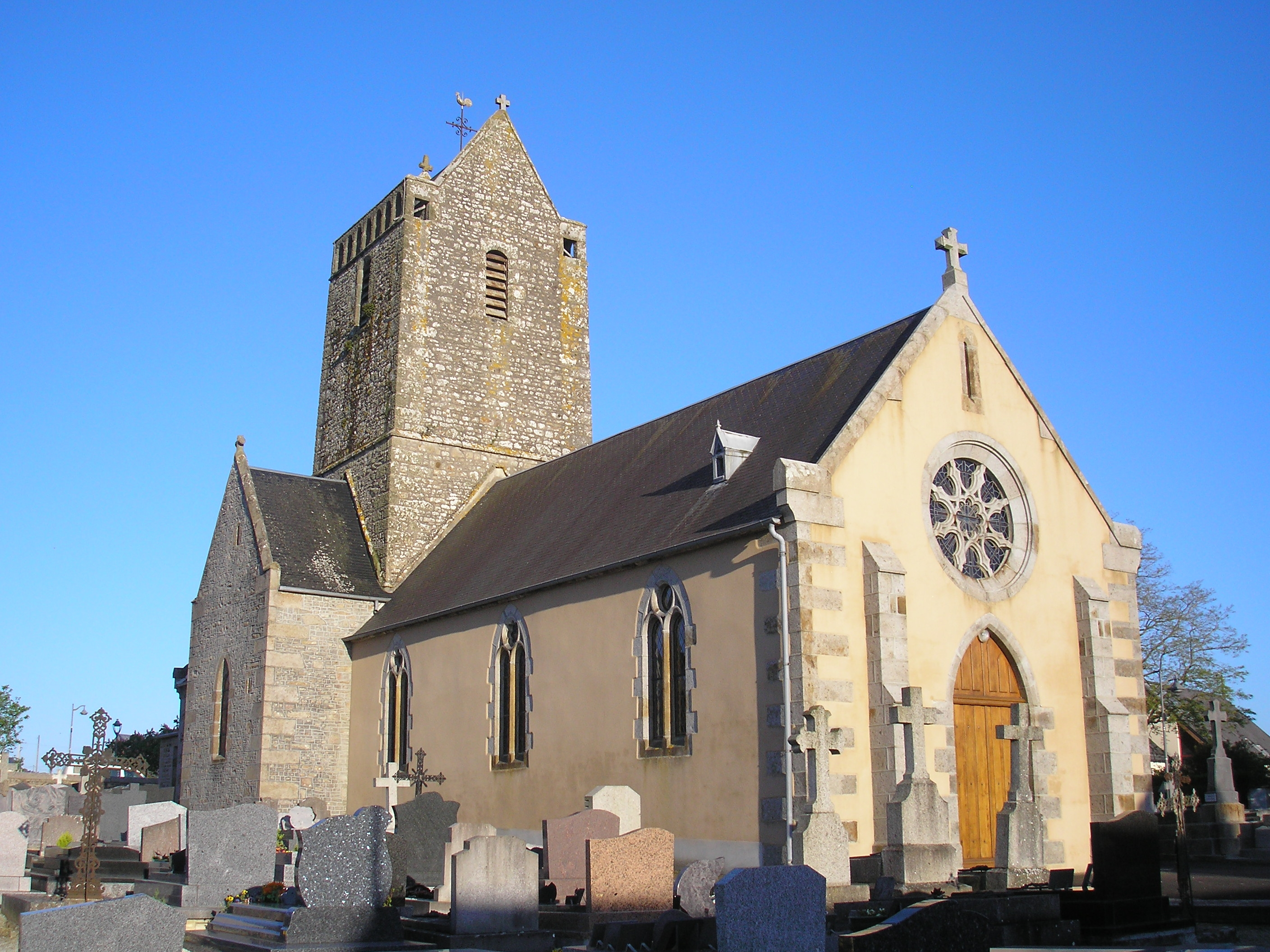
- The church of Saint-Pair
- Location of Marcey-les-Grèves
- Location within France Location within Normandy
- Coordinates: 48°41′51″N 1°23′24″W
- Country: France
- Region: Normandy
- Department: Manche
- Arrondissement: Avranches
- Canton: Avranches
- Intercommunality: CA Mont-Saint-Michel-Normandie

Government
  - Mayor (2020–2026): Élise Roussel
- Area^{1}: 6.73 km^{2} (2.60 sq mi)
- Highest elevation: 46 m (151 ft)
- Lowest elevation: 6 m (20 ft)
- Population (2023): 1,275
  - Density: 189/km^{2} (491/sq mi)
- Time zone: UTC+01:00 (CET)
  - Summer (DST): UTC+02:00 (CEST)
- INSEE/Postal code: 50288 /50300
- ^{1} French Land Register data, which excludes lakes, ponds, glaciers > 1 km^{2} (0.386 sq mi or 247 acres) and river estuaries.

Marcey-les-Grèves (French pronunciation: [maʁsɛ le ɡʁɛv]) is a commune in the Manche department in Normandy in north-western France.

== See also ==
- Communes of the Manche department
