= Saint-Jean-le-Thomas =

- Commune
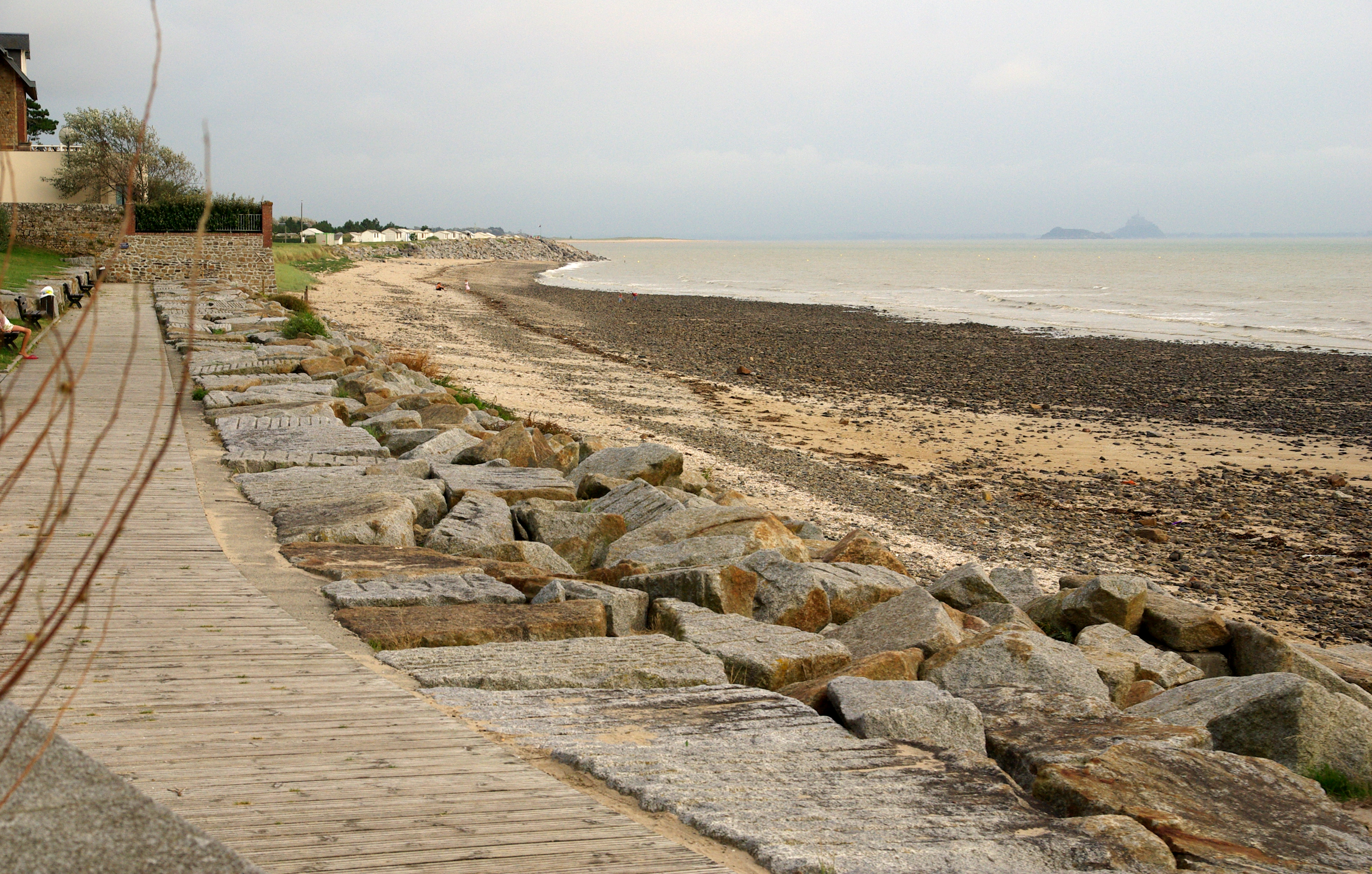
- The coast of Saint-Jean-le-Thomas with views of Mont Saint-Michel and the rock of Tombelaine in the evening mist

- Coat of arms
- Location of Saint-Jean-le-Thomas
- Location within France Location within Normandy
- Coordinates: 48°43′51″N 1°30′56″W
- Country: France
- Region: Normandy
- Department: Manche
- Arrondissement: Avranches
- Canton: Avranches
- Intercommunality: CA Mont-Saint-Michel-Normandie

Government
  - Mayor (2020–2026): Alain Bachelier
- Area^{1}: 2.38 km^{2} (0.92 sq mi)
- Elevation: 40 m (130 ft)
- Highest elevation: 90 m (300 ft)
- Lowest elevation: 5 m (16 ft)
- Population (2023): 401
  - Density: 168/km^{2} (436/sq mi)
- Time zone: UTC+01:00 (CET)
  - Summer (DST): UTC+02:00 (CEST)
- INSEE/Postal code: 50496 /50530
- ^{1} French Land Register data, which excludes lakes, ponds, glaciers > 1 km^{2} (0.386 sq mi or 247 acres) and river estuaries.

Saint-Jean-le-Thomas (French pronunciation: [sɛ̃ ʒɑ̃ lə tɔmɑ]) is a commune in the Manche department in Normandy in north-western France.

It is a small beach town located on Normandy, close to "Le Mont Saint Michel"

== See also ==
- Communes of the Manche department
