= Lolif =

- Commune
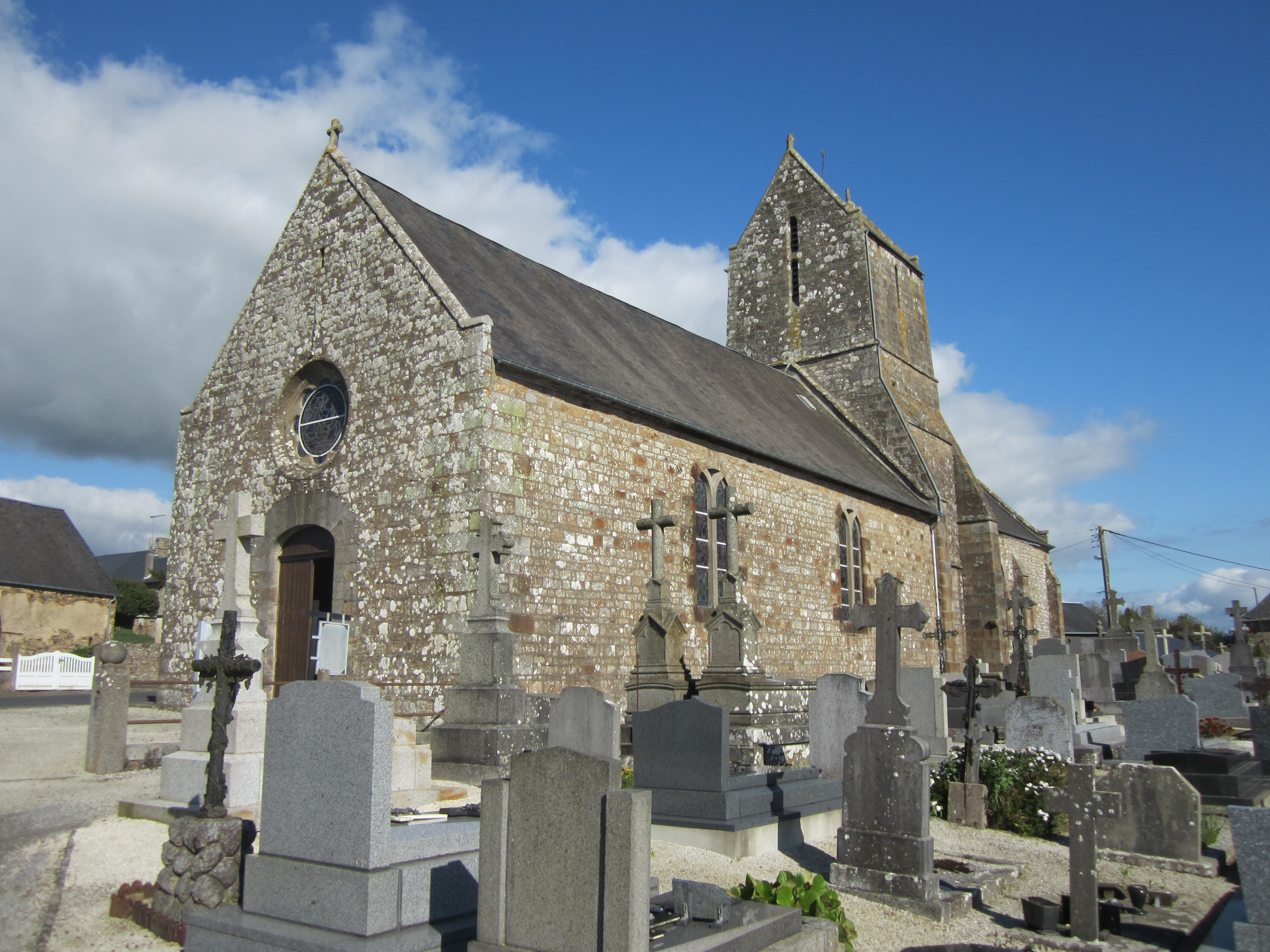
- The church of Saint-Martin
- Location of Lolif
- Location within France Location within Normandy
- Coordinates: 48°44′05″N 1°23′30″W
- Country: France
- Region: Normandy
- Department: Manche
- Arrondissement: Avranches
- Canton: Avranches
- Intercommunality: CA Mont-Saint-Michel-Normandie

Government
  - Mayor (2020–2026): Michel Rault
- Area^{1}: 12.5 km^{2} (4.8 sq mi)
- Elevation: 112 m (367 ft)
- Highest elevation: 120 m (390 ft)
- Lowest elevation: 9 m (30 ft)
- Population (2023): 604
  - Density: 48.3/km^{2} (125/sq mi)
- Time zone: UTC+01:00 (CET)
  - Summer (DST): UTC+02:00 (CEST)
- INSEE/Postal code: 50276 /50530
- ^{1} French Land Register data, which excludes lakes, ponds, glaciers > 1 km^{2} (0.386 sq mi or 247 acres) and river estuaries.

Lolif (French pronunciation: [lɔlif]) is a commune in the Manche department in Normandy in northwestern France.

== See also ==
- Communes of the Manche department
