= Vains =

- Commune
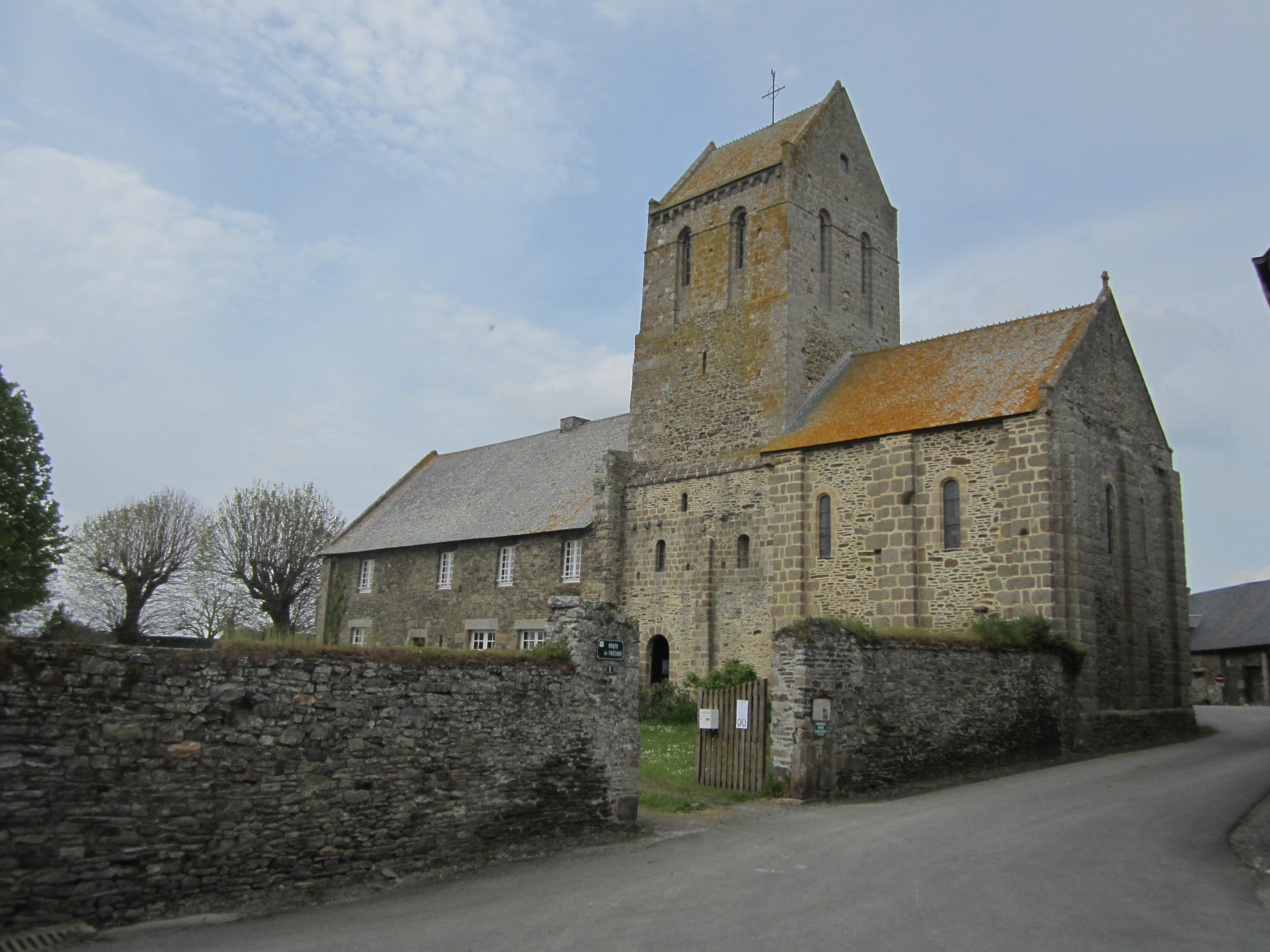
- The priory of Saint-Léonard
- Location of Vains
- Location within France Location within Normandy
- Coordinates: 48°40′57″N 1°24′39″W
- Country: France
- Region: Normandy
- Department: Manche
- Arrondissement: Avranches
- Canton: Avranches
- Intercommunality: CA Mont-Saint-Michel-Normandie

Government
  - Mayor (2020–2026): Olivier Deville
- Area^{1}: 8.58 km^{2} (3.31 sq mi)
- Highest elevation: 39 m (128 ft)
- Lowest elevation: 5 m (16 ft)
- Population (2023): 743
  - Density: 86.6/km^{2} (224/sq mi)
- Time zone: UTC+01:00 (CET)
  - Summer (DST): UTC+02:00 (CEST)
- INSEE/Postal code: 50612 /50300
- ^{1} French Land Register data, which excludes lakes, ponds, glaciers > 1 km^{2} (0.386 sq mi or 247 acres) and river estuaries.

Vains is a commune in the Manche department in Normandy in north-western France.

== See also ==
- Communes of the Manche department
