= Carolles =

- Commune
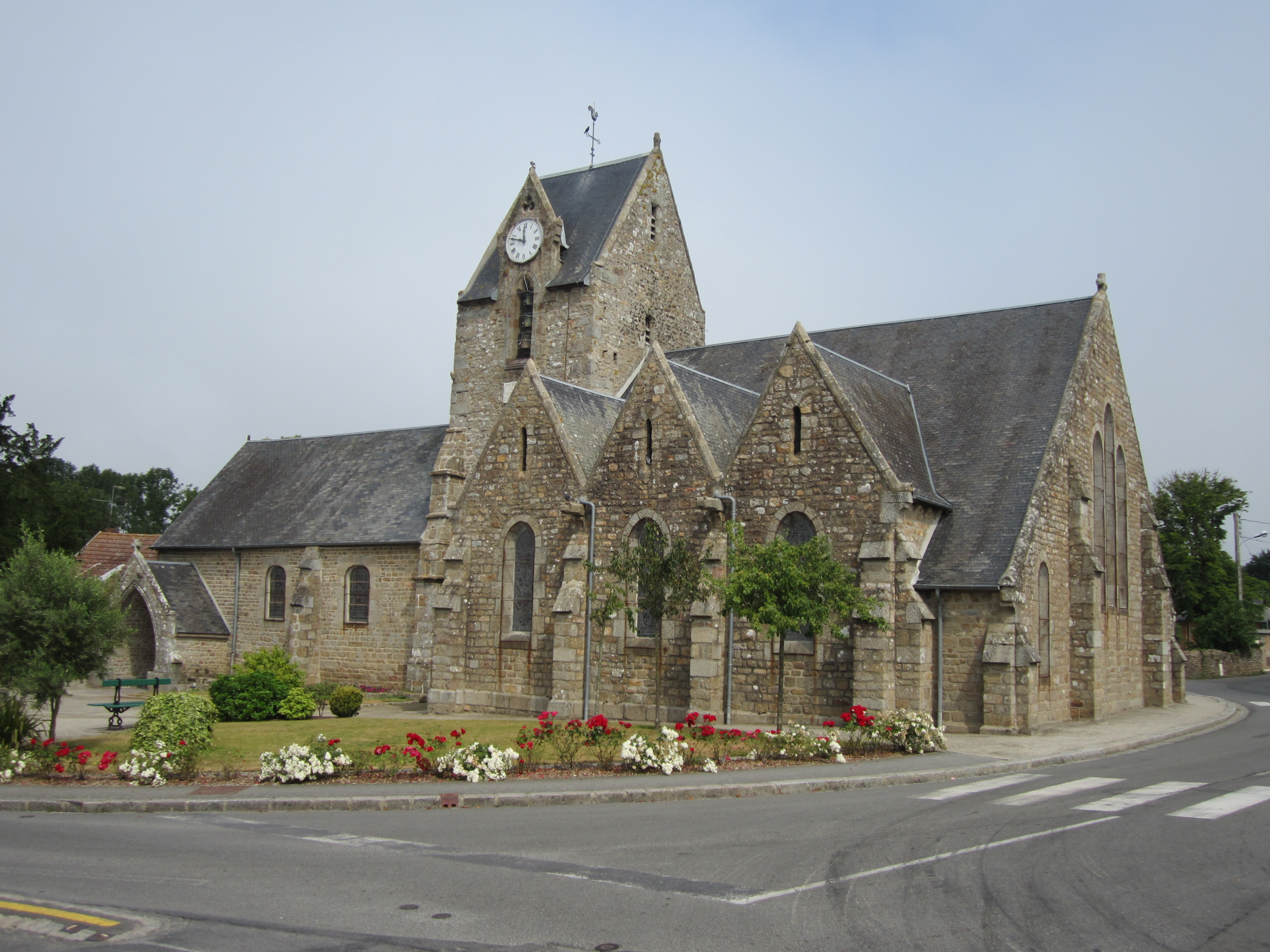
- The church of Saint-Vigor

- Coat of arms
- Location of Carolles
- Location within France Location within Normandy
- Coordinates: 48°45′05″N 1°33′29″W
- Country: France
- Region: Normandy
- Department: Manche
- Arrondissement: Avranches
- Canton: Avranches
- Intercommunality: Granville, Terre et Mer

Government
  - Mayor (2020–2026): Miloud Mansour
- Area^{1}: 3.85 km^{2} (1.49 sq mi)
- Highest elevation: 77 m (253 ft)
- Lowest elevation: 0 m (0 ft)
- Population (2023): 774
  - Density: 201/km^{2} (521/sq mi)
- Time zone: UTC+01:00 (CET)
  - Summer (DST): UTC+02:00 (CEST)
- INSEE/Postal code: 50102 /50740
- ^{1} French Land Register data, which excludes lakes, ponds, glaciers > 1 km^{2} (0.386 sq mi or 247 acres) and river estuaries.

Carolles (French pronunciation: [kaʁɔl]) is a commune in the Manche department in Normandy in north-western France.

== Heraldry ==
Arms of Carolles	The arms of Carolles are blazoned : Azure, a ship equipped on waves argent, on a chief gules a leopard Or.

== See also ==
- Communes of the Manche department
