= Canton of Avranches =

Coordinates: 48.68°N 1.36°W

The canton of Avranches is an administrative division of the Manche department, northwestern France. Its borders were modified at the French canton reorganisation which came into effect in March 2015. Its seat is in Avranches.

It consists of the following communes:

1. Avranches (partly)
2. Bacilly
3. Carolles
4. Champeaux
5. Chavoy
6. Dragey-Ronthon
7. Genêts
8. Jullouville
9. Lolif
10. Marcey-les-Grèves
11. Le Parc
12. Ponts
13. Saint-Jean-de-la-Haize
14. Saint-Jean-le-Thomas
15. Saint-Pierre-Langers
16. Sartilly-Baie-Bocage
17. Vains
