= Saint-Brice =

Saint-Brice is the name or part of the name of several communes in France, originally dedicated to Bricius of Tours, the canonised fourth-century bishop of Tours:

- Saint-Brice, Charente, in the Charente département
- Saint-Brice, Gironde, in the Gironde département
- Saint-Brice, Manche, in the Manche département
- Saint-Brice, Mayenne, in the Mayenne département
- Saint-Brice, Orne, in the Orne département
- Saint-Brice, Seine-et-Marne, in the Seine-et-Marne département
- Saint-Brice-Courcelles, in the Marne département
- Saint-Brice-de-Landelles, in the Manche département
- Saint-Brice-en-Coglès, in the Ille-et-Vilaine département
- Saint-Brice-sous-Forêt, in the Val-d'Oise département
- Saint-Brice-sous-Rânes, in the Orne département
- Saint-Brice-sur-Vienne, in the Haute-Vienne département
