= Chèvreville =

Chèvreville may refer to the following communes in France:

- Chèvreville, Manche
- Chèvreville, Oise
