= Parigny =

Parigny may refer to the following places in France:

- Parigny, Loire, a commune in the Loire department
- Parigny, Manche, a commune in the Manche department
