= Saint-Symphorien-des-Monts =

- Part of Buais-les-Monts
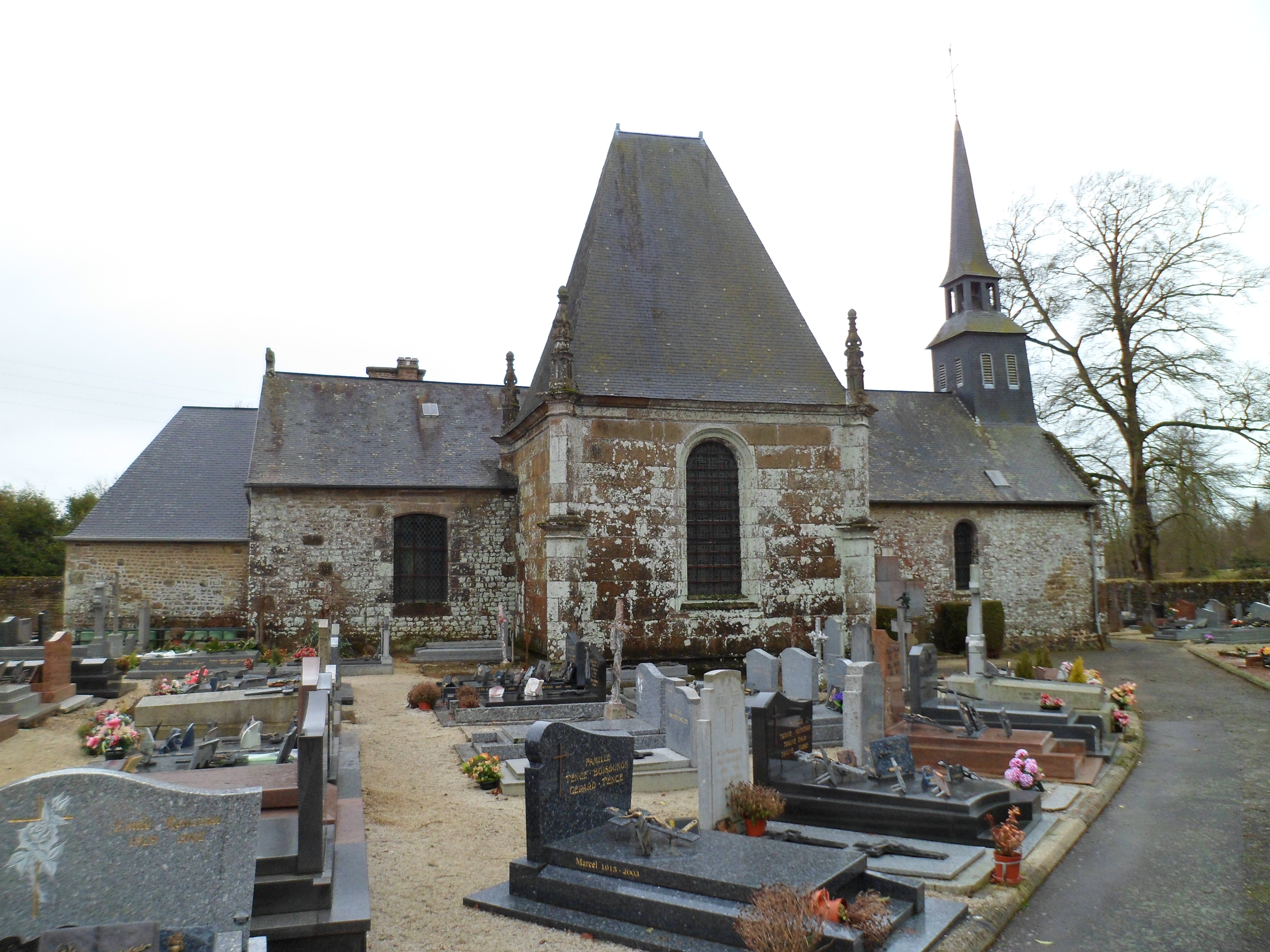
- The church of Saint-Symphorien
- Location of Saint-Symphorien-des-Monts
- Location within France Location within Normandy
- Coordinates: 48°32′39″N 1°00′05″W
- Country: France
- Region: Normandy
- Department: Manche
- Arrondissement: Avranches
- Canton: Saint-Hilaire-du-Harcouët
- Commune: Buais-les-Monts
- Area^{1}: 6.81 km^{2} (2.63 sq mi)
- Elevation: 204 m (669 ft)
- Highest elevation: 222 m (728 ft)
- Lowest elevation: 117 m (384 ft)
- Population (2022): 124
  - Density: 18.2/km^{2} (47.2/sq mi)
- Time zone: UTC+01:00 (CET)
  - Summer (DST): UTC+02:00 (CEST)
- Postal code: 50640
- ^{1} French Land Register data, which excludes lakes, ponds, glaciers > 1 km^{2} (0.386 sq mi or 247 acres) and river estuaries.

Saint-Symphorien-des-Monts (French pronunciation: [sɛ̃ sɛ̃fɔʁjɛ̃ de mɔ̃]) is a former commune in the Manche department in Normandy in north-western France. On 1 January 2016, it was merged into the new commune of Buais-les-Monts. Its population was 124 in 2022.

== See also ==
- Communes of the Manche department
