= Buais =

Commune in Manche, France

- Part of Buais-les-Monts
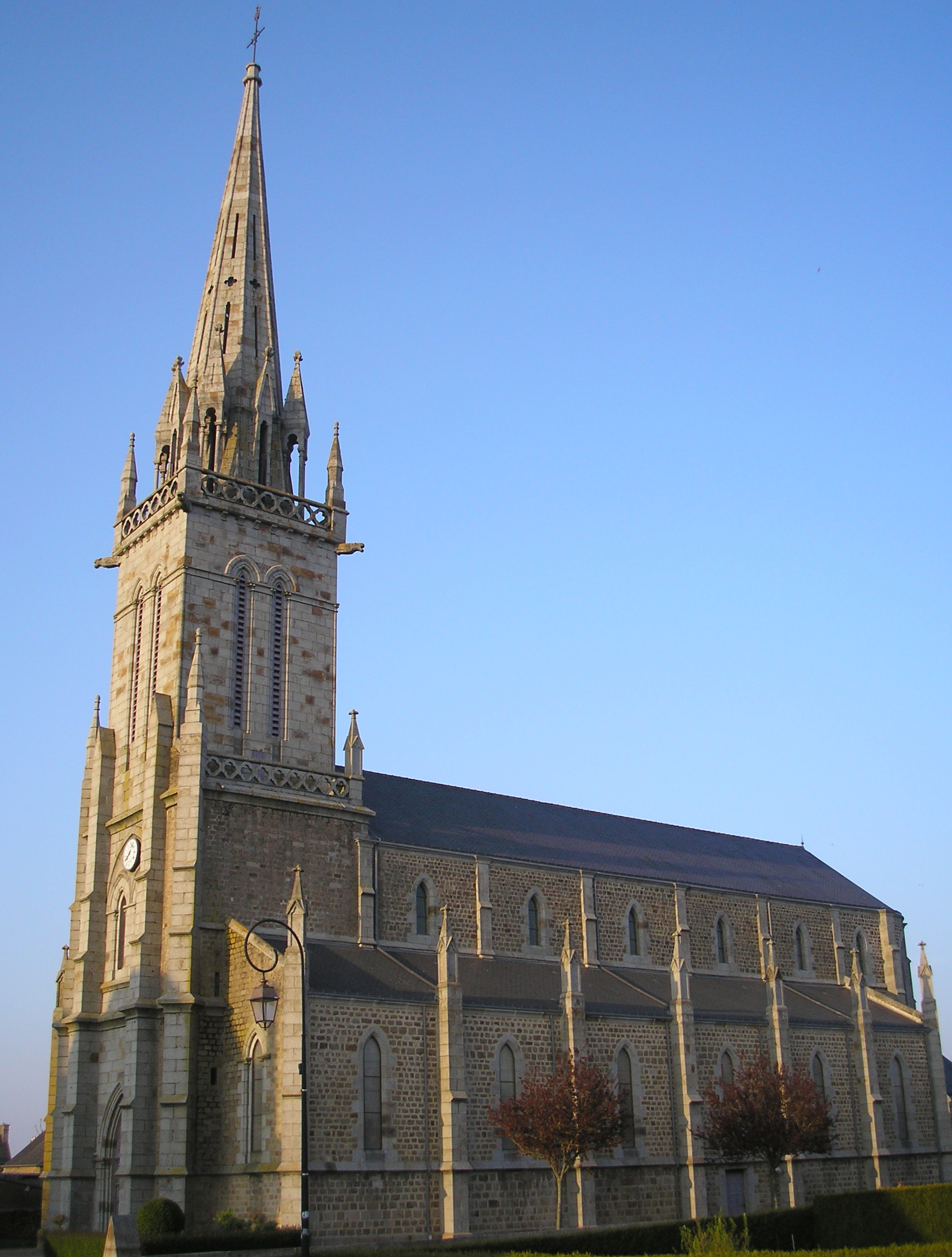
- The church of Sainte-Anne
- Location of Buais
- Location within France Location within Normandy
- Coordinates: 48°31′23″N 0°58′04″W
- Country: France
- Region: Normandy
- Department: Manche
- Arrondissement: Avranches
- Canton: Saint-Hilaire-du-Harcouët
- Commune: Buais-les-Monts
- Area^{1}: 17.92 km^{2} (6.92 sq mi)
- Elevation: 216 m (709 ft)
- Highest elevation: 238 m (781 ft)
- Lowest elevation: 115 m (377 ft)
- Population (2023): 489
  - Density: 27.3/km^{2} (70.7/sq mi)
- Time zone: UTC+01:00 (CET)
  - Summer (DST): UTC+02:00 (CEST)
- Postal code: 50640
- ^{1} French Land Register data, which excludes lakes, ponds, glaciers > 1 km^{2} (0.386 sq mi or 247 acres) and river estuaries.

Buais (French pronunciation: [bɥɛ]) is a former commune in the Manche department in Normandy in northwestern France. On 1 January 2016, it was merged into the new commune of Buais-les-Monts.

== Location ==
Buais is a small village southeast of Saint-Hilaire-du-Harcouët.

== Amenities ==
The village has a bakery, bar/post office, corner shop, hairdresser, taxi office, and veterinarian.

== See also ==
- Communes of the Manche department
