= Martigny (disambiguation) =

Martigny is the capital of the district of Martigny in the canton of Valais in Switzerland formed by the merger of Martigny-Bourg and Martigny-Ville in 1964.

Martigny may also refer to:

== France ==
- Martigny, Aisne, in the Aisne department
- Martigny, Manche, in the Manche department
- Martigny, Seine-Maritime, in the Seine-Maritime department
- Martigny-Courpierre, in the Aisne department
- Martigny-le-Comte, in the Saône-et-Loire department
- Martigny-les-Bains, in the Vosges department
- Martigny-les-Gerbonvaux, in the Vosges department
- Martigny-sur-l'Ante, in the Calvados department
- Saint-Germain-de-Martigny, in the Orne department

== Canada ==
- Martigny River, Québec

== Switzerland ==
- Martigny-Combe, a municipality in the canton of Valais
