= Milly, Manche =

Milly
- Part of Grandparigny
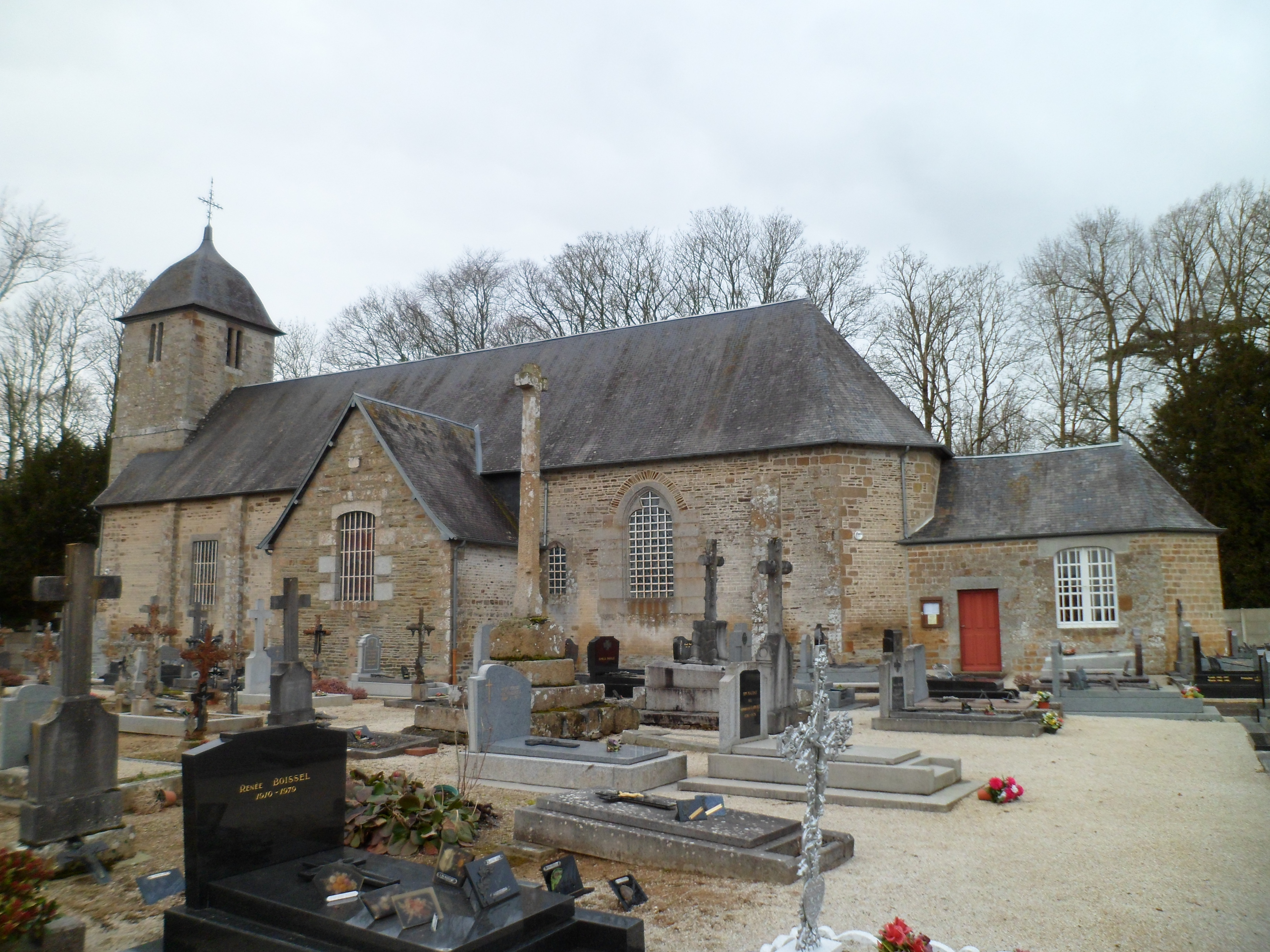
- The church of Saint-Pierre
- Location of Milly
- Location within France Location within Normandy
- Coordinates: 48°36′10″N 1°01′08″W
- Country: France
- Region: Normandy
- Department: Manche
- Arrondissement: Avranches
- Canton: Saint-Hilaire-du-Harcouët
- Commune: Grandparigny
- Area^{1}: 9.65 km^{2} (3.73 sq mi)
- Elevation: 103 m (338 ft)
- Highest elevation: 128 m (420 ft)
- Lowest elevation: 65 m (213 ft)
- Population (2022): 326
  - Density: 33.8/km^{2} (87.5/sq mi)
- Time zone: UTC+01:00 (CET)
  - Summer (DST): UTC+02:00 (CEST)
- Postal code: 50600
- ^{1} French Land Register data, which excludes lakes, ponds, glaciers > 1 km^{2} (0.386 sq mi or 247 acres) and river estuaries.

Milly (French pronunciation: [miji]) is a former commune in the Manche department in Normandy in north-western France. On 1 January 2016, it was merged into the new commune of Grandparigny. Its population was 326 in 2022.

== See also ==
- Communes of the Manche department
