= Saint-Aubin-de-Terregatte =

- Commune
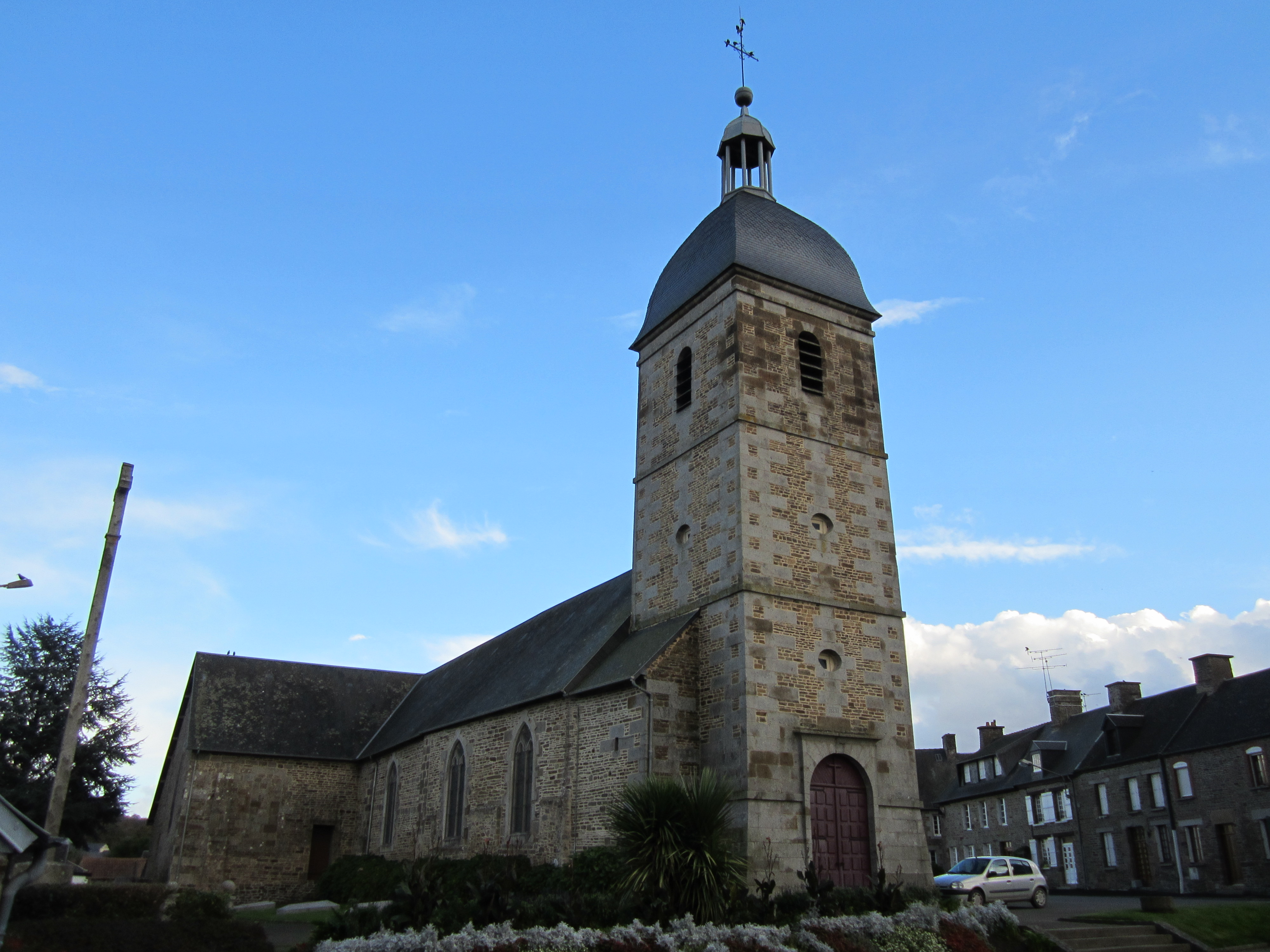
- Saint-Aubin church
- Location of Saint-Aubin-de-Terregatte
- Location within France Location within Normandy
- Coordinates: 48°34′36″N 1°17′54″W
- Country: France
- Region: Normandy
- Department: Manche
- Arrondissement: Avranches
- Canton: Saint-Hilaire-du-Harcouët
- Intercommunality: CA Mont-Saint-Michel-Normandie

Government
  - Mayor (2020–2026): Christian Morel
- Area^{1}: 20.96 km^{2} (8.09 sq mi)
- Elevation: 75 m (246 ft)
- Highest elevation: 181 m (594 ft)
- Lowest elevation: 12 m (39 ft)
- Population (2023): 645
  - Density: 30.8/km^{2} (79.7/sq mi)
- Time zone: UTC+01:00 (CET)
  - Summer (DST): UTC+02:00 (CEST)
- INSEE/Postal code: 50448 /50240
- ^{1} French Land Register data, which excludes lakes, ponds, glaciers > 1 km^{2} (0.386 sq mi or 247 acres) and river estuaries.

Saint-Aubin-de-Terregatte (French pronunciation: [sɛ̃.t‿obɛ̃ də tɛʁɡat]) is a commune in the Manche department in Normandy in north-western France.

== See also ==
- Communes of the Manche department
