= Buais-les-Monts =

- Commune
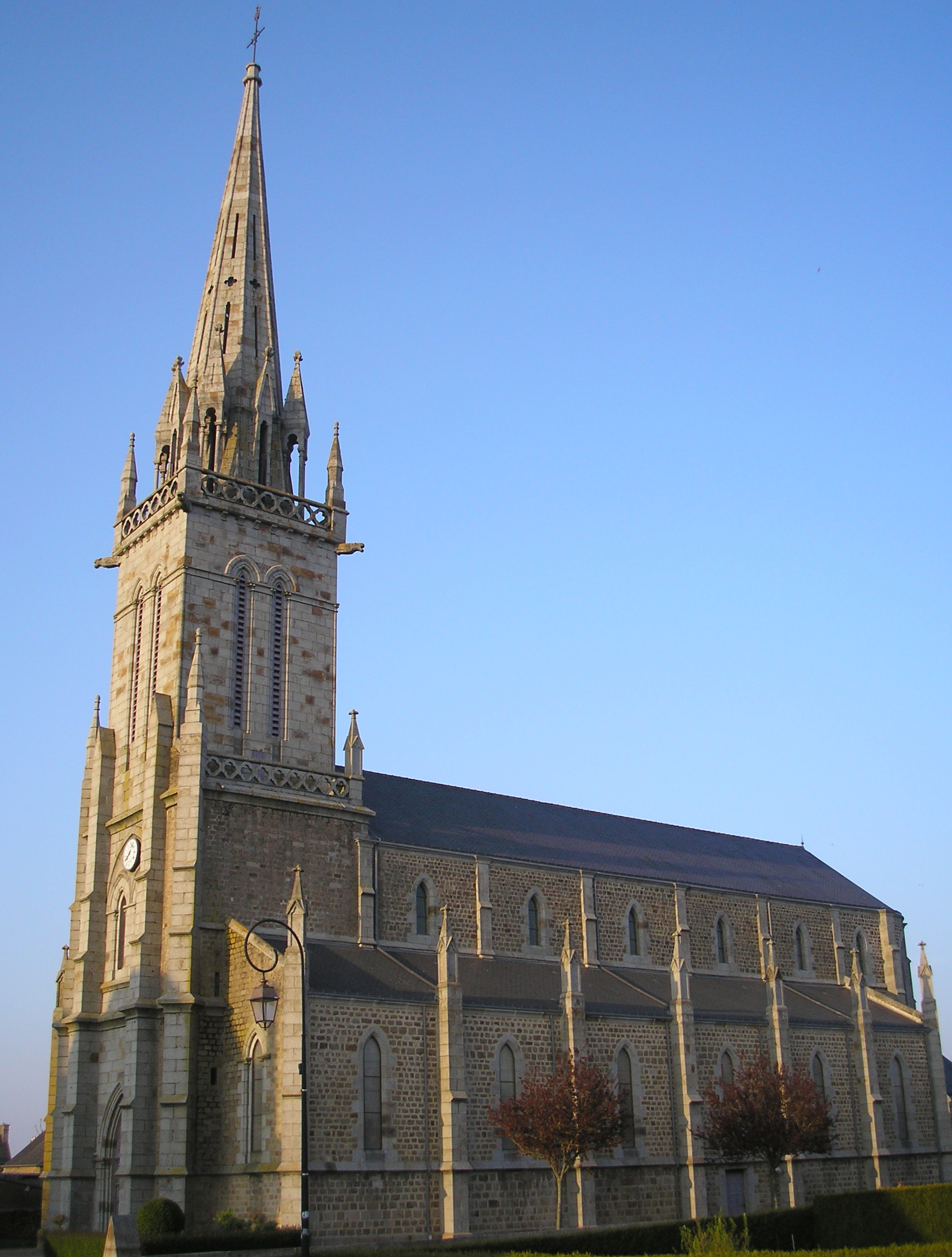
- The church in Buais-les-Monts
- Location of Buais-les-Monts
- Location within France Location within Normandy
- Coordinates: 48°31′19″N 0°58′08″W
- Country: France
- Region: Normandy
- Department: Manche
- Arrondissement: Avranches
- Canton: Saint-Hilaire-du-Harcouët
- Intercommunality: CA Mont-Saint-Michel-Normandie

Government
  - Mayor (2020–2026): Éric Courteille
- Area^{1}: 24.73 km^{2} (9.55 sq mi)
- Population (2023): 611
  - Density: 24.7/km^{2} (64.0/sq mi)
- Time zone: UTC+01:00 (CET)
  - Summer (DST): UTC+02:00 (CEST)
- INSEE/Postal code: 50090 /50640
- ^{1} French Land Register data, which excludes lakes, ponds, glaciers > 1 km^{2} (0.386 sq mi or 247 acres) and river estuaries.

Buais-les-Monts (French pronunciation: [bɥɛ le mɔ̃]) is a commune in the department of Manche, northwestern France. The municipality was established on 1 January 2016 by merger of the former communes of Buais and Saint-Symphorien-des-Monts.

== See also ==
- Communes of the Manche department
