= Les Loges-Marchis =

- Commune
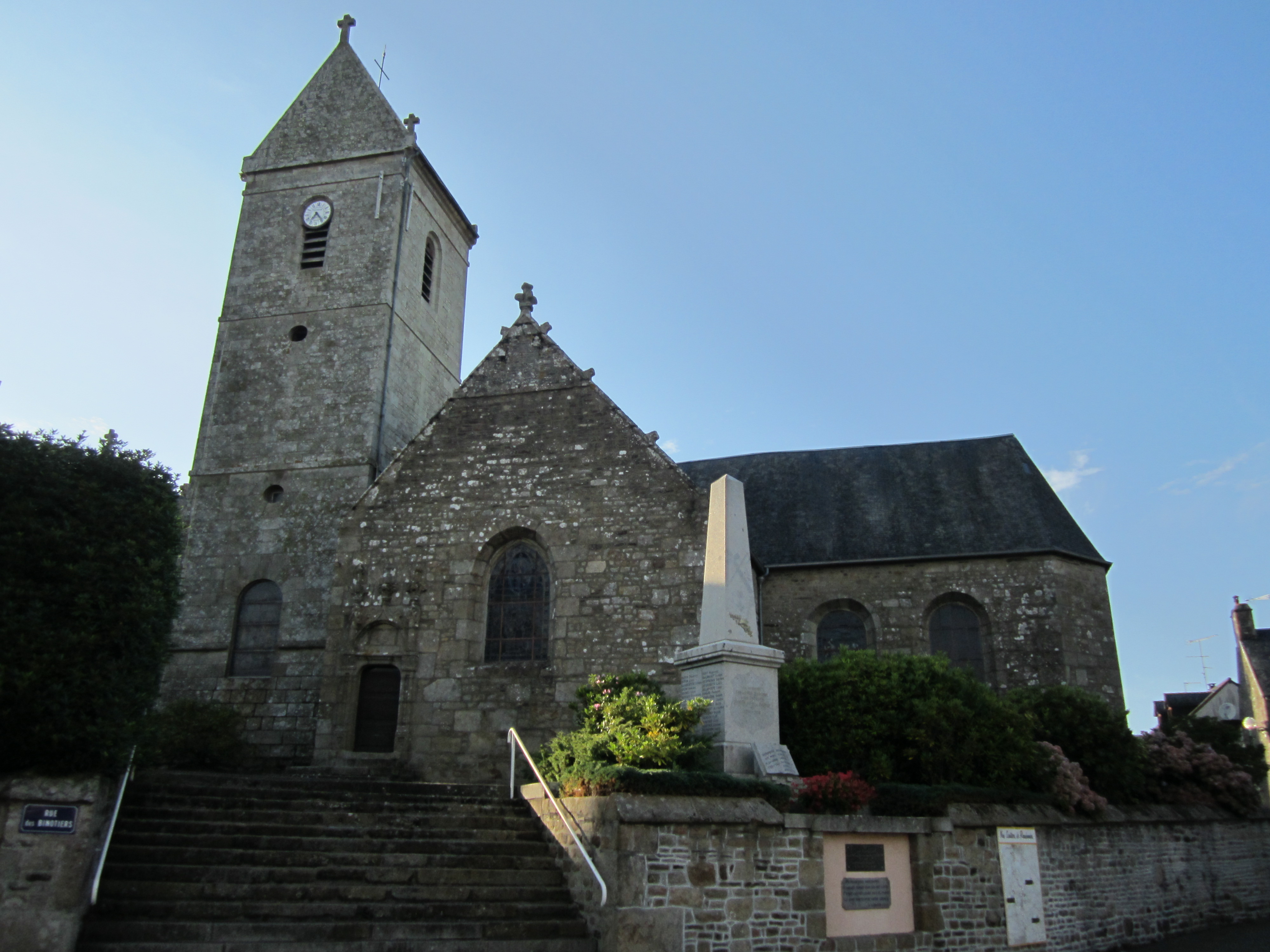
- The church of Saint-Pierre-et-Saint-Paul
- Location of Les Loges-Marchis
- Location within France Location within Normandy
- Coordinates: 48°32′34″N 1°05′13″W
- Country: France
- Region: Normandy
- Department: Manche
- Arrondissement: Avranches
- Canton: Saint-Hilaire-du-Harcouët
- Intercommunality: CA Mont-Saint-Michel-Normandie

Government
  - Mayor (2020–2026): Paulette Matéo
- Area^{1}: 19.78 km^{2} (7.64 sq mi)
- Elevation: 175 m (574 ft)
- Highest elevation: 208 m (682 ft)
- Lowest elevation: 69 m (226 ft)
- Population (2023): 1,051
  - Density: 53.13/km^{2} (137.6/sq mi)
- Time zone: UTC+01:00 (CET)
  - Summer (DST): UTC+02:00 (CEST)
- INSEE/Postal code: 50274 /50600
- ^{1} French Land Register data, which excludes lakes, ponds, glaciers > 1 km^{2} (0.386 sq mi or 247 acres) and river estuaries.

Les Loges-Marchis (French pronunciation: [le lɔʒ maʁʃi]) is a commune in the Manche department in Normandy in north-western France.

== History ==
The village was badly affected by the French Dysentery Epidemic of 1779 such that 250 died and the graveyard had to be extended this may be the origin of the five crosses (Les Cinq Croix).

== See also ==
- Communes of the Manche department
