= Chèvreville, Manche =

Chèvreville
- Part of Grandparigny
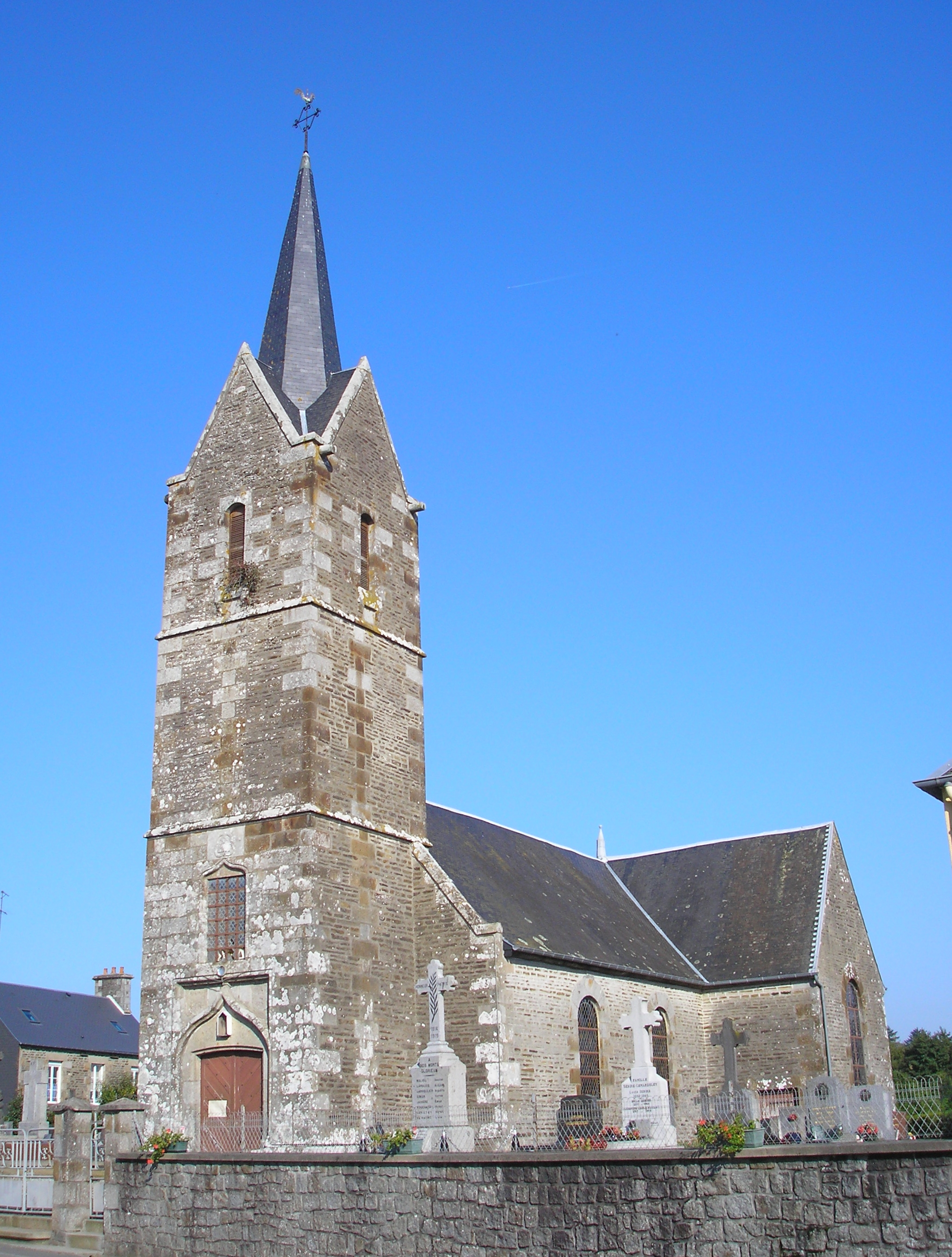
- The church of Notre-Dame
- Location of Chèvreville
- Location within France Location within Normandy
- Coordinates: 48°36′54″N 1°02′45″W
- Country: France
- Region: Normandy
- Department: Manche
- Arrondissement: Avranches
- Canton: Saint-Hilaire-du-Harcouët
- Commune: Grandparigny
- Area^{1}: 4.45 km^{2} (1.72 sq mi)
- Elevation: 90 m (300 ft)
- Highest elevation: 122 m (400 ft)
- Lowest elevation: 71 m (233 ft)
- Population (2022): 193
  - Density: 43.4/km^{2} (112/sq mi)
- Time zone: UTC+01:00 (CET)
  - Summer (DST): UTC+02:00 (CEST)
- Postal code: 50600
- ^{1} French Land Register data, which excludes lakes, ponds, glaciers > 1 km^{2} (0.386 sq mi or 247 acres) and river estuaries.

Chèvreville (French pronunciation: [ʃɛvʁəvil]) is a former commune in the Manche department in Normandy in north-western France. On 1 January 2016, it was merged into the new commune of Grandparigny.

== See also ==
- Communes of the Manche department
