= Montjoie-Saint-Martin =

- Commune
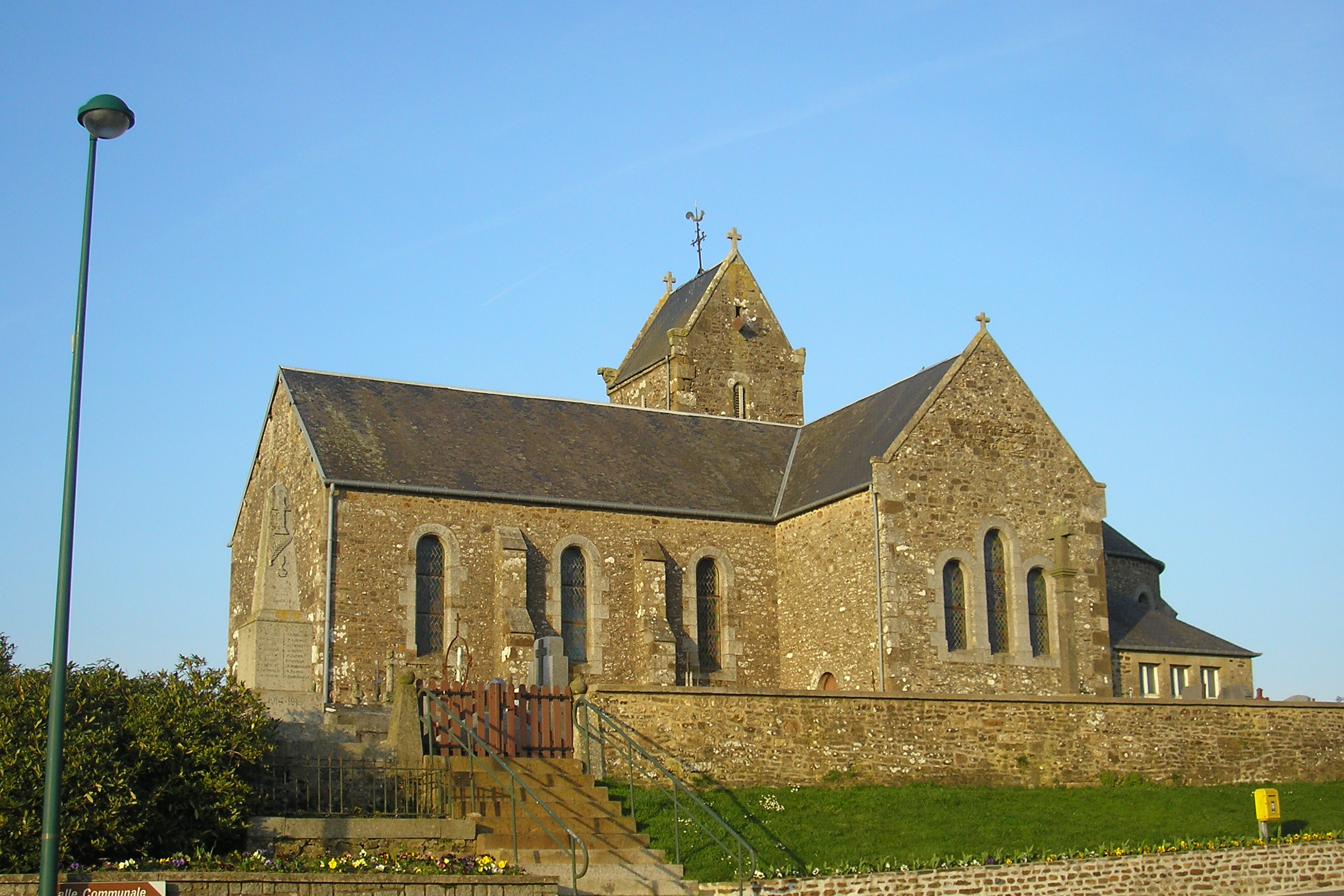
- The church of Saint-Martin
- Location of Montjoie-Saint-Martin
- Location within France Location within Normandy
- Coordinates: 48°31′59″N 1°17′24″W
- Country: France
- Region: Normandy
- Department: Manche
- Arrondissement: Avranches
- Canton: Saint-Hilaire-du-Harcouët
- Intercommunality: CA Mont-Saint-Michel-Normandie

Government
  - Mayor (2020–2026): Maurice Duhamel
- Area^{1}: 7.49 km^{2} (2.89 sq mi)
- Elevation: 168 m (551 ft)
- Highest elevation: 188 m (617 ft)
- Lowest elevation: 75 m (246 ft)
- Population (2023): 250
  - Density: 33/km^{2} (86/sq mi)
- Demonym: Montjoyeux ou Montjoriciens
- Time zone: UTC+01:00 (CET)
  - Summer (DST): UTC+02:00 (CEST)
- INSEE/Postal code: 50347 /50240
- ^{1} French Land Register data, which excludes lakes, ponds, glaciers > 1 km^{2} (0.386 sq mi or 247 acres) and river estuaries.

Montjoie-Saint-Martin (French pronunciation: [mɔ̃ʒwa sɛ̃ maʁtɛ̃]) is a commune in the Manche department in Normandy in north-western France.

== See also ==
- Communes of the Manche department
