= Hamelin, Manche =

Hamelin
- Commune
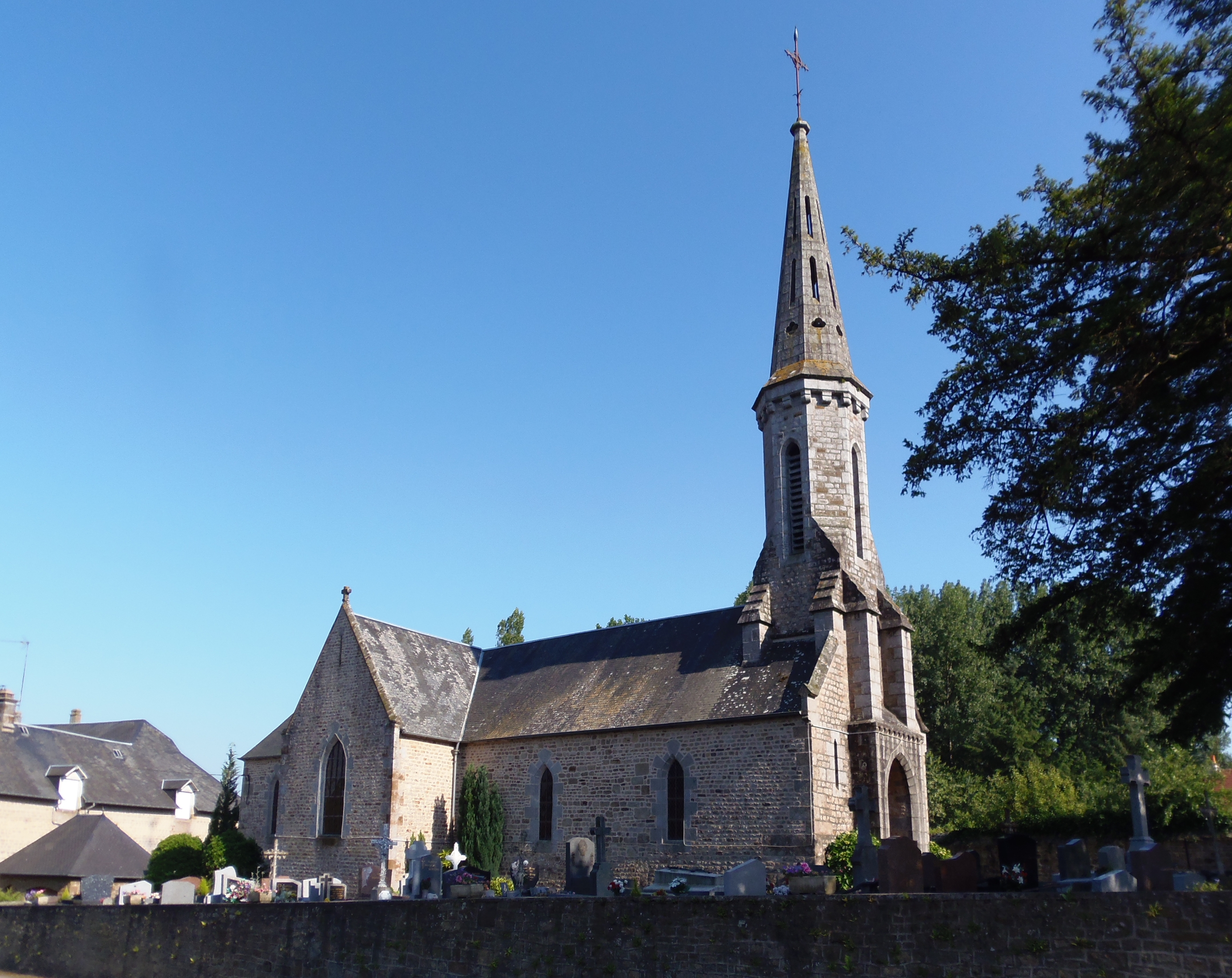
- The church of Saint-Martin
- Location of Hamelin
- Location within France Location within Normandy
- Coordinates: 48°32′41″N 1°12′29″W
- Country: France
- Region: Normandy
- Department: Manche
- Arrondissement: Avranches
- Canton: Saint-Hilaire-du-Harcouët
- Intercommunality: CA Mont-Saint-Michel-Normandie

Government
  - Mayor (2020–2026): Laurent Guéroc
- Area^{1}: 2.46 km^{2} (0.95 sq mi)
- Elevation: 100 m (330 ft)
- Highest elevation: 161 m (528 ft)
- Lowest elevation: 88 m (289 ft)
- Population (2023): 111
  - Density: 45.1/km^{2} (117/sq mi)
- Demonym: Hamelinois
- Time zone: UTC+01:00 (CET)
  - Summer (DST): UTC+02:00 (CEST)
- INSEE/Postal code: 50229 /50730
- ^{1} French Land Register data, which excludes lakes, ponds, glaciers > 1 km^{2} (0.386 sq mi or 247 acres) and river estuaries.

Hamelin (French pronunciation: [amlɛ̃]) is a commune in the Manche department in north-western France.

== See also ==
- Communes of the Manche department
