= Lapenty =

- Commune
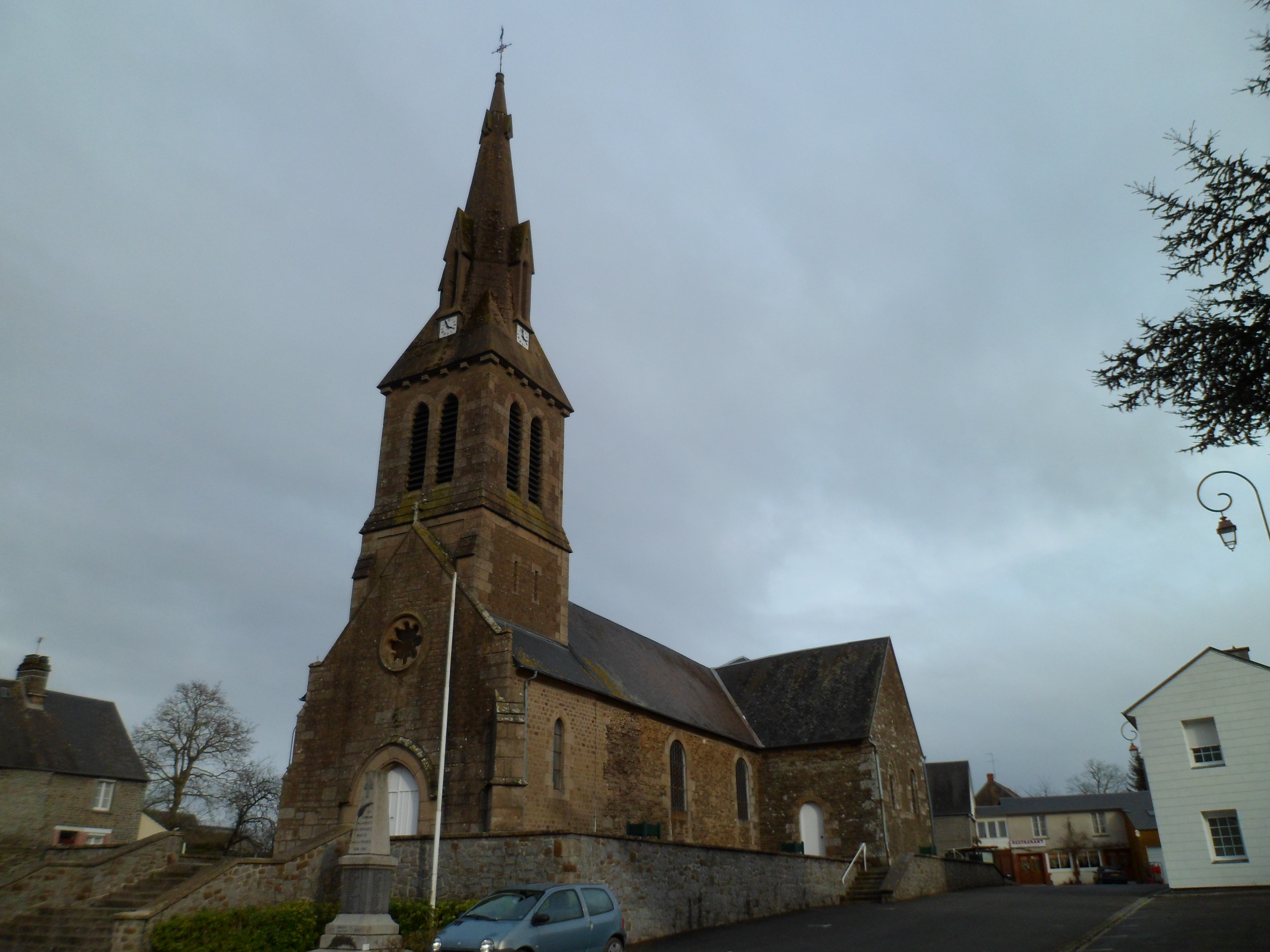
- The church of Saint-Ouen
- Location of Lapenty
- Location within France Location within Normandy
- Coordinates: 48°34′48″N 1°00′21″W
- Country: France
- Region: Normandy
- Department: Manche
- Arrondissement: Avranches
- Canton: Saint-Hilaire-du-Harcouët
- Intercommunality: CA Mont-Saint-Michel-Normandie

Government
  - Mayor (2020–2026): André Gautier
- Area^{1}: 14.89 km^{2} (5.75 sq mi)
- Highest elevation: 198 m (650 ft)
- Lowest elevation: 65 m (213 ft)
- Population (2023): 381
  - Density: 25.6/km^{2} (66.3/sq mi)
- Time zone: UTC+01:00 (CET)
  - Summer (DST): UTC+02:00 (CEST)
- INSEE/Postal code: 50263 /50600
- ^{1} French Land Register data, which excludes lakes, ponds, glaciers > 1 km^{2} (0.386 sq mi or 247 acres) and river estuaries.

Lapenty (French pronunciation: [lapɑ̃ti]) is a commune in the Manche department in north-western France.

== Heraldry ==
Arms of Lapenty	The arms of Lapenty are blazoned : Azure, a tower argent.

== See also ==
- Communes of the Manche department
