= Parigny, Manche =

Parigny
- Part of Grandparigny
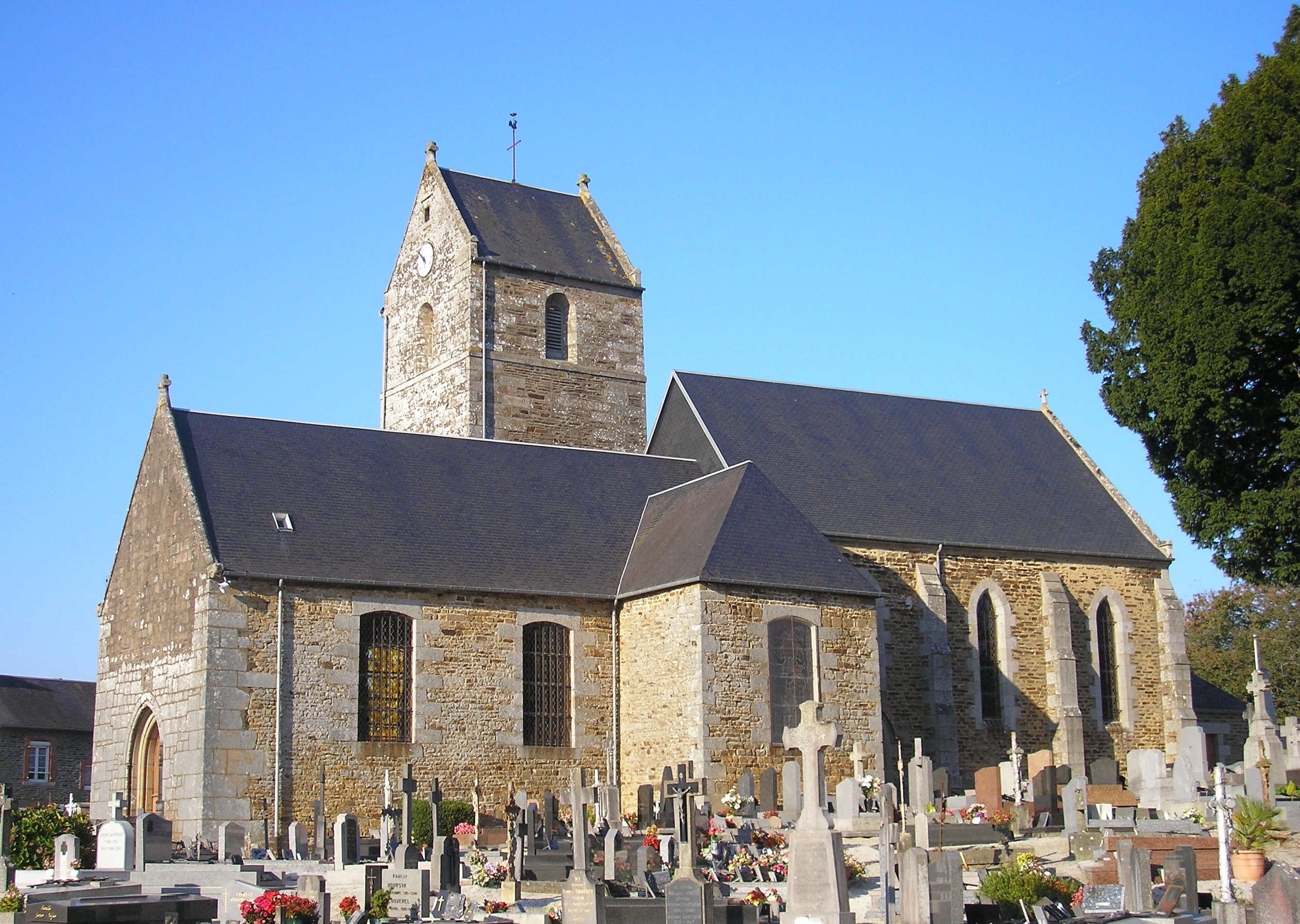
- The church
- Location of Parigny
- Location within France Location within Normandy
- Coordinates: 48°35′45″N 1°04′37″W
- Country: France
- Region: Normandy
- Department: Manche
- Arrondissement: Avranches
- Canton: Saint-Hilaire-du-Harcouët
- Commune: Grandparigny
- Area^{1}: 11.62 km^{2} (4.49 sq mi)
- Elevation: 75 m (246 ft)
- Highest elevation: 117 m (384 ft)
- Lowest elevation: 59 m (194 ft)
- Population (2022): 1,797
  - Density: 154.6/km^{2} (400.5/sq mi)
- Time zone: UTC+01:00 (CET)
  - Summer (DST): UTC+02:00 (CEST)
- Postal code: 50600
- ^{1} French Land Register data, which excludes lakes, ponds, glaciers > 1 km^{2} (0.386 sq mi or 247 acres) and river estuaries.

Parigny (French pronunciation: [paʁiɲi]) is a former commune in the Manche department in Normandy in north-western France. On 1 January 2016, it was merged into the new commune of Grandparigny.

== People ==
The leading geologist Simonne Caillère was born here in 1905.

== See also ==
- Communes of the Manche department
