= Moulines, Manche =

Moulines
- Commune
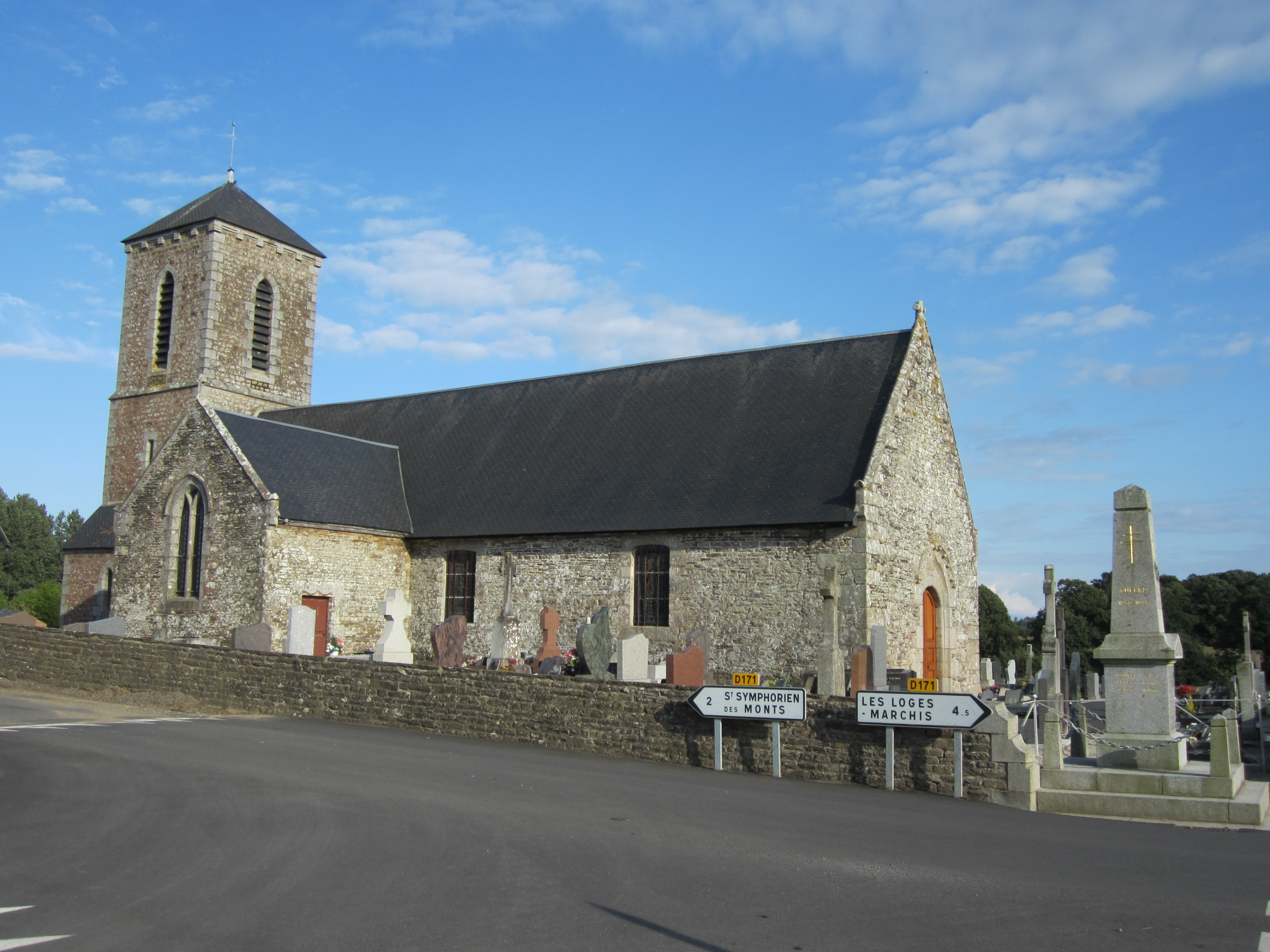
- The church of Saint-Martin
- Location of Moulines
- Location within France Location within Normandy
- Coordinates: 48°32′45″N 1°01′52″W
- Country: France
- Region: Normandy
- Department: Manche
- Arrondissement: Avranches
- Canton: Saint-Hilaire-du-Harcouët
- Intercommunality: CA Mont-Saint-Michel-Normandie

Government
  - Mayor (2020–2026): Fernand Bourget
- Area^{1}: 7.41 km^{2} (2.86 sq mi)
- Elevation: 140 m (460 ft)
- Highest elevation: 183 m (600 ft)
- Lowest elevation: 74 m (243 ft)
- Population (2023): 280
  - Density: 38/km^{2} (98/sq mi)
- Time zone: UTC+01:00 (CET)
  - Summer (DST): UTC+02:00 (CEST)
- INSEE/Postal code: 50362 /50600
- ^{1} French Land Register data, which excludes lakes, ponds, glaciers > 1 km^{2} (0.386 sq mi or 247 acres) and river estuaries.

Moulines (French pronunciation: [mulin]) is a commune in the Manche department in Normandy in north-western France.

== See also ==
- Communes of the Manche department
