= Saint-Laurent-de-Terregatte =

- Commune
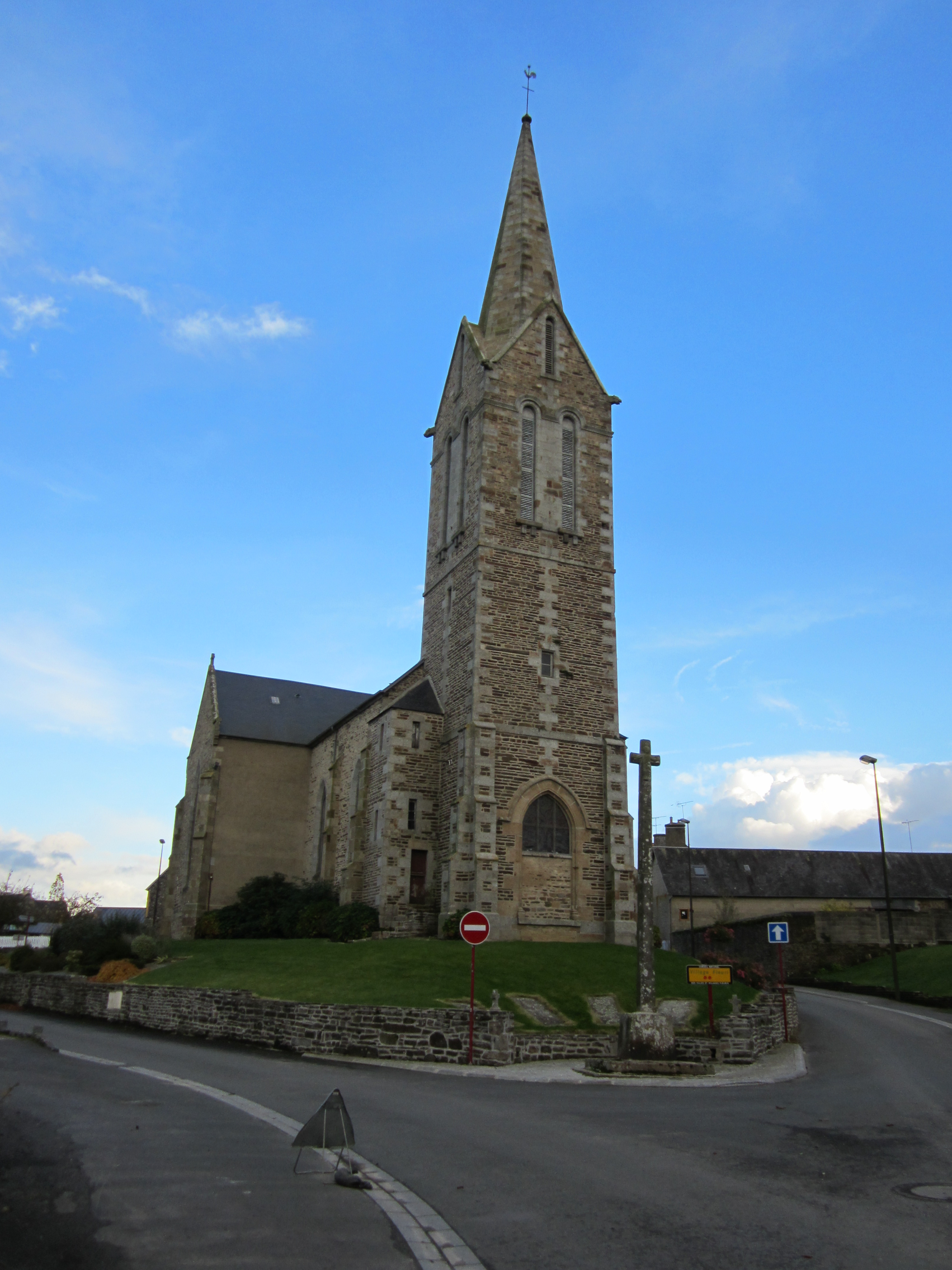
- The church of Saint-Laurent
- Location of Saint-Laurent-de-Terregatte
- Location within France Location within Normandy
- Coordinates: 48°34′23″N 1°15′28″W
- Country: France
- Region: Normandy
- Department: Manche
- Arrondissement: Avranches
- Canton: Saint-Hilaire-du-Harcouët
- Intercommunality: CA Mont-Saint-Michel-Normandie

Government
  - Mayor (2020–2026): Loïc Bailleul
- Area^{1}: 16.35 km^{2} (6.31 sq mi)
- Elevation: 115 m (377 ft)
- Highest elevation: 159 m (522 ft)
- Lowest elevation: 14 m (46 ft)
- Population (2023): 637
  - Density: 39.0/km^{2} (101/sq mi)
- Time zone: UTC+01:00 (CET)
  - Summer (DST): UTC+02:00 (CEST)
- INSEE/Postal code: 50500 /50240
- ^{1} French Land Register data, which excludes lakes, ponds, glaciers > 1 km^{2} (0.386 sq mi or 247 acres) and river estuaries.

Saint-Laurent-de-Terregatte (French pronunciation: [sɛ̃ loʁɑ̃ də tɛʁɡat]) is a commune in the Manche department in Normandy in north-western France. The commune is situated in the south of the Avranchin area. It is 6.5 km southeast of Ducey, 8.5 km northeast of Saint-James and 16 km west of Saint-Hilaire-du-Harcouët.

== See also ==
- Communes of the Manche department
