= Grandparigny =

- Commune
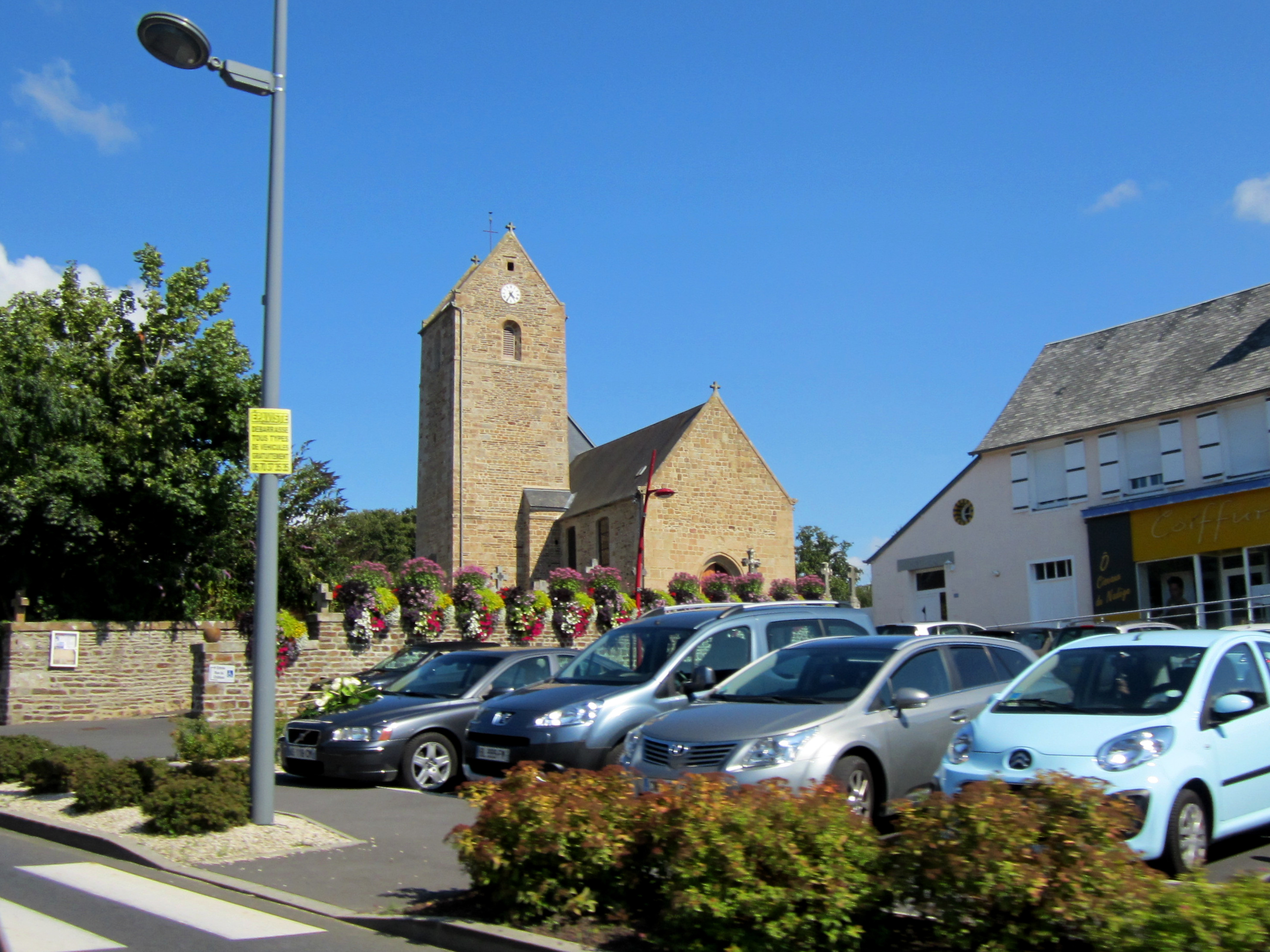
- The church in Grandparigny
- Location of Grandparigny
- Location within France Location within Normandy
- Coordinates: 48°35′35″N 1°05′02″W
- Country: France
- Region: Normandy
- Department: Manche
- Arrondissement: Avranches
- Canton: Saint-Hilaire-du-Harcouët
- Intercommunality: CA Mont-Saint-Michel-Normandie

Government
  - Mayor (2020–2026): Patrice Garnier
- Area^{1}: 34.61 km^{2} (13.36 sq mi)
- Population (2023): 2,605
  - Density: 75.27/km^{2} (194.9/sq mi)
- Time zone: UTC+01:00 (CET)
  - Summer (DST): UTC+02:00 (CEST)
- INSEE/Postal code: 50391 /50600
- ^{1} French Land Register data, which excludes lakes, ponds, glaciers > 1 km^{2} (0.386 sq mi or 247 acres) and river estuaries.

Grandparigny (French pronunciation: [ɡʁɑ̃paʁiɲi]) is a commune in the department of Manche, northwestern France. The municipality was established on 1 January 2016 by merger of the former communes of Chèvreville, Martigny, Milly and Parigny (the seat).

== Population ==
Population data refer to the area corresponding with the commune as of January 2025.

Historical population
Year	Pop.	±% p.a.
1968	2,207	—
1975	2,231	+0.15%
1982	2,319	+0.55%
1990	2,462	+0.75%
1999	2,551	+0.40%
2007	2,604	+0.26%
2012	2,751	+1.10%
2017	2,682	−0.51%
2023	2,605	−0.48%
Source: INSEE

== See also ==
- Communes of the Manche department
