= Le Mesnillard =

- Commune
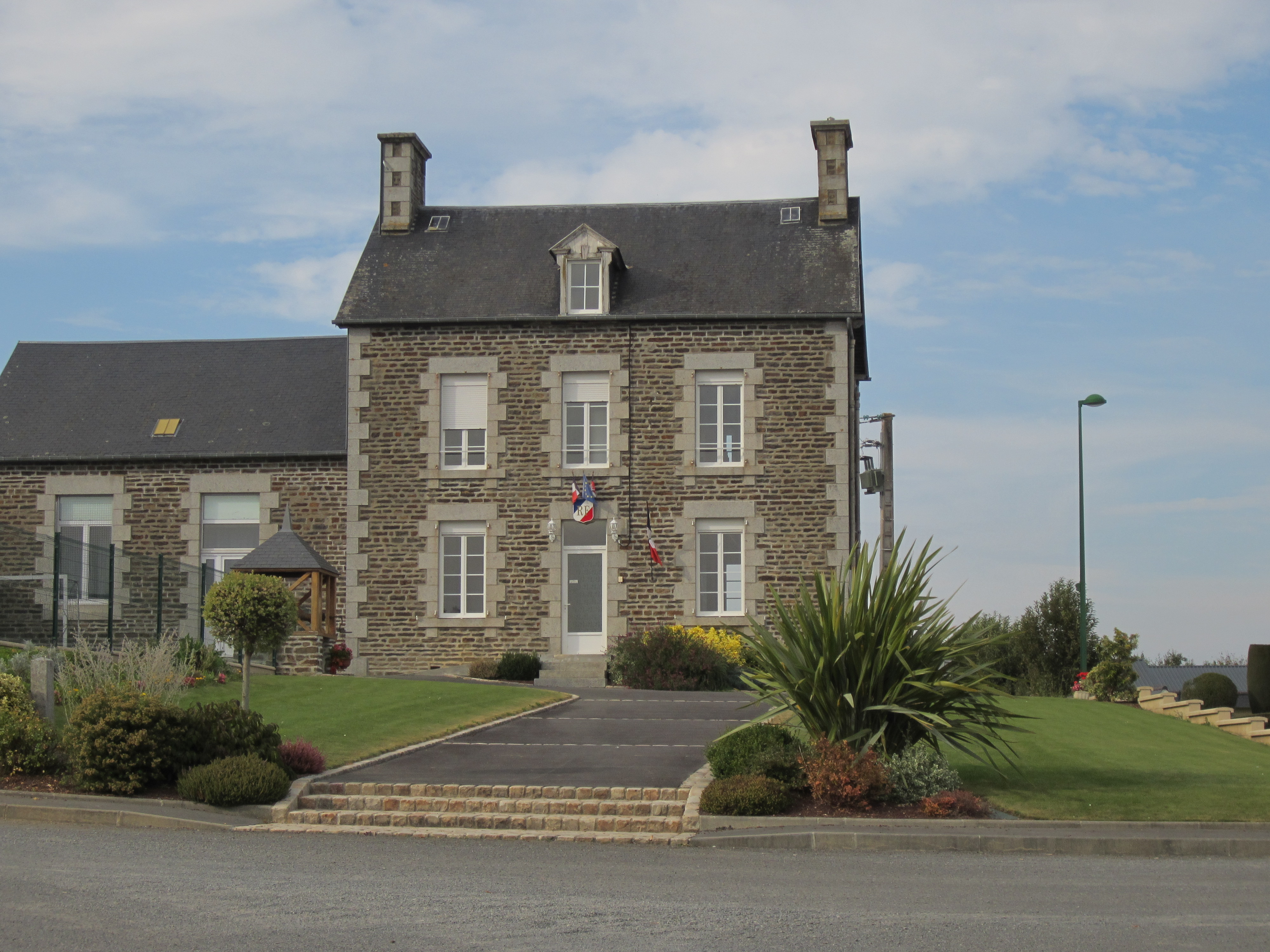
- Town hall
- Location of Le Mesnillard
- Location within France Location within Normandy
- Coordinates: 48°37′41″N 1°04′18″W
- Country: France
- Region: Normandy
- Department: Manche
- Arrondissement: Avranches
- Canton: Saint-Hilaire-du-Harcouët
- Intercommunality: CA Mont-Saint-Michel-Normandie

Government
  - Mayor (2024–2026): Christian Dunaud
- Area^{1}: 9.75 km^{2} (3.76 sq mi)
- Elevation: 96 m (315 ft)
- Highest elevation: 205 m (673 ft)
- Lowest elevation: 72 m (236 ft)
- Population (2023): 257
  - Density: 26.4/km^{2} (68.3/sq mi)
- Time zone: UTC+01:00 (CET)
  - Summer (DST): UTC+02:00 (CEST)
- INSEE/Postal code: 50315 /50600
- ^{1} French Land Register data, which excludes lakes, ponds, glaciers > 1 km^{2} (0.386 sq mi or 247 acres) and river estuaries.

Le Mesnillard (French pronunciation: [lə mɛnilaʁ]) is a commune in the Manche department in Normandy in north-western France.

== See also ==
- Communes of the Manche department
