= Martigny, Manche =

Martigny
- Part of Grandparigny
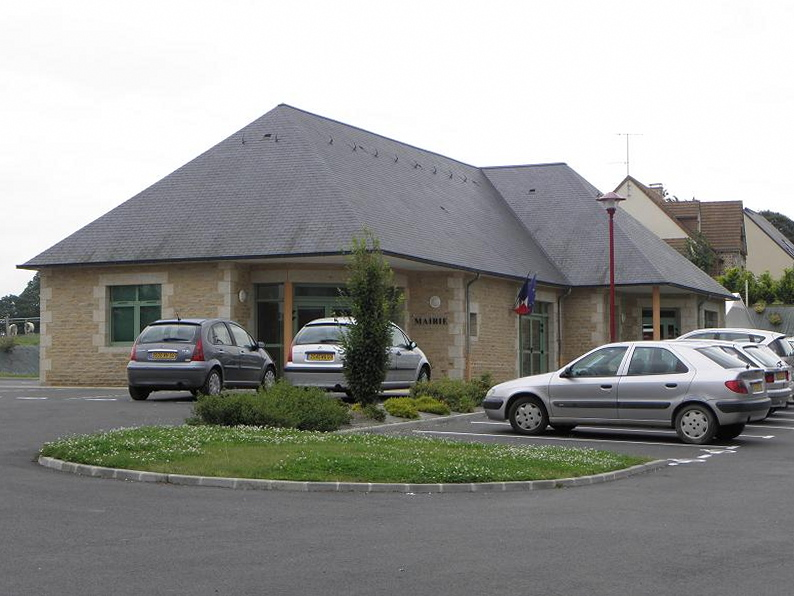
- Town hall
- Location of Martigny
- Location within France Location within Normandy
- Coordinates: 48°36′55″N 1°06′15″W
- Country: France
- Region: Normandy
- Department: Manche
- Arrondissement: Avranches
- Canton: Saint-Hilaire-du-Harcouët
- Commune: Grandparigny
- Area^{1}: 8.89 km^{2} (3.43 sq mi)
- Elevation: 120 m (390 ft)
- Highest elevation: 131 m (430 ft)
- Lowest elevation: 69 m (226 ft)
- Population (2022): 307
  - Density: 34.5/km^{2} (89.4/sq mi)
- Time zone: UTC+01:00 (CET)
  - Summer (DST): UTC+02:00 (CEST)
- Postal code: 50600
- ^{1} French Land Register data, which excludes lakes, ponds, glaciers > 1 km^{2} (0.386 sq mi or 247 acres) and river estuaries.

Martigny (French pronunciation: [maʁtiɲi]) is a former commune in the Manche department in Normandy in north-western France. On 1 January 2016, it was merged into the new commune of Grandparigny.

== See also ==
- Communes of the Manche department
