= Saint-Brice, Gironde =

Saint-Brice
- Commune
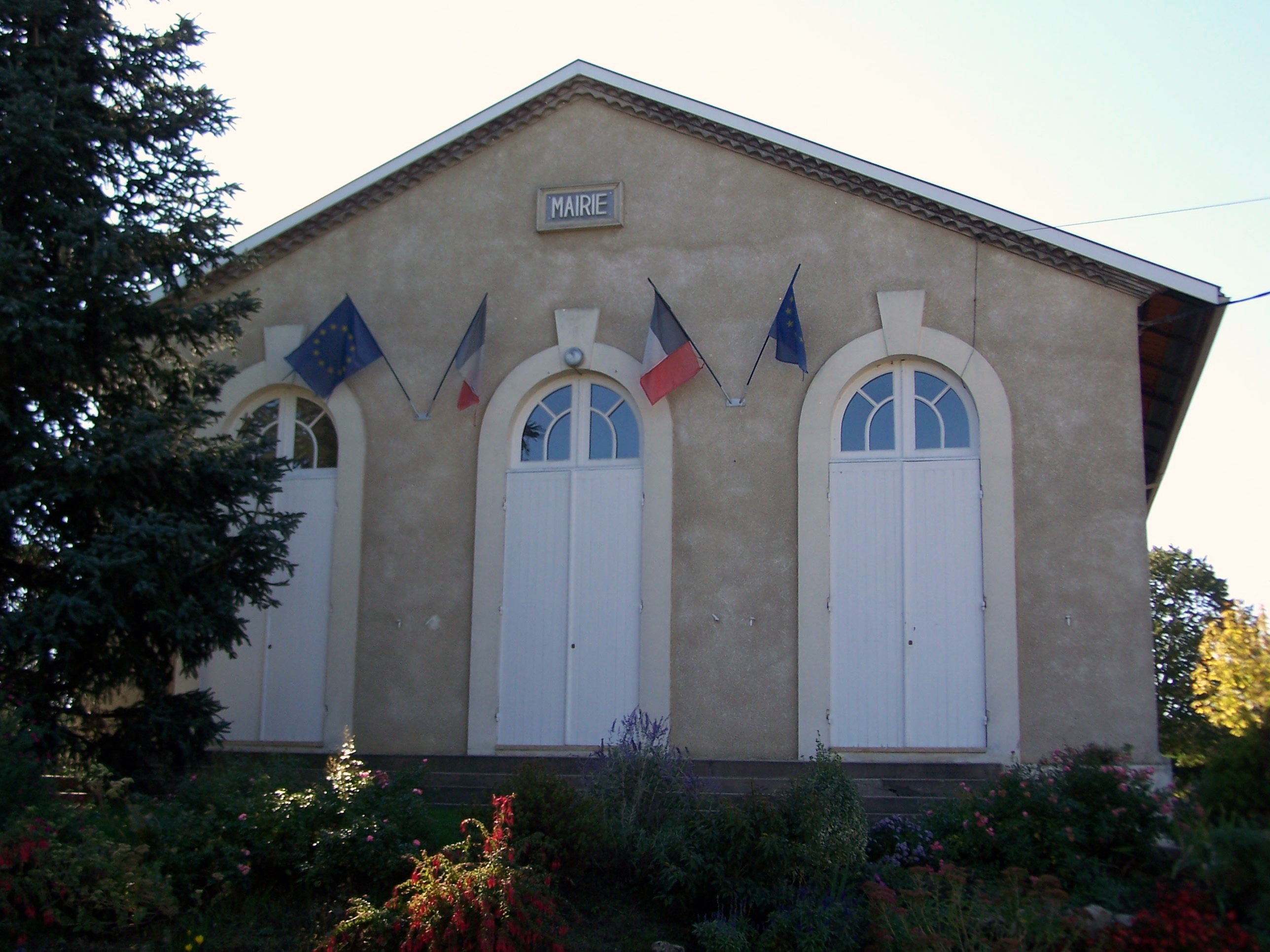
- Town hall
- Location of Saint-Brice
- Location within France Location within Nouvelle-Aquitaine
- Coordinates: 44°41′54″N 0°08′54″W
- Country: France
- Region: Nouvelle-Aquitaine
- Department: Gironde
- Arrondissement: Langon
- Canton: Le Réolais et Les Bastides

Government
  - Mayor (2020–2026): Laurence Ducourt
- Area^{1}: 5.76 km^{2} (2.22 sq mi)
- Elevation: 66 m (217 ft)
- Highest elevation: 102 m (335 ft)
- Lowest elevation: 48 m (157 ft)
- Population (2023): 314
  - Density: 54.5/km^{2} (141/sq mi)
- Time zone: UTC+01:00 (CET)
  - Summer (DST): UTC+02:00 (CEST)
- INSEE/Postal code: 33379 /33540
- ^{1} French Land Register data, which excludes lakes, ponds, glaciers > 1 km^{2} (0.386 sq mi or 247 acres) and river estuaries.

Saint-Brice (French pronunciation: [sɛ̃ bʁis]; Occitan: Sent Brici) is a commune in the Gironde department in Nouvelle-Aquitaine in southwestern France.

== Population ==
Historical population
Year	Pop.	±% p.a.
1968	325	—
1975	312	−0.58%
1982	278	−1.63%
1990	280	+0.09%
1999	297	+0.66%
2007	308	+0.46%
2012	301	−0.46%
2017	316	+0.98%
2023	314	−0.11%
Source: INSEE

== See also ==
- Communes of the Gironde department
