= Saint-Brice-de-Landelles =

- Commune
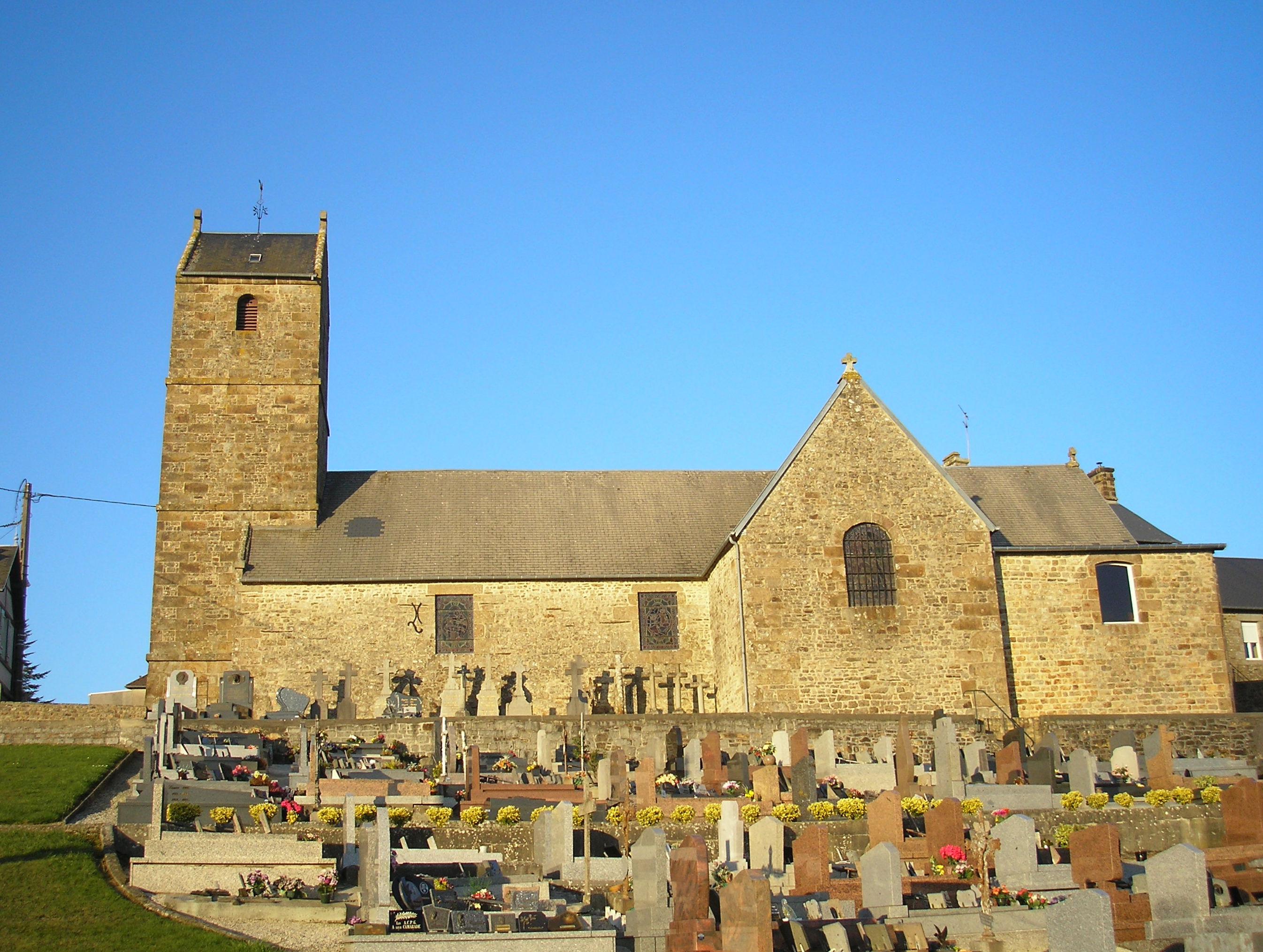
- The church of Saint-Brice
- Location of Saint-Brice-de-Landelles
- Location within France Location within Normandy
- Coordinates: 48°32′04″N 1°09′05″W
- Country: France
- Region: Normandy
- Department: Manche
- Arrondissement: Avranches
- Canton: Saint-Hilaire-du-Harcouët
- Intercommunality: CA Mont-Saint-Michel-Normandie

Government
  - Mayor (2020–2026): Joël Jacqueline
- Area^{1}: 14.77 km^{2} (5.70 sq mi)
- Elevation: 185 m (607 ft)
- Highest elevation: 202 m (663 ft)
- Lowest elevation: 59 m (194 ft)
- Population (2023): 652
  - Density: 44.1/km^{2} (114/sq mi)
- Time zone: UTC+01:00 (CET)
  - Summer (DST): UTC+02:00 (CEST)
- INSEE/Postal code: 50452 /50730
- ^{1} French Land Register data, which excludes lakes, ponds, glaciers > 1 km^{2} (0.386 sq mi or 247 acres) and river estuaries.

Saint-Brice-de-Landelles (French pronunciation: [sɛ̃ bʁis də lɑ̃dɛl]) is a commune in the Manche department in Normandy in north-western France.

== See also ==
- Communes of the Manche department
