= Canton of Saint-Hilaire-du-Harcouët =

Coordinates: 48.57°N 1.09°W

The canton of Saint-Hilaire-du-Harcouët is an administrative division of the Manche department, northwestern France. Its borders were modified at the French canton reorganisation which came into effect in March 2015. Its seat is in Saint-Hilaire-du-Harcouët.

It consists of the following communes:

1. Buais-les-Monts
2. Grandparigny
3. Hamelin
4. Lapenty
5. Les Loges-Marchis
6. Le Mesnillard
7. Montjoie-Saint-Martin
8. Moulines
9. Saint-Aubin-de-Terregatte
10. Saint-Brice-de-Landelles
11. Saint-Hilaire-du-Harcouët
12. Saint-James
13. Saint-Laurent-de-Terregatte
14. Saint-Senier-de-Beuvron
15. Savigny-le-Vieux
