= Romagny =

Romagny may refer to the following places in France:

- Romagny, Manche, a commune in the Manche department
- Romagny, Haut-Rhin, a commune in the Haut-Rhin department
