= Romagny-Fontenay =

- Commune
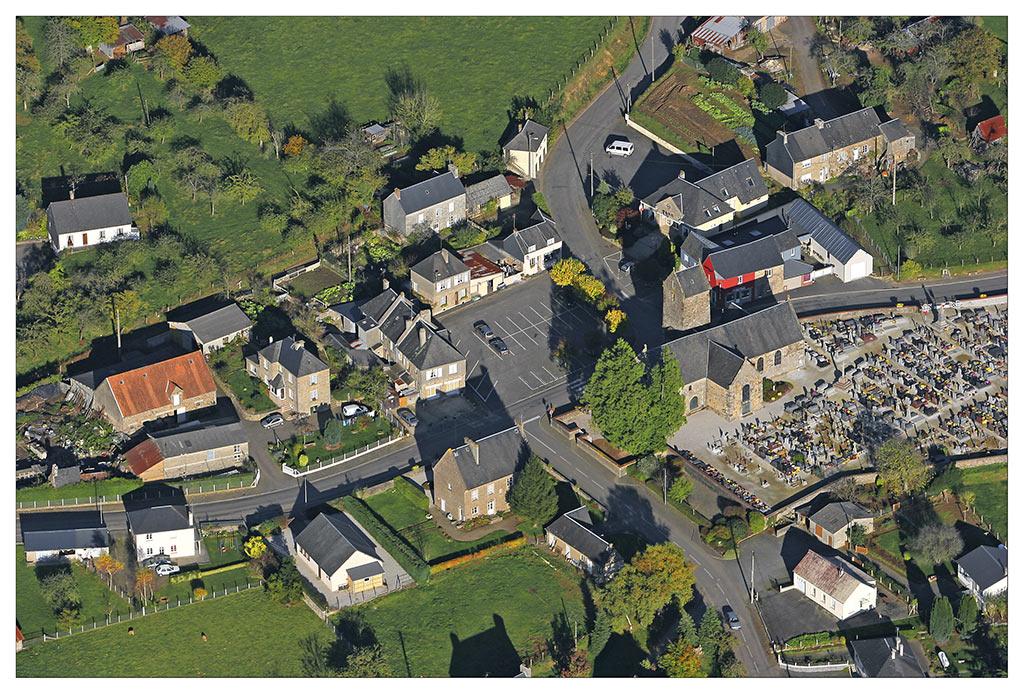
- An aerial view of Romagny
- Location of Romagny-Fontenay
- Location within France Location within Normandy
- Coordinates: 48°38′24″N 0°57′54″W
- Country: France
- Region: Normandy
- Department: Manche
- Arrondissement: Avranches
- Canton: Le Mortainais
- Intercommunality: CA Mont-Saint-Michel-Normandie
- Area^{1}: 36.31 km^{2} (14.02 sq mi)
- Population (2023): 1,243
  - Density: 34.23/km^{2} (88.66/sq mi)
- Time zone: UTC+01:00 (CET)
  - Summer (DST): UTC+02:00 (CEST)
- INSEE/Postal code: 50436 /50140
- ^{1} French Land Register data, which excludes lakes, ponds, glaciers > 1 km^{2} (0.386 sq mi or 247 acres) and river estuaries.

Romagny-Fontenay (French pronunciation: [ʁɔmaɲi fɔ̃tnɛ]) is a commune in the department of Manche, northwestern France. The municipality was established on 1 January 2016 by merger of the former communes of Romagny and Fontenay.

== See also ==
- Communes of the Manche department
