= Fontenay, Manche =

Fontenay
- Part of Romagny-Fontenay
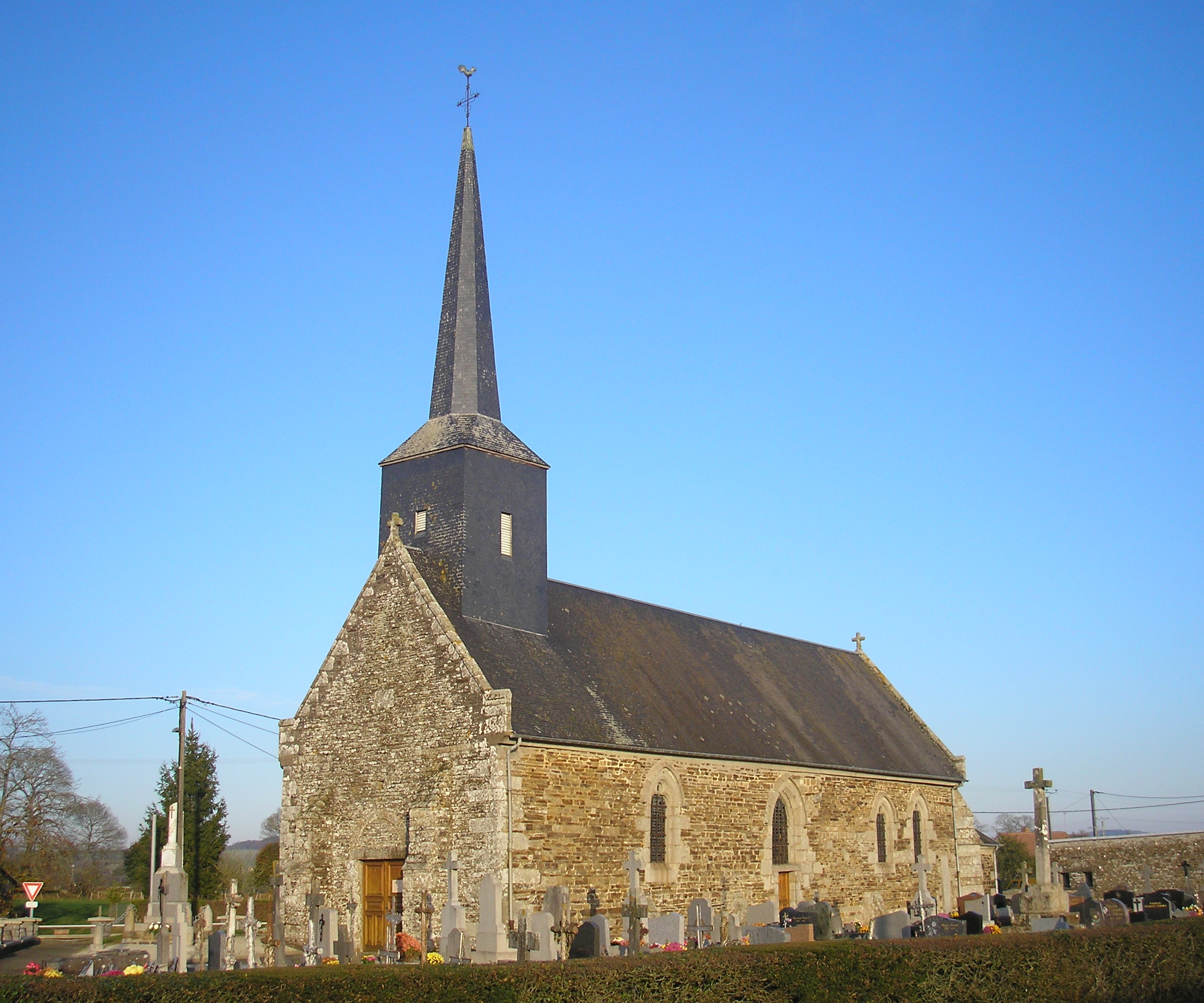
- The church of Saint-Pierre
- Location of Fontenay
- Location within France Location within Normandy
- Coordinates: 48°37′45″N 1°01′44″W
- Country: France
- Region: Normandy
- Department: Manche
- Arrondissement: Avranches
- Canton: Le Mortainais
- Commune: Romagny-Fontenay
- Area^{1}: 6.85 km^{2} (2.64 sq mi)
- Elevation: 100 m (330 ft)
- Highest elevation: 139 m (456 ft)
- Lowest elevation: 78 m (256 ft)
- Population (2022): 302
  - Density: 44.1/km^{2} (114/sq mi)
- Time zone: UTC+01:00 (CET)
  - Summer (DST): UTC+02:00 (CEST)
- Postal code: 50140
- ^{1} French Land Register data, which excludes lakes, ponds, glaciers > 1 km^{2} (0.386 sq mi or 247 acres) and river estuaries.

Fontenay (French pronunciation: [fɔ̃tnɛ]) is a former commune in the Manche department in north-western France. On 1 January 2016, it was merged into the new commune of Romagny-Fontenay.

== See also ==
- Communes of the Manche department
