= Romagny, Manche =

Romagny
- Part of Romagny-Fontenay
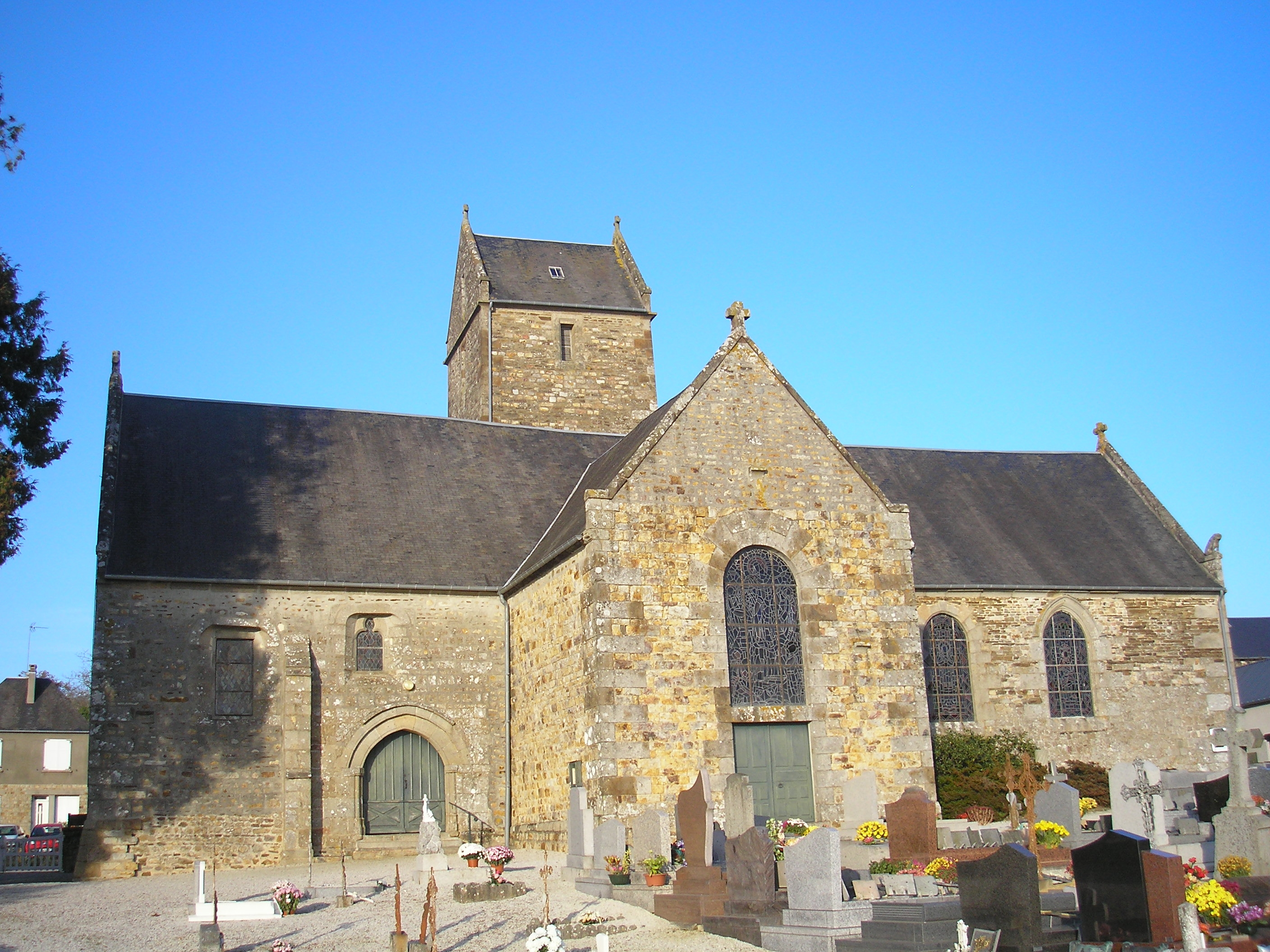
- The church of Notre-Dame
- Location of Romagny
- Location within France Location within Normandy
- Coordinates: 48°38′27″N 0°57′54″W
- Country: France
- Region: Normandy
- Department: Manche
- Arrondissement: Avranches
- Canton: Le Mortainais
- Commune: Romagny-Fontenay
- Area^{1}: 29.46 km^{2} (11.37 sq mi)
- Elevation: 115 m (377 ft)
- Highest elevation: 287 m (942 ft)
- Lowest elevation: 70 m (230 ft)
- Population (2022): 945
  - Density: 32.1/km^{2} (83.1/sq mi)
- Time zone: UTC+01:00 (CET)
  - Summer (DST): UTC+02:00 (CEST)
- Postal code: 50140
- ^{1} French Land Register data, which excludes lakes, ponds, glaciers > 1 km^{2} (0.386 sq mi or 247 acres) and river estuaries.

Romagny (French pronunciation: [ʁɔmaɲi]) is a former commune in the Manche department in Normandy in north-western France. On 1 January 2016, it was merged into the new commune of Romagny-Fontenay.

== See also ==
- Communes of the Manche department
