= Lingreville =

- Part of Tourneville-sur-Mer
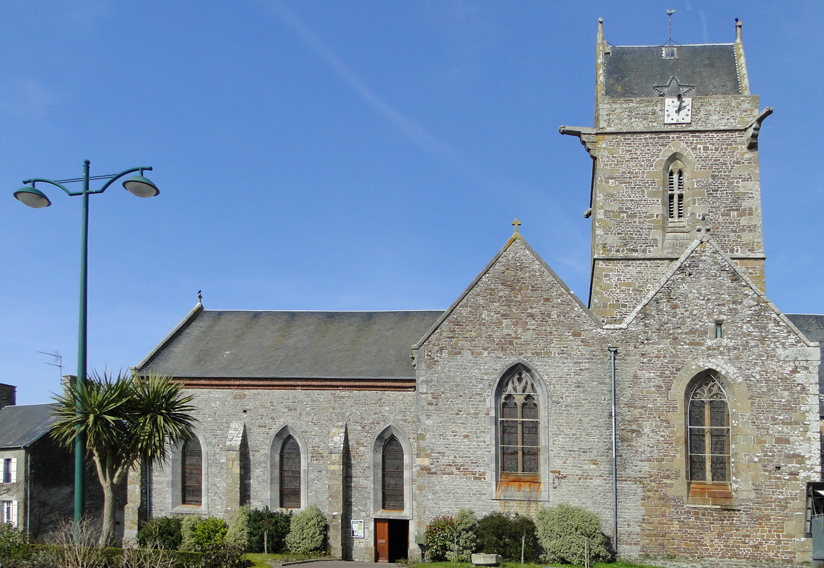
- The church of Saint-Martin
- Location of Lingreville
- Location within France Location within Normandy
- Coordinates: 48°57′05″N 1°31′33″W
- Country: France
- Region: Normandy
- Department: Manche
- Arrondissement: Coutances
- Canton: Quettreville-sur-Sienne
- Commune: Tourneville-sur-Mer
- Area^{1}: 9.04 km^{2} (3.49 sq mi)
- Elevation: 30 m (98 ft)
- Highest elevation: 61 m (200 ft)
- Lowest elevation: 2 m (6.6 ft)
- Population (2022): 1,031
  - Density: 114/km^{2} (295/sq mi)
- Time zone: UTC+01:00 (CET)
  - Summer (DST): UTC+02:00 (CEST)
- Postal code: 50660
- ^{1} French Land Register data, which excludes lakes, ponds, glaciers > 1 km^{2} (0.386 sq mi or 247 acres) and river estuaries.

Lingreville (French pronunciation: [lɛ̃ɡʁəvil]) is a former commune in the Manche department in Normandy in north-western France. On 1 January 2023, Lingreville merged with Annoville to form Tourneville-sur-Mer.

== See also ==
- Communes of the Manche department
