= Tourneville-sur-Mer =

Commune in Normandy, France

- Commune
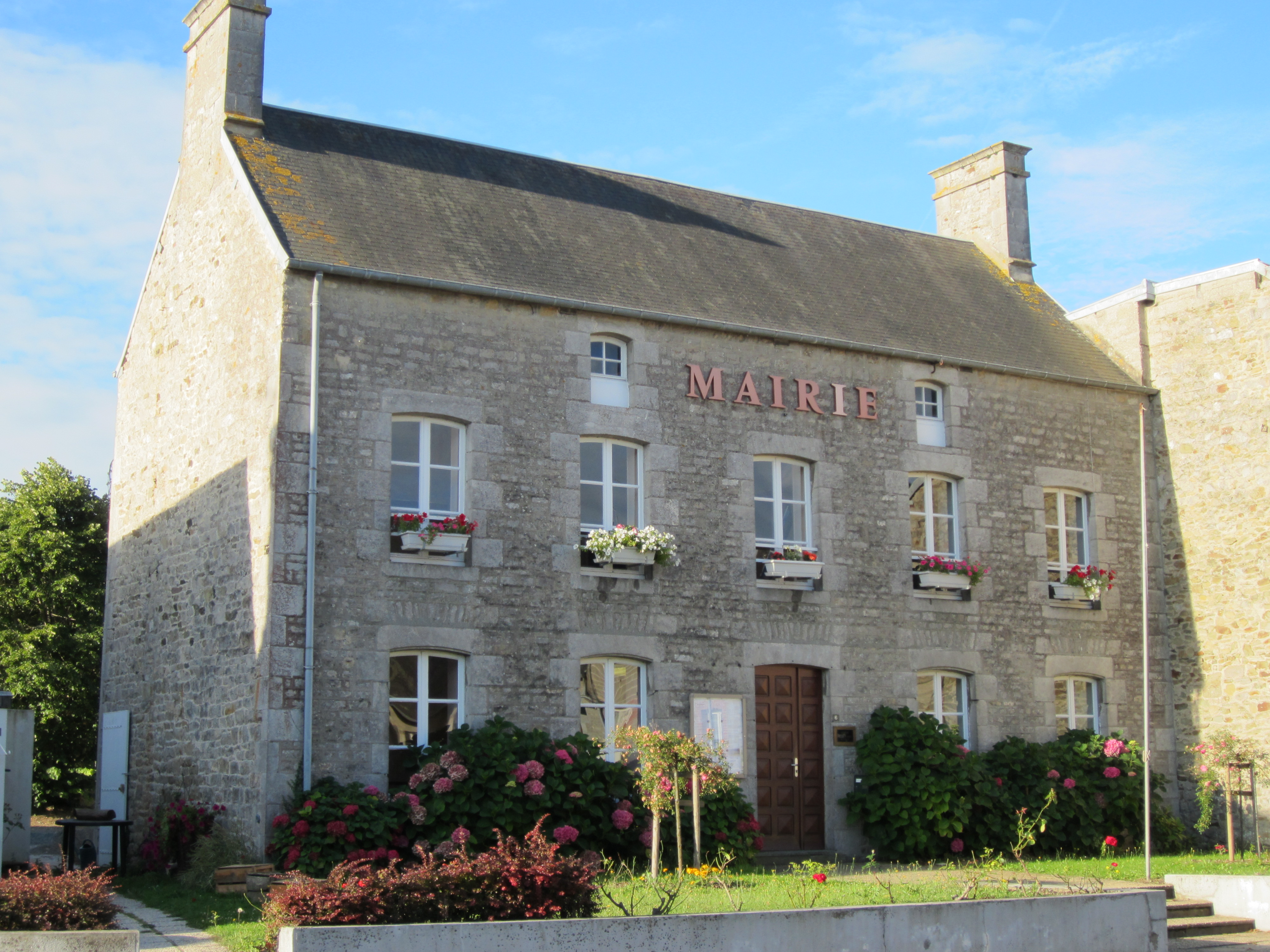
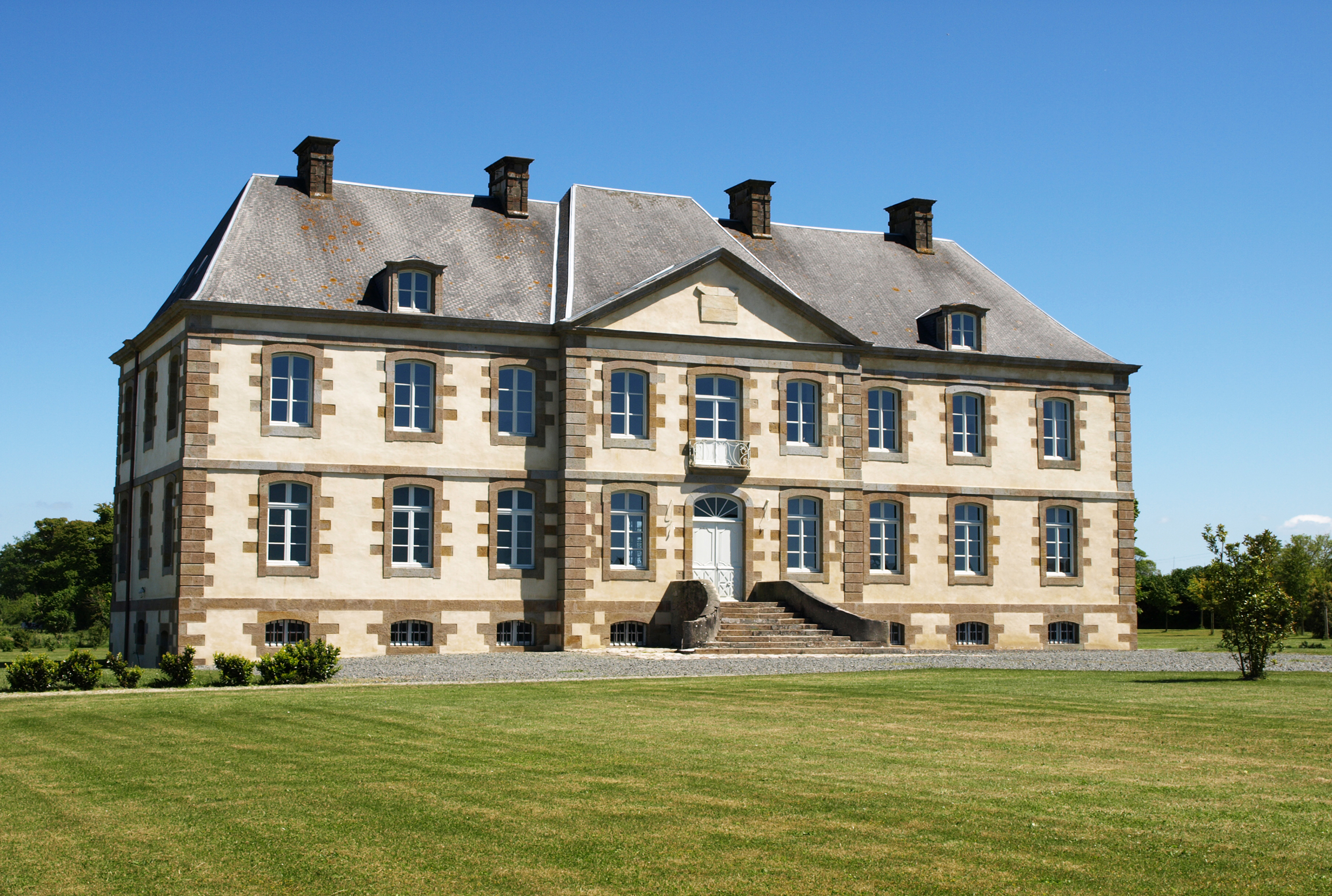
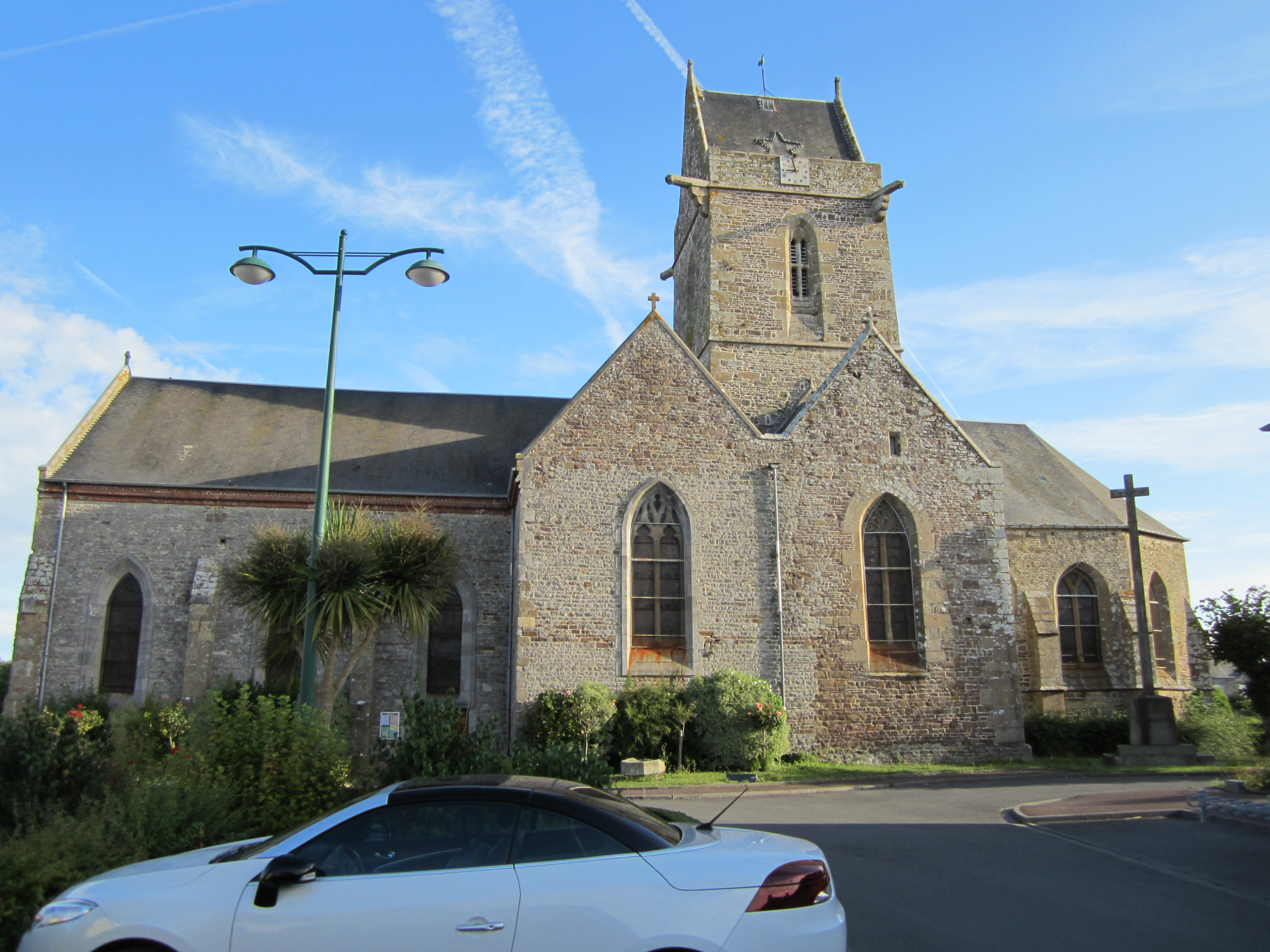
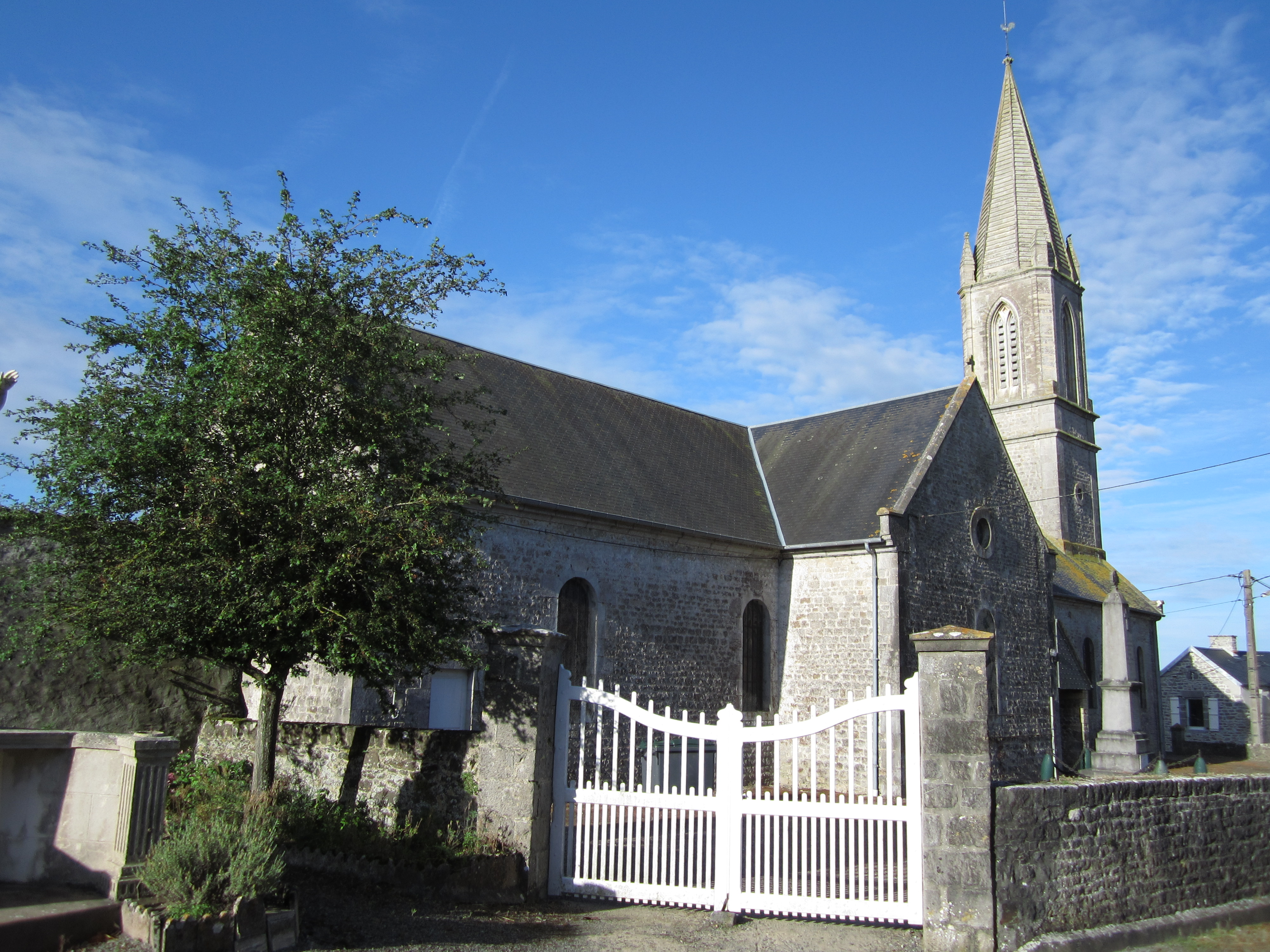
- From top to bottom, left to right: Town hall, Annoville Castle, Saint-Martin de Lingreville Church, Tourneville Church.
- Location of Tourneville-sur-Mer
- Location within France Location within Normandy
- Coordinates: 48°57′02″N 1°31′37″W
- Country: France
- Region: Normandy
- Department: Manche
- Arrondissement: Coutances
- Canton: Quettreville-sur-Sienne
- Intercommunality: CC Coutances Mer et Bocage

Government
  - Mayor (2023–2026): Sabrina Regnault
- Area^{1}: 17.51 km^{2} (6.76 sq mi)
- Highest elevation: 61 m (200 ft)
- Lowest elevation: 2 m (6.6 ft)
- Population (2023): 1,666
  - Density: 95.15/km^{2} (246.4/sq mi)
- Time zone: UTC+01:00 (CET)
  - Summer (DST): UTC+02:00 (CEST)
- INSEE/Postal code: 50272 /50660
- ^{1} French Land Register data, which excludes lakes, ponds, glaciers > 1 km^{2} (0.386 sq mi or 247 acres) and river estuaries.

Tourneville-sur-Mer is a commune in the Manche department in Normandy in northern France. It was established on 1 January 2023 from the amalgamation of the communes of Annoville and Lingreville.

== Etymology ==
Before the French Revolution, there was the parish of Tourneville, which today remains a hamlet adjoining Lingreville. This hamlet is the link between the two former municipalities. The name sur-Mer was added to distinguish it with Tourneville in the Eure department, in the same region.

== History ==
A project for a new municipality has been initiated with the municipalities of Annoville, Lingreville, Hauteville-sur-Mer, Montmartin-sur-Mer and Regnéville-sur-Mer as the study area. The mayor of Hauteville-sur-Mer was not in favor of it. Hauteville would back out of the proposal and the mayors of Regnéville and Montmartin also followed suit. However, the proposal continued with a reduced perimeter between the two neighboring municipalities of Annoville and Lingreville.

The two municipal councils adopt the project in early July 2022 and thus Annoville and Lingreville merged on 1 January 2023, forming Tourneville-sur-Mer.
