= Annoville =

- Part of Tourneville-sur-Mer
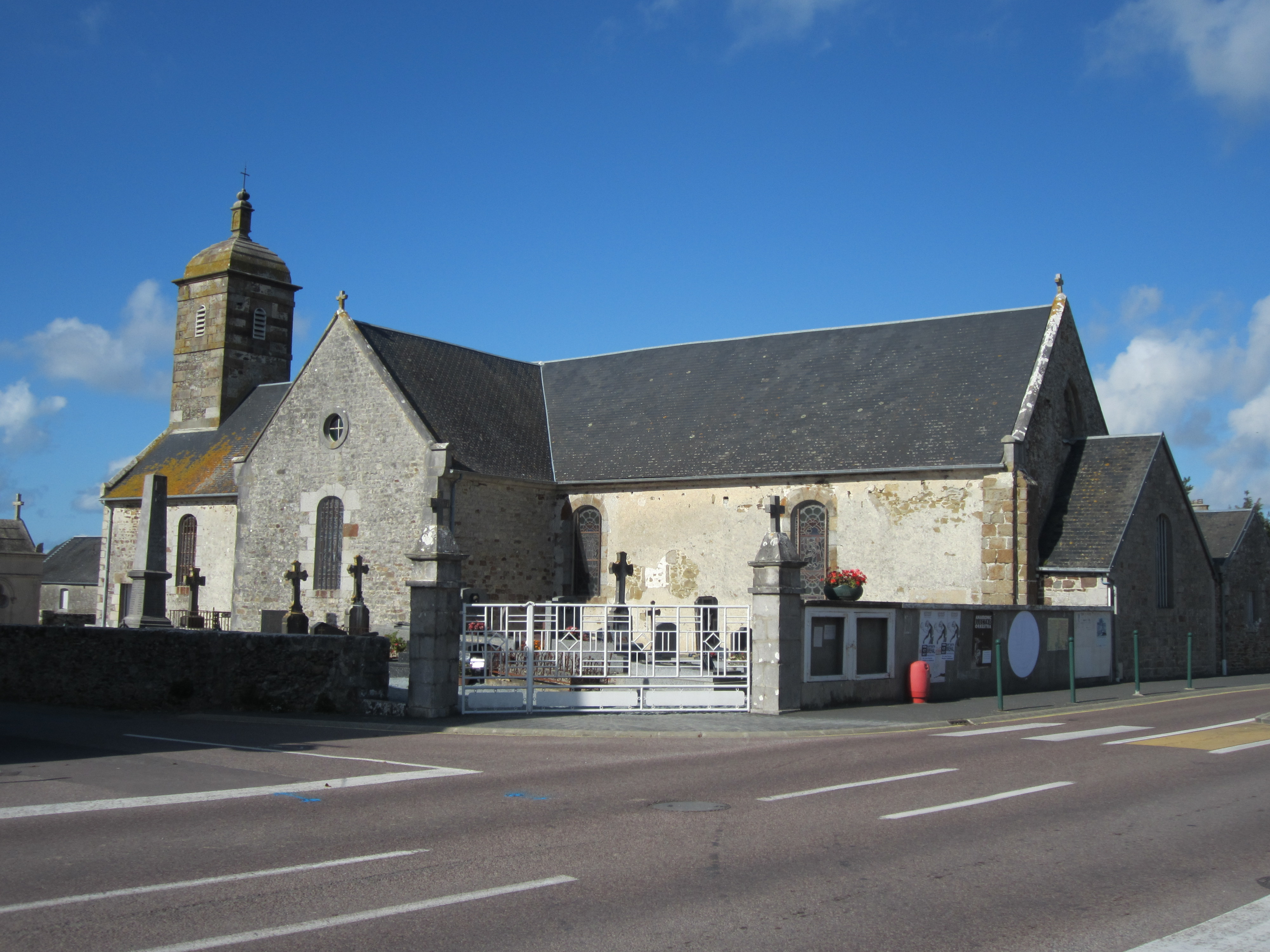
- Notre-Dame church
- Location of Annoville
- Location within France Location within Normandy
- Coordinates: 48°57′47″N 1°31′59″W
- Country: France
- Region: Normandy
- Department: Manche
- Arrondissement: Coutances
- Canton: Quettreville-sur-Sienne
- Commune: Tourneville-sur-Mer
- Area^{1}: 8.47 km^{2} (3.27 sq mi)
- Elevation: 28 m (92 ft)
- Highest elevation: 58 m (190 ft)
- Lowest elevation: 4 m (13 ft)
- Population (2023): 634
  - Density: 74.9/km^{2} (194/sq mi)
- Time zone: UTC+01:00 (CET)
  - Summer (DST): UTC+02:00 (CEST)
- Postal code: 50660
- ^{1} French Land Register data, which excludes lakes, ponds, glaciers > 1 km^{2} (0.386 sq mi or 247 acres) and river estuaries.

Annoville (French pronunciation: [anɔvil]) is a former commune in the Manche department in the Normandy region in northwestern France. On 1 January 2023, Annoville merged with Lingreville to form Tourneville-sur-Mer.

== See also ==
- Communes of the Manche department
