= Montpinchon =

- Commune
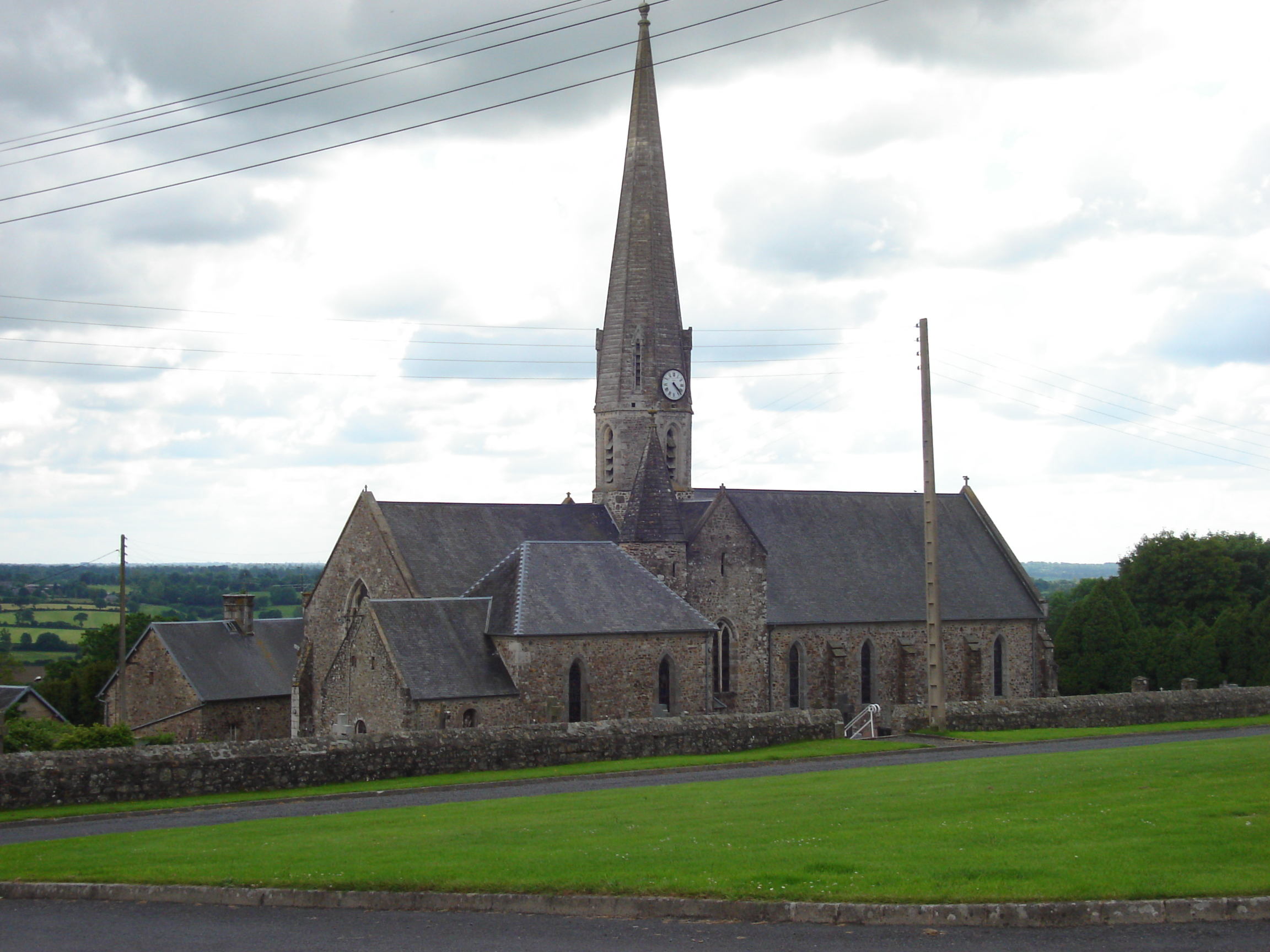
- Montpinchon church
- Location of Montpinchon
- Location within France Location within Normandy
- Coordinates: 49°01′23″N 1°18′32″W
- Country: France
- Region: Normandy
- Department: Manche
- Arrondissement: Coutances
- Canton: Quettreville-sur-Sienne
- Intercommunality: Coutances Mer et Bocage

Government
  - Mayor (2020–2026): Valerie Grieu-Leconte
- Area^{1}: 16.94 km^{2} (6.54 sq mi)
- Elevation: 142 m (466 ft)
- Highest elevation: 148 m (486 ft)
- Lowest elevation: 37 m (121 ft)
- Population (2023): 543
  - Density: 32.1/km^{2} (83.0/sq mi)
- Time zone: UTC+01:00 (CET)
  - Summer (DST): UTC+02:00 (CEST)
- INSEE/Postal code: 50350 /50210
- ^{1} French Land Register data, which excludes lakes, ponds, glaciers > 1 km^{2} (0.386 sq mi or 247 acres) and river estuaries.

Montpinchon (French pronunciation: [mɔ̃pɛ̃ʃɔ̃]) is a commune in the Manche department in Normandy in north-western France.

== Heraldry ==
| Arms of Montpinchon | The arms of Montpinchon are blazoned : Or, on a mount vert 2 keys in saltire argent, issuant from the mount 3 pine trees sable, and in chief in fess 3 annulets gules. Canting arms. rebus mount+pine; the 3 annulets are a reference to the arms of the Caillebot de La Salle family, former lords of Montpinchon and Cerisy |

== See also ==
- Communes of the Manche department
