= Belval =

Belval may refer to:

== Places in France ==
- Belval, Ardennes, in the Ardennes département
- Belval, Manche, in the Manche département
- Belval, Vosges, in the Vosges département
- Belval-Bois-des-Dames, in the Ardennes département
- Belval-en-Argonne, in the Marne département
- Belval-sous-Châtillon, in the Marne département

== Places elsewhere ==
- Belval, Luxembourg, a neighbourhood of Esch-sur-Alzette, in south-western Luxembourg
