= Pierre Bonnemains =

Major-General Pierre Bonnemains, Baron of Bonnemains (13 September 1773 in Tréauville – 9 November 1850 in Mesnil-Garnier, was a French officer during the Napoleonic Wars and a member of the French Parliament.

Bonnemains' name is inscribed on the southern pillar of the Arc de Triomphe in Paris.
