= Notre-Dame-de-Cenilly =

- Commune
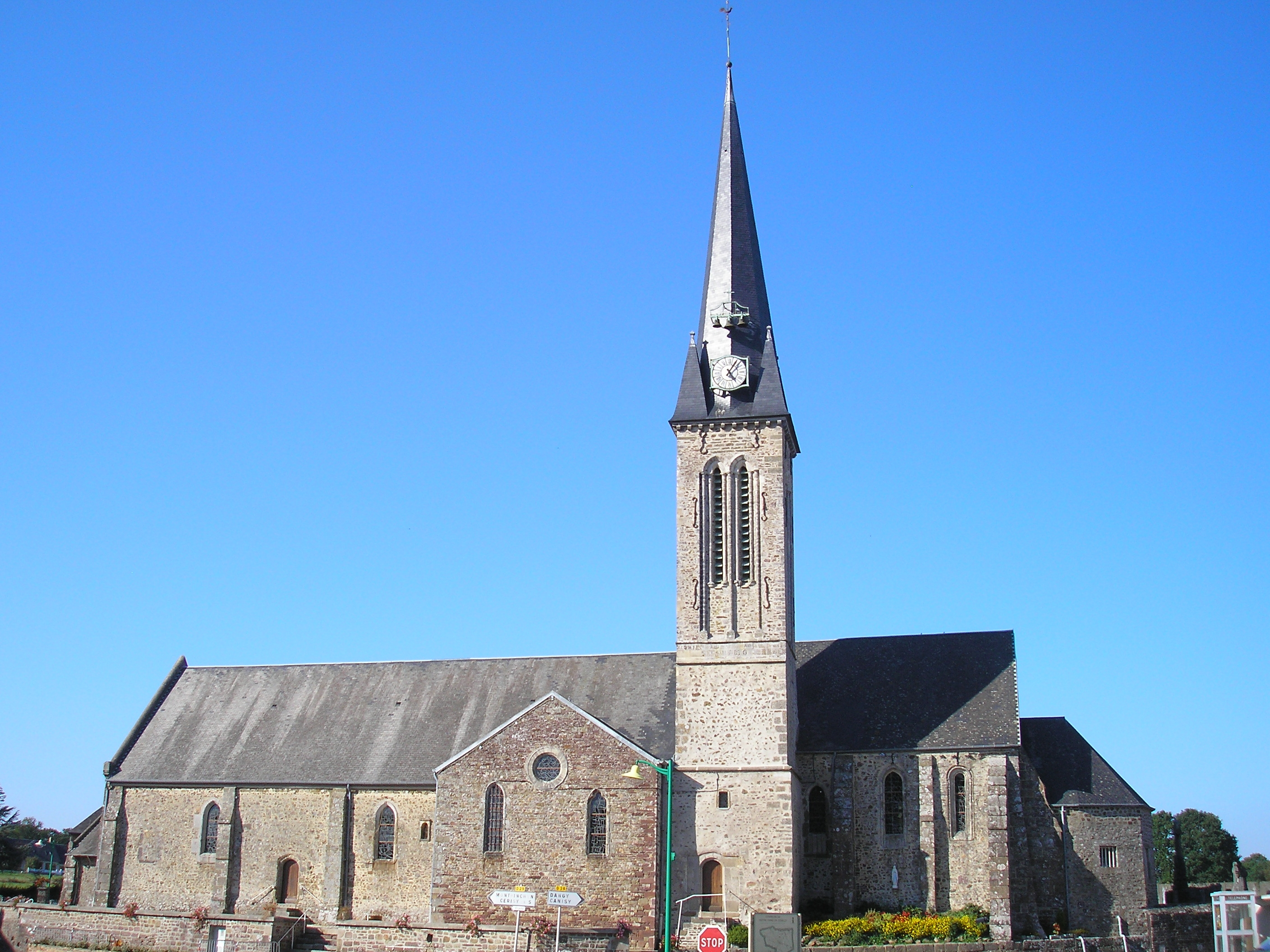
- The church of Notre-Dame
- Location of Notre-Dame-de-Cenilly
- Location within France Location within Normandy
- Coordinates: 48°59′44″N 1°15′23″W
- Country: France
- Region: Normandy
- Department: Manche
- Arrondissement: Coutances
- Canton: Quettreville-sur-Sienne
- Intercommunality: Coutances Mer et Bocage

Government
  - Mayor (2020–2026): Florent Delivert
- Area^{1}: 25.23 km^{2} (9.74 sq mi)
- Elevation: 128 m (420 ft)
- Highest elevation: 141 m (463 ft)
- Lowest elevation: 50 m (160 ft)
- Population (2023): 637
  - Density: 25.2/km^{2} (65.4/sq mi)
- Time zone: UTC+01:00 (CET)
  - Summer (DST): UTC+02:00 (CEST)
- INSEE/Postal code: 50378 /50210
- ^{1} French Land Register data, which excludes lakes, ponds, glaciers > 1 km^{2} (0.386 sq mi or 247 acres) and river estuaries.

Notre-Dame-de-Cenilly (French pronunciation: [nɔtʁ dam də səniji]) is a commune in the Manche department in Normandy in north-western France.

== Heraldry ==
Arms of Notre-Dame-de-Cenilly	The arms of Notre-Dame-de-Cenilly are blazoned : Azure, 2 arrows in saltire argent, on a canton gules, 2 leopards Or, armed and langued azure, and in sinister chief, a Virgin crowned, holding a sceptre fleury in her right hand, and in the left, the baby Jesus Or. Adopted by the municipal council 11 December 2008

== See also ==
- Communes of the Manche department

See also Village Life in Normandy which has details of local events and of the liberation in July 1994
