= Grimesnil =

- Commune
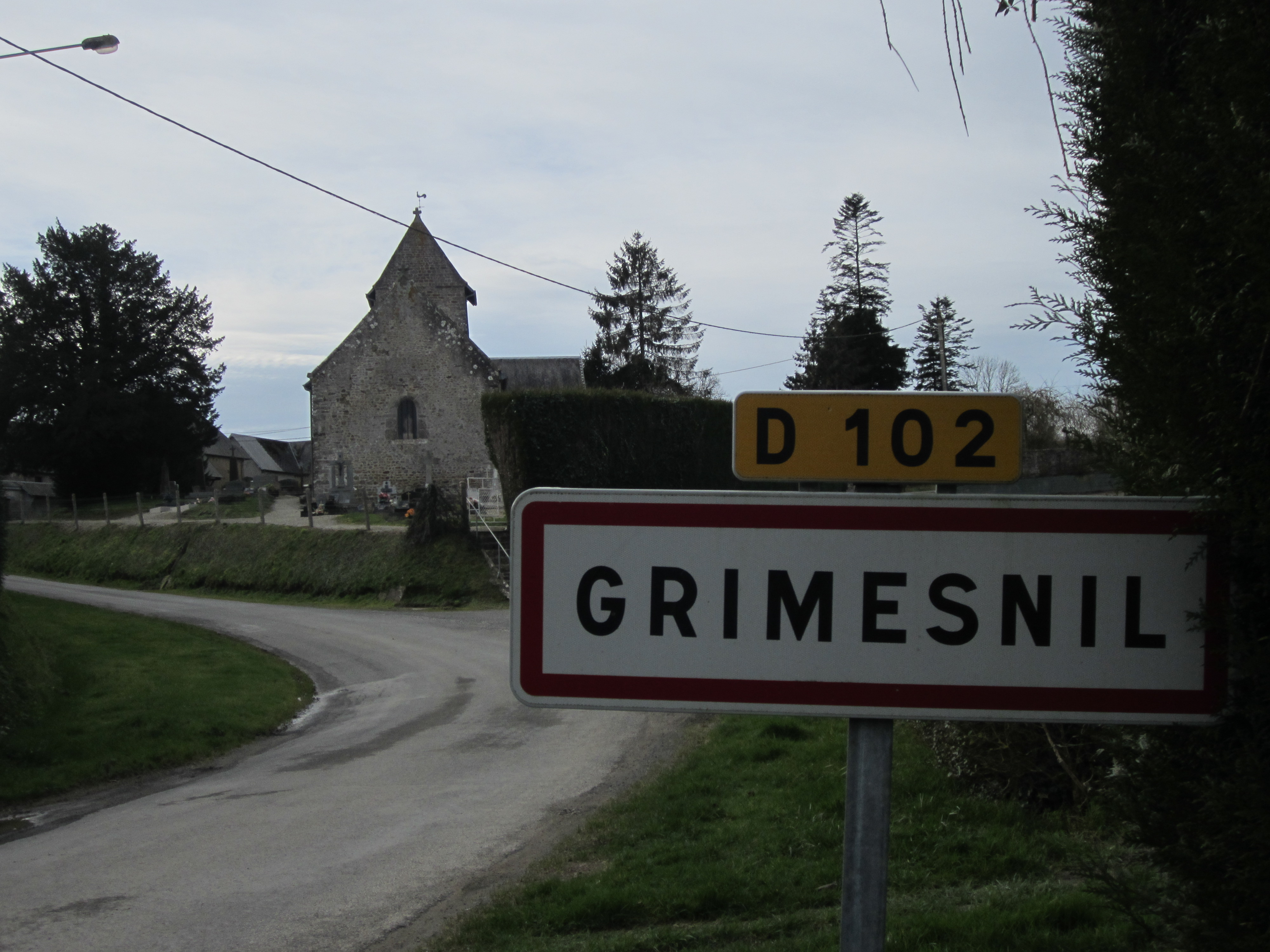
- Village entrance
- Location of Grimesnil
- Location within France Location within Normandy
- Coordinates: 48°57′17″N 1°20′56″W
- Country: France
- Region: Normandy
- Department: Manche
- Arrondissement: Coutances
- Canton: Quettreville-sur-Sienne
- Intercommunality: Coutances Mer et Bocage

Government
  - Mayor (2020–2026): Prisca Leblond
- Area^{1}: 2.61 km^{2} (1.01 sq mi)
- Elevation: 112 m (367 ft)
- Highest elevation: 118 m (387 ft)
- Lowest elevation: 45 m (148 ft)
- Population (2023): 71
  - Density: 27/km^{2} (70/sq mi)
- Time zone: UTC+01:00 (CET)
  - Summer (DST): UTC+02:00 (CEST)
- INSEE/Postal code: 50221 /50450
- ^{1} French Land Register data, which excludes lakes, ponds, glaciers > 1 km^{2} (0.386 sq mi or 247 acres) and river estuaries.

Grimesnil (French pronunciation: [ɡʁimenil]) is a commune in the Manche department in north-western France.

== See also ==
- Communes of the Manche department
