= Montaigu-les-Bois =

- Commune
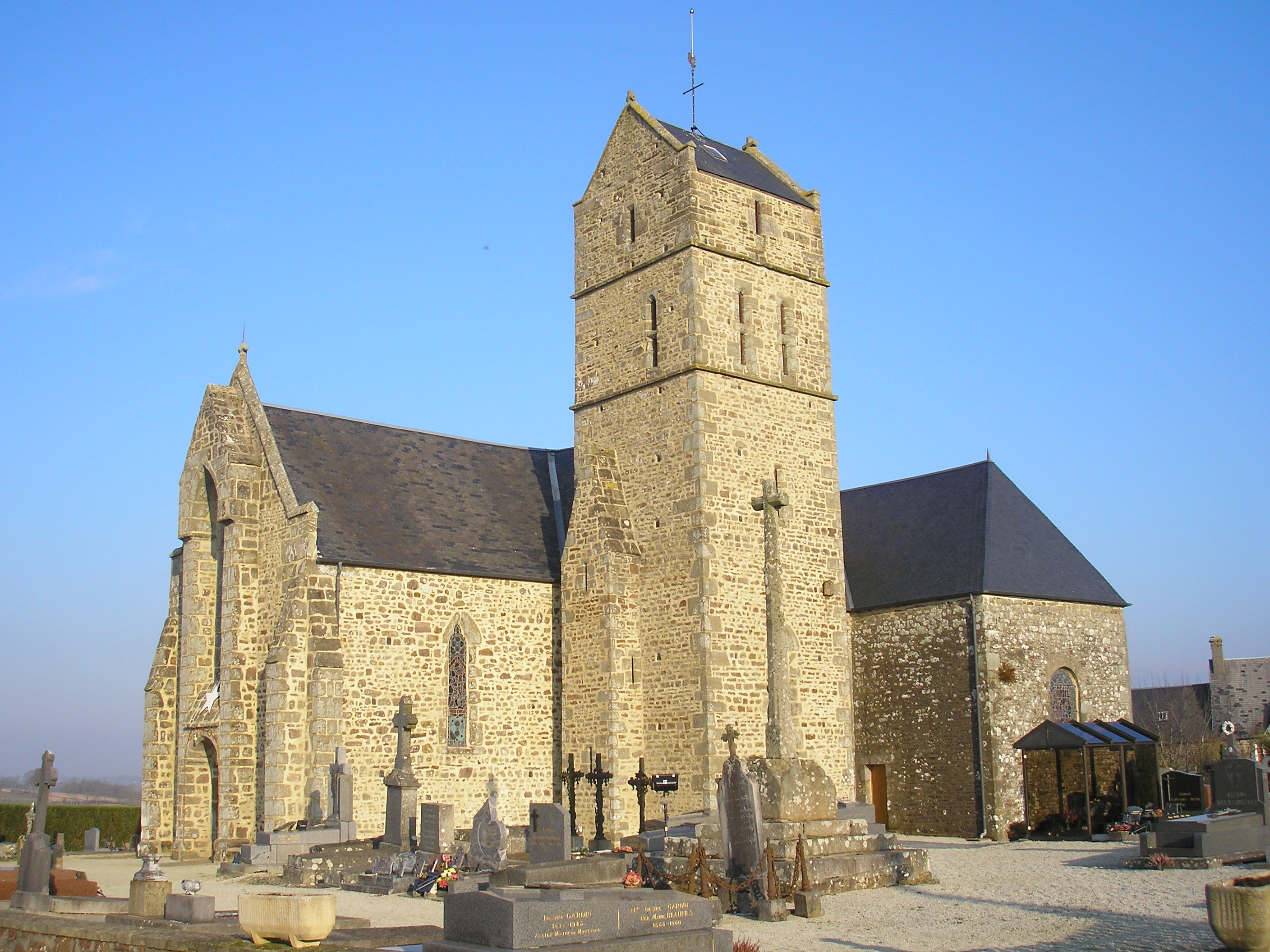
- Church Saint-Martin de Montaigu
- Location of Montaigu-les-Bois
- Location within France Location within Normandy
- Coordinates: 48°53′37″N 1°16′41″W
- Country: France
- Region: Normandy
- Department: Manche
- Arrondissement: Coutances
- Canton: Quettreville-sur-Sienne
- Intercommunality: Coutances Mer et Bocage

Government
  - Mayor (2020–2026): Bruno Launay
- Area^{1}: 6.67 km^{2} (2.58 sq mi)
- Highest elevation: 169 m (554 ft)
- Lowest elevation: 68 m (223 ft)
- Population (2023): 204
  - Density: 30.6/km^{2} (79.2/sq mi)
- Demonym: Montaiguais
- Time zone: UTC+01:00 (CET)
  - Summer (DST): UTC+02:00 (CEST)
- INSEE/Postal code: 50336 /50450
- ^{1} French Land Register data, which excludes lakes, ponds, glaciers > 1 km^{2} (0.386 sq mi or 247 acres) and river estuaries.

Montaigu-les-Bois (French pronunciation: [mɔ̃tɛɡy le bwa]) is a commune in the Manche department, located in the Normandy region of north-western France.

== See also ==
- Communes of the Manche department
