= Lengronne =

- Commune
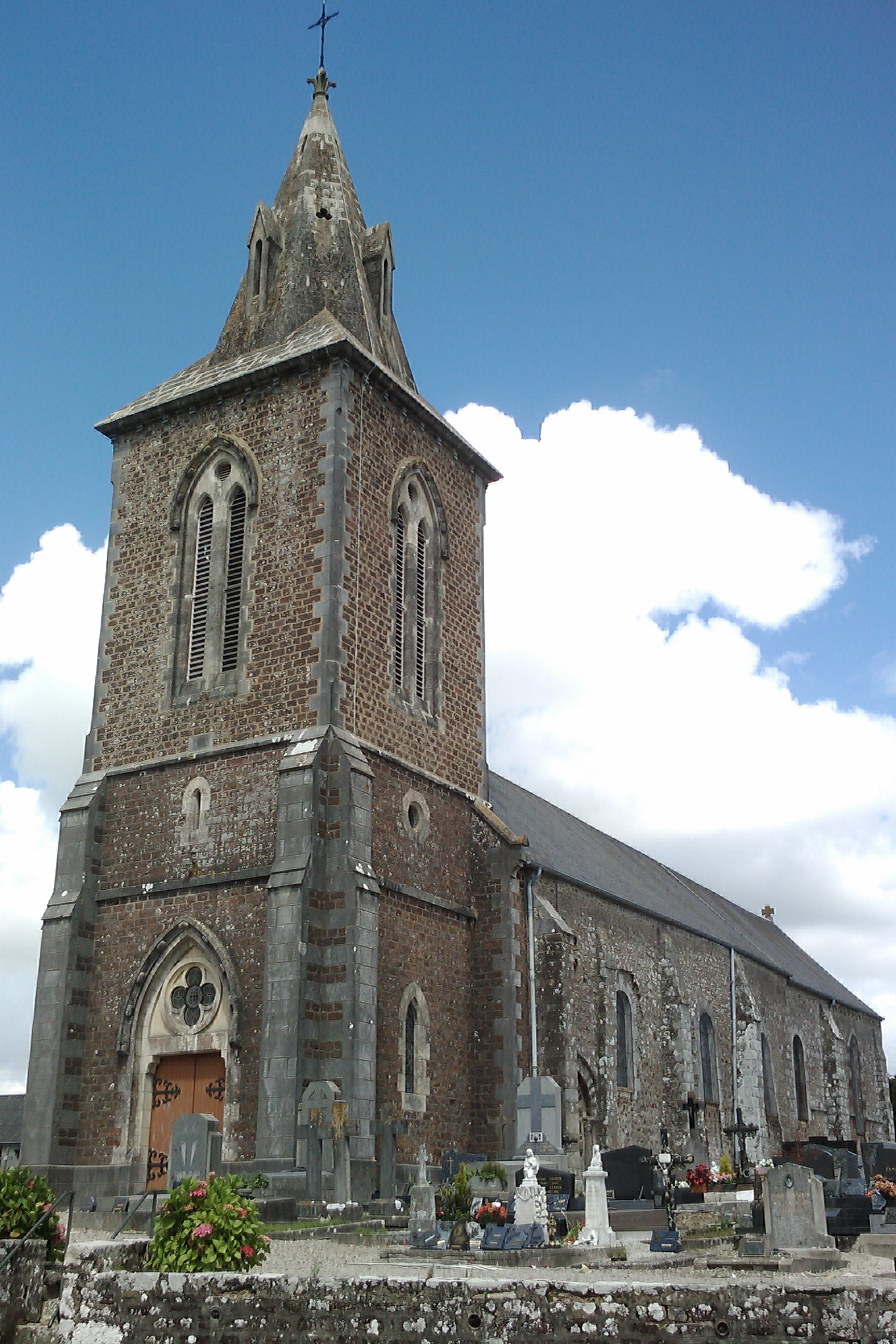
- The church of Saint-Ouen
- Location of Lengronne
- Location within France Location within Normandy
- Coordinates: 48°56′04″N 1°22′52″W
- Country: France
- Region: Normandy
- Department: Manche
- Arrondissement: Coutances
- Canton: Quettreville-sur-Sienne
- Intercommunality: Coutances Mer et Bocage

Government
  - Mayor (2020–2026): Sonia Larbi
- Area^{1}: 12.07 km^{2} (4.66 sq mi)
- Elevation: 111 m (364 ft)
- Highest elevation: 119 m (390 ft)
- Lowest elevation: 35 m (115 ft)
- Population (2023): 467
  - Density: 38.7/km^{2} (100/sq mi)
- Time zone: UTC+01:00 (CET)
  - Summer (DST): UTC+02:00 (CEST)
- INSEE/Postal code: 50266 /50450
- ^{1} French Land Register data, which excludes lakes, ponds, glaciers > 1 km^{2} (0.386 sq mi or 247 acres) and river estuaries.

Lengronne (French pronunciation: [lɑ̃ɡʁɔn]) is a commune in the Manche department in north-western France.

== See also ==
- Communes of the Manche department
