= Savigny, Manche =

Savigny
- Commune
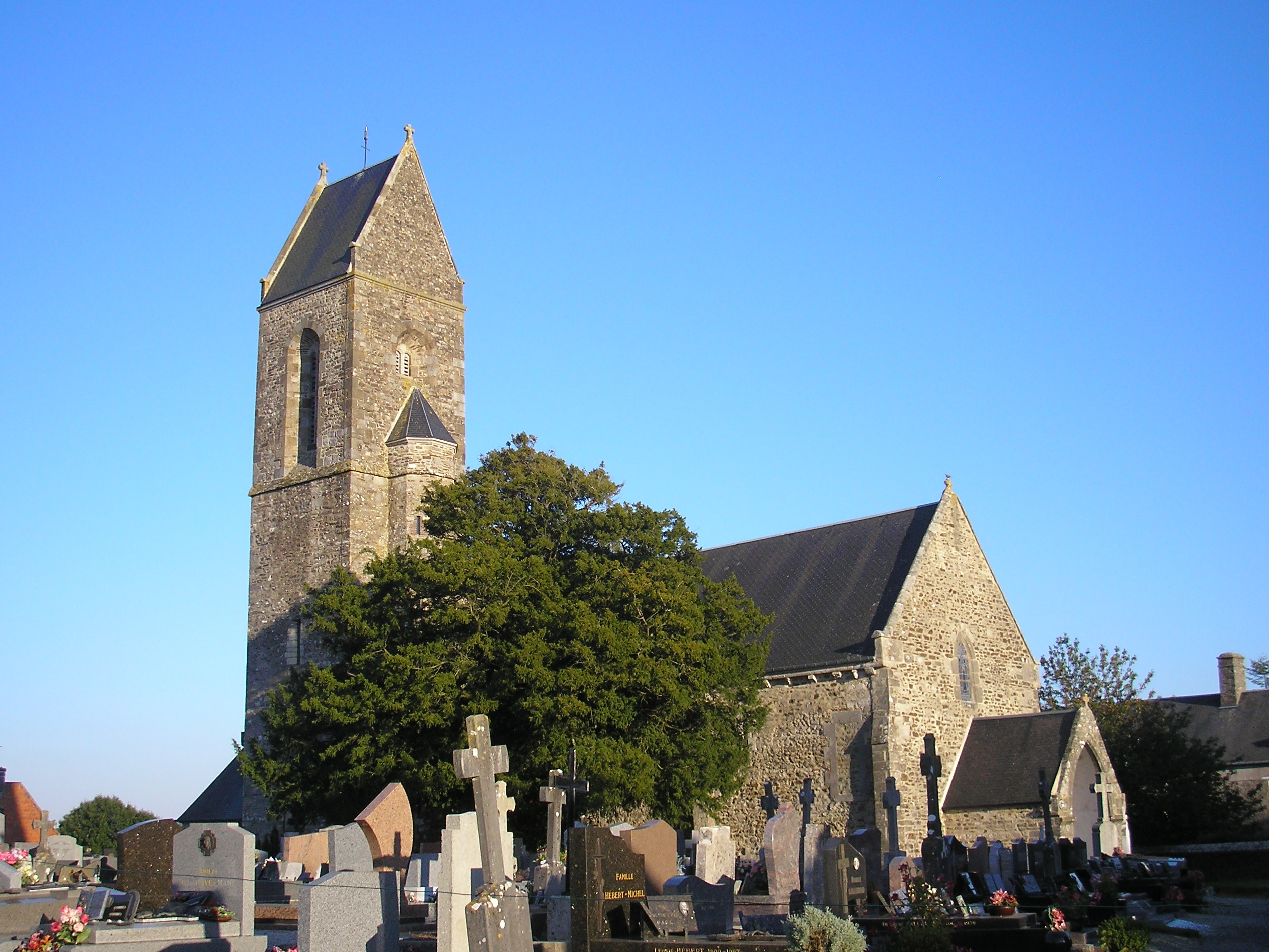
- The church of Notre-Dame

- Coat of arms
- Location of Savigny
- Location within France Location within Normandy
- Coordinates: 49°03′02″N 1°20′15″W
- Country: France
- Region: Normandy
- Department: Manche
- Arrondissement: Coutances
- Canton: Quettreville-sur-Sienne
- Intercommunality: Coutances Mer et Bocage

Government
  - Mayor (2020–2026): Vincent Leclerc
- Area^{1}: 10.16 km^{2} (3.92 sq mi)
- Elevation: 130 m (430 ft)
- Highest elevation: 135 m (443 ft)
- Lowest elevation: 35 m (115 ft)
- Population (2023): 430
  - Density: 42/km^{2} (110/sq mi)
- Time zone: UTC+01:00 (CET)
  - Summer (DST): UTC+02:00 (CEST)
- INSEE/Postal code: 50569 /50210
- ^{1} French Land Register data, which excludes lakes, ponds, glaciers > 1 km^{2} (0.386 sq mi or 247 acres) and river estuaries.

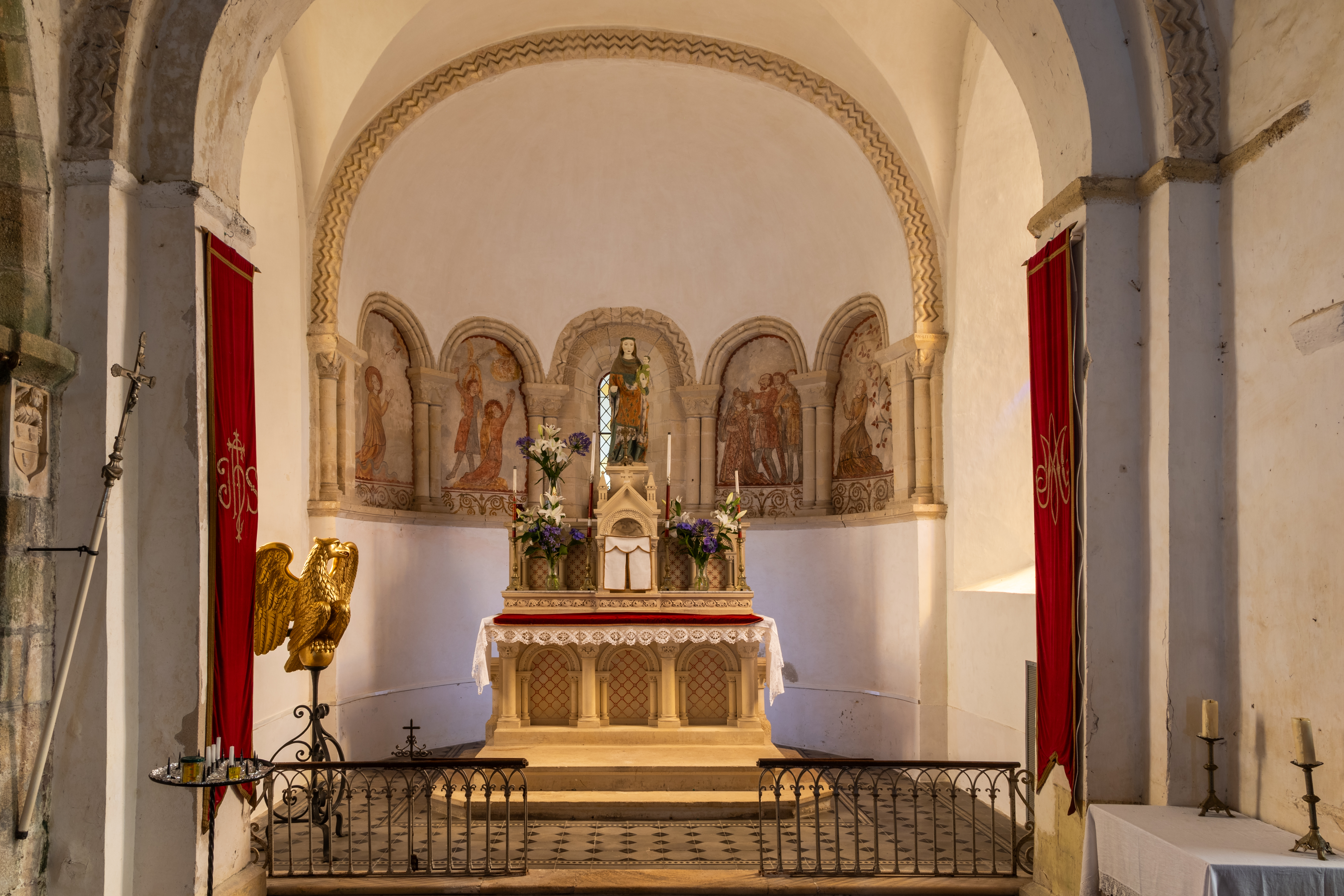
interior of the Église Notre-Dame-et-Sainte-Barbe

Savigny (French pronunciation: [saviɲi]) is a commune in the Manche department in Normandy in north-western France. Its historic sites include the church of Notre-Dame-et-Sainte-Barbe which has an early 12th-century Romanesque apse and 14th-century murals portraying the martyrdom of Saint Barbara. Wikimedia Commons featured an image of the interior as its "Picture of the Day" for December 4, 2024.

== See also ==
- Communes of the Manche department
