= Cametours =

- Commune
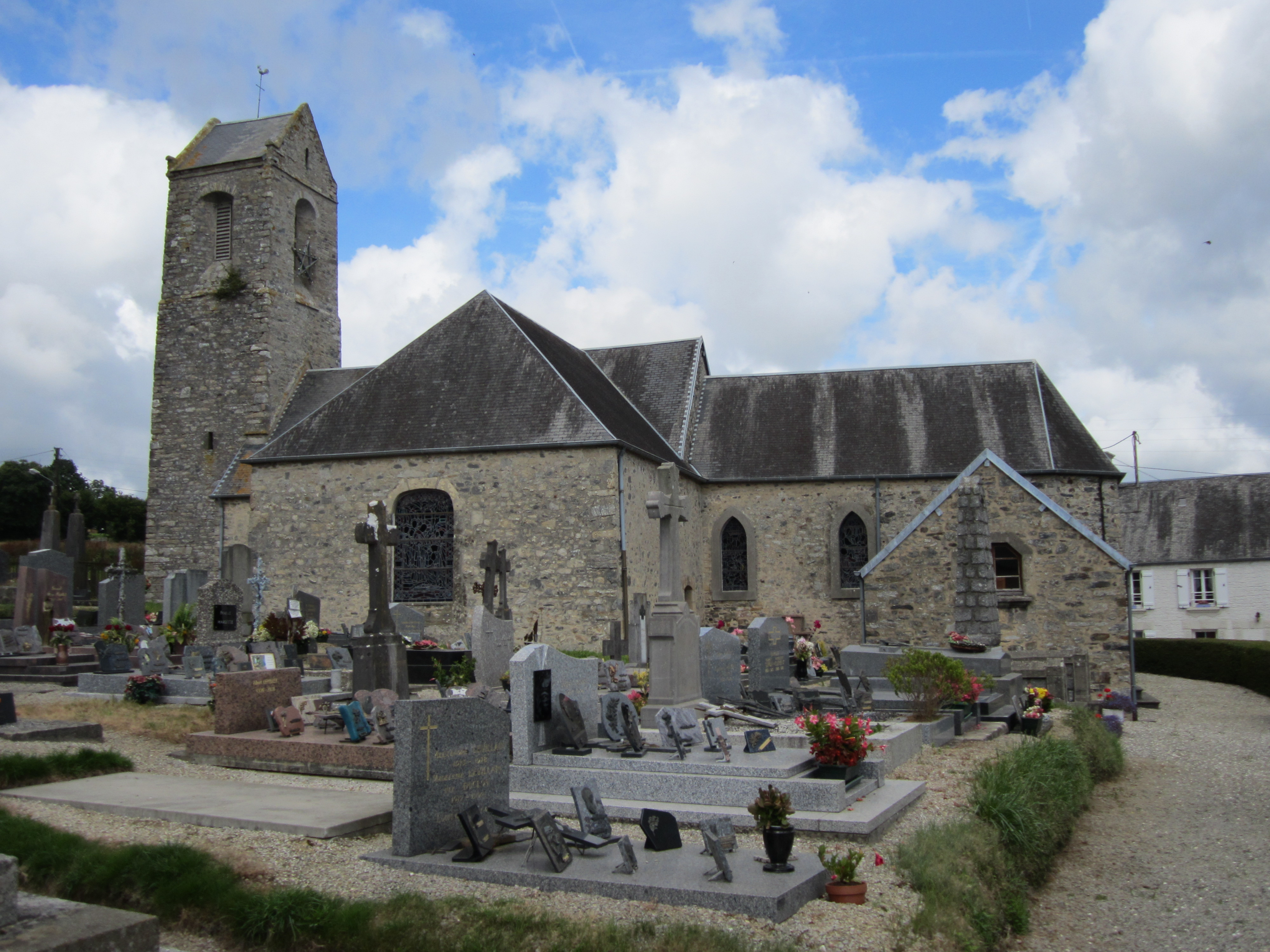
- The church of Saint-Pierre
- Location of Cametours
- Location within France Location within Normandy
- Coordinates: 49°04′09″N 1°16′45″W
- Country: France
- Region: Normandy
- Department: Manche
- Arrondissement: Coutances
- Canton: Quettreville-sur-Sienne
- Intercommunality: Coutances Mer et Bocage

Government
  - Mayor (2020–2026): Claude Lefevre
- Area^{1}: 7.22 km^{2} (2.79 sq mi)
- Elevation: 111 m (364 ft)
- Highest elevation: 126 m (413 ft)
- Lowest elevation: 64 m (210 ft)
- Population (2023): 434
  - Density: 60.1/km^{2} (156/sq mi)
- Time zone: UTC+01:00 (CET)
  - Summer (DST): UTC+02:00 (CEST)
- INSEE/Postal code: 50093 /50570
- ^{1} French Land Register data, which excludes lakes, ponds, glaciers > 1 km^{2} (0.386 sq mi or 247 acres) and river estuaries.

Cametours (French pronunciation: [kamtuʁ]) is a commune in the Manche department in Normandy in north-western France.

== See also ==
- Communes of the Manche department
