= Ouville =

- Commune
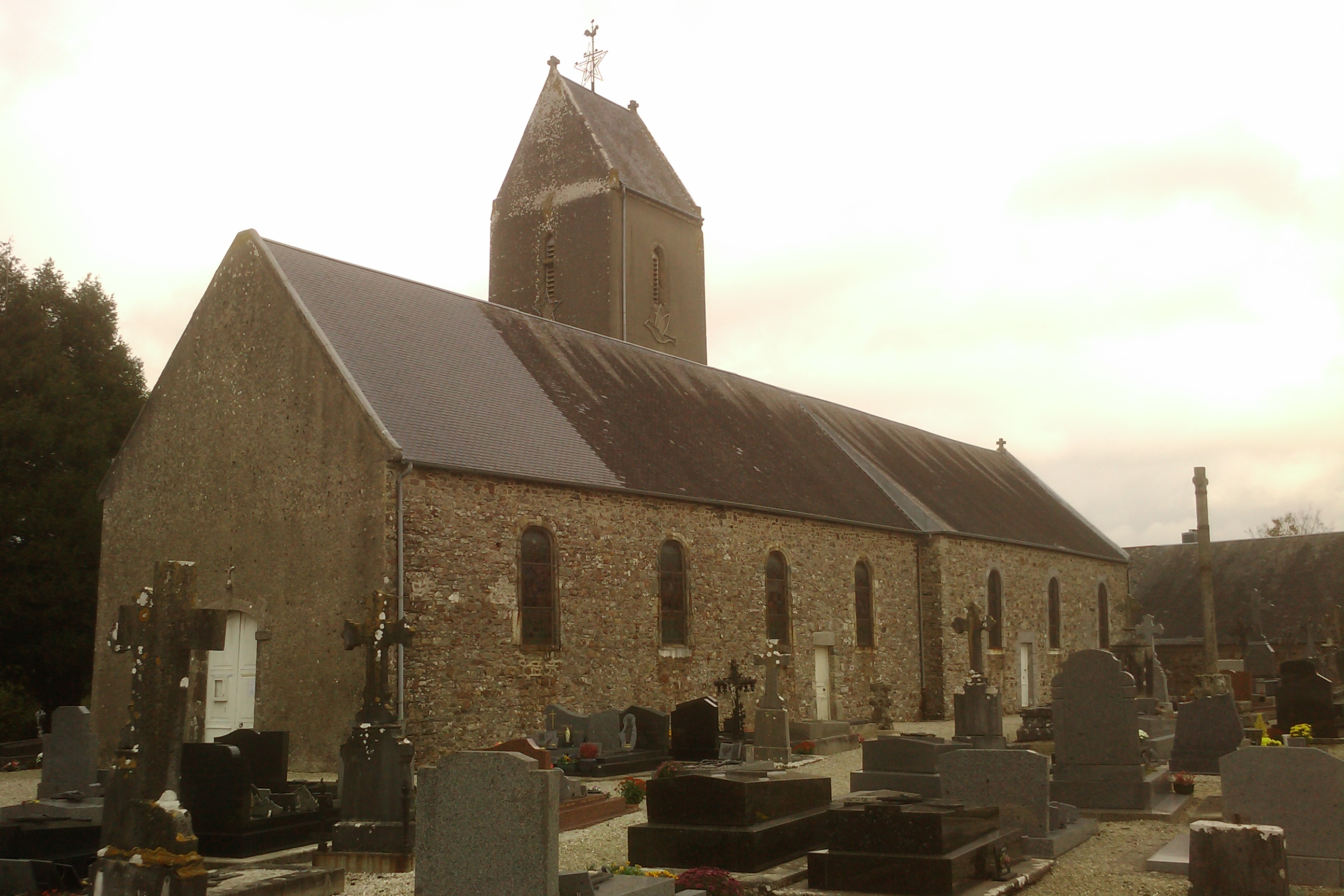
- The church of Notre-Dame
- Location of Ouville
- Location within France Location within Normandy
- Coordinates: 49°01′12″N 1°21′40″W
- Country: France
- Region: Normandy
- Department: Manche
- Arrondissement: Coutances
- Canton: Quettreville-sur-Sienne
- Intercommunality: Coutances Mer et Bocage

Government
  - Mayor (2020–2026): Daniel Lefranc
- Area^{1}: 11.20 km^{2} (4.32 sq mi)
- Elevation: 103 m (338 ft)
- Highest elevation: 121 m (397 ft)
- Lowest elevation: 29 m (95 ft)
- Population (2023): 439
  - Density: 39.2/km^{2} (102/sq mi)
- Time zone: UTC+01:00 (CET)
  - Summer (DST): UTC+02:00 (CEST)
- INSEE/Postal code: 50389 /50210
- ^{1} French Land Register data, which excludes lakes, ponds, glaciers > 1 km^{2} (0.386 sq mi or 247 acres) and river estuaries.

Ouville (French pronunciation: [uvil]) is a commune in the Manche department in Normandy in north-western France.

== History ==
Ouf's farm. Ouf from the Norse Ulfr (wolf), which survives in the Norman surname Ouf, common in the region of le Havre.

== Heraldry ==
Arms of Ouville	The arms of Ouville are blazoned : Argent, a latin cross between to fleurs de lys azure.

== See also ==
- Communes of the Manche department
