= Saint-Denis-le-Vêtu =

- Commune
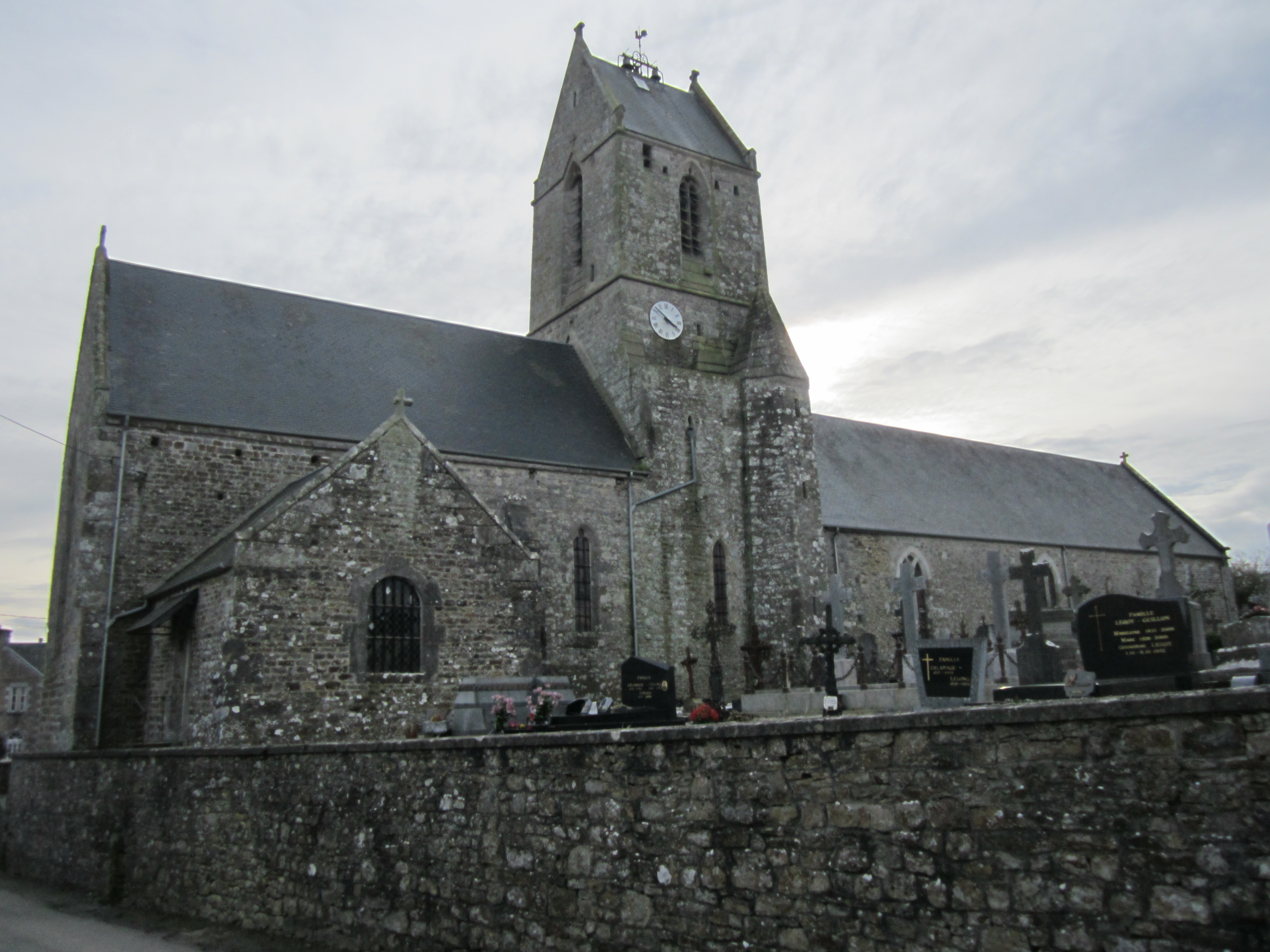
- The church of Saint Denis
- Location of Saint-Denis-le-Vêtu
- Location within France Location within Normandy
- Coordinates: 48°59′12″N 1°24′07″W
- Country: France
- Region: Normandy
- Department: Manche
- Arrondissement: Coutances
- Canton: Quettreville-sur-Sienne
- Intercommunality: Coutances Mer et Bocage

Government
  - Mayor (2020–2026): Claude Hennequin
- Area^{1}: 14.08 km^{2} (5.44 sq mi)
- Elevation: 50 m (160 ft)
- Highest elevation: 121 m (397 ft)
- Lowest elevation: 20 m (66 ft)
- Population (2023): 590
  - Density: 42/km^{2} (110/sq mi)
- Time zone: UTC+01:00 (CET)
  - Summer (DST): UTC+02:00 (CEST)
- INSEE/Postal code: 50464 /50210
- ^{1} French Land Register data, which excludes lakes, ponds, glaciers > 1 km^{2} (0.386 sq mi or 247 acres) and river estuaries.

Saint-Denis-le-Vêtu (French pronunciation: [sɛ̃ dəni lə vɛty]) is a commune in the Manche department in Normandy in north-western France.

== See also ==
- Communes of the Manche department
