= Ver, Manche =

Ver
- Commune
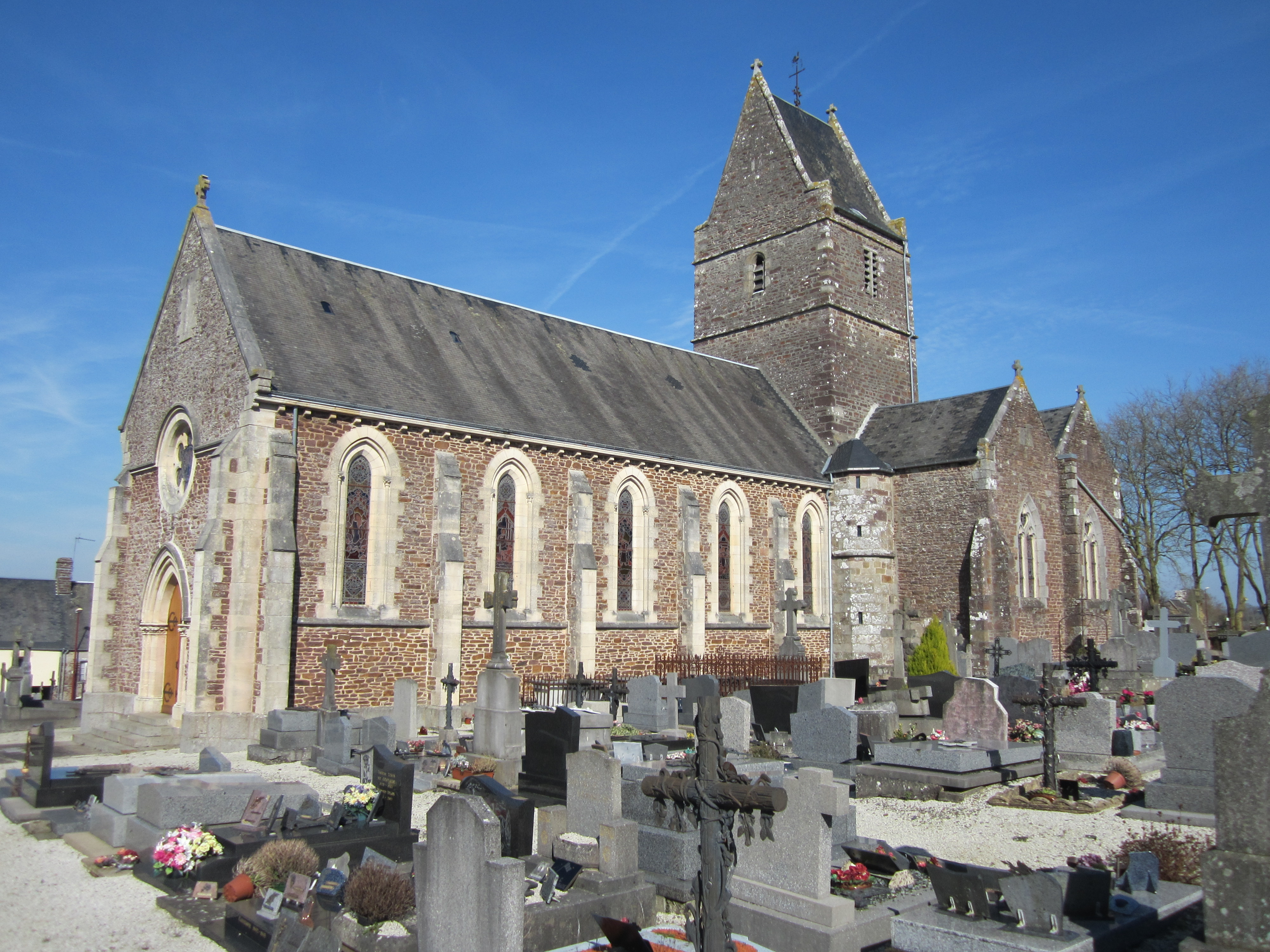
- Notre-Dame church
- Location of Ver
- Location within France Location within Normandy
- Coordinates: 48°53′41″N 1°23′30″W
- Country: France
- Region: Normandy
- Department: Manche
- Arrondissement: Coutances
- Canton: Quettreville-sur-Sienne
- Intercommunality: Coutances Mer et Bocage

Government
  - Mayor (2020–2026): Marc Jouanne
- Area^{1}: 13.27 km^{2} (5.12 sq mi)
- Elevation: 50 m (160 ft)
- Highest elevation: 118 m (387 ft)
- Lowest elevation: 20 m (66 ft)
- Population (2023): 386
  - Density: 29.1/km^{2} (75.3/sq mi)
- Time zone: UTC+01:00 (CET)
  - Summer (DST): UTC+02:00 (CEST)
- INSEE/Postal code: 50626 /50450
- ^{1} French Land Register data, which excludes lakes, ponds, glaciers > 1 km^{2} (0.386 sq mi or 247 acres) and river estuaries.

Ver (French pronunciation: [vɛʁ]) is a commune in the Manche department in Normandy in north-western France.

== See also ==
- Communes of the Manche department
- House of de Vere
