= La Baleine =

- Commune
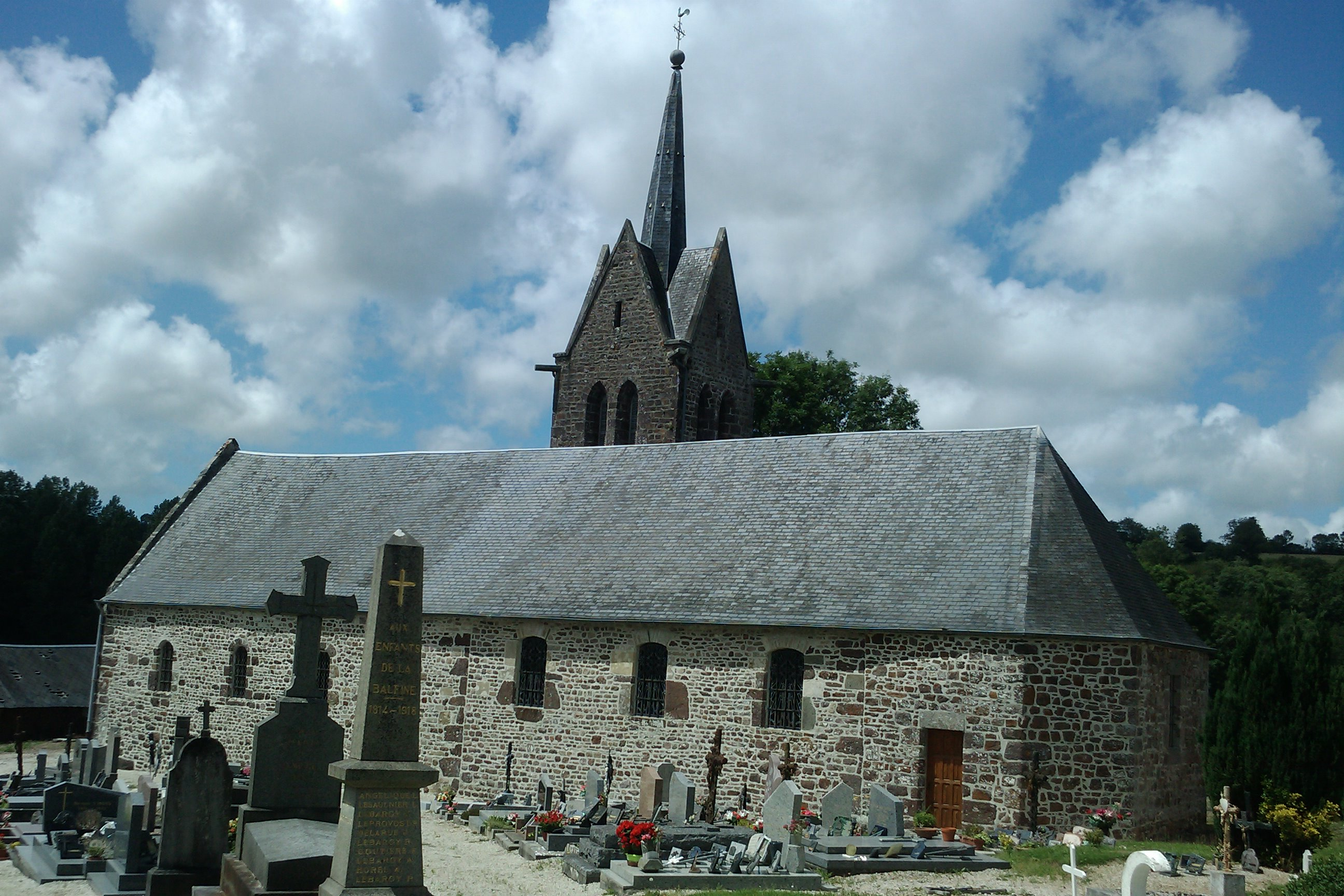
- Saint-Pierre church
- Location of La Baleine
- Location within France Location within Normandy
- Coordinates: 48°55′31″N 1°19′00″W
- Country: France
- Region: Normandy
- Department: Manche
- Arrondissement: Coutances
- Canton: Quettreville-sur-Sienne
- Intercommunality: Coutances Mer et Bocage

Government
  - Mayor (2020–2026): Justine Lebouteiller
- Area^{1}: 4.13 km^{2} (1.59 sq mi)
- Highest elevation: 171 m (561 ft)
- Lowest elevation: 37 m (121 ft)
- Population (2023): 105
  - Density: 25.4/km^{2} (65.8/sq mi)
- Time zone: UTC+01:00 (CET)
  - Summer (DST): UTC+02:00 (CEST)
- INSEE/Postal code: 50028 /50450
- ^{1} French Land Register data, which excludes lakes, ponds, glaciers > 1 km^{2} (0.386 sq mi or 247 acres) and river estuaries.

La Baleine (French pronunciation: [la balɛn]) is a commune in the Manche department in the Normandy region in northwestern France.

== Population ==
Historical population
| Year | Pop. | ±% p.a. |
|---|---|---|
| 1968 | 177 | — |
| 1975 | 153 | −2.06% |
| 1982 | 144 | −0.86% |
| 1990 | 121 | −2.15% |
| 1999 | 118 | −0.28% |
| 2007 | 92 | −3.06% |
| 2012 | 98 | +1.27% |
| 2017 | 91 | −1.47% |
| 2023 | 105 | +2.41% |
Source: INSEE

== See also ==
- Communes of the Manche department
