= Hambye =

- Commune
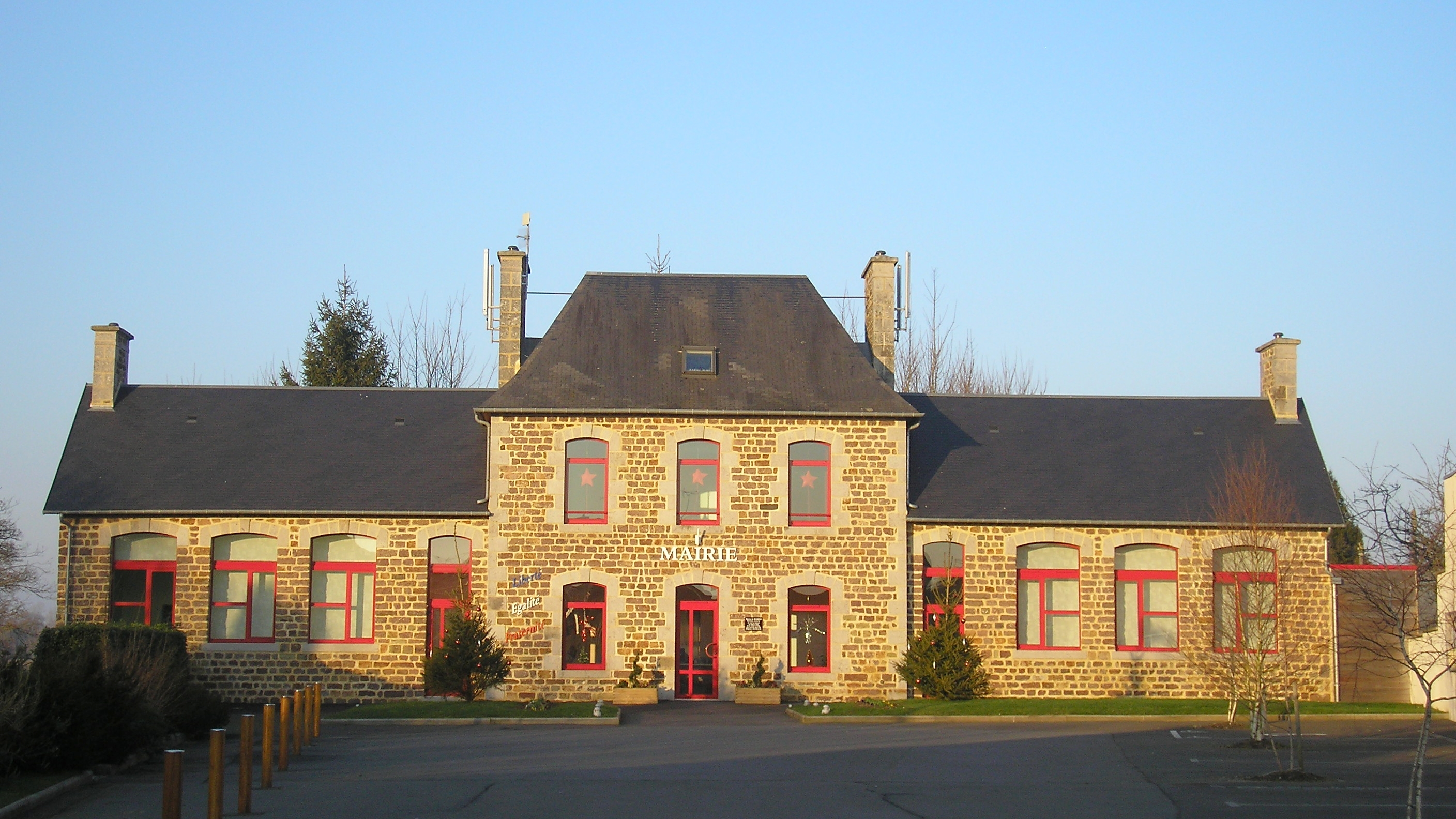
- Town hall

- Coat of arms
- Location of Hambye
- Location within France Location within Normandy
- Coordinates: 48°56′52″N 1°15′52″W
- Country: France
- Region: Normandy
- Department: Manche
- Arrondissement: Coutances
- Canton: Quettreville-sur-Sienne
- Intercommunality: Coutances Mer et Bocage

Government
  - Mayor (2024–2026): Victorien Pignet
- Area^{1}: 29.57 km^{2} (11.42 sq mi)
- Elevation: 89 m (292 ft)
- Highest elevation: 166 m (545 ft)
- Lowest elevation: 47 m (154 ft)
- Population (2023): 1,072
  - Density: 36.25/km^{2} (93.89/sq mi)
- Demonym: Hambions or Hambyons
- Time zone: UTC+01:00 (CET)
  - Summer (DST): UTC+02:00 (CEST)
- INSEE/Postal code: 50228 /50450
- ^{1} French Land Register data, which excludes lakes, ponds, glaciers > 1 km^{2} (0.386 sq mi or 247 acres) and river estuaries.

Hambye (French pronunciation: [ɑ̃bi]) is a commune in the Manche department in northwestern France. Its inhabitants are called Hambion(ne)s or Hambyon(ne)s in French.

The commune is twinned with the village of Lacey Green in Buckinghamshire, England.

== Heraldry ==
Arms of Hambye	The arms of Hambye are blazoned : Or, 2 fesses azure between 9 martlets in orle gules.

== See also ==
- Communes of the Manche department
