= Le Mesnil-Villeman =

- Commune
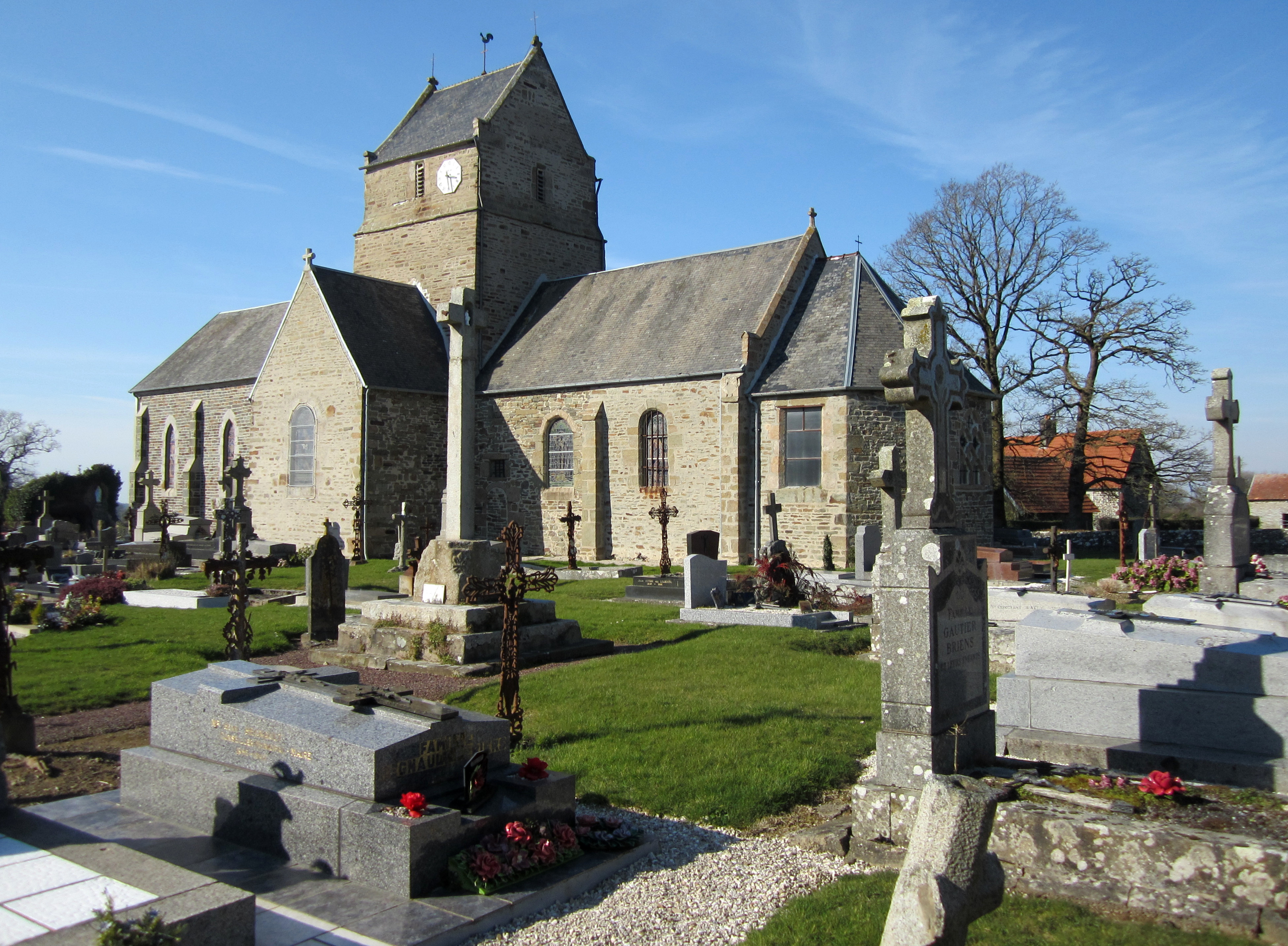
- The church of Saint-Pierre

- Coat of arms
- Location of Le Mesnil-Villeman
- Location within France Location within Normandy
- Coordinates: 48°51′55″N 1°19′35″W
- Country: France
- Region: Normandy
- Department: Manche
- Arrondissement: Coutances
- Canton: Quettreville-sur-Sienne
- Intercommunality: Coutances Mer et Bocage

Government
  - Mayor (2020–2026): Hervé Agnes
- Area^{1}: 10.80 km^{2} (4.17 sq mi)
- Elevation: 150 m (490 ft)
- Highest elevation: 164 m (538 ft)
- Lowest elevation: 42 m (138 ft)
- Population (2023): 238
  - Density: 22.0/km^{2} (57.1/sq mi)
- Time zone: UTC+01:00 (CET)
  - Summer (DST): UTC+02:00 (CEST)
- INSEE/Postal code: 50326 /50450
- Website: lemesnilvilleman.sitego.fr
- ^{1} French Land Register data, which excludes lakes, ponds, glaciers > 1 km^{2} (0.386 sq mi or 247 acres) and river estuaries.

Le Mesnil-Villeman (French pronunciation: [lə mɛnil vilmɑ̃]) is a commune in the Manche department in Normandy in north-western France.

== See also ==
- Communes of the Manche department
