= Roncey =

- Commune
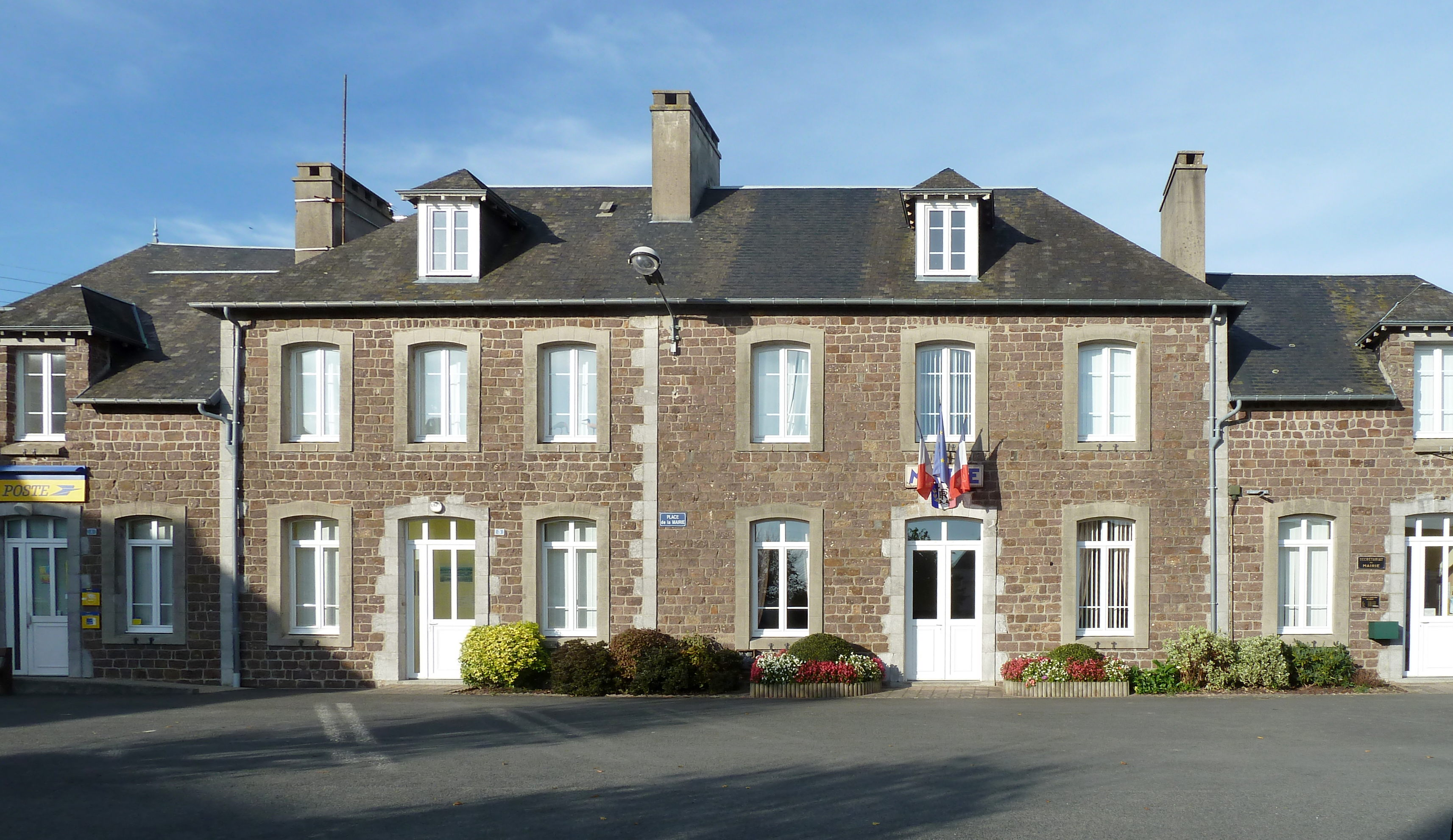
- The town hall
- Location of Roncey
- Location within France Location within Normandy
- Coordinates: 48°59′25″N 1°19′56″W
- Country: France
- Region: Normandy
- Department: Manche
- Arrondissement: Coutances
- Canton: Quettreville-sur-Sienne
- Intercommunality: Coutances Mer et Bocage

Government
  - Mayor (2020–2026): Alain Lechevallier
- Area^{1}: 12.15 km^{2} (4.69 sq mi)
- Elevation: 90 m (300 ft)
- Highest elevation: 131 m (430 ft)
- Lowest elevation: 33 m (108 ft)
- Population (2023): 770
  - Density: 63/km^{2} (160/sq mi)
- Demonym: Roncyais
- Time zone: UTC+01:00 (CET)
  - Summer (DST): UTC+02:00 (CEST)
- INSEE/Postal code: 50437 /50210
- ^{1} French Land Register data, which excludes lakes, ponds, glaciers > 1 km^{2} (0.386 sq mi or 247 acres) and river estuaries.

Roncey (French pronunciation: [ʁɔ̃sɛ]) is a commune in the Manche department in Normandy in north-western France.

== See also ==
- Communes of the Manche department
