= Saint-Martin-de-Cenilly =

- Commune
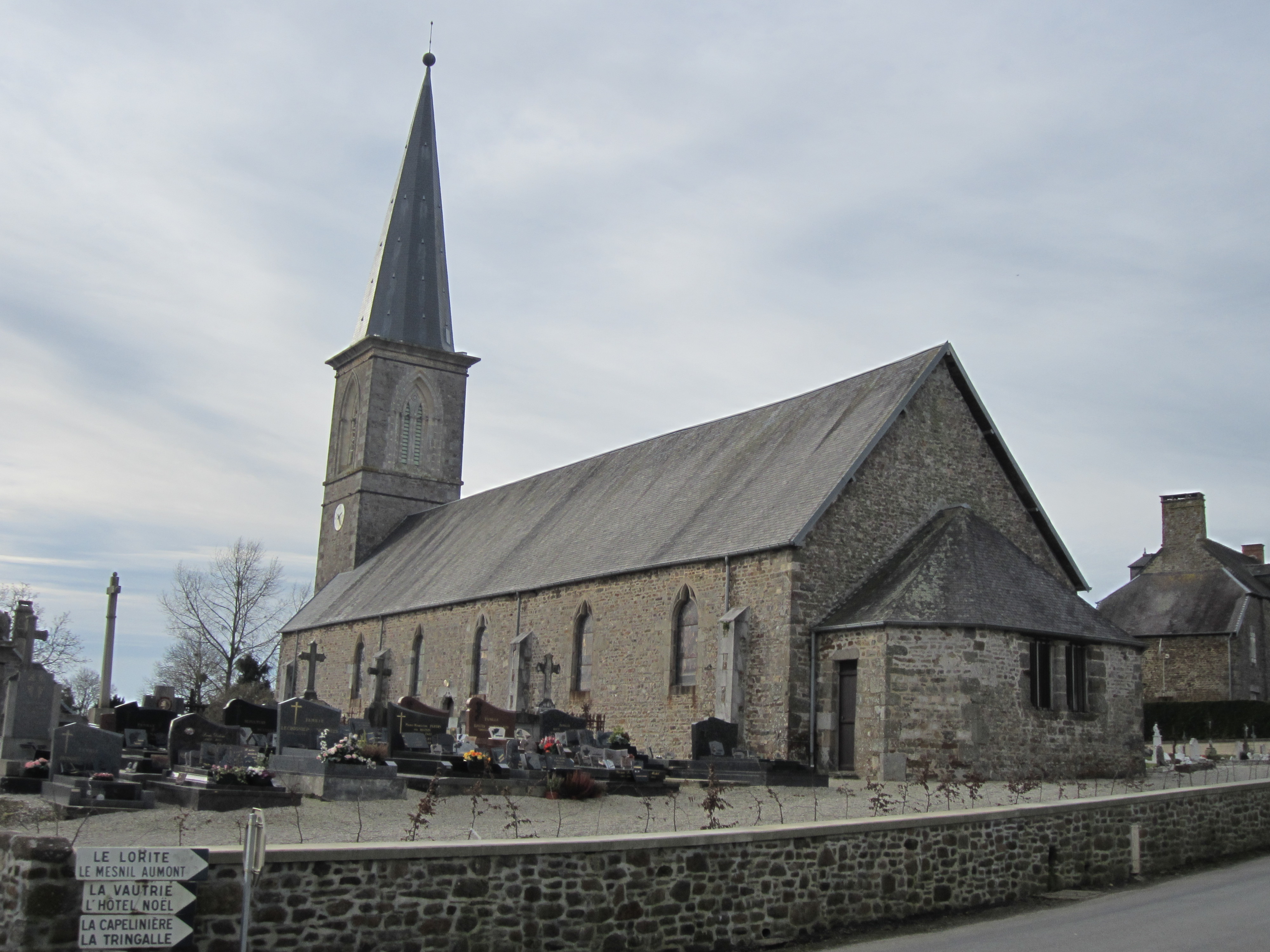
- The church of Saint-Martin
- Location of Saint-Martin-de-Cenilly
- Location within France Location within Normandy
- Coordinates: 48°58′59″N 1°16′49″W
- Country: France
- Region: Normandy
- Department: Manche
- Arrondissement: Coutances
- Canton: Quettreville-sur-Sienne

Government
  - Mayor (2020–2026): Noëlle Dudouit
- Area^{1}: 6.76 km^{2} (2.61 sq mi)
- Elevation: 119 m (390 ft)
- Highest elevation: 136 m (446 ft)
- Lowest elevation: 74 m (243 ft)
- Population (2023): 208
  - Density: 30.8/km^{2} (79.7/sq mi)
- Time zone: UTC+01:00 (CET)
  - Summer (DST): UTC+02:00 (CEST)
- INSEE/Postal code: 50513 /50210
- ^{1} French Land Register data, which excludes lakes, ponds, glaciers > 1 km^{2} (0.386 sq mi or 247 acres) and river estuaries.

Saint-Martin-de-Cenilly is a commune in the Manche department in Normandy in north-western France.

== See also ==
- Communes of the Manche department
