= Cerisy-la-Salle =

- Commune
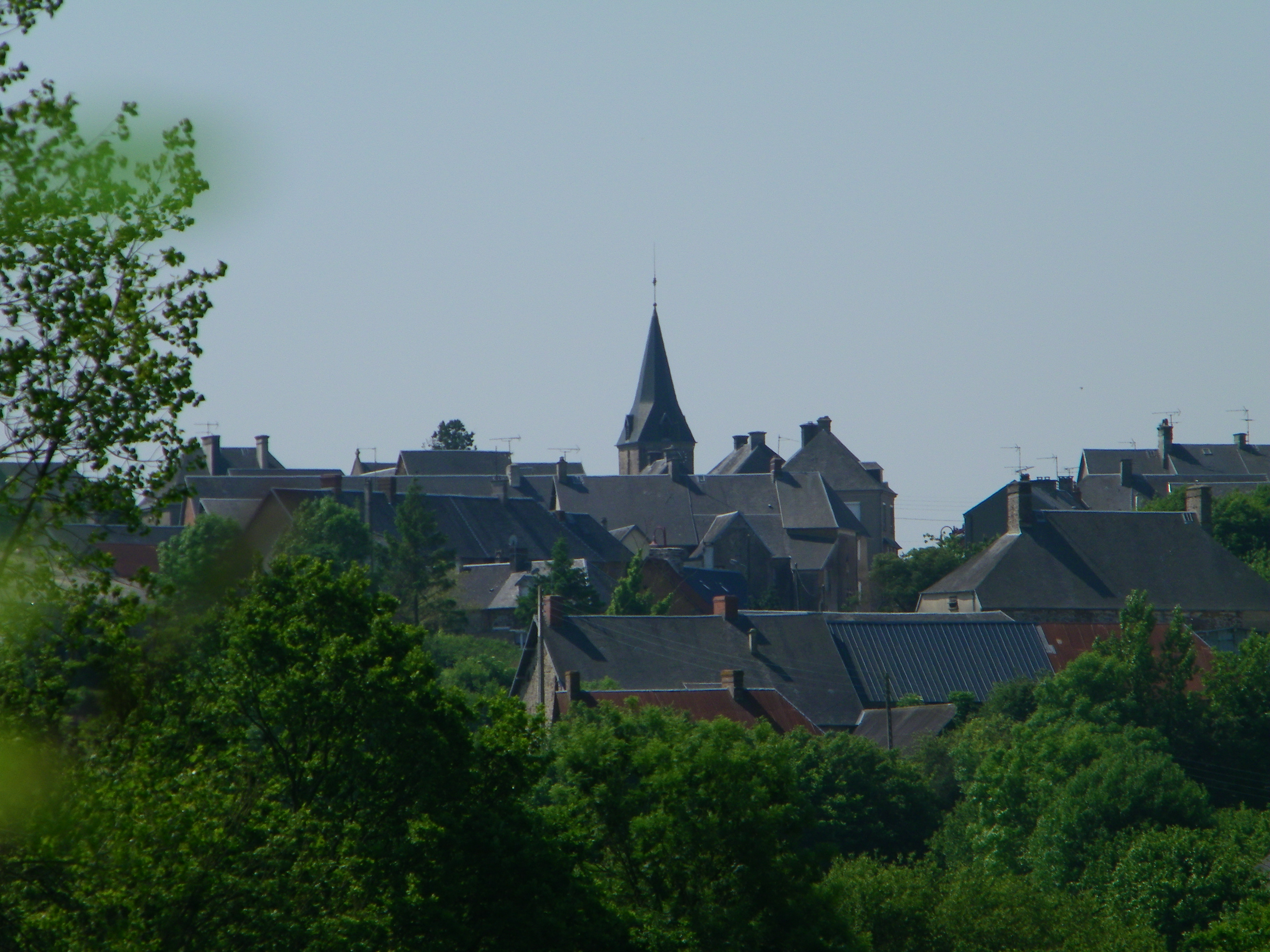
- Cerisy-la-Salle
- Location of Cerisy-la-Salle
- Location within France Location within Normandy
- Coordinates: 49°01′37″N 1°16′52″W
- Country: France
- Region: Normandy
- Department: Manche
- Arrondissement: Coutances
- Canton: Quettreville-sur-Sienne
- Intercommunality: Coutances Mer et Bocage

Government
  - Mayor (2020–2026): Patrick Outrequin
- Area^{1}: 16.86 km^{2} (6.51 sq mi)
- Elevation: 135 m (443 ft)
- Highest elevation: 169 m (554 ft)
- Lowest elevation: 58 m (190 ft)
- Population (2023): 1,005
  - Density: 59.61/km^{2} (154.4/sq mi)
- Time zone: UTC+01:00 (CET)
  - Summer (DST): UTC+02:00 (CEST)
- INSEE/Postal code: 50111 /50210
- ^{1} French Land Register data, which excludes lakes, ponds, glaciers > 1 km^{2} (0.386 sq mi or 247 acres) and river estuaries.

Cerisy-la-Salle (French pronunciation: [səʁizi la sal]) is a commune in the Manche department in Normandy in north-western France.

== Heraldry ==
Arms of Cerisy-la-Salle	The arms of Cerisy-la-Salle are blazoned : Vert, a bend cotissed argent, and in chief a lion passant Or.

== See also ==
- Centre culturel international de Cerisy-la-Salle
- Communes of the Manche department
