= Montmartin-sur-Mer =

- Commune
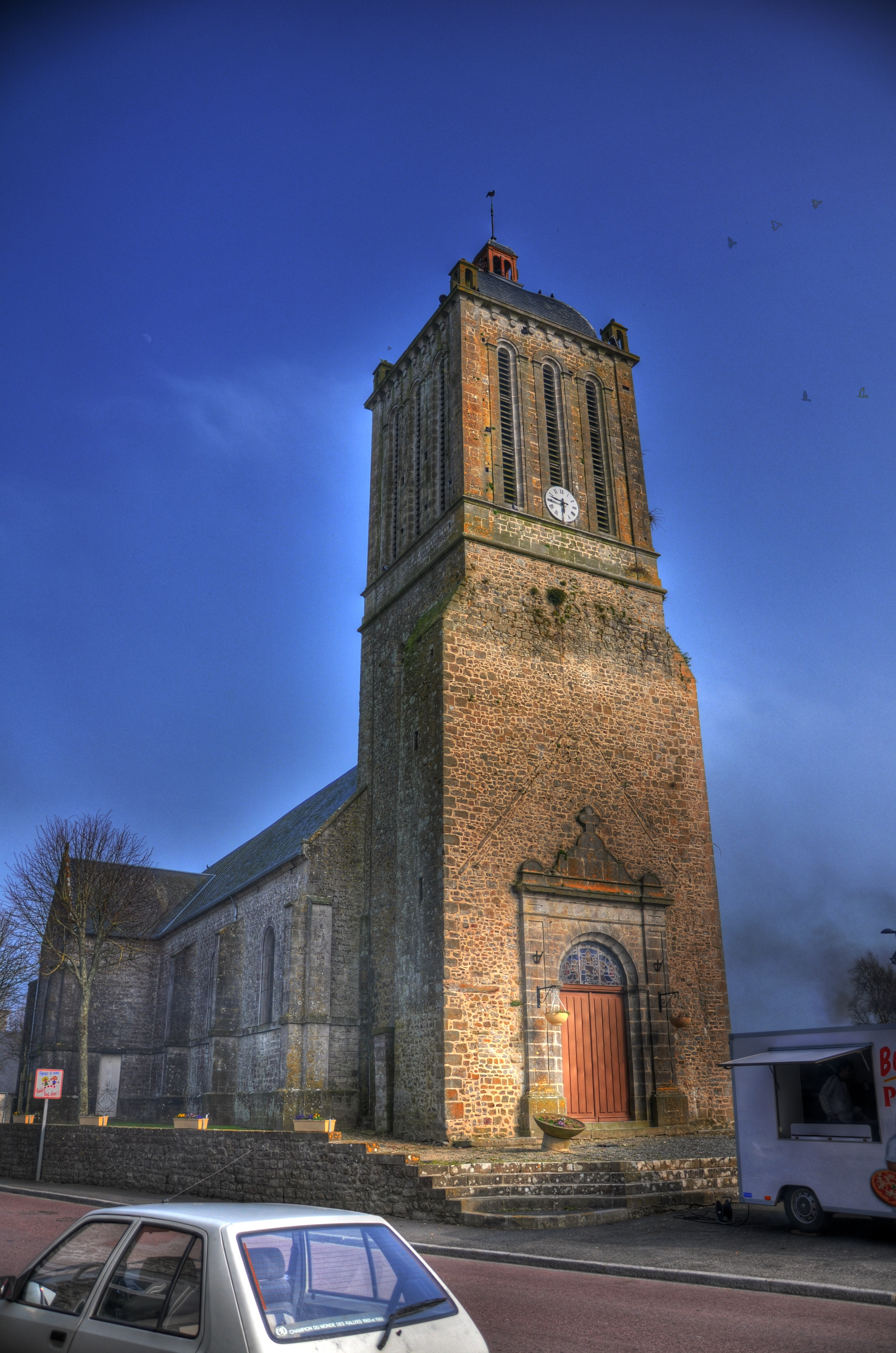
- The church
- Location of Montmartin-sur-Mer
- Location within France Location within Normandy
- Coordinates: 48°59′22″N 1°31′24″W
- Country: France
- Region: Normandy
- Department: Manche
- Arrondissement: Coutances
- Canton: Quettreville-sur-Sienne
- Intercommunality: Coutances Mer et Bocage

Government
  - Mayor (2020–2026): Bruno Quesnel
- Area^{1}: 9.81 km^{2} (3.79 sq mi)
- Elevation: 50 m (160 ft)
- Highest elevation: 60 m (200 ft)
- Lowest elevation: 2 m (6.6 ft)
- Population (2023): 1,425
  - Density: 145/km^{2} (376/sq mi)
- Time zone: UTC+01:00 (CET)
  - Summer (DST): UTC+02:00 (CEST)
- INSEE/Postal code: 50349 /50590
- ^{1} French Land Register data, which excludes lakes, ponds, glaciers > 1 km^{2} (0.386 sq mi or 247 acres) and river estuaries.

Montmartin-sur-Mer is a commune in the Manche department in Normandy in north-western France.

== See also ==
- History of this charming small Normandy seaside town and local artist Felix Planquette
- Communes of the Manche department
