= Hauteville-sur-Mer =

- Commune
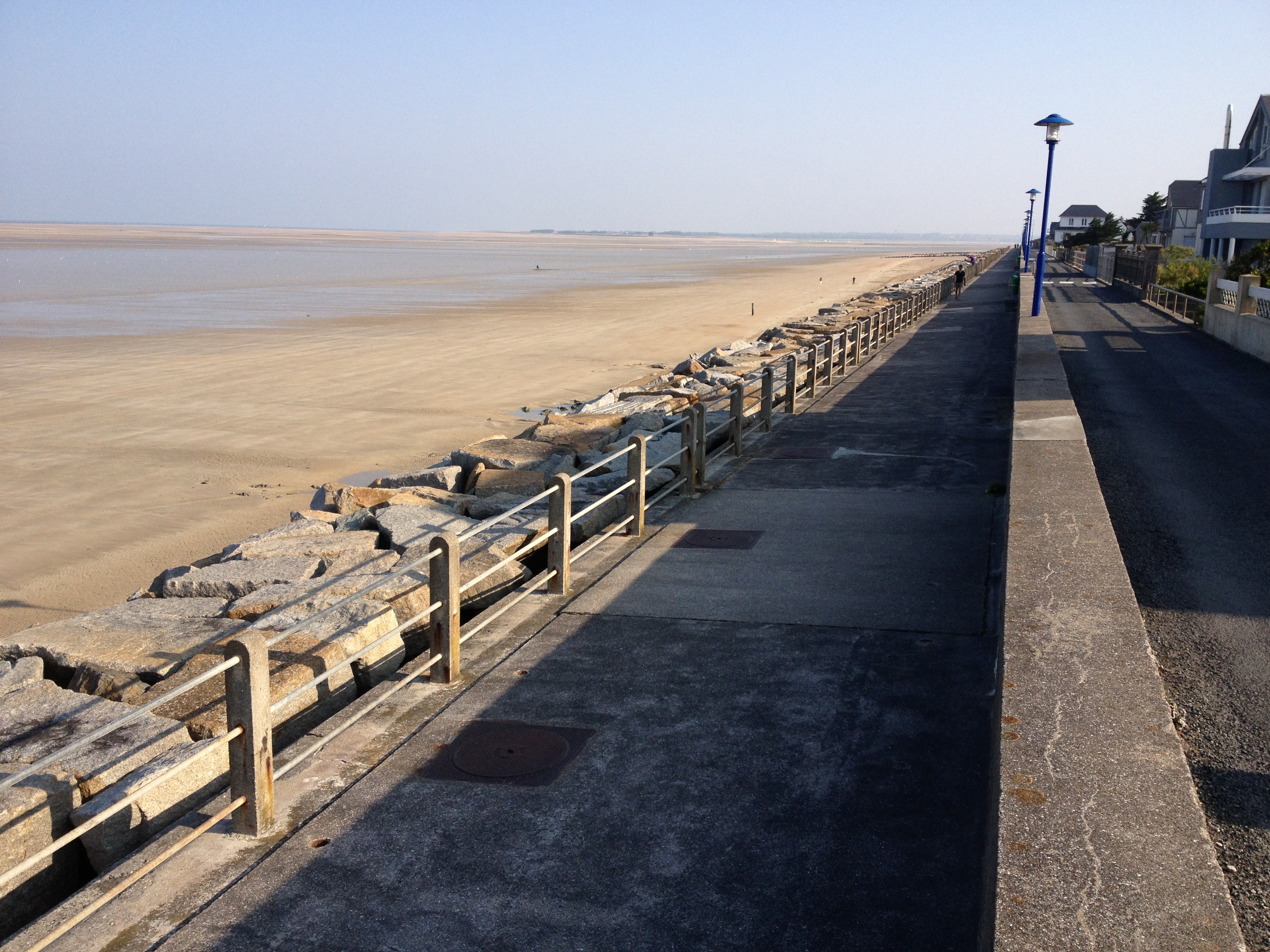
- The dam of Hauteville-sur-Mer Beach, a 1.7km long promenade
- Location of Hauteville-sur-Mer
- Location within France Location within Normandy
- Coordinates: 48°58′37″N 1°32′19″W
- Country: France
- Region: Normandy
- Department: Manche
- Arrondissement: Coutances
- Canton: Quettreville-sur-Sienne
- Intercommunality: Coutances Mer et Bocage

Government
  - Mayor (2020–2026): Jean-René Binet
- Area^{1}: 3.31 km^{2} (1.28 sq mi)
- Elevation: 20 m (66 ft)
- Highest elevation: 48 m (157 ft)
- Lowest elevation: 0 m (0 ft)
- Population (2023): 707
  - Density: 214/km^{2} (553/sq mi)
- Demonym: Hautais
- Time zone: UTC+01:00 (CET)
  - Summer (DST): UTC+02:00 (CEST)
- INSEE/Postal code: 50231 /50590
- ^{1} French Land Register data, which excludes lakes, ponds, glaciers > 1 km^{2} (0.386 sq mi or 247 acres) and river estuaries.

Hauteville-sur-Mer (French pronunciation: [otvil syʁ mɛʁ], literally Hauteville on Sea) is a commune in the Manche department in Normandy in north-western France.

== See also ==
- Communes of the Manche department
