= Belval, Manche =

Belval
- Commune
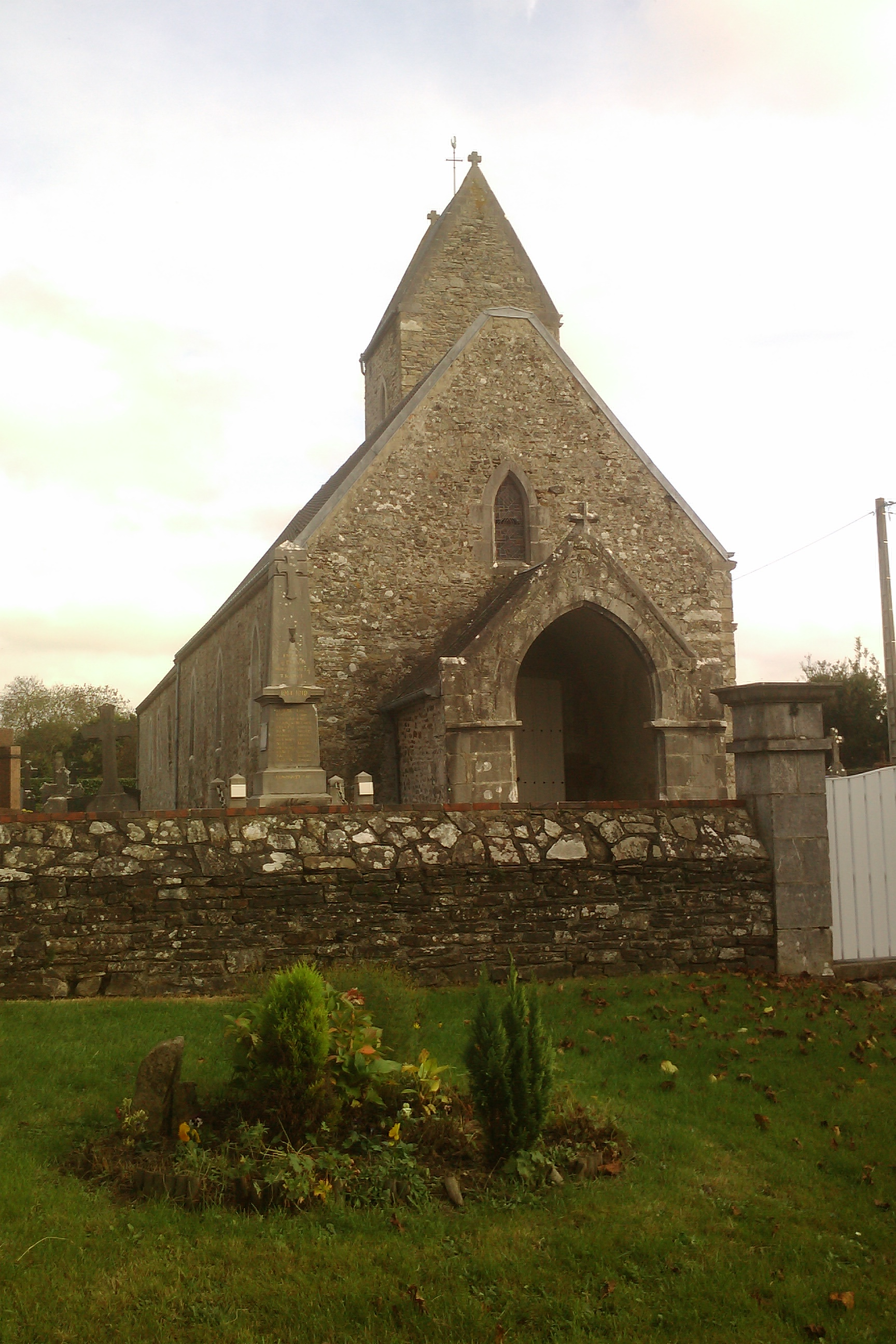
- The church of Saint-Martin

- Coat of arms
- Location of Belval
- Location within France Location within Normandy
- Coordinates: 49°02′25″N 1°21′45″W
- Country: France
- Region: Normandy
- Department: Manche
- Arrondissement: Coutances
- Canton: Quettreville-sur-Sienne

Government
  - Mayor (2020–2026): Serge Court
- Area^{1}: 5.72 km^{2} (2.21 sq mi)
- Elevation: 85 m (279 ft)
- Highest elevation: 145 m (476 ft)
- Lowest elevation: 32 m (105 ft)
- Population (2023): 333
  - Density: 58.2/km^{2} (151/sq mi)
- Time zone: UTC+01:00 (CET)
  - Summer (DST): UTC+02:00 (CEST)
- INSEE/Postal code: 50044 /50210
- ^{1} French Land Register data, which excludes lakes, ponds, glaciers > 1 km^{2} (0.386 sq mi or 247 acres) and river estuaries.

Belval (French pronunciation: [bɛlval]) is a commune in the Manche department in the Normandy region in northwestern France.

== Population ==
Historical population
Year	Pop.	±% p.a.
1968	290	—
1975	234	−3.02%
1982	253	+1.12%
1990	274	+1.00%
1999	274	+0.00%
2007	298	+1.06%
2012	302	+0.27%
2017	315	+0.85%
2023	333	+0.93%
Source: INSEE

== Heraldry ==
Arms of Belval	The arms of Belval are blazoned : Argent, a rose gules seeded Or slipped and leaved vert, chaussé vert.

== See also ==
- Communes of the Manche department
