= Le Mesnil-Garnier =

- Commune
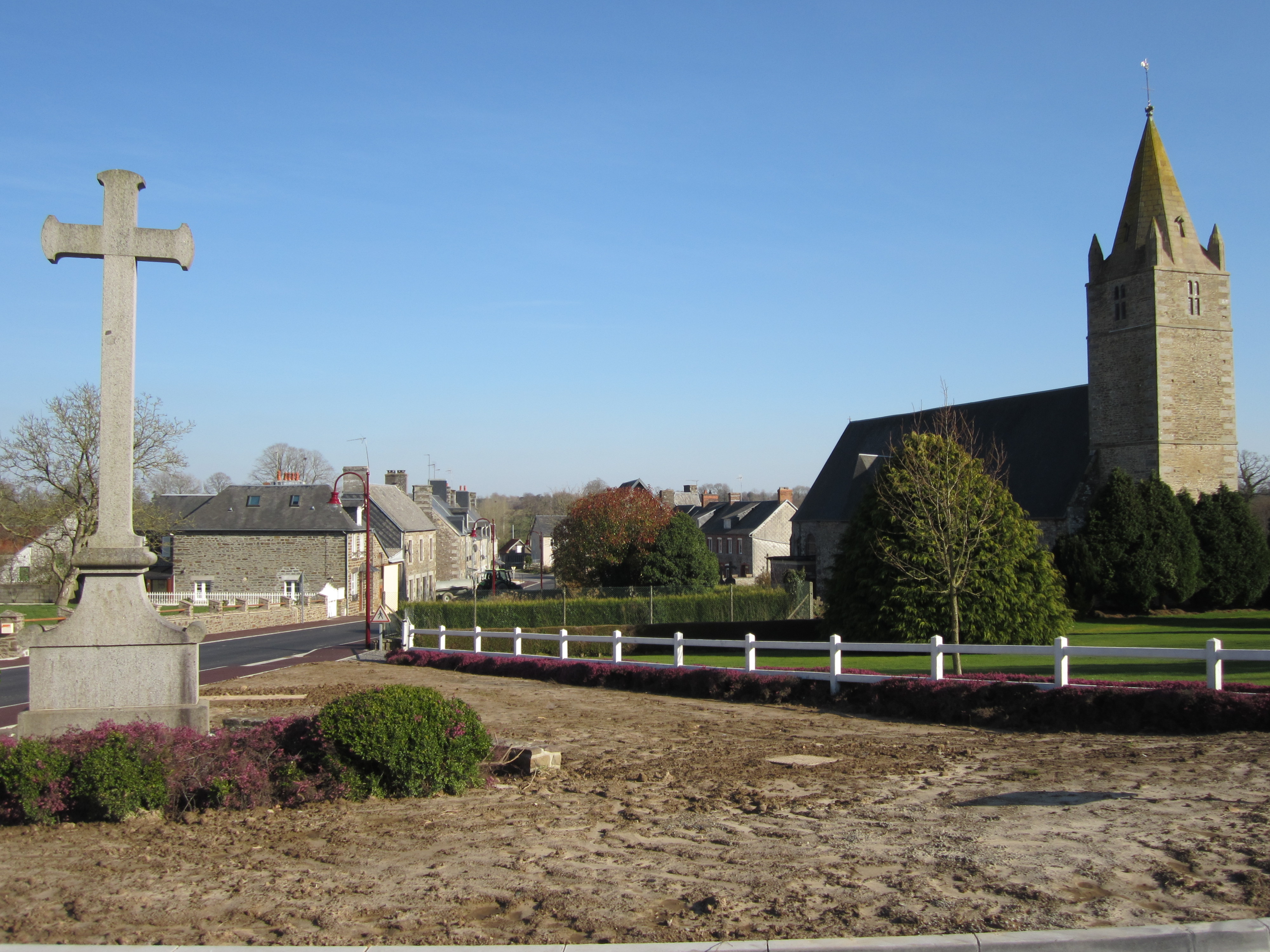
- View of the village from the entrance
- Location of Le Mesnil-Garnier
- Location within France Location within Normandy
- Coordinates: 48°51′57″N 1°18′30″W
- Country: France
- Region: Normandy
- Department: Manche
- Arrondissement: Coutances
- Canton: Quettreville-sur-Sienne
- Intercommunality: Coutances Mer et Bocage

Government
  - Mayor (2020–2026): Sylvie Lemoine
- Area^{1}: 10.41 km^{2} (4.02 sq mi)
- Elevation: 30 m (98 ft)
- Highest elevation: 166 m (545 ft)
- Lowest elevation: 73 m (240 ft)
- Population (2023): 220
  - Density: 21/km^{2} (55/sq mi)
- Time zone: UTC+01:00 (CET)
  - Summer (DST): UTC+02:00 (CEST)
- INSEE/Postal code: 50311 /50450
- ^{1} French Land Register data, which excludes lakes, ponds, glaciers > 1 km^{2} (0.386 sq mi or 247 acres) and river estuaries.

Le Mesnil-Garnier (French pronunciation: [lə mɛnil ɡaʁnje]) is a commune in the Manche department in Normandy in north-western France.

== See also ==
- Communes of the Manche department
