= Arrondissement of Coutances =

Coordinates: 49°03′07″N 1°27′01″W

Coutances
- Arrondissement
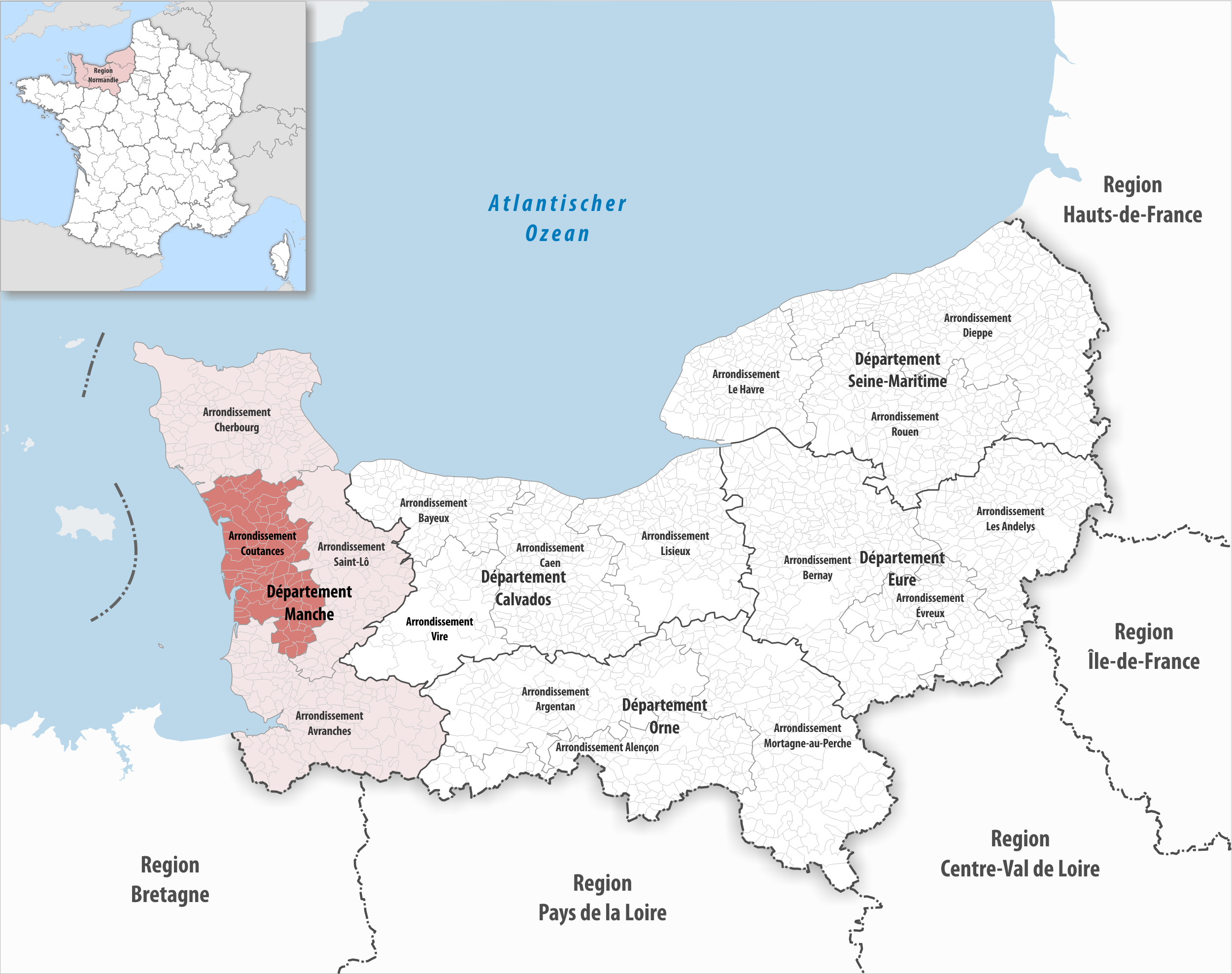
- Location within the region Normandy
- Country: France
- Region: Normandy
- Department: Manche
- No. of communes: {{{nbcomm}}}
- Area: 1,142.1 km^{2} (441.0 sq mi)
- Population (2023): 70,570
  - Density: 61.79/km^{2} (160.0/sq mi)
- INSEE code: 503

The arrondissement of Coutances is an arrondissement of France in the Manche department in the Normandy region. It has 80 communes. Its population is 70,454 (2021), and its area is 1,142.1 km^{2} (441.0 sq mi).

== Composition ==
The communes of the arrondissement of Coutances, and their INSEE codes, are:

1. Agon-Coutainville (50003)
2. Appeville (50016)
3. Auxais (50024)
4. La Baleine (50028)
5. Baupte (50036)
6. Belval (50044)
7. Blainville-sur-Mer (50058)
8. Brainville (50072)
9. Bretteville-sur-Ay (50078)
10. Bricqueville-la-Blouette (50084)
11. Cambernon (50092)
12. Cametours (50093)
13. Camprond (50094)
14. Cerisy-la-Salle (50111)
15. Courcy (50145)
16. Coutances (50147)
17. Créances (50151)
18. Doville (50166)
19. Feugères (50181)
20. La Feuillie (50182)
21. Gavray-sur-Sienne (50197)
22. Geffosses (50198)
23. Gonfreville (50208)
24. Gorges (50210)
25. Gouville-sur-Mer (50215)
26. Gratot (50219)
27. Grimesnil (50221)
28. Hambye (50228)
29. Hauteville-la-Guichard (50232)
30. Hauteville-sur-Mer (50231)
31. La Haye (50236)
32. Heugueville-sur-Sienne (50243)
33. Laulne (50265)
34. Lengronne (50266)
35. Lessay (50267)
36. Marchésieux (50289)
37. Le Mesnil-Garnier (50311)
38. Le Mesnil-Villeman (50326)
39. Millières (50328)
40. Montaigu-les-Bois (50336)
41. Montcuit (50340)
42. Monthuchon (50345)
43. Montmartin-sur-Mer (50349)
44. Montpinchon (50350)
45. Montsenelle (50273)
46. Muneville-le-Bingard (50364)
47. Nay (50368)
48. Neufmesnil (50372)
49. Nicorps (50376)
50. Notre-Dame-de-Cenilly (50378)
51. Orval-sur-Sienne (50388)
52. Ouville (50389)
53. Périers (50394)
54. Pirou (50403)
55. Le Plessis-Lastelle (50405)
56. Quettreville-sur-Sienne (50419)
57. Raids (50422)
58. Regnéville-sur-Mer (50429)
59. Roncey (50437)
60. Saint-Denis-le-Gast (50463)
61. Saint-Denis-le-Vêtu (50464)
62. Saint-Germain-sur-Ay (50481)
63. Saint-Germain-sur-Sèves (50482)
64. Saint-Malo-de-la-Lande (50506)
65. Saint-Martin-d'Aubigny (50510)
66. Saint-Martin-de-Cenilly (50513)
67. Saint-Nicolas-de-Pierrepont (50528)
68. Saint-Patrice-de-Claids (50533)
69. Saint-Pierre-de-Coutances (50537)
70. Saint-Sauveur-de-Pierrepont (50548)
71. Saint-Sauveur-Villages (50550)
72. Saint-Sébastien-de-Raids (50552)
73. Saussey (50568)
74. Savigny (50569)
75. Tourneville-sur-Mer (50272)
76. Tourville-sur-Sienne (50603)
77. Varenguebec (50617)
78. La Vendelée (50624)
79. Ver (50626)
80. Vesly (50629)

== History ==
The arrondissement of Coutances was created in 1800. At the January 2017 reorganisation of the arrondissements of Manche, it gained two communes from the arrondissement of Saint-Lô, and it lost 14 communes to the arrondissement of Avranches, two communes to the arrondissement of Cherbourg and one commune to the arrondissement of Saint-Lô.

As a result of the reorganisation of the cantons of France which came into effect in 2015, the borders of the cantons are no longer related to the borders of the arrondissements. The cantons of the arrondissement of Coutances were, as of January 2015:

1. Bréhal
2. Cerisy-la-Salle
3. Coutances
4. Gavray
5. La Haye-du-Puits
6. Lessay
7. Montmartin-sur-Mer
8. Périers
9. Saint-Malo-de-la-Lande
10. Saint-Sauveur-Lendelin
