= Canton of Quettreville-sur-Sienne =

Coordinates: 48.97°N 1.47°W

The canton of Quettreville-sur-Sienne is an administrative division of the Manche department, northwestern France. It was created at the French canton reorganisation which came into effect in March 2015. Its seat is in Quettreville-sur-Sienne.

It consists of the following communes:

1. La Baleine
2. Belval
3. Cametours
4. Cerisy-la-Salle
5. Gavray-sur-Sienne
6. Grimesnil
7. Hambye
8. Hauteville-sur-Mer
9. Lengronne
10. Le Mesnil-Garnier
11. Le Mesnil-Villeman
12. Montaigu-les-Bois
13. Montmartin-sur-Mer
14. Montpinchon
15. Notre-Dame-de-Cenilly
16. Ouville
17. Quettreville-sur-Sienne
18. Roncey
19. Saint-Denis-le-Gast
20. Saint-Denis-le-Vêtu
21. Saint-Martin-de-Cenilly
22. Savigny
23. Tourneville-sur-Mer
24. Ver
