= Saint-Aubin-du-Perron =

- Part of Saint-Sauveur-Villages
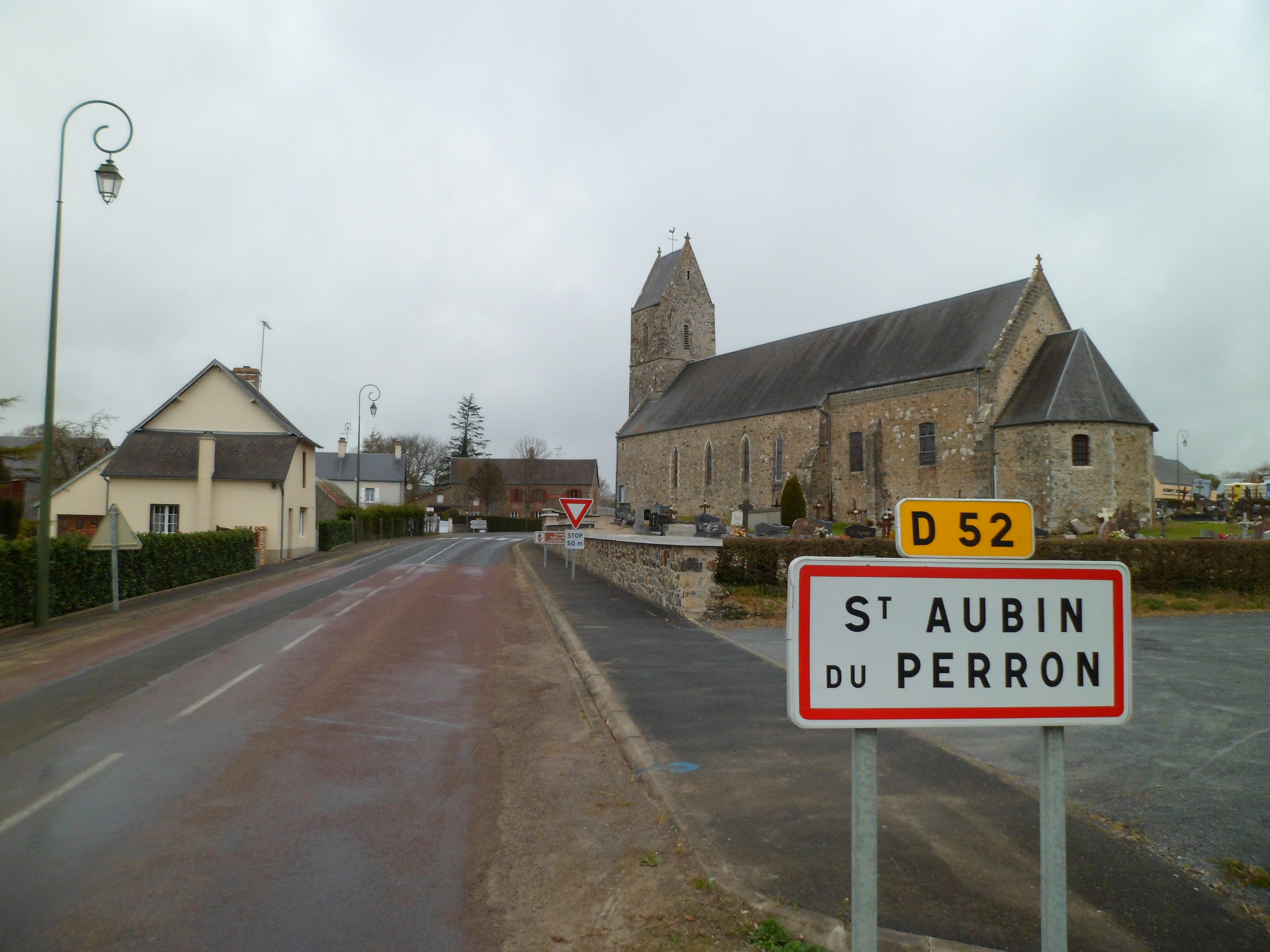
- Entrance to the village and the church of Saint-Aubin
- Location of Saint-Aubin-du-Perron
- Location within France Location within Normandy
- Coordinates: 49°09′09″N 1°22′26″W
- Country: France
- Region: Normandy
- Department: Manche
- Arrondissement: Coutances
- Canton: Agon-Coutainville
- Commune: Saint-Sauveur-Villages
- Area^{1}: 7.62 km^{2} (2.94 sq mi)
- Elevation: 84 m (276 ft)
- Highest elevation: 88 m (289 ft)
- Lowest elevation: 15 m (49 ft)
- Population (2022): 221
  - Density: 29.0/km^{2} (75.1/sq mi)
- Time zone: UTC+01:00 (CET)
  - Summer (DST): UTC+02:00 (CEST)
- Postal code: 50490
- ^{1} French Land Register data, which excludes lakes, ponds, glaciers > 1 km^{2} (0.386 sq mi or 247 acres) and river estuaries.

Saint-Aubin-du-Perron (French pronunciation: [sɛ̃.t‿obɛ̃ dy pɛʁɔ̃]) is a former commune in the Manche department in Normandy in north-western France. On 1 January 2019, it was merged into the new commune Saint-Sauveur-Villages. It has 221 inhabitants (2022). In 1823 it yielded a part of its territory for the creation of the commune Le Mesnilbus.

== See also ==
- Communes of the Manche department
