= La Ronde-Haye =

- Part of Saint-Sauveur-Villages
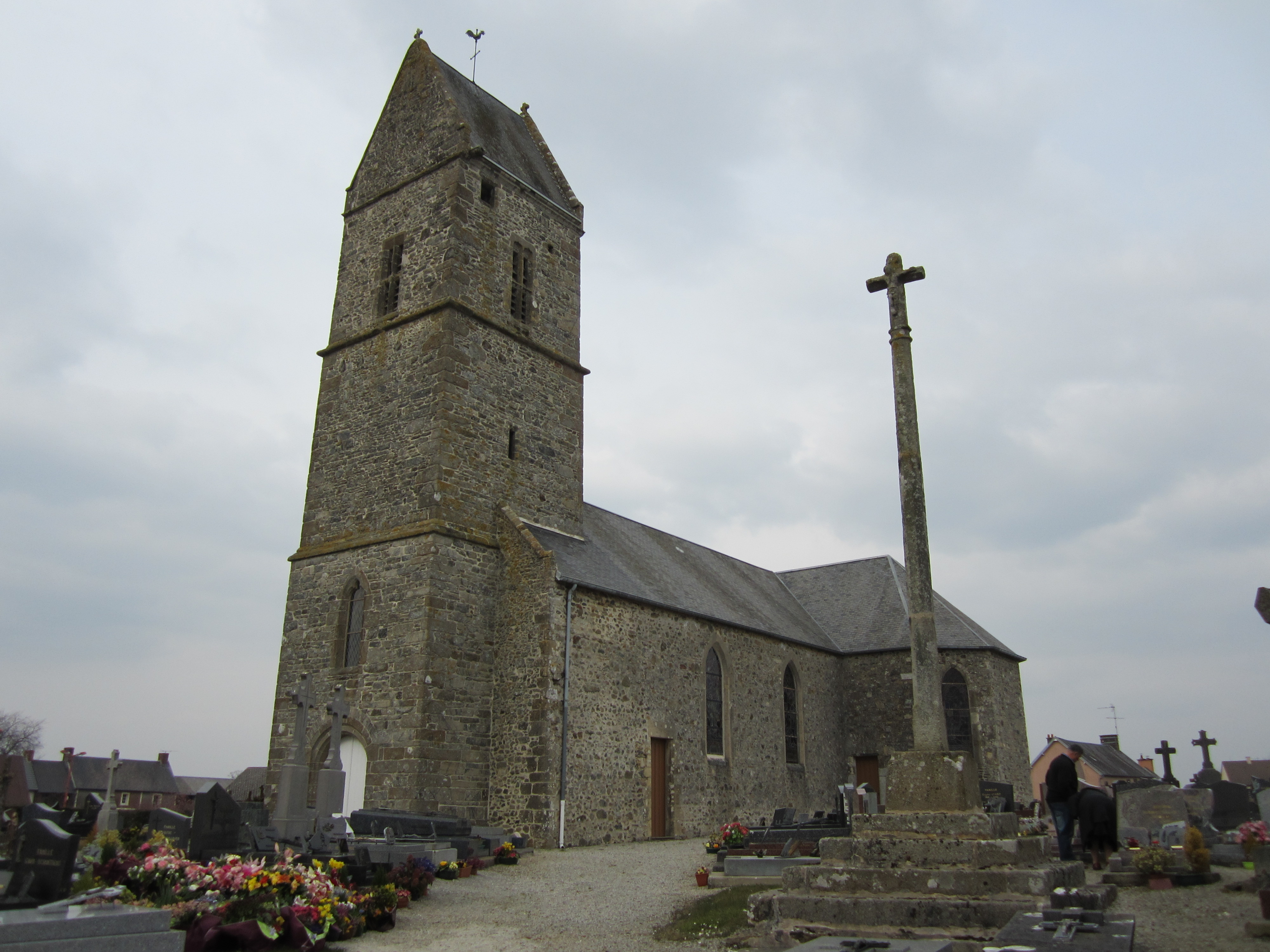
- The church of Notre-Dame
- Location of La Ronde-Haye
- Location within France Location within Normandy
- Coordinates: 49°07′38″N 1°26′24″W
- Country: France
- Region: Normandy
- Department: Manche
- Arrondissement: Coutances
- Canton: Agon-Coutainville
- Commune: Saint-Sauveur-Villages
- Area^{1}: 6.67 km^{2} (2.58 sq mi)
- Elevation: 58 m (190 ft)
- Highest elevation: 93 m (305 ft)
- Lowest elevation: 33 m (108 ft)
- Population (2022): 323
  - Density: 48.4/km^{2} (125/sq mi)
- Time zone: UTC+01:00 (CET)
  - Summer (DST): UTC+02:00 (CEST)
- Postal code: 50490
- ^{1} French Land Register data, which excludes lakes, ponds, glaciers > 1 km^{2} (0.386 sq mi or 247 acres) and river estuaries.

La Ronde-Haye (French pronunciation: [la ʁɔ̃d ɛ]) is a former commune in the Manche department in Normandy in north-western France. On 1 January 2019, it was merged into the new commune Saint-Sauveur-Villages.

== See also ==
- Communes of the Manche department
