= Anneville-sur-Mer =

- Part of Gouville-sur-Mer
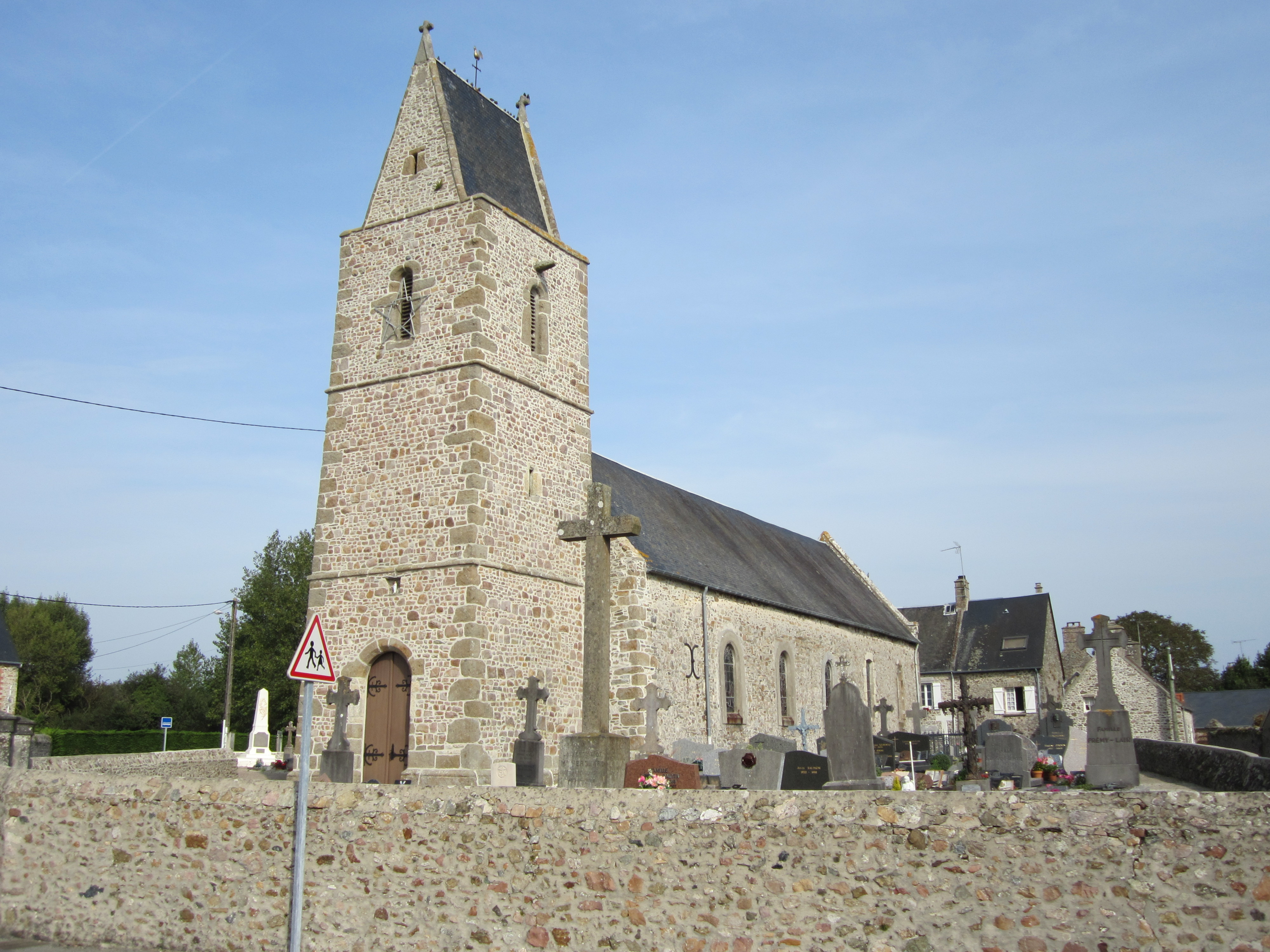
- The church of Saint-Samson
- Location of Anneville-sur-Mer
- Location within France Location within Normandy
- Coordinates: 49°07′09″N 1°34′45″W
- Country: France
- Region: Normandy
- Department: Manche
- Arrondissement: Coutances
- Canton: Agon-Coutainville
- Commune: Gouville-sur-Mer
- Area^{1}: 3.73 km^{2} (1.44 sq mi)
- Highest elevation: 16 m (52 ft)
- Lowest elevation: 0 m (0 ft)
- Population (2023): 248
  - Density: 66.5/km^{2} (172/sq mi)
- Time zone: UTC+01:00 (CET)
  - Summer (DST): UTC+02:00 (CEST)
- Postal code: 50560
- ^{1} French Land Register data, which excludes lakes, ponds, glaciers > 1 km^{2} (0.386 sq mi or 247 acres) and river estuaries.

Anneville-sur-Mer (French pronunciation: [anvil syʁ mɛʁ], literally Anneville on Sea) is a former commune in the Manche department in the Normandy region in northwestern France. On 1 January 2019, it was merged into the commune Gouville-sur-Mer.

== See also ==
- Communes of the Manche department
