= Saint-Sauveur-Lendelin =

- Part of Saint-Sauveur-Villages
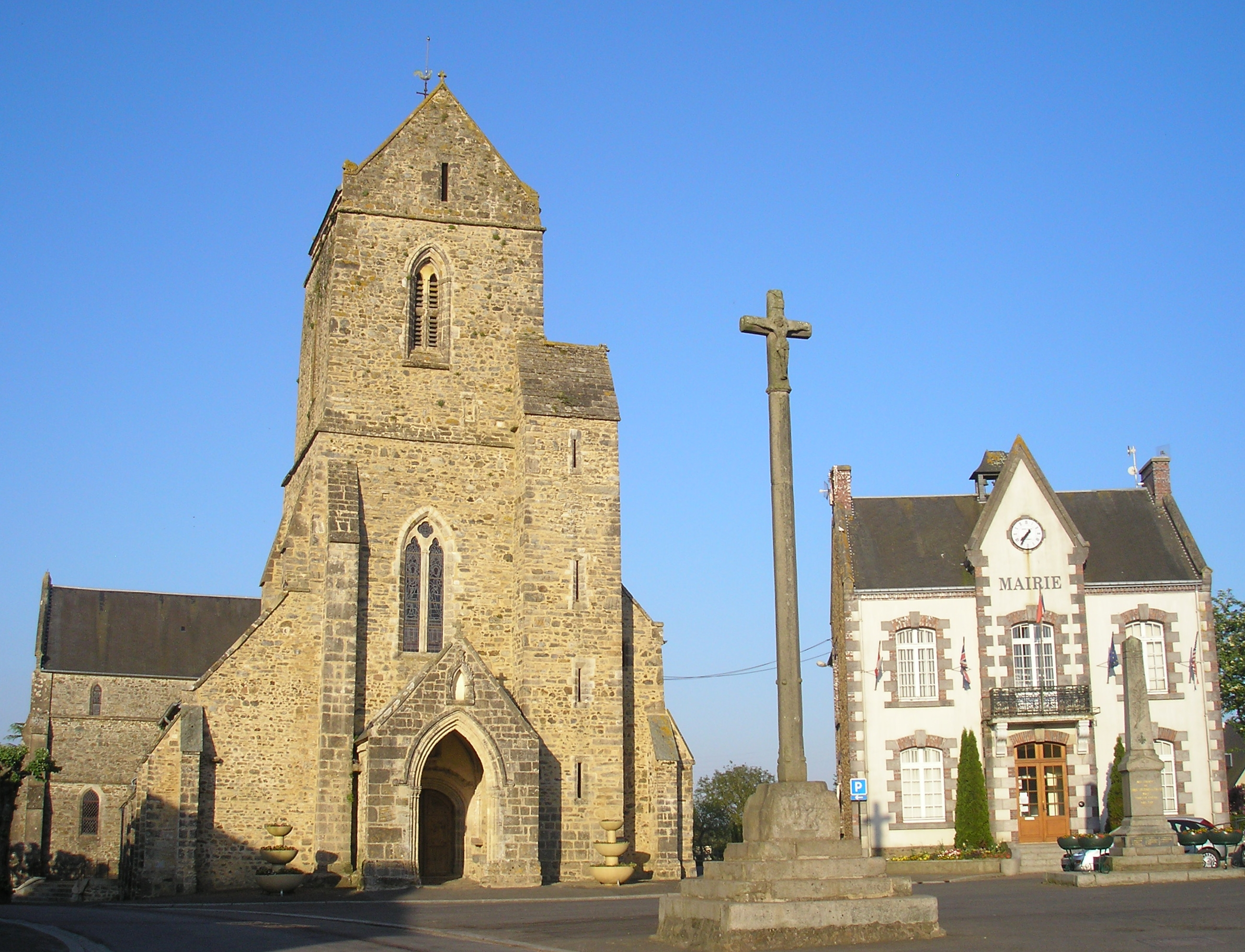
- The church of Saint-Laurent, the 1571 cross and the town hall
- Location of Saint-Sauveur-Lendelin
- Location within France Location within Normandy
- Coordinates: 49°07′52″N 1°24′44″W
- Country: France
- Region: Normandy
- Department: Manche
- Arrondissement: Coutances
- Canton: Agon-Coutainville
- Commune: Saint-Sauveur-Villages
- Area^{1}: 16.39 km^{2} (6.33 sq mi)
- Elevation: 65 m (213 ft)
- Highest elevation: 123 m (404 ft)
- Lowest elevation: 23 m (75 ft)
- Population (2022): 1,553
  - Density: 94.75/km^{2} (245.4/sq mi)
- Time zone: UTC+01:00 (CET)
  - Summer (DST): UTC+02:00 (CEST)
- Postal code: 50490
- ^{1} French Land Register data, which excludes lakes, ponds, glaciers > 1 km^{2} (0.386 sq mi or 247 acres) and river estuaries.

Saint-Sauveur-Lendelin (French pronunciation: [sɛ̃ sovœʁ lɑ̃dlɛ̃]) is a former commune in the Manche department in Normandy in north-western France. On 1 January 2019, it was merged into the new commune Saint-Sauveur-Villages.

== See also ==
- Communes of the Manche department
