= Montsurvent =

- Part of Gouville-sur-Mer
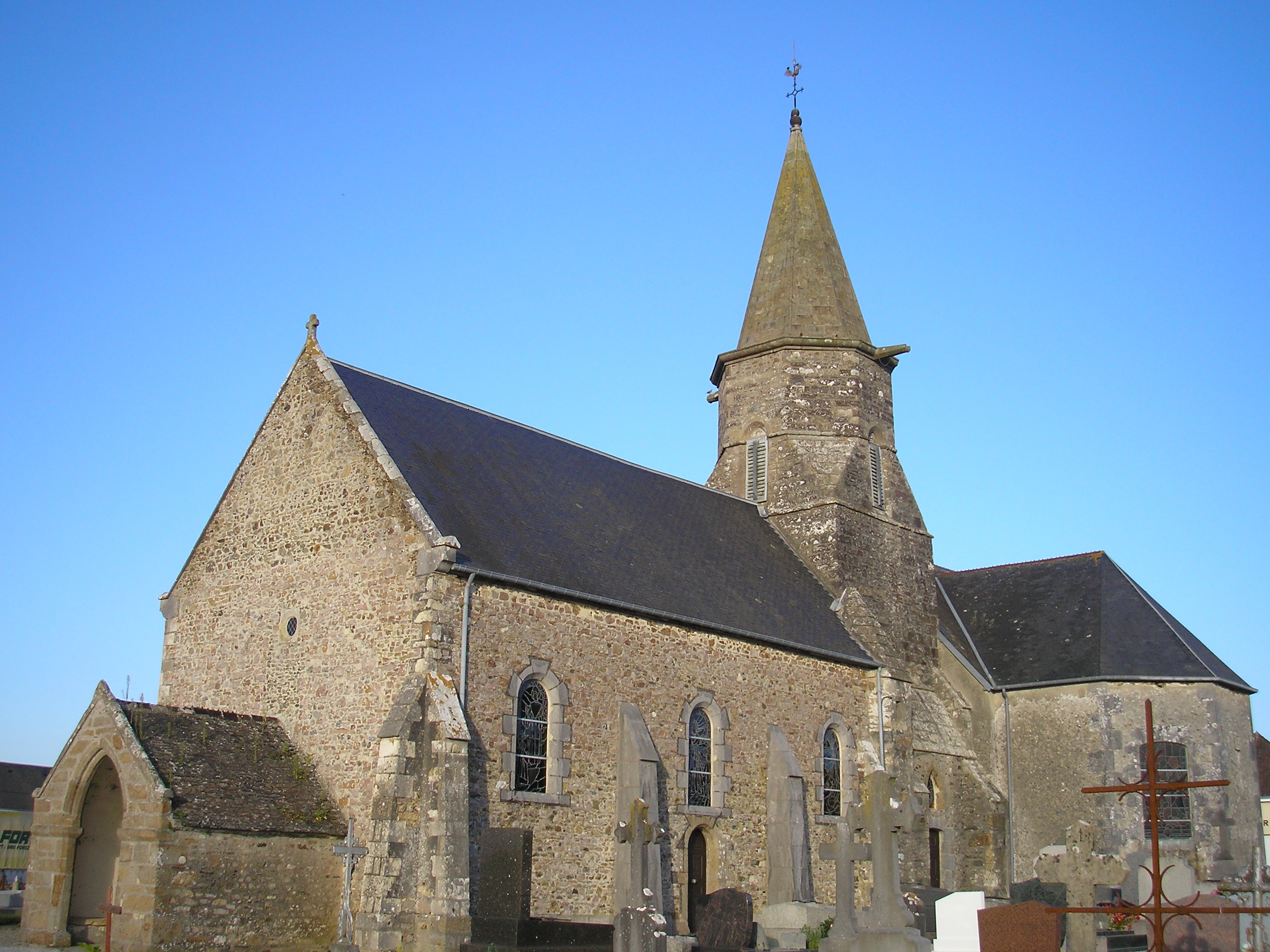
- The church of Saint-Martin
- Location of Montsurvent
- Location within France Location within Normandy
- Coordinates: 49°06′57″N 1°29′48″W
- Country: France
- Region: Normandy
- Department: Manche
- Arrondissement: Coutances
- Canton: Agon-Coutainville
- Commune: Gouville-sur-Mer
- Area^{1}: 8.33 km^{2} (3.22 sq mi)
- Elevation: 78 m (256 ft)
- Highest elevation: 88 m (289 ft)
- Lowest elevation: 31 m (102 ft)
- Population (2022): 434
  - Density: 52.1/km^{2} (135/sq mi)
- Time zone: UTC+01:00 (CET)
  - Summer (DST): UTC+02:00 (CEST)
- Postal code: 50200
- ^{1} French Land Register data, which excludes lakes, ponds, glaciers > 1 km^{2} (0.386 sq mi or 247 acres) and river estuaries.

Montsurvent (French pronunciation: [mɔ̃syʁvɑ̃]) is a former commune in the Manche department in Normandy in north-western France. On 1 January 2019, it was merged into the commune Gouville-sur-Mer.

== See also ==
- Communes of the Manche department
