= Saint-Michel-de-la-Pierre =

- Part of Saint-Sauveur-Villages
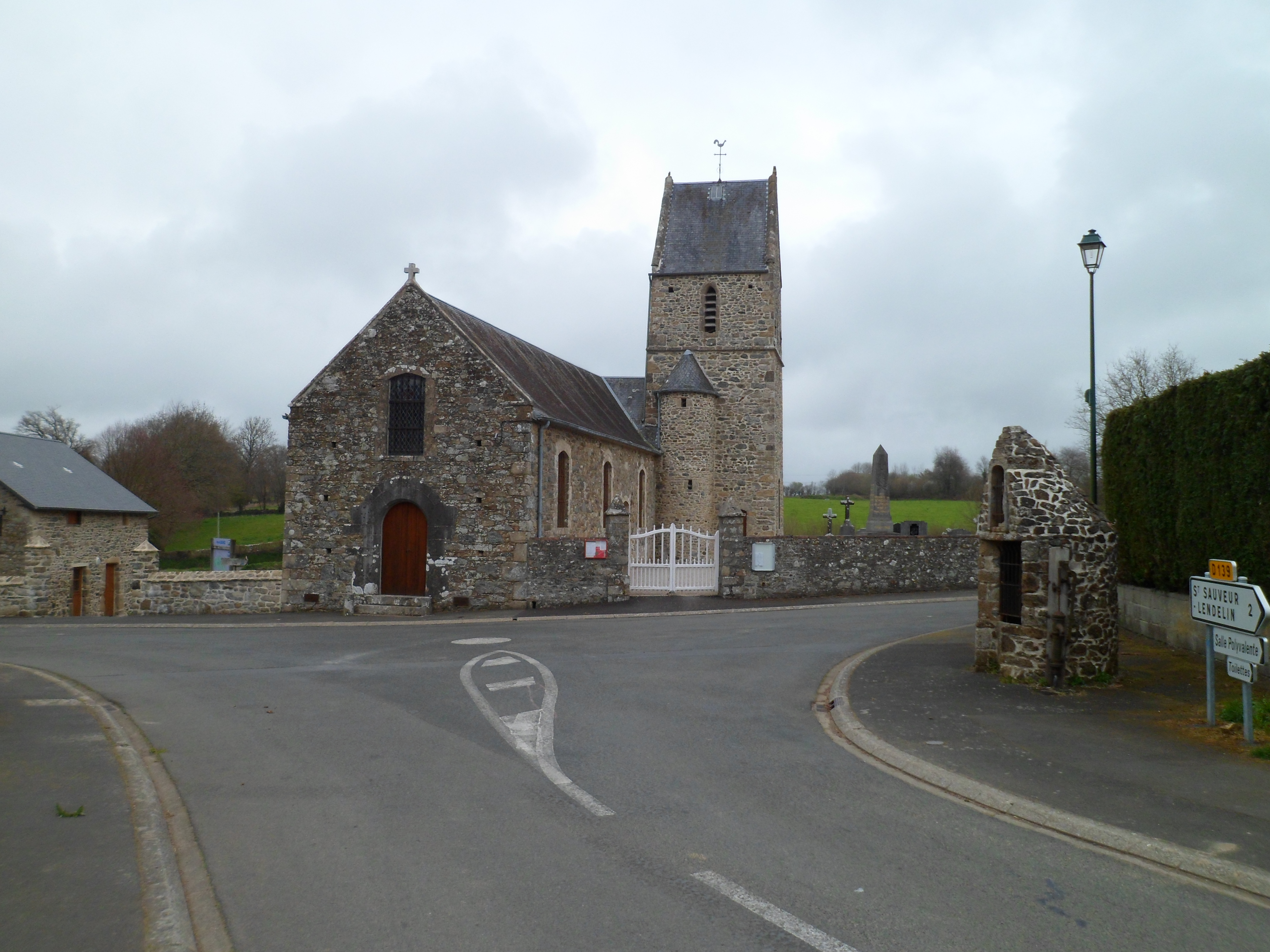
- The church of Saint-Michel
- Location of Saint-Michel-de-la-Pierre
- Location within France Location within Normandy
- Coordinates: 49°08′20″N 1°23′02″W
- Country: France
- Region: Normandy
- Department: Manche
- Arrondissement: Coutances
- Canton: Agon-Coutainville
- Commune: Saint-Sauveur-Villages
- Area^{1}: 4.25 km^{2} (1.64 sq mi)
- Elevation: 50 m (160 ft)
- Highest elevation: 109 m (358 ft)
- Lowest elevation: 25 m (82 ft)
- Population (2022): 185
  - Density: 43.5/km^{2} (113/sq mi)
- Time zone: UTC+01:00 (CET)
  - Summer (DST): UTC+02:00 (CEST)
- Postal code: 50490
- ^{1} French Land Register data, which excludes lakes, ponds, glaciers > 1 km^{2} (0.386 sq mi or 247 acres) and river estuaries.

Saint-Michel-de-la-Pierre (French pronunciation: [sɛ̃ miʃɛl də la pjɛʁ]) is a former commune in the Manche department in Normandy in north-western France. On 1 January 2019, it was merged into the new commune Saint-Sauveur-Villages.

== See also ==
- Communes of the Manche department
