= Les Quatre Braves =

War Memorial located in Amiens, France

The Four Braves
- Les Quatre Braves
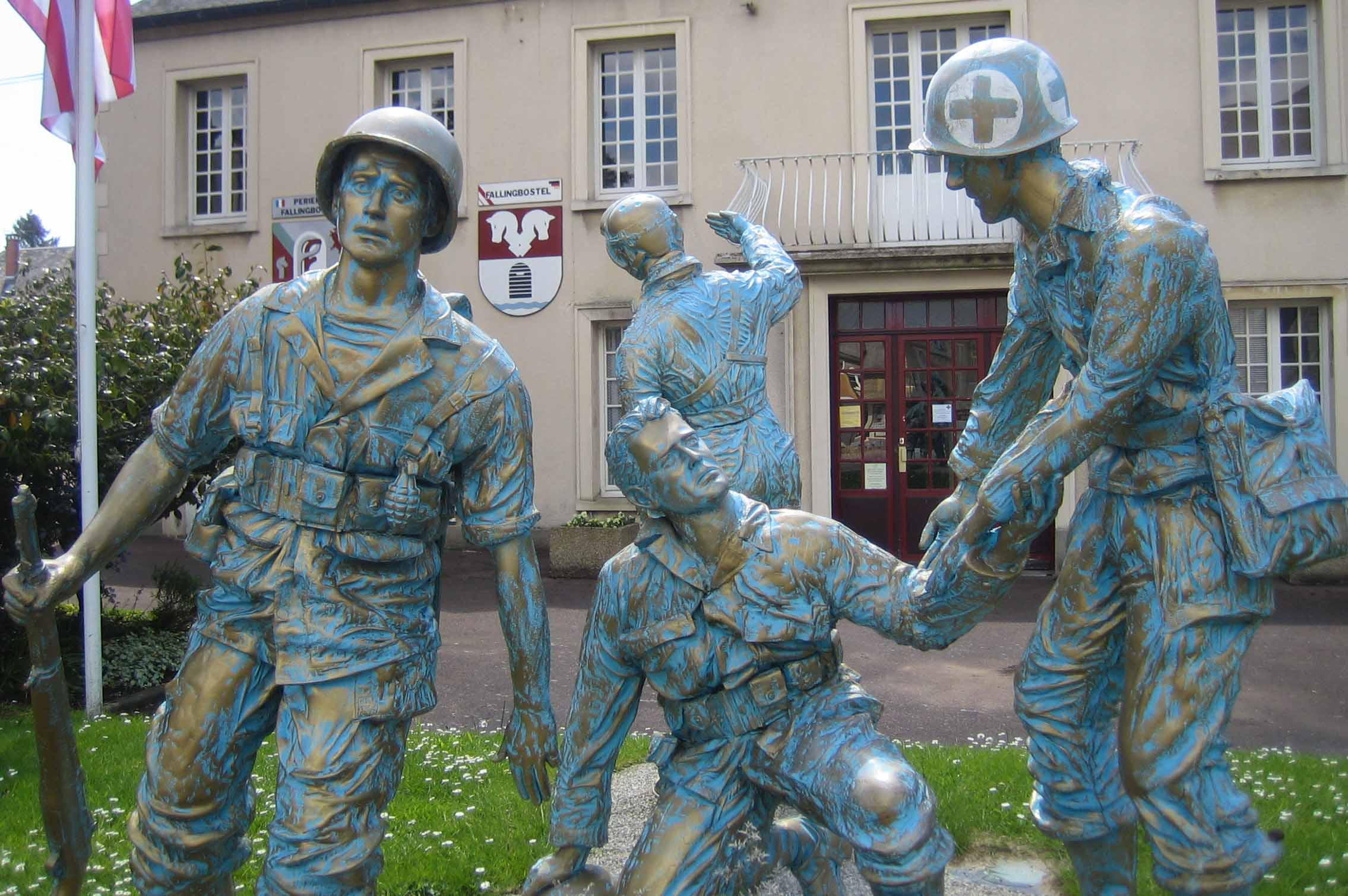
- WWII monument of the 90th American infantry division in Périers, France
- Interactive map of The Four Braves
- Location: Périers, France
- Coordinates: 49.18579°N 1.40862°W
- Designer: Patrick Cottencin
- Material: Bronze reinforced synthetic resin with a bright blue accent paint
- Completion date: 2000
- Dedicated to: 90th Infantry Division (United States)

Les Quatre Braves (French) (The Four Braves) is a war memorial by sculptor Patrick Cottencin in Périers, France. The sculpture is dedicated to the men of the 90th Infantry Division (United States) who died in World War II during Operation Cobra a stage of the 1944 Normandy invasion.

== Background ==
The sculpture by Patrick Cottencin memorializes the 90th US Infantry division who died from June 4, 1944, to July 27, 1944, trying to liberate Périers, France. The memorial sits at the entrance of the Mairie (Town Hall) The memorial was dedicated on June 4, 2000. The sculpture is made of bronze reinforced synthetic resin.

The memorial depicts four American soldiers who lost their lives in the Normandy invasion. A medic is shown assisting a wounded soldier, who is trying to stand, as a third guards them. Behind, the remaining soldier signals his platoon of tanks to move.

== Depicted in the memorial ==
- Private 2nd Class Andrew J. Speese III, 1912 - 1944, died in Le Plessis-Lastelle 7 July 1944. 90th division.
- Private 2nd Class Richard E. Richtman, 1924 - 1944, died in Périers 26 July 1944. 90th division.
- Private 1st Class Virgil J. Tangborn, 1920–1944, died in Amfreville 14 June 1944. 90th division.
- Sergeant Tullio Micaloni, 1913 - 1944. died 26 July 1944. 90th division.

== See also ==
- Monument
- War Memorial
