= Patrick Cottencin =

20th Century Sculptor

- Born: Patrick Cottencin; 1955 (age 70–71); France
- Known for: Sculpture Painter
- Notable work: Les Quatre Braves

Patrick Cottencin (born 1955) is a 20th-century painter and sculptor from France. He is known for an outdoor war memorial honoring the US 90th Infantry Division entitled Les Quatre Braves.

== Career ==
On June 4, 2000, Cottencin unveiled a resin sculpture entitled "Les Quatre Braves" (a.k.a. "The Four Braves") memorial (sculpture) in Périers, France. The memorial scene includes four American soldiers from the US 90th Infantry Division who lost their lives in the Normandy invasion. His use of bright colors (blue) was evident on the resin sculpture.

Cottencin is also a painter and his work has been displayed in the Contemporary Art Center in Trizay and the Romanesque Abbey of Notre-Dame de Trizay.

=== Designs ===
Sculpture by Patrick Cottencin
| Name | Image | Year | Address | Notes/Refs. |
|---|---|---|---|---|
| Les Quatre Braves | | 2000 | Périers, France | |
