= Vaudrimesnil =

- Part of Saint-Sauveur-Villages
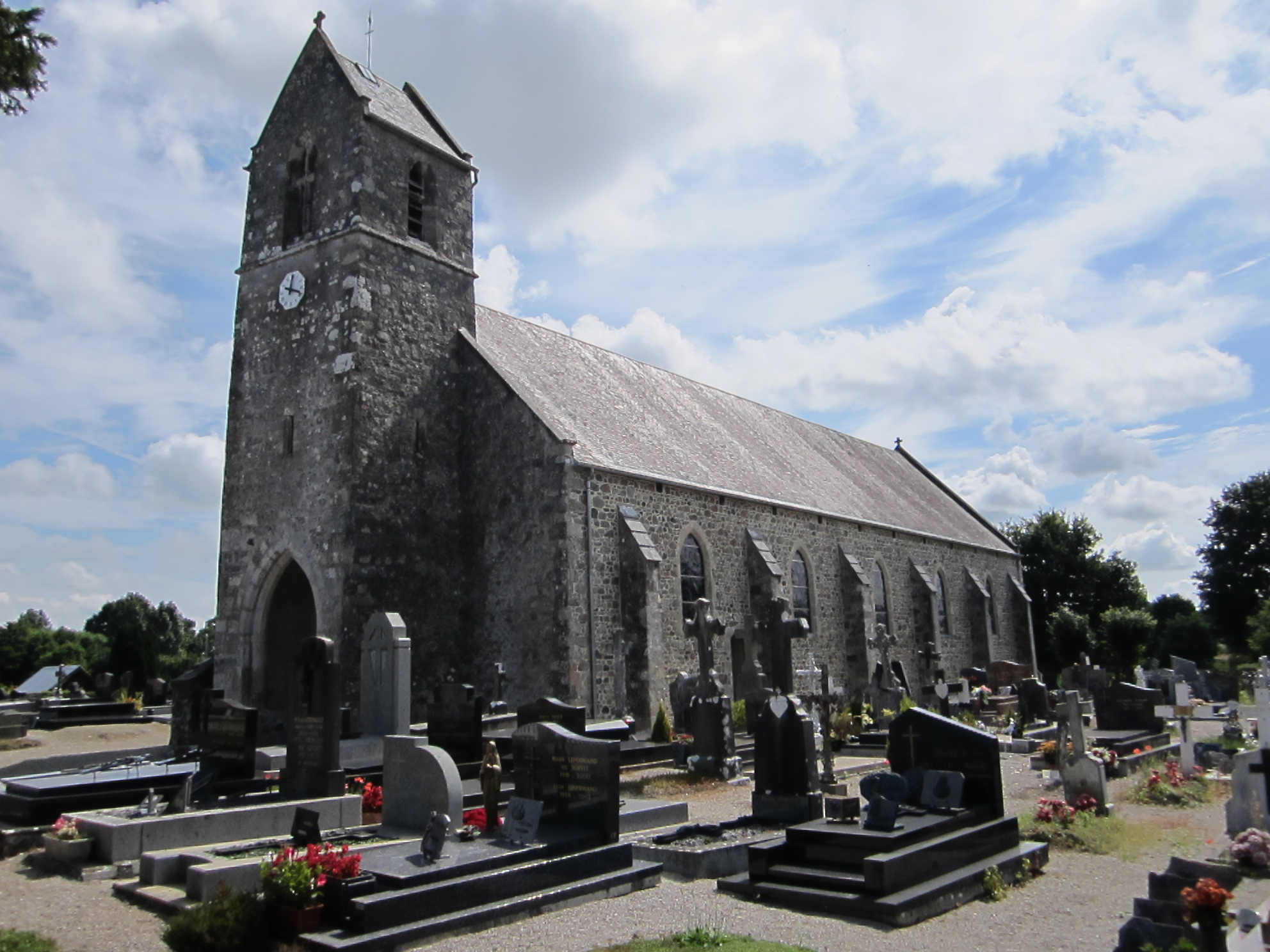
- Saint-Manvieu church
- Location of Vaudrimesnil
- Location within France Location within Normandy
- Coordinates: 49°09′14″N 1°24′50″W
- Country: France
- Region: Normandy
- Department: Manche
- Arrondissement: Coutances
- Canton: Agon-Coutainville
- Commune: Saint-Sauveur-Villages
- Area^{1}: 6.05 km^{2} (2.34 sq mi)
- Elevation: 27 m (89 ft)
- Highest elevation: 40 m (130 ft)
- Lowest elevation: 16 m (52 ft)
- Population (2022): 399
  - Density: 66.0/km^{2} (171/sq mi)
- Time zone: UTC+01:00 (CET)
  - Summer (DST): UTC+02:00 (CEST)
- Postal code: 50490
- ^{1} French Land Register data, which excludes lakes, ponds, glaciers > 1 km^{2} (0.386 sq mi or 247 acres) and river estuaries.

Vaudrimesnil (French pronunciation: [vodʁimɛnil]) is a former commune in the Manche department in Normandy in north-western France. On 1 January 2019, it was merged into the new commune Saint-Sauveur-Villages.

== See also ==
- Communes of the Manche department
