= Boisroger =

- Part of Gouville-sur-Mer
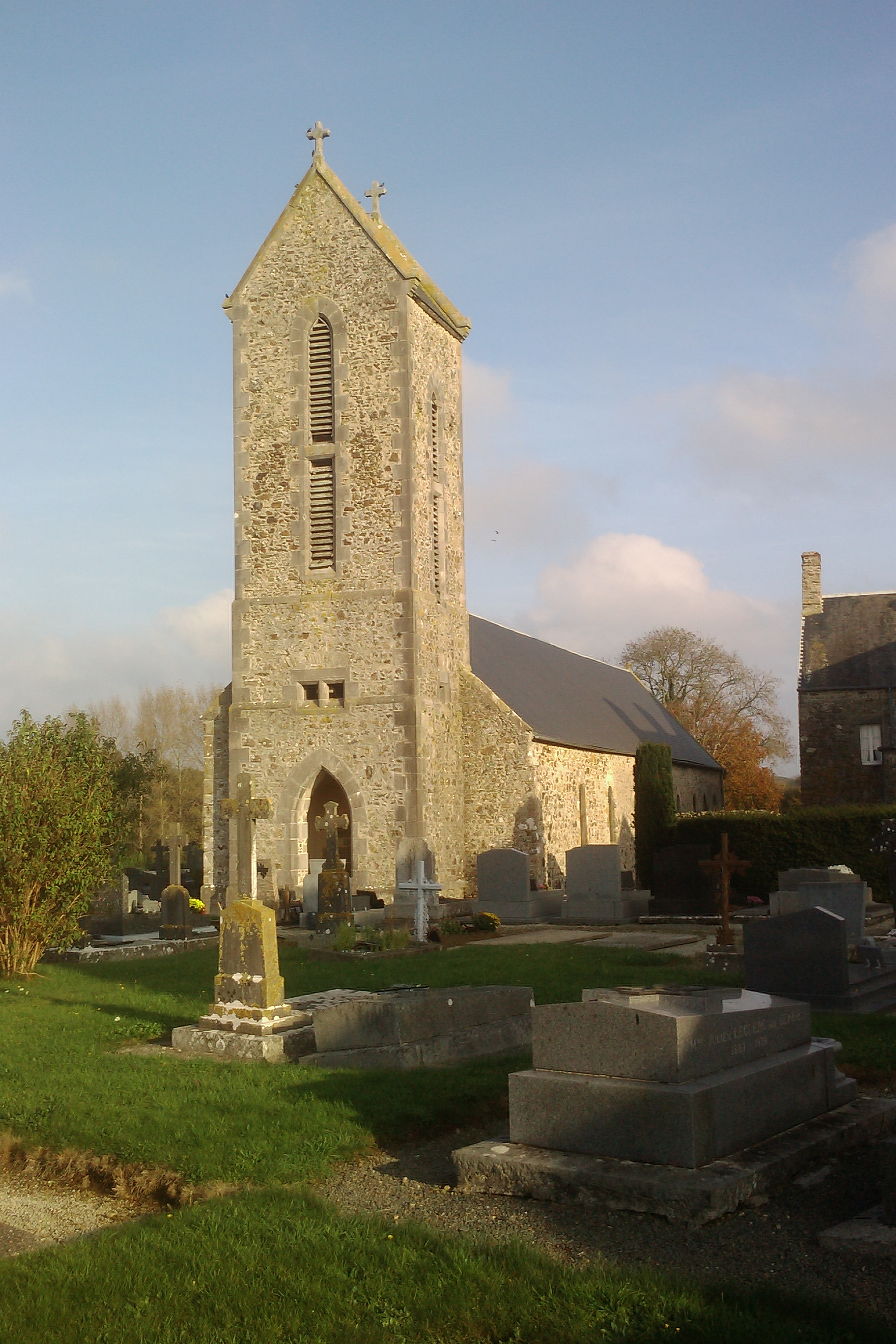
- The church of Saint-Nicolas
- Location of Boisroger
- Location within France Location within Normandy
- Coordinates: 49°05′30″N 1°32′32″W
- Country: France
- Region: Normandy
- Department: Manche
- Arrondissement: Coutances
- Canton: Agon-Coutainville
- Commune: Gouville-sur-Mer
- Area^{1}: 5.3 km^{2} (2.0 sq mi)
- Elevation: 50 m (160 ft)
- Highest elevation: 78 m (256 ft)
- Lowest elevation: 28 m (92 ft)
- Population (2023): 228
  - Density: 43/km^{2} (110/sq mi)
- Time zone: UTC+01:00 (CET)
  - Summer (DST): UTC+02:00 (CEST)
- Postal code: 50200
- ^{1} French Land Register data, which excludes lakes, ponds, glaciers > 1 km^{2} (0.386 sq mi or 247 acres) and river estuaries.

Boisroger (French pronunciation: [bwaʁɔʒe]) is a former commune in the Manche department in Normandy in northwestern France. On 1 January 2016, it was merged into the commune of Gouville-sur-Mer.

== See also ==
- Communes of the Manche department
