= Jean-Pierre Ugarte =

French painter

Jean-Pierre Ugarte (born 7 January 1950) is a French Painter.

== Biography ==
Jean-Pierre Ugarte was born January 7, 1950 in Bordeaux, France. His father was a railway worker. His mother died in 1962. He lived with his Aunts and Uncles on the family farm until the age of 8.

Between 1961 and 1966, he created about forty paintings without any formal training.

Ugarte studied at the École des Beaux-Arts in Bordeaux between 1966 and 1971. He worked as a teacher for a year at a high school in Nay, Manche, and as a graphic designer for twelve years for the commune of Lacq.

In the 1980s, Jean-Pierre Ugarte, together with Pierre Soust and Jean-Marie Poumeyrol, were known as the "Pau School".

== Style ==
Ugarte's style has been influenced by Surrealism. He was also influenced by the architecture of Atlantic Wall. Of his style, Ugarte himself says that he wishes to give viewers the impression that his paintings are of real places, even though they are completely imaginary.

His use of dull blue-grays, beiges, and bronzes have drawn comparisons to old photographs. His style has also been compared to that of Albrecht Altdorfer and Caspar David Friedrich.

== Exhibitions ==
=== Group ===
- 1977 — Regards sur les Arts (Artists in Focus), Notre-Dame de Lamballe, Côtes-d'Armor

=== Solo ===
- 1989 — Galerie Troisième Oeil, Bordeaux
- 1991 — Musée des Beaux-Arts, Pau, Pyrénées-Atlantiques
- 1993 — Hôtel de Ville, Nay, Manche
- 1993 — Galerie Alain Blondel, Paris
- 1995 — Galerie Elysée Montaigne, Paris
- 1996 — Galerie Elysée Montaigne, Paris
- 2015 — Ugarte, métaphysique du territoire, Musée des Beaux-Arts de Pau, Pau, Pyrénées-Atlantiques
