= Saint-Sauveur-Villages =

- Commune
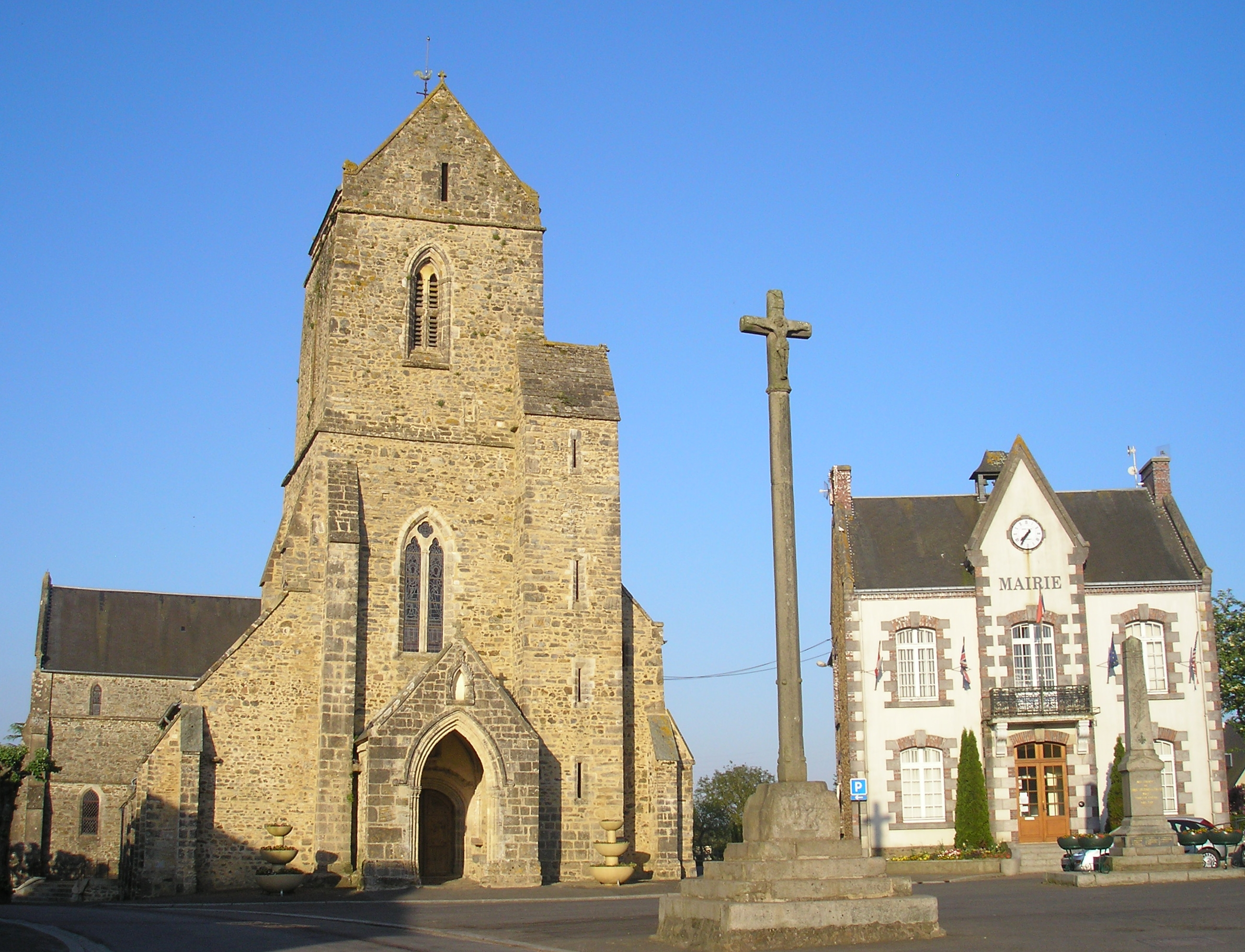
- The church of Saint-Laurent, the 1571 cross and the town hall
- Location of Saint-Sauveur-Villages
- Location within France Location within Normandy
- Coordinates: 49°07′52″N 1°24′44″W
- Country: France
- Region: Normandy
- Department: Manche
- Arrondissement: Coutances
- Canton: Agon-Coutainville
- Intercommunality: Coutances Mer et Bocage

Government
  - Mayor (2020–2026): Aurélie Gigan
- Area^{1}: 53.70 km^{2} (20.73 sq mi)
- Highest elevation: 128 m (420 ft)
- Lowest elevation: 15 m (49 ft)
- Population (2023): 3,208
  - Density: 59.74/km^{2} (154.7/sq mi)
- Time zone: UTC+01:00 (CET)
  - Summer (DST): UTC+02:00 (CEST)
- INSEE/Postal code: 50550 /50490
- ^{1} French Land Register data, which excludes lakes, ponds, glaciers > 1 km^{2} (0.386 sq mi or 247 acres) and river estuaries.

Saint-Sauveur-Villages (French pronunciation: [sɛ̃ sovœʁ vilaʒ]) is a commune in the Manche department in Normandy in north-western France. It was established on 1 January 2019 by merger of the former communes of Saint-Sauveur-Lendelin (the seat), Ancteville, Le Mesnilbus, La Ronde-Haye, Saint-Aubin-du-Perron, Saint-Michel-de-la-Pierre and Vaudrimesnil.

== Population ==
Population data refer to the area corresponding with the commune as of January 2025.

Historical population
Year	Pop.	±% p.a.
1968	3,168	—
1975	2,994	−0.80%
1982	2,855	−0.68%
1990	2,807	−0.21%
1999	2,858	+0.20%
2007	3,269	+1.69%
2012	3,462	+1.15%
2017	3,588	+0.72%
2023	3,208	−1.85%
Source: INSEE

== See also ==
- Communes of the Manche department
