= Gonfreville =

- Commune
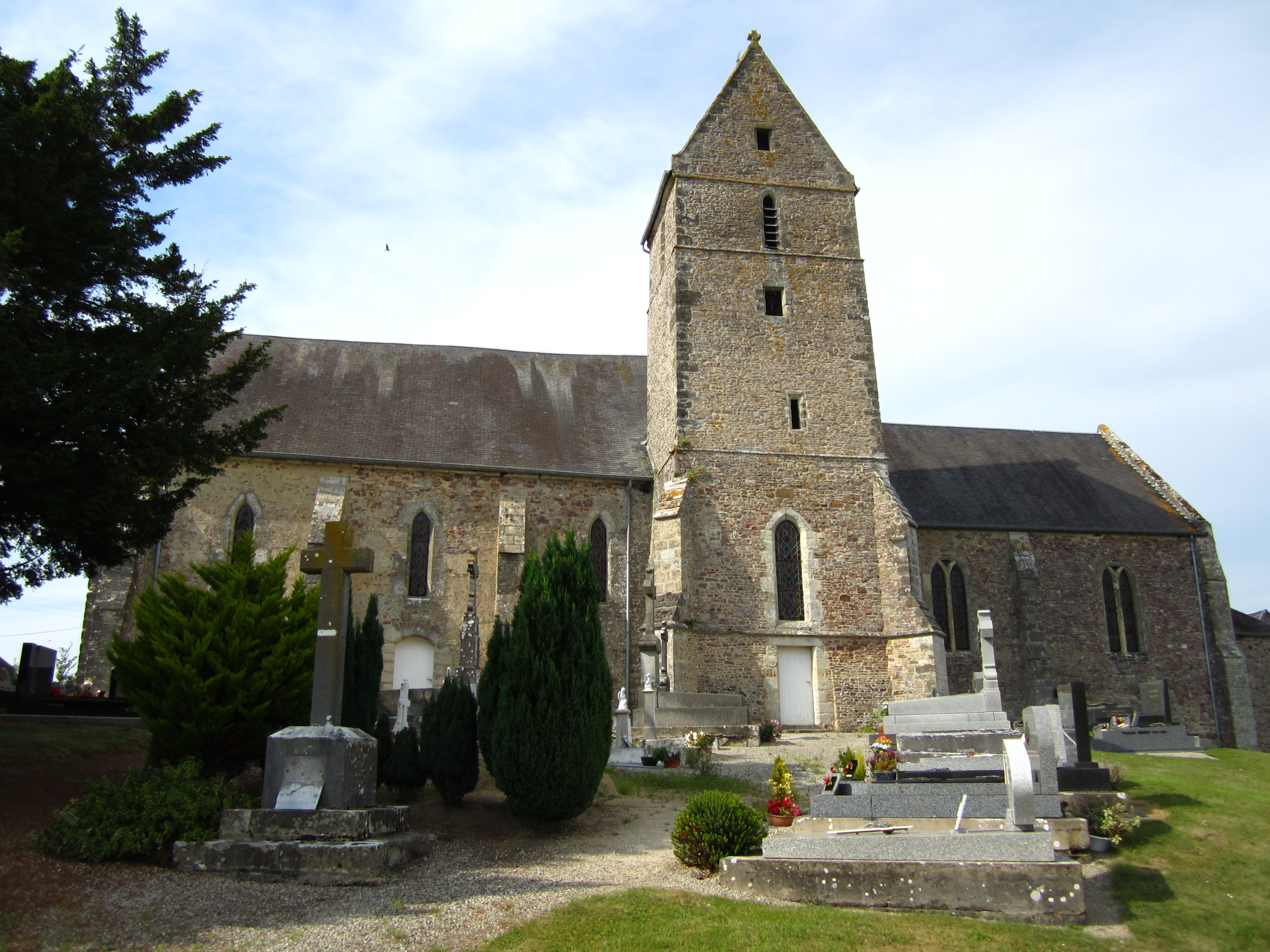
- The church of Saint-Manvieu
- Location of Gonfreville
- Location within France Location within Normandy
- Coordinates: 49°14′22″N 1°23′38″W
- Country: France
- Region: Normandy
- Department: Manche
- Arrondissement: Coutances
- Canton: Agon-Coutainville

Government
  - Mayor (2020–2026): Vincent Langevin
- Area^{1}: 9.04 km^{2} (3.49 sq mi)
- Elevation: 15 m (49 ft)
- Highest elevation: 33 m (108 ft)
- Lowest elevation: 3 m (9.8 ft)
- Population (2023): 164
  - Density: 18.1/km^{2} (47.0/sq mi)
- Time zone: UTC+01:00 (CET)
  - Summer (DST): UTC+02:00 (CEST)
- INSEE/Postal code: 50208 /50190
- ^{1} French Land Register data, which excludes lakes, ponds, glaciers > 1 km^{2} (0.386 sq mi or 247 acres) and river estuaries.

Gonfreville (French pronunciation: [ɡɔ̃fʁəvil]) is a commune in the Manche department in north-western France.

== See also ==
- Communes of the Manche department
