= Raids, Manche =

Raids
- Commune
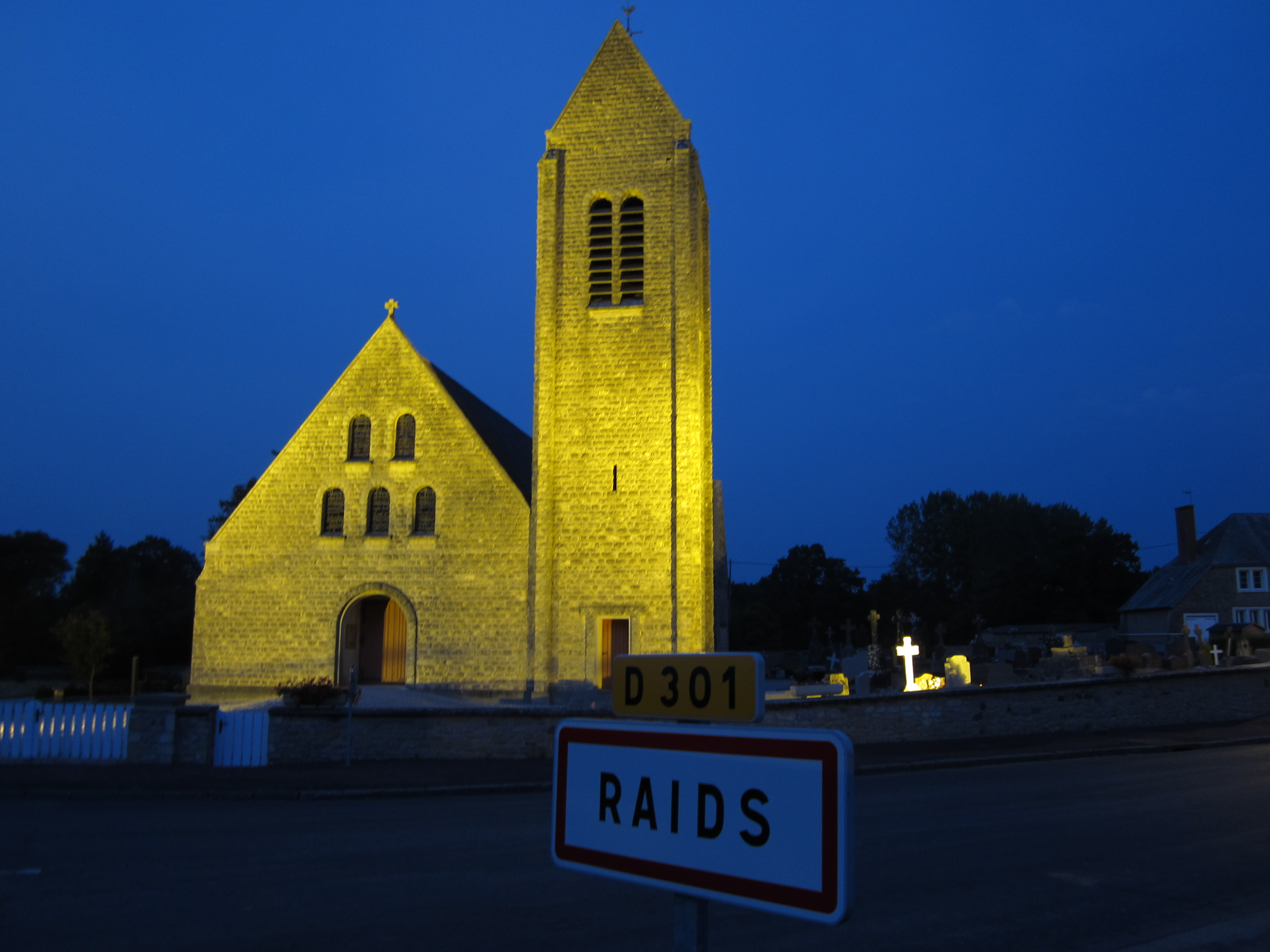
- The church of Saint-Georges

- Coat of arms
- Location of Raids
- Location within France Location within Normandy
- Coordinates: 49°13′04″N 1°20′34″W
- Country: France
- Region: Normandy
- Department: Manche
- Arrondissement: Coutances
- Canton: Agon-Coutainville

Government
  - Mayor (2020–2026): Jean-Claude Lambard
- Area^{1}: 6.80 km^{2} (2.63 sq mi)
- Elevation: 12 m (39 ft)
- Highest elevation: 19 m (62 ft)
- Lowest elevation: 2 m (6.6 ft)
- Population (2023): 216
  - Density: 31.8/km^{2} (82.3/sq mi)
- Time zone: UTC+01:00 (CET)
  - Summer (DST): UTC+02:00 (CEST)
- INSEE/Postal code: 50422 /50500
- ^{1} French Land Register data, which excludes lakes, ponds, glaciers > 1 km^{2} (0.386 sq mi or 247 acres) and river estuaries.

Raids is a commune in the Manche department in north-western France.

== See also ==
- Communes of the Manche department
