= Auxais =

- Commune
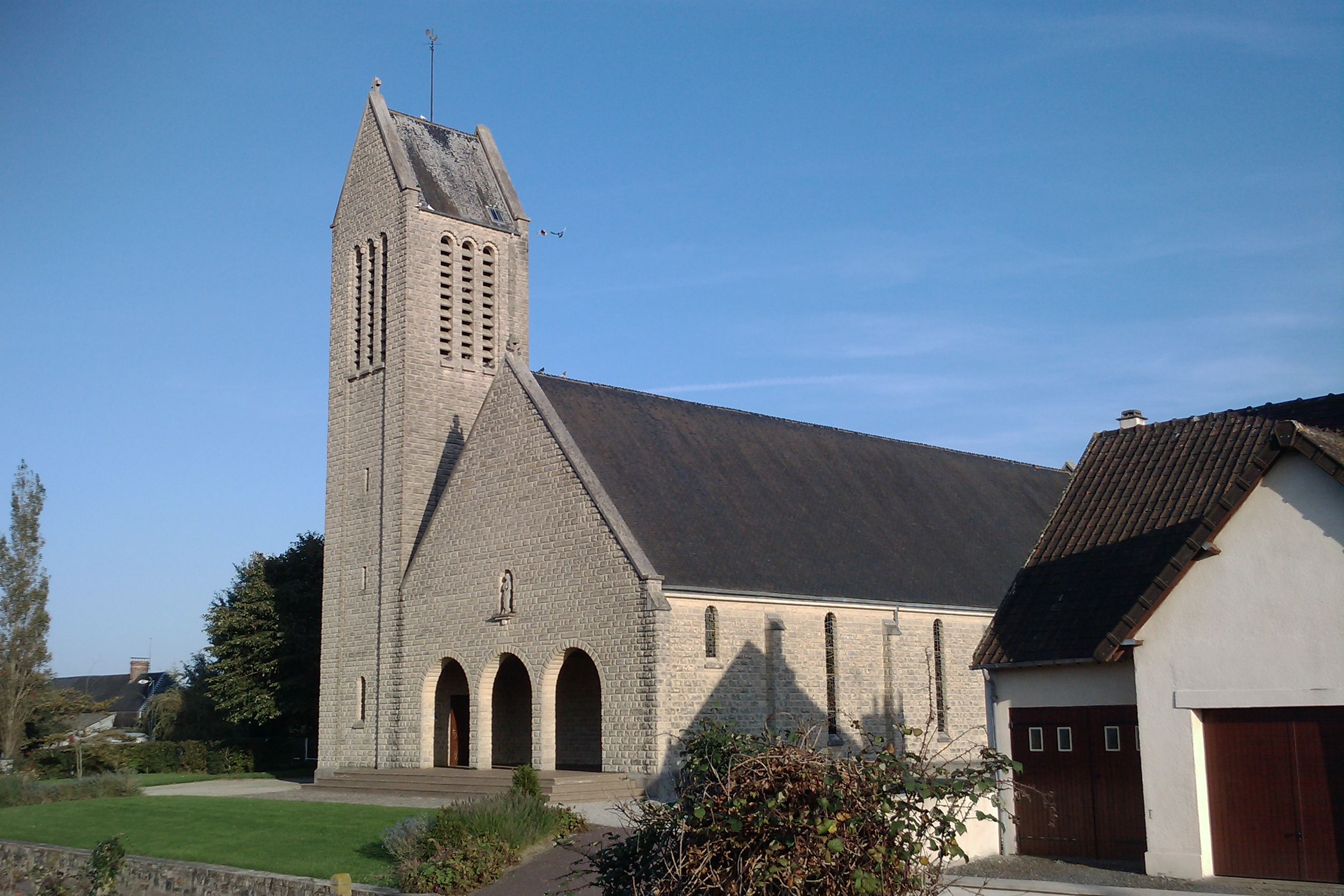
- Notre-Dame church after reconstruction
- Location of Auxais
- Location within France Location within Normandy
- Coordinates: 49°12′50″N 1°17′51″W
- Country: France
- Region: Normandy
- Department: Manche
- Arrondissement: Coutances
- Canton: Agon-Coutainville
- Intercommunality: CC Côte Ouest Centre Manche

Government
  - Mayor (2020–2026): Hubert Gillette
- Area^{1}: 7.76 km^{2} (3.00 sq mi)
- Elevation: 16 m (52 ft)
- Highest elevation: 19 m (62 ft)
- Lowest elevation: 2 m (6.6 ft)
- Population (2023): 176
  - Density: 22.7/km^{2} (58.7/sq mi)
- Time zone: UTC+01:00 (CET)
  - Summer (DST): UTC+02:00 (CEST)
- INSEE/Postal code: 50024 /50500
- ^{1} French Land Register data, which excludes lakes, ponds, glaciers > 1 km^{2} (0.386 sq mi or 247 acres) and river estuaries.

Auxais (French pronunciation: [o.seː]) is a commune in the Manche department in the Normandy region in northwestern France.

== Population ==
Historical population
Year	Pop.	±% p.a.
1968	180	—
1975	156	−2.02%
1982	135	−2.04%
1990	130	−0.47%
1999	137	+0.58%
2007	165	+2.35%
2012	176	+1.30%
2017	174	−0.23%
2023	176	+0.19%
Source: INSEE

The inhabitants are called Auxerons in French.

== See also ==
- Communes of the Manche department
