= Le Mesnilbus =

- Part of Saint-Sauveur-Villages
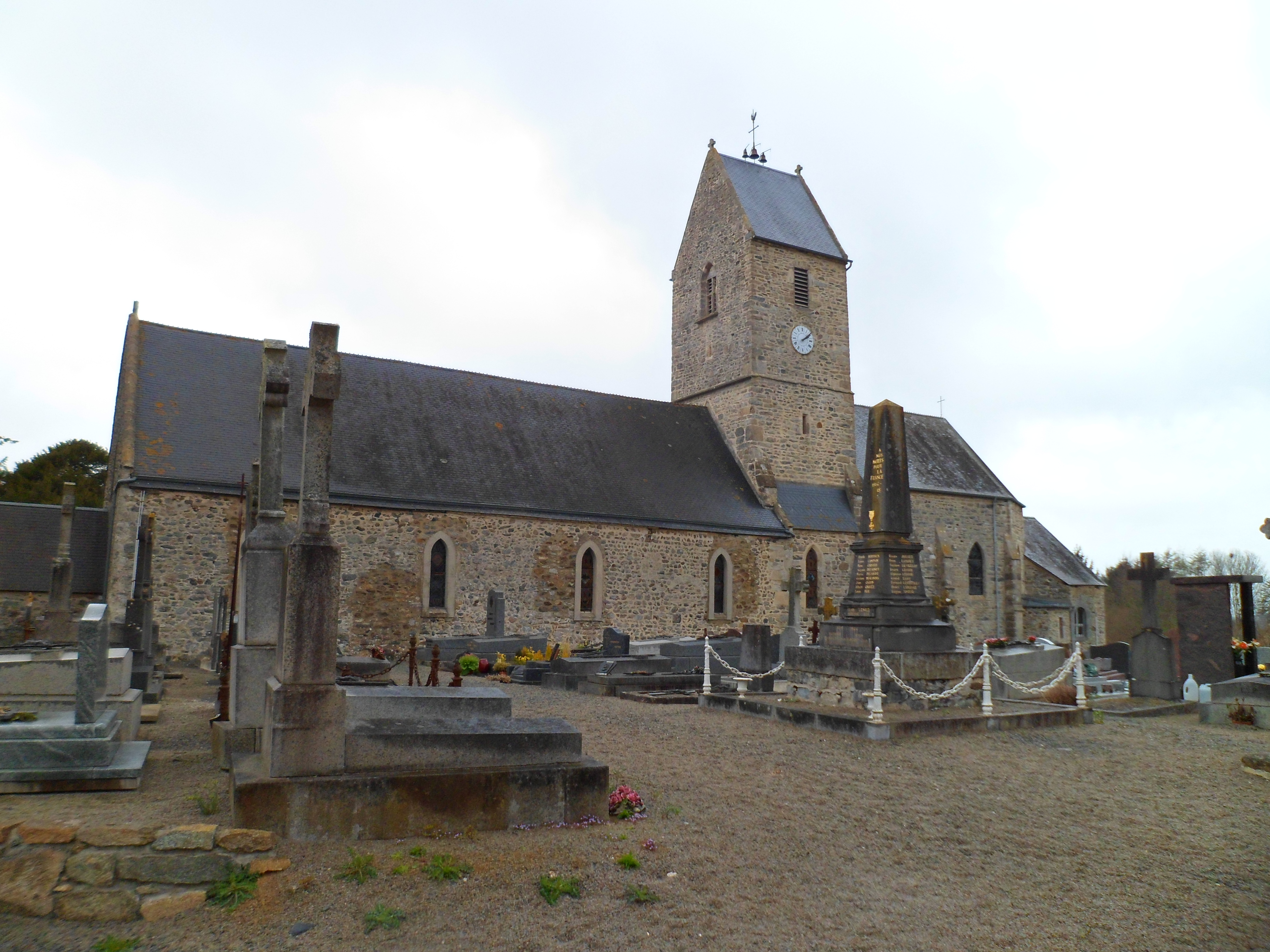
- The church of Notre-Dame de l'Assomption
- Location of Le Mesnilbus
- Location within France Location within Normandy
- Coordinates: 49°08′03″N 1°20′54″W
- Country: France
- Region: Normandy
- Department: Manche
- Arrondissement: Coutances
- Canton: Agon-Coutainville
- Commune: Saint-Sauveur-Villages
- Area^{1}: 4.98 km^{2} (1.92 sq mi)
- Elevation: 76 m (249 ft)
- Highest elevation: 121 m (397 ft)
- Lowest elevation: 32 m (105 ft)
- Population (2022): 353
  - Density: 70.9/km^{2} (184/sq mi)
- Time zone: UTC+01:00 (CET)
  - Summer (DST): UTC+02:00 (CEST)
- Postal code: 50490
- ^{1} French Land Register data, which excludes lakes, ponds, glaciers > 1 km^{2} (0.386 sq mi or 247 acres) and river estuaries.

Le Mesnilbus (French pronunciation: [lə menilby]) is a former commune in the Manche department in Normandy in north-western France. On 1 January 2019, it was merged into the new commune Saint-Sauveur-Villages.

== Heraldry ==
Arms of Le Mesnilbus	The arms of Le Mesnilbus are blazoned : Azure, a chevron between 3 mullets Or and a lancehead argent.

== See also ==
- Communes of the Manche department
