= Geffosses =

- Commune
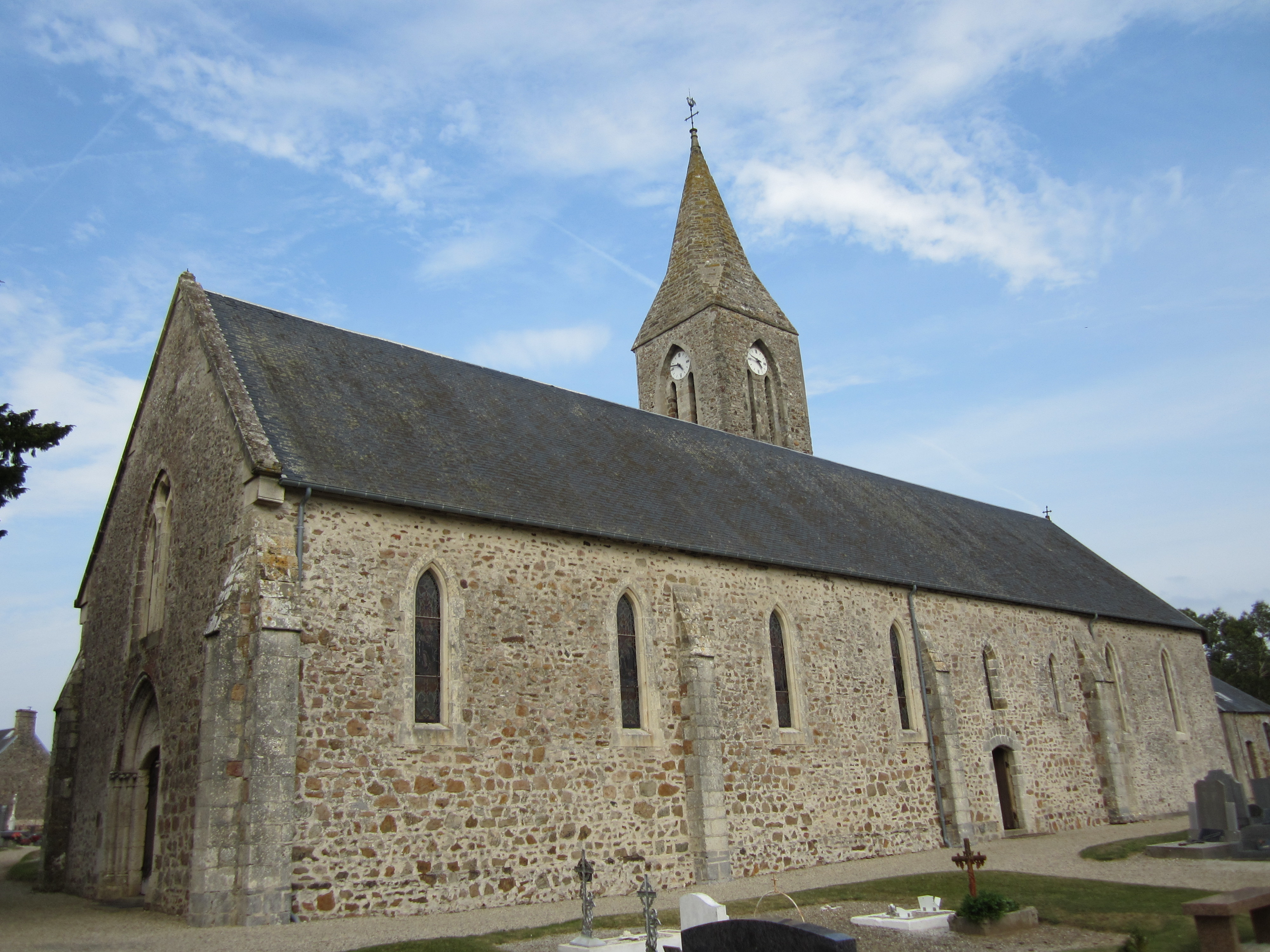
- The church of Saint-Samson
- Location of Geffosses
- Location within France Location within Normandy
- Coordinates: 49°07′55″N 1°33′28″W
- Country: France
- Region: Normandy
- Department: Manche
- Arrondissement: Coutances
- Canton: Agon-Coutainville

Government
  - Mayor (2020–2026): Michel Neveu
- Area^{1}: 15.07 km^{2} (5.82 sq mi)
- Elevation: 21 m (69 ft)
- Highest elevation: 39 m (128 ft)
- Lowest elevation: 2 m (6.6 ft)
- Population (2023): 501
  - Density: 33.2/km^{2} (86.1/sq mi)
- Time zone: UTC+01:00 (CET)
  - Summer (DST): UTC+02:00 (CEST)
- INSEE/Postal code: 50198 /50560
- ^{1} French Land Register data, which excludes lakes, ponds, glaciers > 1 km^{2} (0.386 sq mi or 247 acres) and river estuaries.

Geffosses (French pronunciation: [ʒɛfos]) is a commune in the Manche department in north-western France.

== See also ==
- Communes of the Manche department
