= Ancteville =

- Part of Saint-Sauveur-Villages
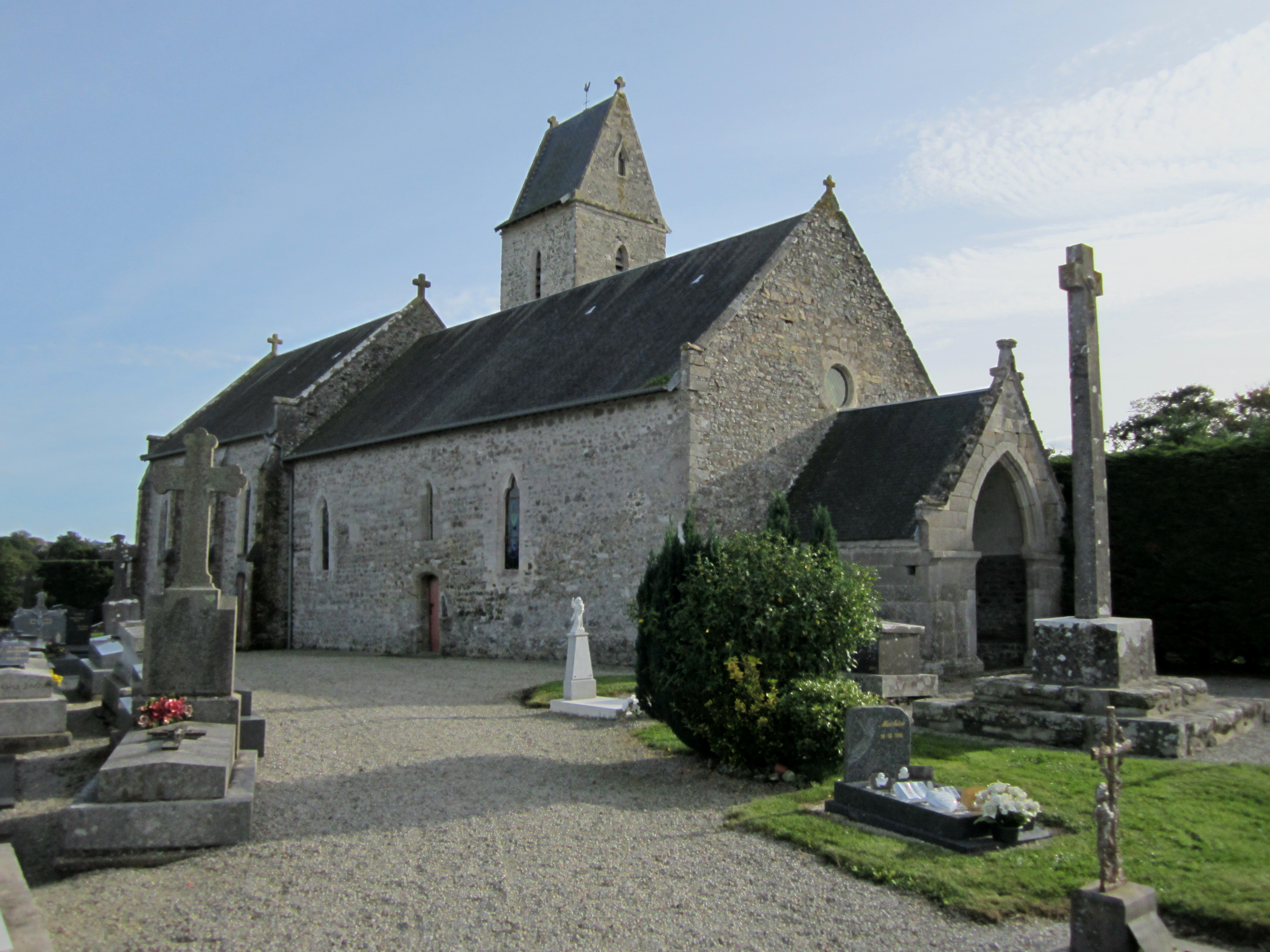
- Saint-Pierre church
- Location of Ancteville
- Location within France Location within Normandy
- Coordinates: 49°06′11″N 1°28′44″W
- Country: France
- Region: Normandy
- Department: Manche
- Arrondissement: Coutances
- Canton: Coutances
- Commune: Saint-Sauveur-Villages
- Area^{1}: 7.74 km^{2} (2.99 sq mi)
- Elevation: 80 m (260 ft)
- Highest elevation: 128 m (420 ft)
- Lowest elevation: 44 m (144 ft)
- Population (2023): 213
  - Density: 27.5/km^{2} (71.3/sq mi)
- Time zone: UTC+01:00 (CET)
  - Summer (DST): UTC+02:00 (CEST)
- Postal code: 50200
- ^{1} French Land Register data, which excludes lakes, ponds, glaciers > 1 km^{2} (0.386 sq mi or 247 acres) and river estuaries.

Ancteville (French pronunciation: [ɑ̃ktəvil]) is a former commune in the Manche department in the Normandy region in northwestern France. On 1 January 2019, it was merged into the new commune Saint-Sauveur-Villages.

== See also ==
- Communes of the Manche department
