= Saint-Sébastien-de-Raids =

- Commune
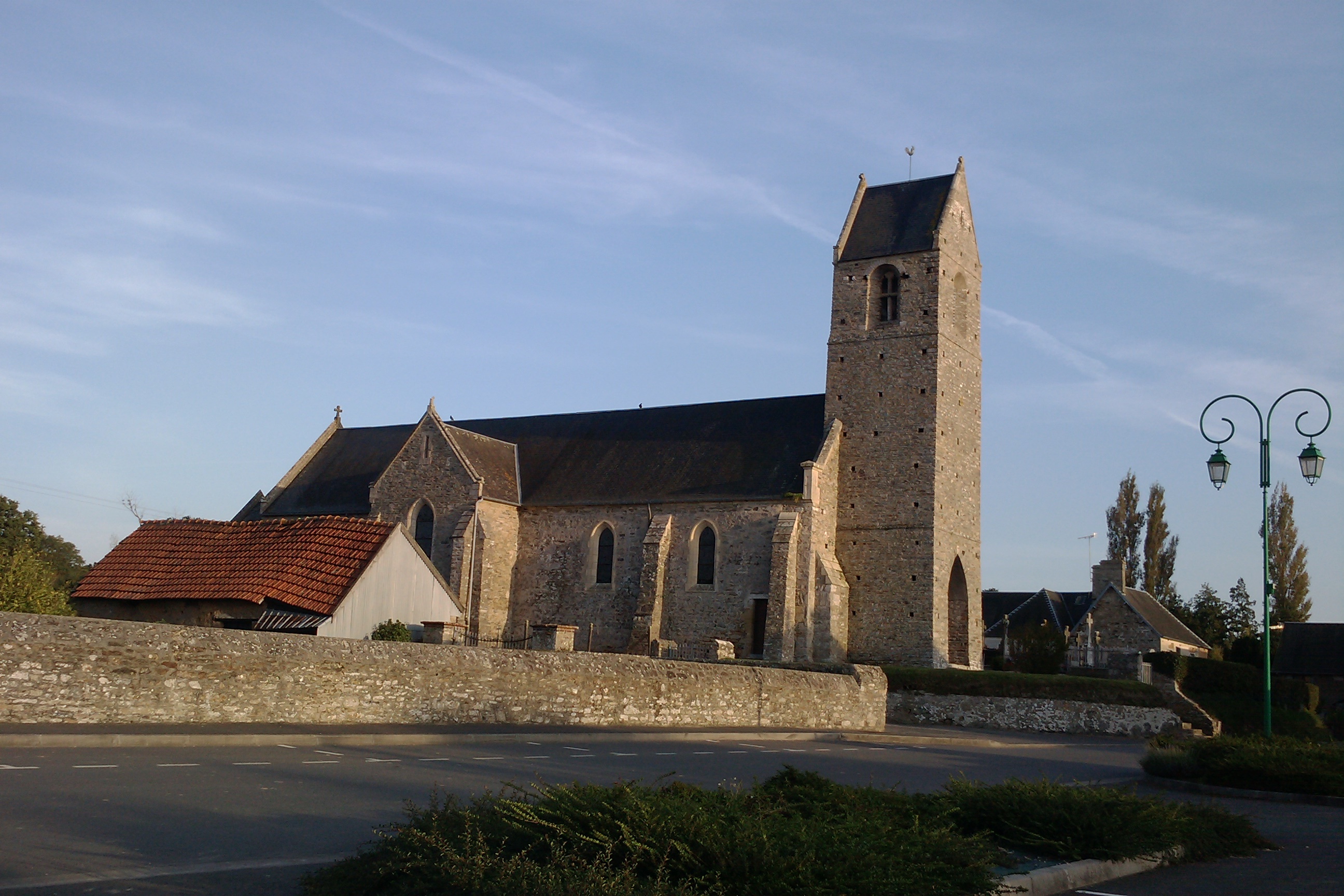
- The church of Saint-Sébastien
- Location of Saint-Sébastien-de-Raids
- Location within France Location within Normandy
- Coordinates: 49°11′29″N 1°22′12″W
- Country: France
- Region: Normandy
- Department: Manche
- Arrondissement: Coutances
- Canton: Agon-Coutainville

Government
  - Mayor (2020–2026): Daniel Duval
- Area^{1}: 5.27 km^{2} (2.03 sq mi)
- Elevation: 19 m (62 ft)
- Highest elevation: 25 m (82 ft)
- Lowest elevation: 7 m (23 ft)
- Population (2023): 322
  - Density: 61.1/km^{2} (158/sq mi)
- Time zone: UTC+01:00 (CET)
  - Summer (DST): UTC+02:00 (CEST)
- INSEE/Postal code: 50552 /50190
- ^{1} French Land Register data, which excludes lakes, ponds, glaciers > 1 km^{2} (0.386 sq mi or 247 acres) and river estuaries.

Saint-Sébastien-de-Raids (French pronunciation: [sɛ̃ sebastjɛ̃ də ʁɛ]) is a commune in the Manche department in Normandy in north-western France.

== See also ==
- Communes of the Manche department
