= Montcuit =

- Commune
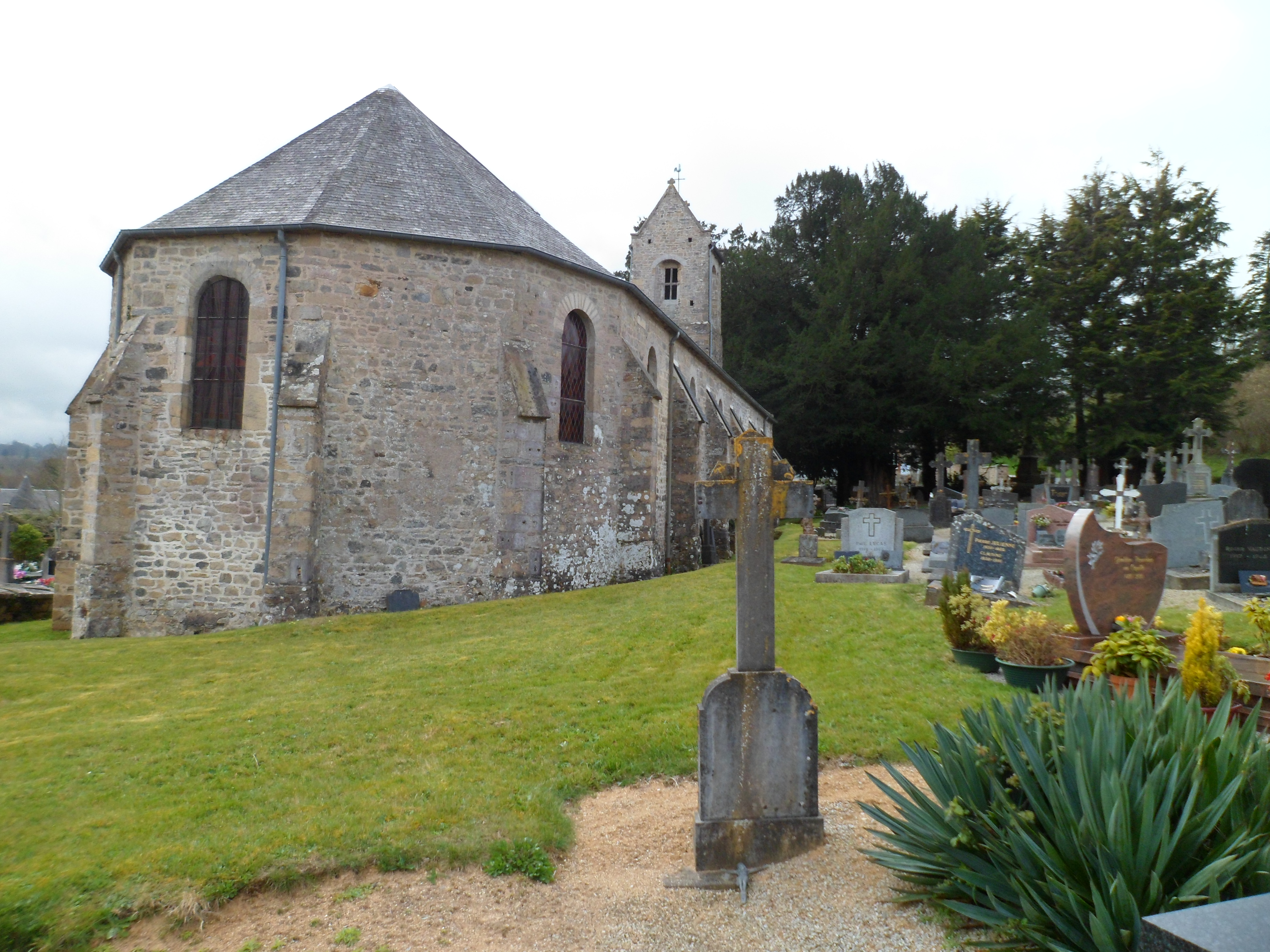
- The church of Saint-Martin
- Location of Montcuit
- Location within France Location within Normandy
- Coordinates: 49°07′17″N 1°20′24″W
- Country: France
- Region: Normandy
- Department: Manche
- Arrondissement: Coutances
- Canton: Agon-Coutainville

Government
  - Mayor (2020–2026): Guy Jouanno
- Area^{1}: 4.79 km^{2} (1.85 sq mi)
- Elevation: 146 m (479 ft)
- Highest elevation: 142 m (466 ft)
- Lowest elevation: 40 m (130 ft)
- Population (2023): 180
  - Density: 38/km^{2} (97/sq mi)
- Time zone: UTC+01:00 (CET)
  - Summer (DST): UTC+02:00 (CEST)
- INSEE/Postal code: 50340 /50490
- ^{1} French Land Register data, which excludes lakes, ponds, glaciers > 1 km^{2} (0.386 sq mi or 247 acres) and river estuaries.

Montcuit (French pronunciation: [mɔ̃kɥi]) is a commune in the Manche department in Normandy in north-western France.

== See also ==
- Communes of the Manche department
