= Feugères =

- Commune
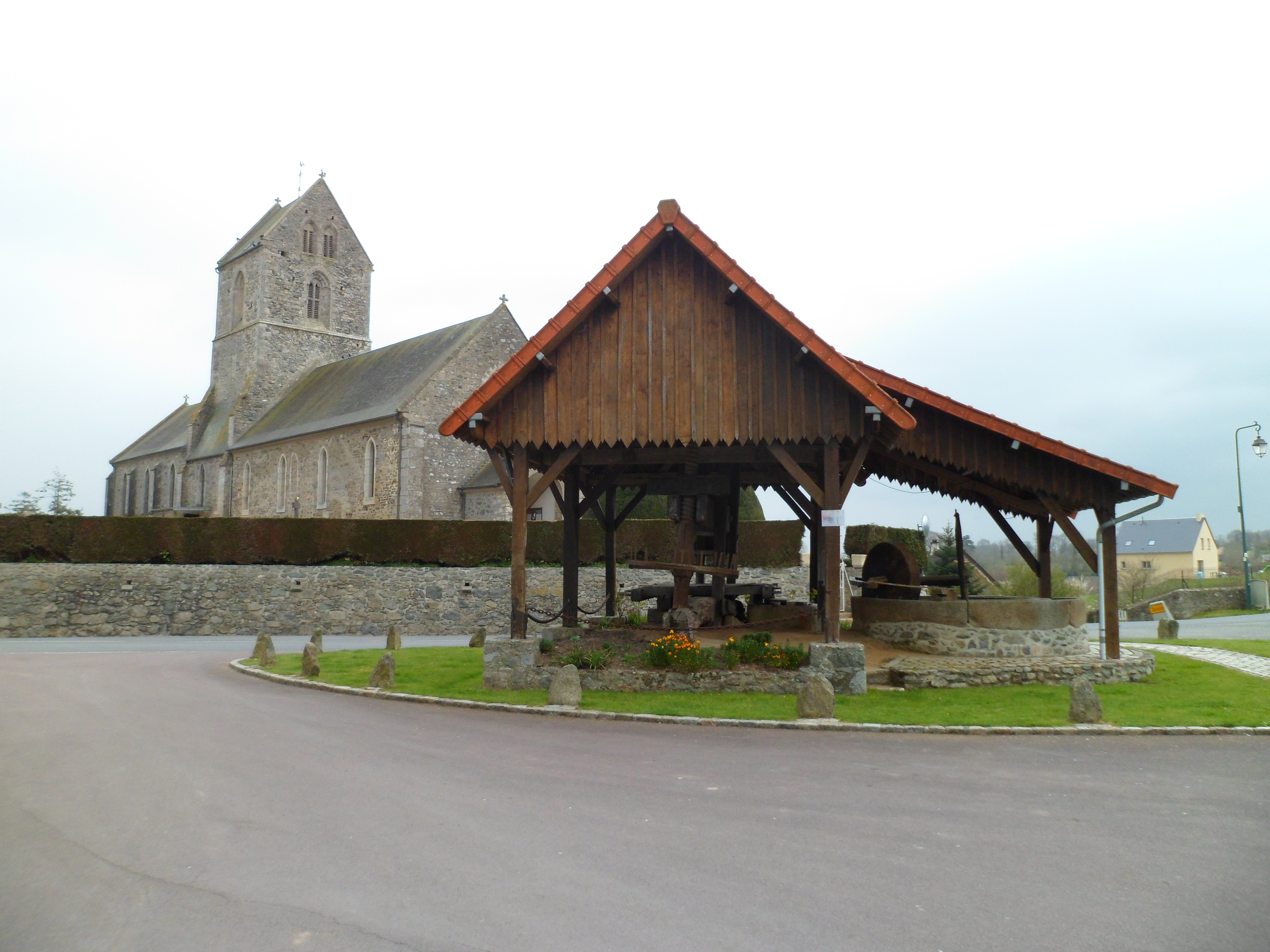
- The Wine Press and the church of Saint-Pierre
- Location of Feugères
- Location within France Location within Normandy
- Coordinates: 49°09′06″N 1°19′09″W
- Country: France
- Region: Normandy
- Department: Manche
- Arrondissement: Coutances
- Canton: Agon-Coutainville

Government
  - Mayor (2020–2026): Nicolas Jeanson
- Area^{1}: 8.31 km^{2} (3.21 sq mi)
- Elevation: 13 m (43 ft)
- Highest elevation: 112 m (367 ft)
- Lowest elevation: 4 m (13 ft)
- Population (2023): 356
  - Density: 42.8/km^{2} (111/sq mi)
- Time zone: UTC+01:00 (CET)
  - Summer (DST): UTC+02:00 (CEST)
- INSEE/Postal code: 50181 /50190
- ^{1} French Land Register data, which excludes lakes, ponds, glaciers > 1 km^{2} (0.386 sq mi or 247 acres) and river estuaries.

Feugères (French pronunciation: [føʒɛʁ]) is a commune in the Manche department in north-western France.

== See also ==
- Communes of the Manche department
