= Saint-Malo-de-la-Lande =

- Commune
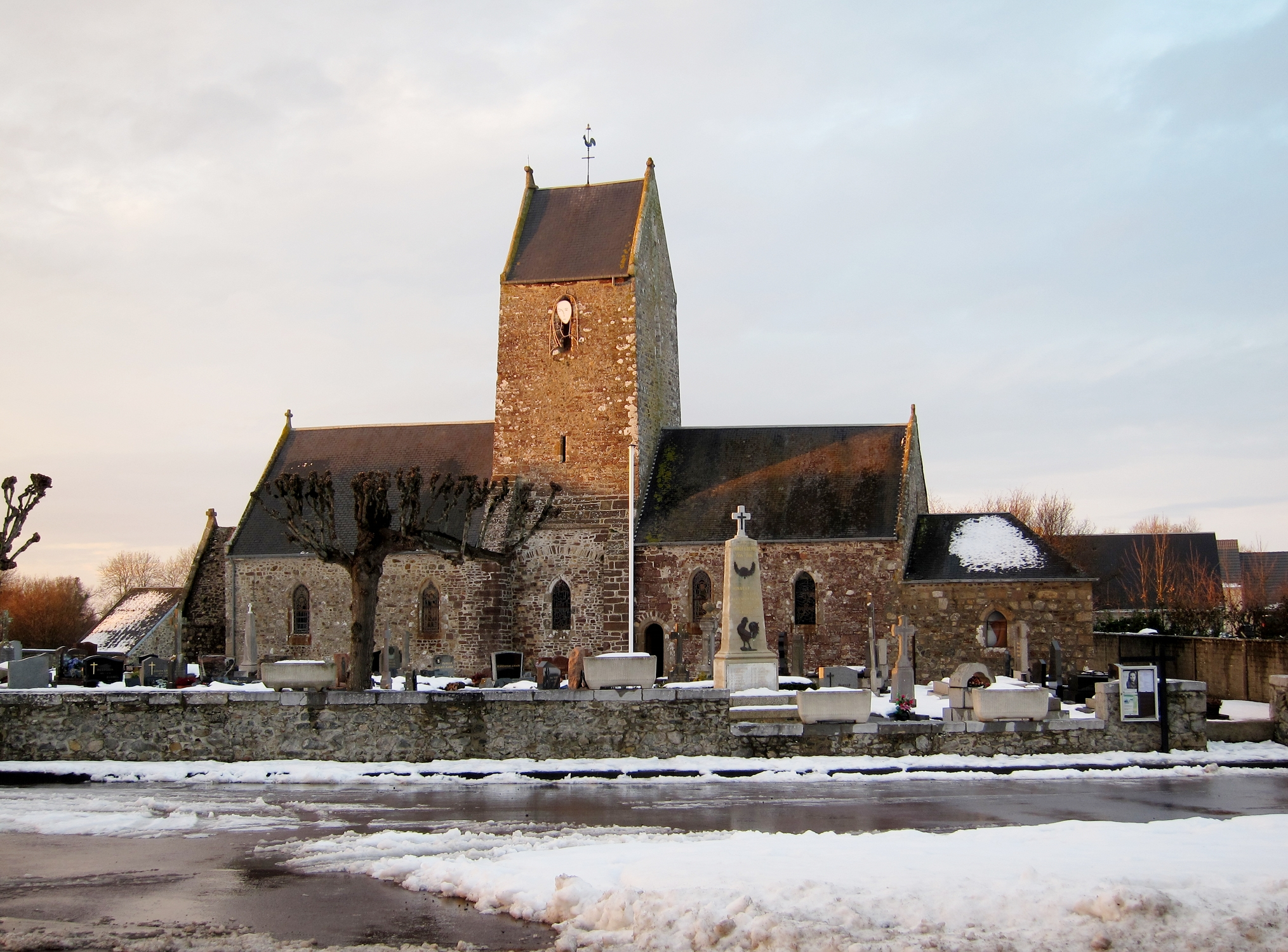
- The church of Saint-Malo

- Coat of arms
- Location of Saint-Malo-de-la-Lande
- Location within France Location within Normandy
- Coordinates: 49°04′18″N 1°32′21″W
- Country: France
- Region: Normandy
- Department: Manche
- Arrondissement: Coutances
- Canton: Agon-Coutainville

Government
  - Mayor (2020–2026): Jean-Pierre Perrodin
- Area^{1}: 4.01 km^{2} (1.55 sq mi)
- Elevation: 53 m (174 ft)
- Highest elevation: 71 m (233 ft)
- Lowest elevation: 14 m (46 ft)
- Population (2023): 460
  - Density: 110/km^{2} (300/sq mi)
- Time zone: UTC+01:00 (CET)
  - Summer (DST): UTC+02:00 (CEST)
- INSEE/Postal code: 50506 /50200
- ^{1} French Land Register data, which excludes lakes, ponds, glaciers > 1 km^{2} (0.386 sq mi or 247 acres) and river estuaries.

Saint-Malo-de-la-Lande (French pronunciation: [sɛ̃ malo də la lɑ̃d]) is a commune in the Manche department in Normandy in north-western France.

== See also ==
- Communes of the Manche department
