= Muneville-le-Bingard =

- Commune
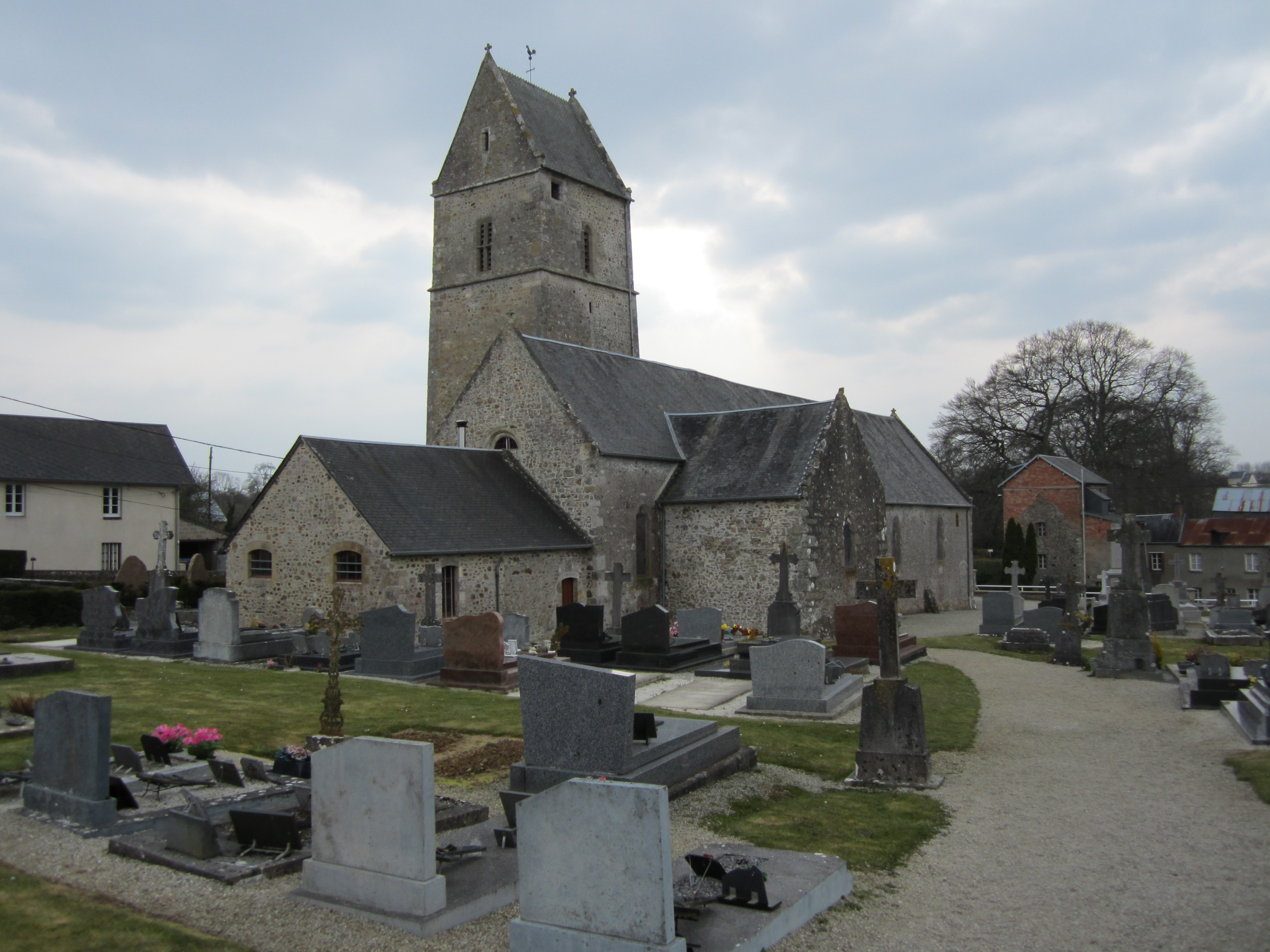
- The church of Saint-Pierre
- Location of Muneville-le-Bingard
- Location within France Location within Normandy
- Coordinates: 49°07′18″N 1°28′41″W
- Country: France
- Region: Normandy
- Department: Manche
- Arrondissement: Coutances
- Canton: Agon-Coutainville

Government
  - Mayor (2020–2026): Hubert Robiolle
- Area^{1}: 19.81 km^{2} (7.65 sq mi)
- Elevation: 48 m (157 ft)
- Highest elevation: 80 m (260 ft)
- Lowest elevation: 23 m (75 ft)
- Population (2023): 725
  - Density: 36.6/km^{2} (94.8/sq mi)
- Time zone: UTC+01:00 (CET)
  - Summer (DST): UTC+02:00 (CEST)
- INSEE/Postal code: 50364 /50490
- ^{1} French Land Register data, which excludes lakes, ponds, glaciers > 1 km^{2} (0.386 sq mi or 247 acres) and river estuaries.

Muneville-le-Bingard (French pronunciation: [mynvil lə bɛ̃ɡaʁ]) is a commune in the Manche department in Normandy in north-western France.

== See also ==
- Communes of the Manche department
