= Blainville-sur-Mer =

- Commune
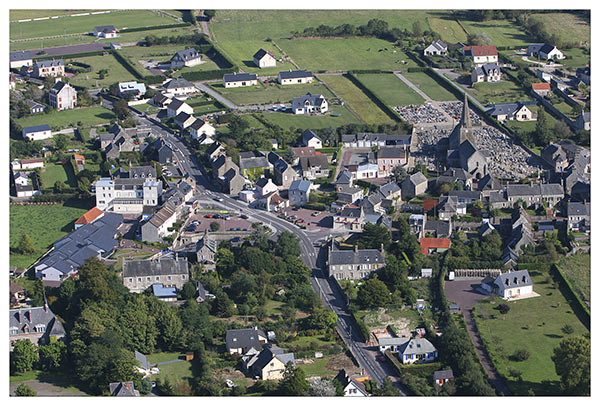
- Aerial view of the town
- Location of Blainville-sur-Mer
- Location within France Location within Normandy
- Coordinates: 49°04′02″N 1°34′55″W
- Country: France
- Region: Normandy
- Department: Manche
- Arrondissement: Coutances
- Canton: Agon-Coutainville

Government
  - Mayor (2020–2026): Louis Teyssier
- Area^{1}: 11.60 km^{2} (4.48 sq mi)
- Elevation: 11 m (36 ft)
- Highest elevation: 67 m (220 ft)
- Lowest elevation: 1 m (3.3 ft)
- Population (2023): 1,600
  - Density: 140/km^{2} (360/sq mi)
- Time zone: UTC+01:00 (CET)
  - Summer (DST): UTC+02:00 (CEST)
- INSEE/Postal code: 50058 /50560
- ^{1} French Land Register data, which excludes lakes, ponds, glaciers > 1 km^{2} (0.386 sq mi or 247 acres) and river estuaries.

Blainville-sur-Mer (French pronunciation: [blɛ̃vil syʁ mɛʁ], literally Blainville on Sea) is a commune in the Manche department in the Normandy region in northwestern France.

== Population ==
Historical population
Year	Pop.	±% p.a.
1968	974	—
1975	953	−0.31%
1982	1,016	+0.92%
1990	1,113	+1.15%
1999	1,319	+1.90%
2007	1,596	+2.41%
2012	1,564	−0.40%
2017	1,653	+1.11%
2023	1,600	−0.54%
Source: INSEE

== See also ==
- Communes of the Manche department
