= Gouville-sur-Mer =

- Commune
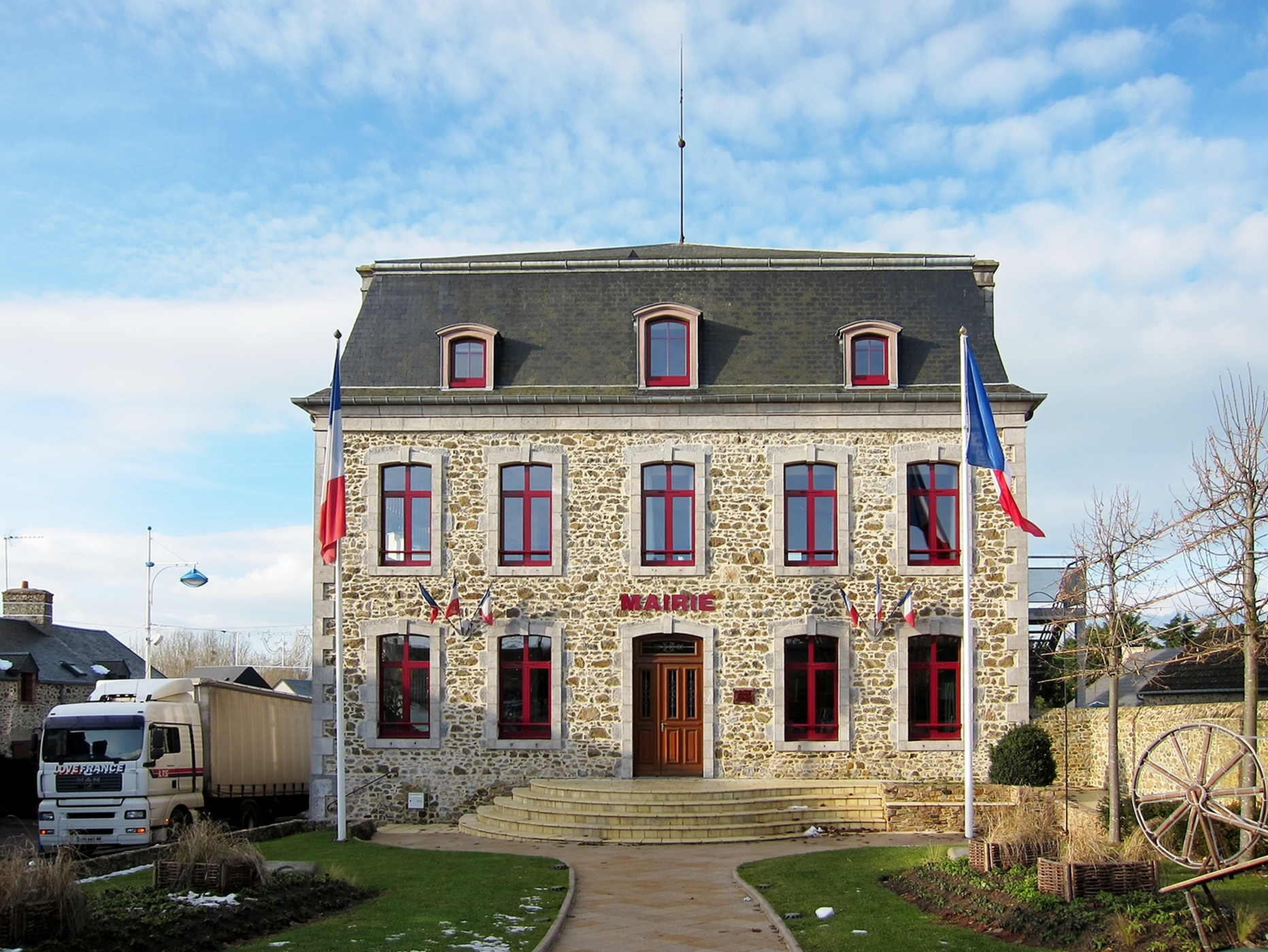
- Town hall
- Location of Gouville-sur-Mer
- Location within France Location within Normandy
- Coordinates: 49°05′53″N 1°34′45″W
- Country: France
- Region: Normandy
- Department: Manche
- Arrondissement: Coutances
- Canton: Agon-Coutainville
- Intercommunality: Coutances Mer et Bocage

Government
  - Mayor (2020–2026): François Legras
- Area^{1}: 34.55 km^{2} (13.34 sq mi)
- Highest elevation: 98 m (322 ft)
- Lowest elevation: 0 m (0 ft)
- Population (2023): 3,274
  - Density: 94.76/km^{2} (245.4/sq mi)
- Demonym: Gouvillais
- Time zone: UTC+01:00 (CET)
  - Summer (DST): UTC+02:00 (CEST)
- INSEE/Postal code: 50215 /50560
- Website: www.gouville-sur-mer.fr
- ^{1} French Land Register data, which excludes lakes, ponds, glaciers > 1 km^{2} (0.386 sq mi or 247 acres) and river estuaries.

Gouville-sur-Mer (French pronunciation: [ɡuvil syʁ mɛʁ], literally Gouville on Sea) is a commune in the Manche department in north-western France. On 1 January 2016, the former commune of Boisroger was merged into Gouville-sur-Mer. On 1 January 2019, the former communes of Anneville-sur-Mer, Montsurvent and Servigny were merged into Gouville-sur-Mer.

== Population ==
Population data refer to the area corresponding with the commune as of January 2025.

Historical population
Year	Pop.	±% p.a.
1968	1,905	—
1975	1,852	−0.40%
1982	1,930	+0.59%
1990	2,081	+0.95%
1999	2,474	+1.94%
2007	2,982	+2.36%
2012	3,031	+0.33%
2017	3,173	+0.92%
2023	3,274	+0.52%
Source: INSEE

== Heraldry ==
Arms of Gouville-sur-Mer	The arms of Gouville-sur-Mer are blazoned : Per pale 1: Vert, in pale 3 cocks Or, crested gules, 2nd one contourny; 2: Azure, a lighthouse argent pierced and masoned sable, enflamed Or, arising from a rock from a bar wavy couped (wave) argent.

== Climate ==
Climate data for Gouville (2003–2020 normals, extremes 2003–present)
Month	Jan	Feb	Mar	Apr	May	Jun	Jul	Aug	Sep	Oct	Nov	Dec	Year
Record high °C (°F)	15.1 (59.2)	20.4 (68.7)	24.0 (75.2)	27.8 (82.0)	30.6 (87.1)	34.2 (93.6)	37.9 (100.2)	35.0 (95.0)	33.3 (91.9)	28.6 (83.5)	21.3 (70.3)	16.1 (61.0)	37.9 (100.2)
Mean daily maximum °C (°F)	8.8 (47.8)	9.2 (48.6)	11.5 (52.7)	14.8 (58.6)	17.3 (63.1)	20.1 (68.2)	22.1 (71.8)	21.8 (71.2)	20.3 (68.5)	16.8 (62.2)	12.7 (54.9)	9.6 (49.3)	15.4 (59.7)
Daily mean °C (°F)	6.5 (43.7)	6.5 (43.7)	8.2 (46.8)	10.8 (51.4)	13.5 (56.3)	16.5 (61.7)	18.3 (64.9)	18.4 (65.1)	16.6 (61.9)	13.7 (56.7)	10.0 (50.0)	7.2 (45.0)	12.2 (54.0)
Mean daily minimum °C (°F)	4.3 (39.7)	3.8 (38.8)	5.0 (41.0)	6.8 (44.2)	9.8 (49.6)	12.8 (55.0)	14.6 (58.3)	14.9 (58.8)	12.8 (55.0)	10.6 (51.1)	7.4 (45.3)	4.8 (40.6)	9.0 (48.2)
Record low °C (°F)	−7.7 (18.1)	−8.7 (16.3)	−4.9 (23.2)	−2.1 (28.2)	0.3 (32.5)	5.1 (41.2)	6.6 (43.9)	7.0 (44.6)	3.4 (38.1)	0.4 (32.7)	−5.3 (22.5)	−5.9 (21.4)	−8.7 (16.3)
Average precipitation mm (inches)	94.4 (3.72)	67.5 (2.66)	62.2 (2.45)	47.6 (1.87)	51.7 (2.04)	49.0 (1.93)	49.5 (1.95)	68.6 (2.70)	51.6 (2.03)	92.6 (3.65)	103.9 (4.09)	106.2 (4.18)	844.8 (33.26)
Average precipitation days (≥ 1.0 mm)	16.3	12.8	11.4	8.9	9.2	7.2	8.8	9.8	8.3	13.4	15.4	15.8	137.1
Source: Meteociel

== See also ==
- Communes of the Manche department
