= Servigny =

- Part of Gouville-sur-Mer
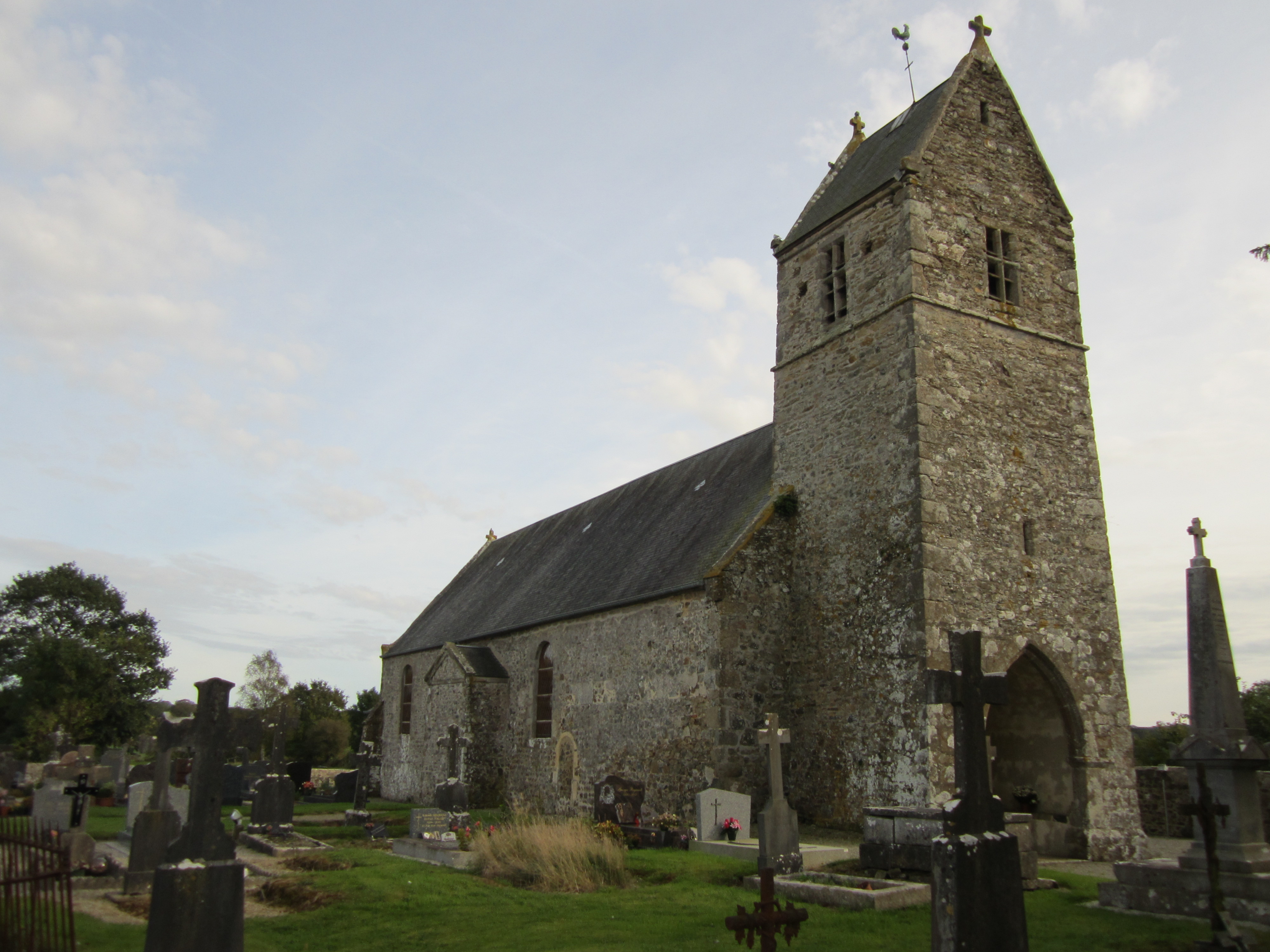
- The church of Saint-Jean-Baptiste
- Location of Servigny
- Location within France Location within Normandy
- Coordinates: 49°05′40″N 1°28′23″W
- Country: France
- Region: Normandy
- Department: Manche
- Arrondissement: Coutances
- Canton: Coutances
- Commune: Gouville-sur-Mer
- Area^{1}: 3.95 km^{2} (1.53 sq mi)
- Elevation: 76 m (249 ft)
- Highest elevation: 98 m (322 ft)
- Lowest elevation: 49 m (161 ft)
- Population (2022): 191
  - Density: 48.4/km^{2} (125/sq mi)
- Demonym: Servignais
- Time zone: UTC+01:00 (CET)
  - Summer (DST): UTC+02:00 (CEST)
- Postal code: 50200
- ^{1} French Land Register data, which excludes lakes, ponds, glaciers > 1 km^{2} (0.386 sq mi or 247 acres) and river estuaries.

Servigny (French pronunciation: [sɛʁviɲi]) is a former commune in the Manche department in Normandy in north-western France. On 1 January 2019, it was merged into the commune Gouville-sur-Mer.

== See also ==
- Communes of the Manche department
