= Nay, Manche =

Nay
- Commune
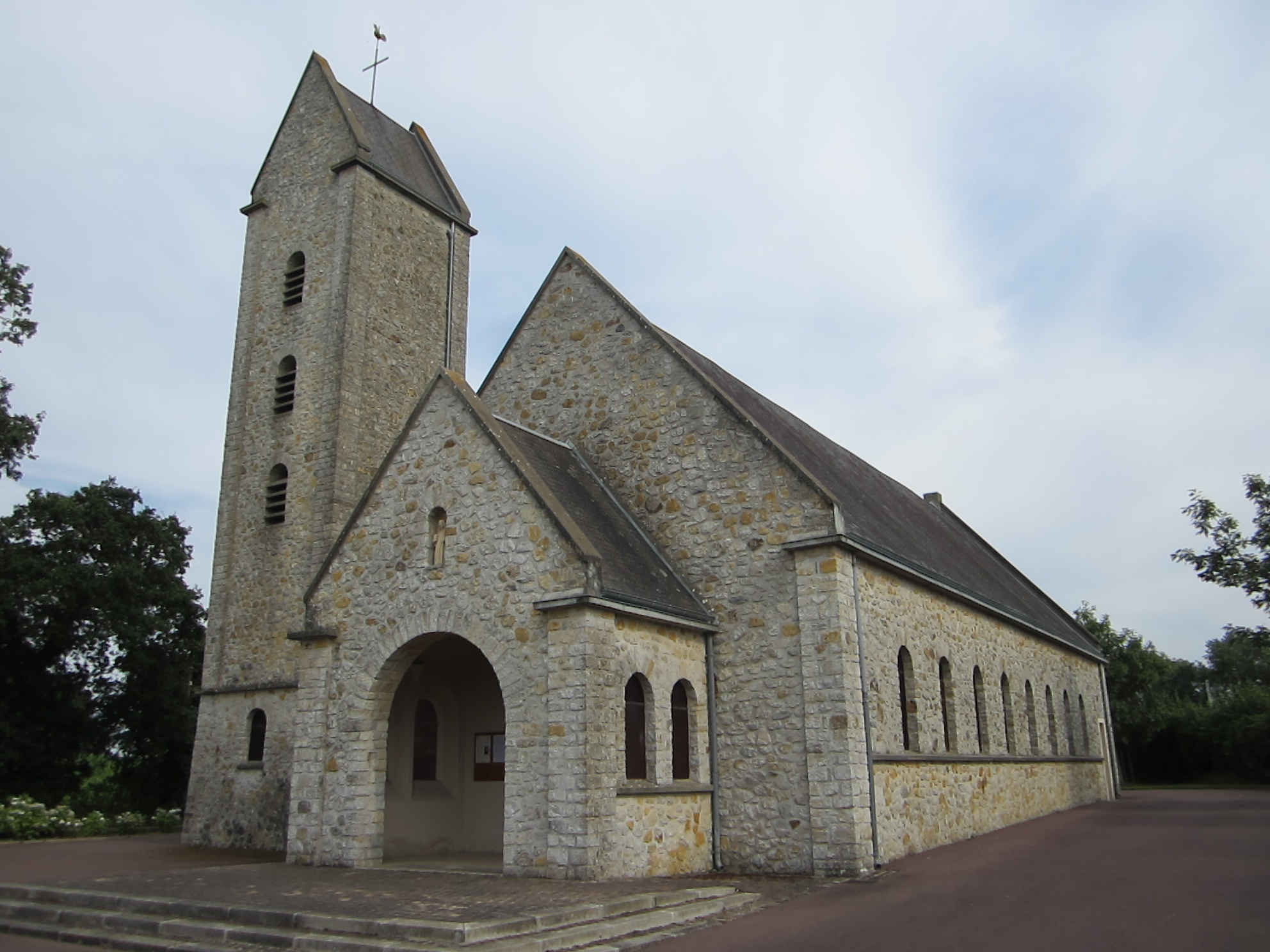
- The church of Saint-Pierre
- Location of Nay
- Location within France Location within Normandy
- Coordinates: 49°14′25″N 1°22′20″W
- Country: France
- Region: Normandy
- Department: Manche
- Arrondissement: Coutances
- Canton: Agon-Coutainville

Government
  - Mayor (2020–2026): Daniel Nicolle
- Area^{1}: 2.51 km^{2} (0.97 sq mi)
- Elevation: 11 m (36 ft)
- Highest elevation: 13 m (43 ft)
- Lowest elevation: 2 m (6.6 ft)
- Population (2023): 70
  - Density: 28/km^{2} (72/sq mi)
- Demonym: Nayons
- Time zone: UTC+01:00 (CET)
  - Summer (DST): UTC+02:00 (CEST)
- INSEE/Postal code: 50368 /50190
- ^{1} French Land Register data, which excludes lakes, ponds, glaciers > 1 km^{2} (0.386 sq mi or 247 acres) and river estuaries.

Nay is a commune in the Manche department in Normandy in north-western France.

== Toponymy ==
The town name is first attested under the forms Nas, Naei, without date.

According to Albert Dauzat, there are two possible etymologies:

- Either *Nadium (fundum) from the Gallic msculine name *Nadius;
- From the Gaulish words novio (‘new’) and *ialo- (‘field, clearing’; cognate to Yale and Yell, Shetland).

The name in local dialect is Nayons.

== See also ==
- Communes of the Manche department
