= Périers, Manche =

Périers
- Commune
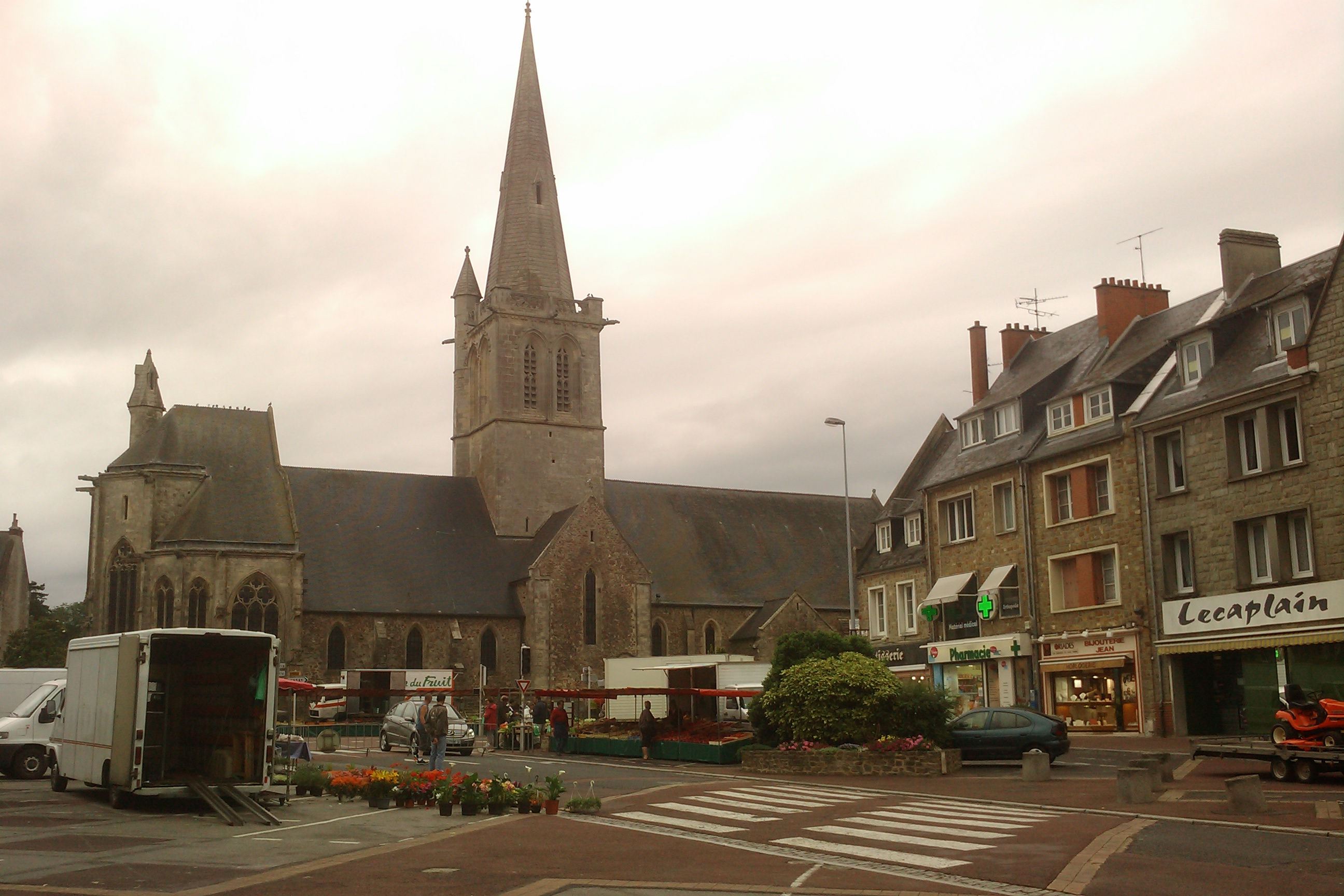
- The church of Saint-Pierre-et-Saint-Paul on market day

- Coat of arms
- Location of Périers
- Location within France Location within Normandy
- Coordinates: 49°11′14″N 1°24′22″W
- Country: France
- Region: Normandy
- Department: Manche
- Arrondissement: Coutances
- Canton: Agon-Coutainville

Government
  - Mayor (2020–2026): Gabriel Daube
- Area^{1}: 14.62 km^{2} (5.64 sq mi)
- Elevation: 29 m (95 ft)
- Highest elevation: 36 m (118 ft)
- Lowest elevation: 6 m (20 ft)
- Population (2023): 2,376
  - Density: 162.5/km^{2} (420.9/sq mi)
- Time zone: UTC+01:00 (CET)
  - Summer (DST): UTC+02:00 (CEST)
- INSEE/Postal code: 50394 /50190
- ^{1} French Land Register data, which excludes lakes, ponds, glaciers > 1 km^{2} (0.386 sq mi or 247 acres) and river estuaries.

Périers (in Norman: Pri) [peʁje] is a commune in the Manche department in Normandy in north-western France.

== History ==
Périers was liberated by the 2nd Battalion, 359th Infantry Regiment, 90th Division, of the United States Army, on 27 July 1944.

== Population ==
Historical population
Year	Pop.	±% p.a.
1968	2,586	—
1975	2,712	+0.68%
1982	2,741	+0.15%
1990	2,566	−0.82%
1999	2,553	−0.06%
2007	2,437	−0.58%
2012	2,355	−0.68%
2017	2,259	−0.83%
2023	2,376	+0.85%
Source: INSEE

== Heraldry ==
Arms of Périers	The arms of Périers are blazoned : Argent, a pear tree eradicated vert and in base a barrulet gules, overall on a bend azure between 2 lions sable, 3 mullets pierced (spur-rowels) Or.

== See also ==
- Communes of the Manche department
