= Canton of Agon-Coutainville =

Coordinates: 49.04°N 1.59°W

Agon-Coutainville
- Canton
- Interactive map of Agon-Coutainville
- Country: France
- Region: Normandy
- Department: Manche
- No. of communes: {{{nbcomm}}}

Government
  - Representatives (2021–2028): Isabelle Bouyer Maupas; Damien Pillon
- Area: 276.39 km^{2} (106.71 sq mi)
- Population (2023): 18,890
  - Density: 68.35/km^{2} (177.0/sq mi)
- INSEE code: 50 01

The canton of Agon-Coutainville is an administrative division of the Manche department, northwestern France. It was created at the French canton reorganisation which came into effect in March 2015. Its seat is in Agon-Coutainville.

== Composition ==
It consists of the following communes:

1. Agon-Coutainville
2. Auxais
3. Blainville-sur-Mer
4. Feugères
5. Geffosses
6. Gonfreville
7. Gorges
8. Gouville-sur-Mer
9. Hauteville-la-Guichard
10. Marchésieux
11. Montcuit
12. Muneville-le-Bingard
13. Nay
14. Périers
15. Raids
16. Saint-Germain-sur-Sèves
17. Saint-Malo-de-la-Lande
18. Saint-Martin-d'Aubigny
19. Saint-Sauveur-Villages
20. Saint-Sébastien-de-Raids

== Councillors ==
Election	Councillors	Party	Occupation
2015	Gabriel Daube	UDI	Mayor of Périers
2015	Dominique Larsonneur-Morel	LR	Territorial Technical Assistant in High School

== Pictures of the canton ==
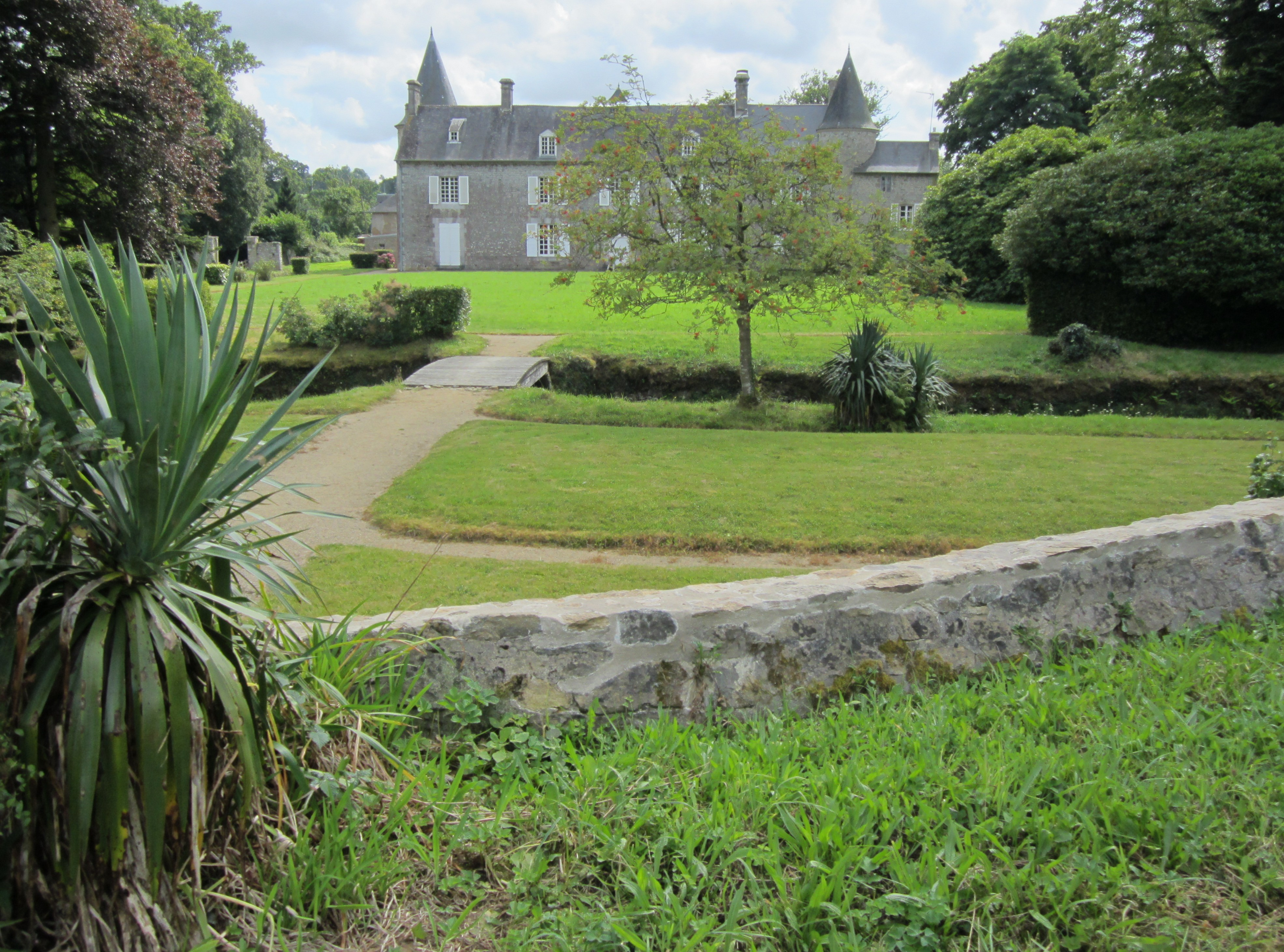
Garden of the Montcuit House

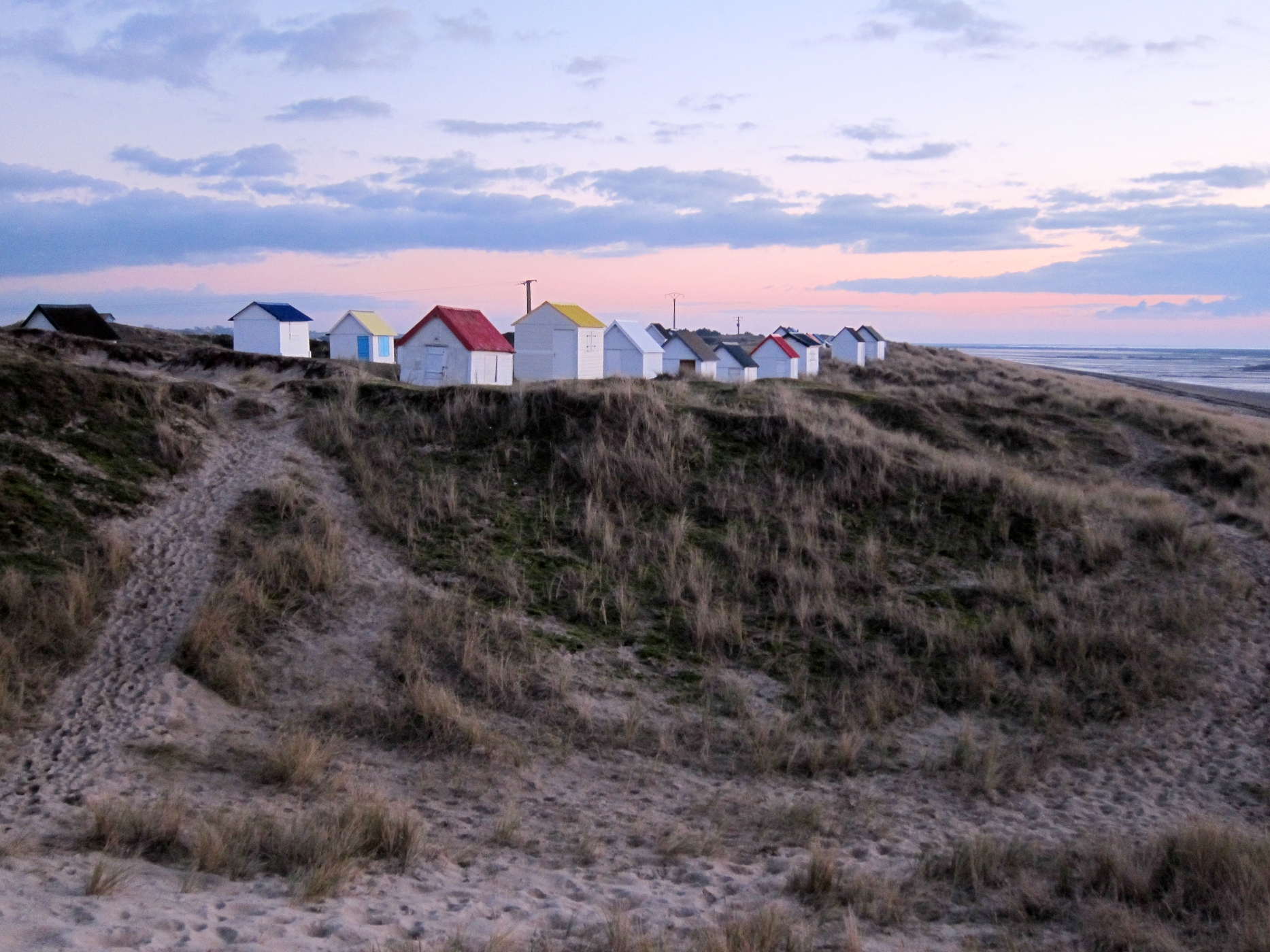
Beach in Gouville-sur-Mer
