= List of shipwrecks in September 1862 =

The list of shipwrecks in September 1862 includes ships sunk, foundered, grounded, or otherwise lost during September 1862.

== 1 September ==
List of shipwrecks: 1 September 1862
Ship	State	Description
Frederick der Grosse	Flag unknown	The ship was wrecked on the Saint Rocks. She was on a voyage from Quebec City, Province of Canada, British North America to Hull, Yorkshire, United Kingdom. She was refloated on 8 September and towed in to Quebec City by the steamship James McKenzie ( (United Kingdom of Great Britain and Ireland) British North America).
Lord Worsley	(United Kingdom of Great Britain and Ireland) New Zealand	The steamer grounded fore and aft 11 nautical miles (20 km) south of Cape Egmont, Taranaki. Passengers and crew were landed safely with the help of Māori from a local pa, despite the fact that a state of war existed between colonials and natives along the Taranaki coast.
Zepherine	(United Kingdom of Great Britain and Ireland) British North America	The ship foundered in Lake Ontario. Her crew were rescued.

== 2 September ==
List of shipwrecks: 2 September 1862
Ship	State	Description
Catharina	United Kingdom	The ship was driven ashore on Saltholm, Denmark.
Empire of Peace	United Kingdom	The ship was damaged by fire at Demerara, British Honduras.
Gypsy	United States	The 113-ton sternwheel paddle steamer struck at snag and sank in the Sacramento River near Ludgkin's Ranch, 20 miles (32 km) below Sacramento, California.
Hart	United Kingdom	The ship was driven ashore on Saltholm.
Patica	United Kingdom	The barque foundered with the loss of five of her crew. Survivors were rescued by Washington (United States).

== 3 September ==
List of shipwrecks: 3 September 1862
Ship	State	Description
Adrian	United Kingdom	The schooner ran aground in the Castletown River. She was run into on 8 September by the brigantine Constant, which was damaged. Adrian was held to be at fault as she was not showing any lights at night.
Enterprise	United Kingdom	The ship was driven ashore near Rønne, Denmark. She was on a voyage from "Holmesdale" to Danzig.
HMS Espoir	Royal Navy	The Philomel-class gunvessel ran aground in the Niger River.
Lockett	United Kingdom	The ship ran aground at Victoria, Colony of British Columbia. She was on a voyage from London to Victoria.
Malvina	United Kingdom	The ship ran aground on the Ship Rock, off the coast of County Down and broke in two.
Silver Lake	United States	The 70-ton sternwheel paddle steamer burned on the Osage River in Missouri.
W. B. Terry	United States	American Civil War: The steamship ran aground in the Tennessee River 100 nautical miles (190 km) upstream of its mouth. She was consequently captured by the Confederates.

== 4 September ==
List of shipwrecks: 4 September 1862
Ship	State	Description
Foam	United Kingdom	The ship ran aground on the North Rock, off the coast of County Down. She was refloated.
Gem	United Kingdom	The brig collided with Marie Josephine (Portugal) and was abandoned. Her crew were rescued by Marie Josephine. Gem was on a voyage from Drogheda, County Louth to Liverpool, Lancashire.
Hannibal City	United States	The 563-ton sidewheel paddle steamer struck a snag and sank in the Mississippi River 8 miles (13 km) below Louisiana, Missouri.
Lavinia	United Kingdom	The schooner was abandoned in the Atlantic Ocean off the south coast of Spain. She subsequently sank. She was on a voyage from Huelva, Spain to Liverpool.
Polyxena	United Kingdom	The ship collided with Divinite (United Kingdom) and sank. Her crew were rescued. She was on a voyage from Poole, Dorset to Dordrecht, South Holland, Netherlands.

== 5 September ==
List of shipwrecks: 5 September 1862
Ship	State	Description
King of the Forest	United Kingdom	The ship ran aground at Aberavon, Glamorgan. She was on a voyage from Newport, Monmouthshire to Liverpool, Lancashire.
Ocmulgee	United States	American Civil War, CSS Alabama's Eastern Atlantic Expeditionary Raid: The 454-ton whaler, a full-rigged ship, was captured and burned in the Atlantic Ocean near the Azores by the screw sloop-of-war CSS Alabama (Confederate States Navy).

== 6 September ==
List of shipwrecks: 6 September 1862
Ship	State	Description
Armistad	Spain	The barque was wrecked at Manila, Spanish East Indies.
Dauntless	(United Kingdom of Great Britain and Ireland) British North America	The tug was run into by the steamship Adventure (United Kingdom) and severely damaged at Saint John's, Newfoundland.
Estrella	Spain	The brig was wrecked at Manila.
Livingstone	United Kingdom	The ship departed from New York for the Clyde. No further trace, presumed foundered with the loss of all hands.
Manuelita	Spain	The barque was wrecked at Manila.
Nabob	United States	The full-rigged ship was wrecked at Manila with the loss of eighteen of the 32 people on board.
Picket	United States Army	American Civil War: The screw gunboat was struck by Confederate artillery shells and blown up on the Pamlico River at Washington, North Carolina, killing 20 members of her crew. The armed screw steamer USS Louisiana (United States Navy) rescued her surviving crew members. Union forces later stripped and burned her wreck.
San José	Spain	The brig was wrecked at Manila.

== 7 September ==
List of shipwrecks: 7 September 1862
Ship	State	Description
Diamant	United Kingdom	The ship foundered off Haiti. She was on a voyage from Liverpool, Lancashire to Havana, Cuba.
Starlight	United States	American Civil War, CSS Alabama's Eastern Atlantic Expeditionary Raid: The schooner, was captured and burned in the Atlantic Ocean near the Azores by the screw sloop-of-war CSS Alabama (Confederate States Navy).

== 8 September ==
List of shipwrecks: 8 September 1862
Ship	State	Description
Ocean Rover	United States	American Civil War, CSS Alabama's Eastern Atlantic Expeditionary Raid: The 313-ton whaler, a full-rigged ship carrying a cargo of 1,100 barrels of whale oil, was captured and burned in the Atlantic Ocean near Flores Island, Azores by the screw sloop-of-war CSS Alabama (Confederate States Navy).
Volante	(United Kingdom of Great Britain and Ireland) British North America	The brig ran aground on the South Shoals, off Little Egg Harbour, New Jersey, United States and was wrecked. She was on a voyage from Newcastle upon Tyne, Northumberland to Philadelphia, Pennsylvania, United States.

== 9 September ==
List of shipwrecks: 9 September 1862
Ship	State	Description
Alert	United States	American Civil War, CSS Alabama's Eastern Atlantic Expeditionary Raid: The 398-ton whaler, a barque carrying a cargo of clothes, tobacco, and other goods, was captured and burned in the Atlantic Ocean near the Azores at 39°37′N 31°05′W by the screw sloop-of-war CSS Alabama (Confederate States Navy).
Annette	United Kingdom	The ship was driven ashore on Eierland, North Holland, Netherlands. She was on a voyage from Middlesbrough, Yorkshire to Weener, Kingdom of Hanover. She was refloated and taken in to "Roggersloot".
Weather Gauge	United States	American Civil War, CSS Alabama's Eastern Atlantic Expeditionary Raid: The whaler, a schooner, was captured and burned in the Atlantic Ocean near the Azores by the screw sloop-of-war CSS Alabama (Confederate States Navy).
Yermak (Ермак)	Russia	Second Kara Sea expedition of Otto Paul von Krusenstern: The schooner was trapped by ice and abandoned by her crew in the Kara Sea west of Yamal Peninsula, at approx. 69°57′N 66°2′E. The crew made it to land across ice on 16 September.

== 10 September ==
List of shipwrecks: 10 September 1862
Ship	State	Description
Revere	Unknown	The schooner burned off Beaufort, South Carolina, Confederate States of America.
Thérèse	France	The ship was driven ashore on Long Island, New York, United States. She was on a voyage from New York City to Queenstown, County Cork, United Kingdom.
USS Tigress	United States Navy	The armed tug sank after colliding with the steamer State of Maine (United States) in the Potomac River off Indian Head, Maryland.

== 11 September ==
List of shipwrecks: 11 September 1862
Ship	State	Description
Britannia	United Kingdom	The ship was wrecked at Thisted, Denmark. Her crew were rescued. She was on a voyage from Hartlepool, County Durham to Kronstadt, Russia.
Eduardo	(United Kingdom of Great Britain and Ireland) British Honduras	The schooner was driven ashore in Sandy Bay. She was on a voyage from New York, United States to Lisbon, Portugal. She was refloated and taken in to Gibraltar in a waterlogged condition.

== 12 September ==
List of shipwrecks: 12 September 1862
Ship	State	Description
Providencia	Spain	The ship caught fire at Havana, Cuba and was scuttled. She was refloated on 26 September.

== 13 September ==
List of shipwrecks: 13 September 1862
Ship	State	Description
Altamaha	United States	American Civil War, CSS Alabama's Eastern Atlantic Expeditionary Raid: The 119-ton whaler, a brig, was captured and burned in the Atlantic Ocean near the Azores at 40°34′00″N 35°24′15″W by the screw sloop-of-war CSS Alabama (Confederate States Navy).
Jamieson	United Kingdom	The Mersey Flat sank off Liverpool, Lancashire. Her cre were rescued by the Point of Ayr Lifeboat. She was refloated on 19 September and beached.
Sarah	United Kingdom	The schooner was driven ashore and wrecked at Scotstown Head, Aberdeenshire. Her crew were rescued. She was on a voyage from Seaham, County Durham to Nairn.
Sardine	United Kingdom	The schooner caught fire and was scuttled at Dublin. She was on a voyage from Caernarfon to Antwerp, Belgium. She was refloated on 25 September.
Wilhelm Helebrandt	Lübeck	The ship wrecked near Wasa, Grand Duchy of Finland. Her crew were rescued.

== 14 September ==
List of shipwrecks: 14 September 1862
Ship	State	Description
Benjamin Tucker	United States	American Civil War, CSS Alabama's Eastern Atlantic Expeditionary Raid: The 349-ton whaler, a full-rigged ship, was captured and burned in the Atlantic Ocean near the Azores by the screw sloop-of-war CSS Alabama (Confederate States Navy).
Jameson	United Kingdom	The Mersey Flat sank off the Point of Ayr, Cheshire. Her crew were rescued by the Point of Ayr Lifeboat.
Mariner	(United Kingdom of Great Britain and Ireland) British North America	The ship struck an iceberg and foundered in the Atlantic Ocean. A message in a bottle was washed up on Gometra, Inner Hebrides in December.

== 15 September ==
List of shipwrecks: 15 September 1862
Ship	State	Description
Arctic	Confederate States of America	American Civil War, Union blockade: The schooner was captured and burned in the Great Wicomico River in Maryland by the gunboat USS Thomas Freeborn (United States Navy).
George IV	United Kingdom	The brigantine ran aground on the Blackwater Bank, in the Irish Sea off the coast of County Wexford and was abandoned by her crew, who were rescued by the tug Erin (United Kingdom). George IV was on a voyage from Runcorn, Cheshire to Ross, County Mayo. She floated off and sank 4 nautical miles (7.4 km) off the Tuskar Rock.
Swift	United Kingdom	The ship ran aground off Whitstable, Kent. She was on a voyage from London to Faial Island, Azores. She was refloated and taken in tow to The Swale.

== 16 September ==
List of shipwrecks: 16 September 1862
Ship	State	Description
Courser	United States	American Civil War, CSS Alabama's Eastern Atlantic Expeditionary Raid: The 121-ton whaler was captured, used for target practice, and burned in the Atlantic Ocean 4 or 5 nautical miles (7.4 to 9.3 km) from Flores Island in the Azores by the screw sloop-of-war CSS Alabama (Confederate States Navy).
Susan	United Kingdom	The schooner struck The Manacles and sank. Her crew were rescued. She was on a voyage from Plymouth, Devon to Kingstown, County Dublin.
Zarita	Prussia	The brig collided with Oxenbridge (United Kingdom) and foundered in the English Channel off The Lizard, Cornwall, United Kingdom. Her crew were rescued by Oxenbridge. Zarita was on a voyage from Bristol, Gloucestershire, United Kingdom to Riga, Russia.
Unidentified store ship or light boat	United States	American Civil War, Union blockade: The store ship or light boat ran aground on Beacon Island in Ocracoke Inlet on the coast of North Carolina. Confederate States of America and was burned by USS Fanny (United States Navy).

== 17 September ==
List of shipwrecks: 17 September 1862
Ship	State	Description
Azores	United Kingdom	The ship foundered in the Atlantic Ocean 25 nautical miles (46 km) north east of Cape Cornwall, Cornwall. Her crew were rescued. She was on a voyage from Newport, Monmouthshire to Portland, Maine, United States.
Flinn	United Kingdom	The brig ran aground in the River Tyne.
Fortitude	United Kingdom	The ship was driven ashore at Arkhangelsk, Russia. She was on a voyage from Arkhangelsk to London.
Gremyashchy (Гремящий, 'Thundering')	Imperial Russian Navy	The steamship ran aground at Maly Sommers, about 1 nautical mile (1.9 km) east of Sommers in the Gulf of Finland. She was on her way from Kronstadt to Kalbådagrund to assist an American merchant vessel. Her crew were rescued. She sank on 23 September.
John Bowes	United Kingdom	The steamship ran aground on the River Tyne at Jarrow, Northumberland. She was on a voyage from the River Tyne to London.
Livingstone	United Kingdom	The schooner was wrecked on the Borkum Reef, in the Baltic Sea. She was on a voyage from Eyemouth, Berwickshire to Harburg.
Otter	United Kingdom	The steamship ran aground in the River Tyne. She was on a voyage from the River Tyne to Rotterdam, South Holland, Netherlands.
Sentinel	United Kingdom	The steamship ran aground in the River Tyne. She was on a voyage from the River Tyne to London.
Virginia	United States	CSS Alabama and Virginia. American Civil War, CSS Alabama's Eastern Atlantic Expeditionary Raid: The 346-ton whaler was captured and burned in the Atlantic Ocean near the Azores at 40°03′00″N 32°46′45″W by the screw sloop-of-war CSS Alabama (Confederate States Navy).

== 18 September ==
List of shipwrecks: 18 September 1862
Ship	State	Description
Blue Jacket	United Kingdom	The tug was destroyed by fire in Conception Bay.
Eagle	United Kingdom	The ship collided with another vessel 14 nautical miles (26 km) north north west of Mont Louis, Province of Canada, British North America and was presumed to have foundered.
Elisha Dunbar	United States	American Civil War, CSS Alabama's Eastern Atlantic Expeditionary Raid: The 346-ton whaler, a barque, was captured and burned in the Atlantic Ocean near the Azores at 39°50′00″N 35°25′45″W by the screw sloop-of-war CSS Alabama (Confederate States Navy).
Fanny	United Kingdom	The steamship sprang a leak and was beached at Southwold, Suffolk, where she was wrecked. She was on a voyage from Newcastle upon Tyne, Northumberland to Venice, Kingdom of Lombardy–Venetia.
Fisk	United States	The ship was lost at Cape Norman, Newfoundland, British North America. She was on a voyage from Plymouth, Devon, United Kingdom to Richibucto, New Brunswick, British North America. Her crew were rescued by a French Navy frigate.
Thames	United Kingdom	The ship was driven ashore at "Saint Flaire", British North America. She was on a voyage from Montreal, Province of Canada, British North America to London.

== 19 September ==
List of shipwrecks: 19 September 1862
Ship	State	Description
Anglia	United Kingdom	The steamship ran aground off Folly Island, South Carolina, Confederate States of America. She was on a voyage from Nassau, Bahamas to Philadelphia, Pennsylvania, United States. She had been refloated by 24 September and put back to Nassau.
Clara	United Kingdom	The ship was driven ashore at Staithes, Yorkshire. She was on a voyage from Middlesbrough, Yorkshire to London. She was refloated the next day with the assistance of the tug Esk (United Kingdom) and resumed her voyage.
Elizabeth	United Kingdom	The ship was wrecked in the Gaspar Strait.
Jens Sarsen	Norway	The ship was wrecked near Husum, Duchy of Holstein.
Lolland	Norway	The ship was driven ashore on "Carlso Island".
Richard Reynolds	United Kingdom	The ship ran aground on the Lyseground, in the Baltic Sea. She was on a voyage from Kronstadt, Russia to Poole, Dorset. She was refloated and taken in to Helsingør, Denmark in a leaky condition.
Therese	United Kingdom	The ship was driven ashore in Jones Inlet. She was on a voyage from New York, United States to Queenstown, County Cork. She was refloated on 24 September and towed back to New York.

== 20 September ==
List of shipwrecks: 20 September 1862
Ship	State	Description
Adelaide	United Kingdom	The brig ran aground near the Hook Lighthouse, County Dublin. She was on a voyage from New York, United States to Dublin. She was refloated with assistance from the steamship Tintern (United Kingdom).
Triton	United Kingdom	The ship was run into by Hylton Maid (United Kingdom) and sank in the North Sea 20 nautical miles (37 km) east of Hartlepool, County Durham. Her six crew were rescued by Hylton Maid. Triton was on a voyage from South Shields, County Durham to Teignmouth, Devon.
White Cloud	United States	The schooner foundered in the Atlantic Ocean with the loss of all thirteen crew.

== 21 September ==
List of shipwrecks: 21 September 1862
Ship	State	Description
Ocean	France	The ship was wrecked at Saint-Germain-sur-Ay, Manche. She was on a voyage from Llanelly, Glamorgan, United Kingdom to Saint-Germain-sur-Ay.
Waverley	United States	The clipper departed from Coringa for Calcutta, India. No further trace.

== 22 September ==
List of shipwrecks: 22 September 1862
Ship	State	Description
Cruz V	Portugal	The barque was driven ashore and damaged at Dungeness, Kent, United Kingdom. Her fourteen crew were rescued by the Dungeness Lifeboat. She was on a voyage from Hamburg to Porto. She was refloated on 26 September and assisted in to Ramsgate, Kent in a leaky condition.
Otto Hermann	Stettin	The ship was driven ashore and sank at Cromer, Norfolk, United Kingdom. She was on a voyage from Stettin to Havre de Grâce, Seine-Inférieure, France.

== 23 September ==
List of shipwrecks: 23 September 1862
Ship	State	Description
Asia	United Kingdom	The brig ran aground at Sunderland, County Durham. She was on a voyage from Sunderland to Hamburg. She was refloated and resumed her voyage in a leaky condition but was consequently beached at Grimsby, Lincolnshire.
Ceres	United Kingdom	The ship was driven ashore at Great Yarmouth, Norfolk. She was refloated.
John Benson	United Kingdom	The schooner ran aground in the Isles of Shoals, United States. She was on a voyage from Pictou, New Brunswick, British North America to Boston, Massachusetts, United States. She was refloated the next day and put in to Portsmouth, New Hampshire in a leaky condition.
Perseverance	United Kingdom	The ship ran aground on the Goodwin Sands, Kent. She was on a voyage from Southampton, Hampshire to Middlesbrough, Yorkshire. She was refloated and resumed her voyage.
Reigate	United Kingdom	The steamship caught fire at London.
Sir William Wallace	United Kingdom	The brig was driven ashore on Hirsholmene, Denmark. She was on a voyage from Amble, Northumberland to Kronstadt, Russia.

== 24 September ==
List of shipwrecks: 24 September 1862
Ship	State	Description
Corinna	United Kingdom	The brig was abandoned in the Atlantic Ocean. Her ten crew survived. She was on a voyage from Quebec City, Province of Canada, British North America to Llanelly, Glamorgan. The vessel's stern came ashore at Brest, Finistère, France on 12 March 1863.
Geneva	United Kingdom	The ship was abandoned in the Atlantic Ocean. Her crew were rescued by the brig Louisa (Prussia). Geneva was on a voyage from Quebec City, Province of Canada, British North America to London. She was discovered by St. Michael (United Kingdom), which put five crew on board with the intention of taking her in to Glasgow, Renfrewshire. Geneva was wrecked on the Mull of Kintyre, Argyllshire on 13 October with the loss of four of her five crew.
Ocean	Prussia	The ship was driven ashore and wrecked at Memel. She was on a voyage from Torrevieja, Spain to Memel.
Phantom	United States	Carrying $10,000,000 in gold and silver ingots from California, the clipper was wrecked on the Tankan Shan Reef off the coast of China.

== 25 September ==
List of shipwrecks: 25 September 1862
Ship	State	Description
Agnes Fraser	United Kingdom	The ship was driven ashore at Bolderāja, Russia. She was on a voyage from Inverkeithing, Fife to Bolderāja. Agnes Fraser was refloated on 27 September and taken in to Riga, Russia.
Falmouth	United Kingdom	The schooner was driven ashore and wrecked at Killyaron Point, Cornwall. She was on a voyage from Pentewan, Cornwall to Runcorn, Cheshire.
Huguary	China	The steamship ran aground in the Yangtze 5 nautical miles (9.3 km) downstream of Tiger Hill, Soochow.
Sophia	United Kingdom	The brig struck the Horse Rock and was beached at Milford Haven, Pembrokeshire. She was on a voyage from Whitehaven, Cumberland to Newport, Monmouthshire.

== 26 September ==
List of shipwrecks: 26 September 1862
Ship	State	Description
Admiral	Russia	The steamship was driven ashore on "Wormsoe Island". All on board were rescued. She was on a voyage from Saint Petersburg to Riga.
John Guynor	United Kingdom	The schooner was run down and sunk in the Atlantic Ocean by E. Z. (United States). Her crew were rescued by E. Z.. John Guynor was on a voyage from Liverpool, Lancashire to New York, United States.
Telegram	United Kingdom	The schooner was driven ashore at Ballyferris Point, County Down. She was on a voyage from Ardrossan, Ayrshire to Marseille, Bouches-du-Rhône, France.
Unidentified schooner	Confederate States of America	American Civil War, Union blockade: Pursued by the paddle steamers USS State of Georgia and USS Mystic (both United States Navy) while attempting to run the Union blockade with a cargo of salt, the schooner ran aground at New Inlet, North Carolina, near Fort Fisher, after which State of Georgia and Mystic destroyed her.

== 27 September ==
List of shipwrecks: 27 September 1862
Ship	State	Description
Emily	United Kingdom	The ship was driven ashore at Dungeness, Kent. She was on a voyage from London to the Cape Coast Castle, Africa. She was refloated and resumed her voyage.
Guiding Star	(United Kingdom of Great Britain and Ireland) New Zealand	The screw steamer struck rocks while leaving the New River, Invercargill, New Zealand. She was driven onto shore to prevent loss of life.
Joseph	Flag unknown	The ship was driven ashore on Hirsholmene, Denmark. She was on a voyage from Newcastle upon Tyne, Northumberland, United Kingdom to Helsingør, Denmark. She was refloated on 1 October and resumed her voyage.
Kate	United Kingdom	The steamship ran aground on the Action Shoal, near Plover Point in the Yangtze, China, and capsized. Her crew were rescued but five passengers were reported missing.
Lady Elgin	(United Kingdom of Great Britain and Ireland) British North America	The steamship ran aground in the Richelieu River and was wrecked.

== 28 September ==
List of shipwrecks: 28 September 1862
Ship	State	Description
Lady Alice Lambton	United Kingdom	The steamship collided with the steamship Henry Morton (United Kingdom) and sank between the Mouse Lightship ( Trinity House) and the Nore. She was on a voyage from Sunderland, County Durham to London.
Lord Palmerston	United Kingdom	The ship was driven ashore on Rathlin Island, County Antrim. She was on a voyage from the Clyde to Mauritius. She was refloated.
Mary Douglas	United Kingdom	The smack sprang a leak off Wick, Caithness. She was on a voyage from Burghead, Moray to Wick. She was run ashore at Dunbeath, Caithness, where she was wrecked.

== 29 September ==
List of shipwrecks: 29 September 1862
Ship	State	Description
Jane and Isabella	United Kingdom	The ship ran aground on the Skerry of Stroma, in the Pentland Firth. She was on a voyage from Fraserburgh, Aberdeenshire to Belfast, County Antrim. She was refloated and taken in to Stromness, Orkney Islands for repairs.
Lord Royston	United Kingdom	The steamship was destroyed by fire in the Bay of Biscay. All seventeen people on board were rescued by the schooner La Gazelle (France). Lord Royston was on a voyage from Bordeaux, Gironde to London.
Ulrica	Sweden	The barque was driven ashore on Skagen, Denmark. She was on a voyage from London, United Kingdom to Christianstad. She had become a wreck by 7 October.

== 30 September ==
List of shipwrecks: 30 September 1862
Ship	State	Description
Albert	United Kingdom	The brig ran aground the Deputy Rock, off the coast of County Down. She was on a voyage from Maryport, Cumberland to Belfast, County Antrim. She was refloated and resumed her voyage.
Bulwark	United Kingdom	The schooner was driven ashore at Groomsport, County Down. She was refloated.
Christian	Norway	The barque collided with another vessel in the English Channel off St Albans Head, Dorset, United Kingdom and was severely damaged. She was on a voyage from Bergen to Bilbao, Spain. She consequently put in to Cowes, Isle of Wight, United Kingdom but was further damaged when she struck The Shingles, off the Isle of Wight.
Surinam	United Kingdom	The ship struck an iceberg and sank in the Strait of Belle Isle. Her crew were rescued. She was on a voyage from Greenock, Renfrewshire to Montreal, Province of Canada, British North America.
Young England	United Kingdom	The steamship was driven ashore and wrecked at Aberystwyth, Cardiganshire.

== Unknown date ==
List of shipwrecks: Unknown date in September 1862
Ship	State	Description
Americana	United Kingdom	The ship was wrecked. She was on a voyage from Bombay, India to a British port.
Atrato	France	The barque was driven ashore near Maranhão, Brazil.
Challenger	United Kingdom	The ship foundered off Cape Race, Newfoundland, British North America.
Damascus	Confederate States of America	American Civil War: Confederate forces scuttled the full-rigged ship as a blockship in the James River near Drewry's Bluff, Virginia.
Dolores	Spain	The brig was abandoned in the South China Sea before 11 September. All 24 people on board took to boat and were rescued six days later by F. Lessing (United Kingdom). Dolores was on a voyage from Manila to Appari, Spanish East Indies.
Dove	United Kingdom	The schooner foundered off Leith, Lothian. Her three crew were rescued by a pilot boat.
Duke of Lancaster	United Kingdom	The ship was wrecked off Formosa. Her crew were rescued. She was on a voyage from Singapore, Straits Settlements to Shanghai, China.
Elizabeth and Jane St. George	United Kingdom	The ship was abandoned in the Atlantic Ocean before 25 September.
G. B. Lamar	United States	The passenger ship was wrecked on Liscombe Island. All on board were rescued. She was on a voyage from the Clyde to New York.
John and Isabella	United Kingdom	The ship was wrecked at Nuevitas, Cuba.
John C. Ives	United Kingdom	The ship was wrecked before 20 September. She was on a voyage from Montreal, Province of Canada, British North America to Liverpool, Lancashire.
John Simonds	Confederate States Army	American Civil War: The steamer was sunk in the Mississippi River.
Lord of the Isles	United Kingdom	The ship caught fire and exploded in the South China Sea 600 nautical miles (1,100 km) off Hong Kong.
Lovely Maria	United Kingdom	The ship was abandoned in the English Channel 18 to 20 nautical miles (33 to 37 km) off Beachy Head, Sussex. She was on a voyage from North Shields, Northumberland to a French port.
Lucy Johnston	United States	The barque was wrecked in Table Bay.
Palm rock	United Kingdom	The ship foundered in the Atlantic Ocean before 14 September. Her crew were rescued. She was on a voyage from Callao, Peru to Cowes, Isle of Wight.
Patrician	United Kingdom	The ship was beached on Green Island, British North America. She was on a voyage from Liverpool, Lancashire to Quebec City, Province of Canada, British North America. She had been refloated by 8 September and towed in to Quebec City by the steamship Samson ( (United Kingdom of Great Britain and Ireland) British North America).
Petica	United Kingdom	The ship foundered in the Atlantic Ocean. She was on a voyage from Montreal, Province of Canada to Glasgow, Renfrewshire.
Prince Jerôme	French Navy	The Prince Jerôme-class transport ship caught fire whilst on a voyage from a French port to Mexico. She put in to Gibraltar.
HMS Revenge	Royal Navy	The Renown-class ship of the line ran aground in the Baltic Sea. She was refloated.
Silver Cloud	United States	The whaler, a schooner, was abandoned in the Indian Ocean before 26 September with the loss of at least three lives.
Susan	United Kingdom	The schooner was wrecked in Table Bay.
Swithamley	United Kingdom	The ship was wrecked on the Blenheim Reef, off the Cape of Good Hope, Cape Colony. Her crew were rescued. She was on a voyage from Bombay to Liverpool.
Volant	Flag unknown	The brig was lost at New Inlet on the coast of North Carolina, Confederate States of America.
Wakefield	United Kingdom	The ship ran aground on a reef off Basilan, Spanish East Indies. She was on a voyage from Manila, Spanish East Indies to London.
Witch of the Sea	United Kingdom	The ship was driven ashore near "Maorie". She was on a voyage from Liverpool to Odesa. She was refloated but found to be severely leaky.
Xiphias	United Kingdom	The ship was wrecked off Cape Francisco. She was on a voyage from Bahia, Brazil to a British port.
Yucatan	United Kingdom	The brig was wrecked on the Bird Rock, the Bahamas before 27 September.
