= La Feuillie =

La Feuillie may refer to the following communes in France:

- La Feuillie, Manche, in the Manche département
- La Feuillie, Seine-Maritime, in the Seine-Maritime département
