= Saint-Nicolas-de-Pierrepont =

- Commune
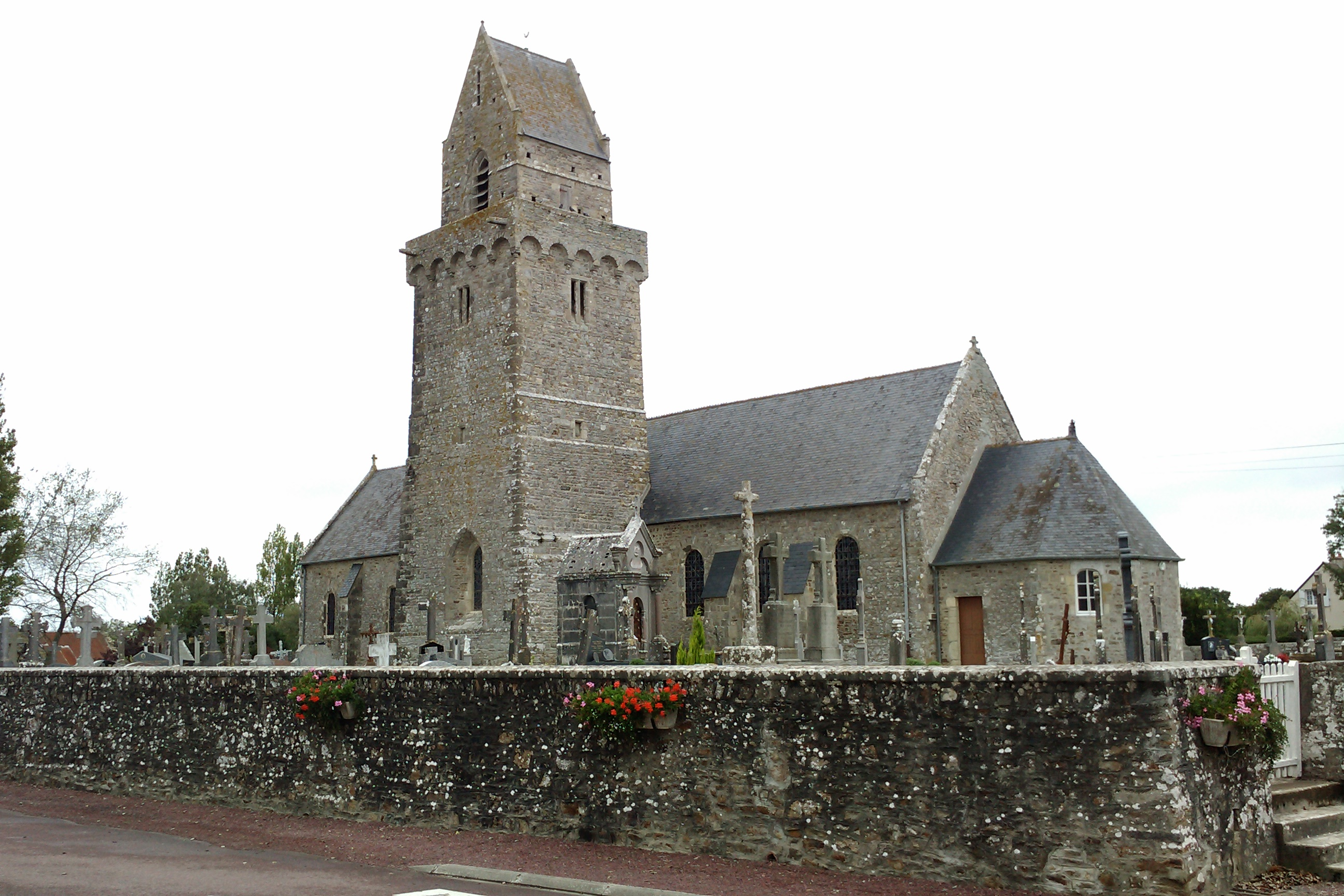
- The church of Saint-Nicolas-de-Pierrepont
- Location of Saint-Nicolas-de-Pierrepont
- Location within France Location within Normandy
- Coordinates: 49°19′27″N 1°35′09″W
- Country: France
- Region: Normandy
- Department: Manche
- Arrondissement: Coutances
- Canton: Créances

Government
  - Mayor (2020–2026): Yves Canonne
- Area^{1}: 8.13 km^{2} (3.14 sq mi)
- Elevation: 32 m (105 ft)
- Highest elevation: 123 m (404 ft)
- Lowest elevation: 7 m (23 ft)
- Population (2023): 296
  - Density: 36.4/km^{2} (94.3/sq mi)
- Time zone: UTC+01:00 (CET)
  - Summer (DST): UTC+02:00 (CEST)
- INSEE/Postal code: 50528 /50250
- ^{1} French Land Register data, which excludes lakes, ponds, glaciers > 1 km^{2} (0.386 sq mi or 247 acres) and river estuaries.

Saint-Nicolas-de-Pierrepont (French pronunciation: [sɛ̃ nikɔla də pjɛʁpɔ̃]) is a commune in the Manche department in Normandy in north-western France. Between 1973 and 1983, it was part of the commune Pierrepont-en-Cotentin.

== See also ==
- Communes of the Manche department
