= Laulne =

- Commune
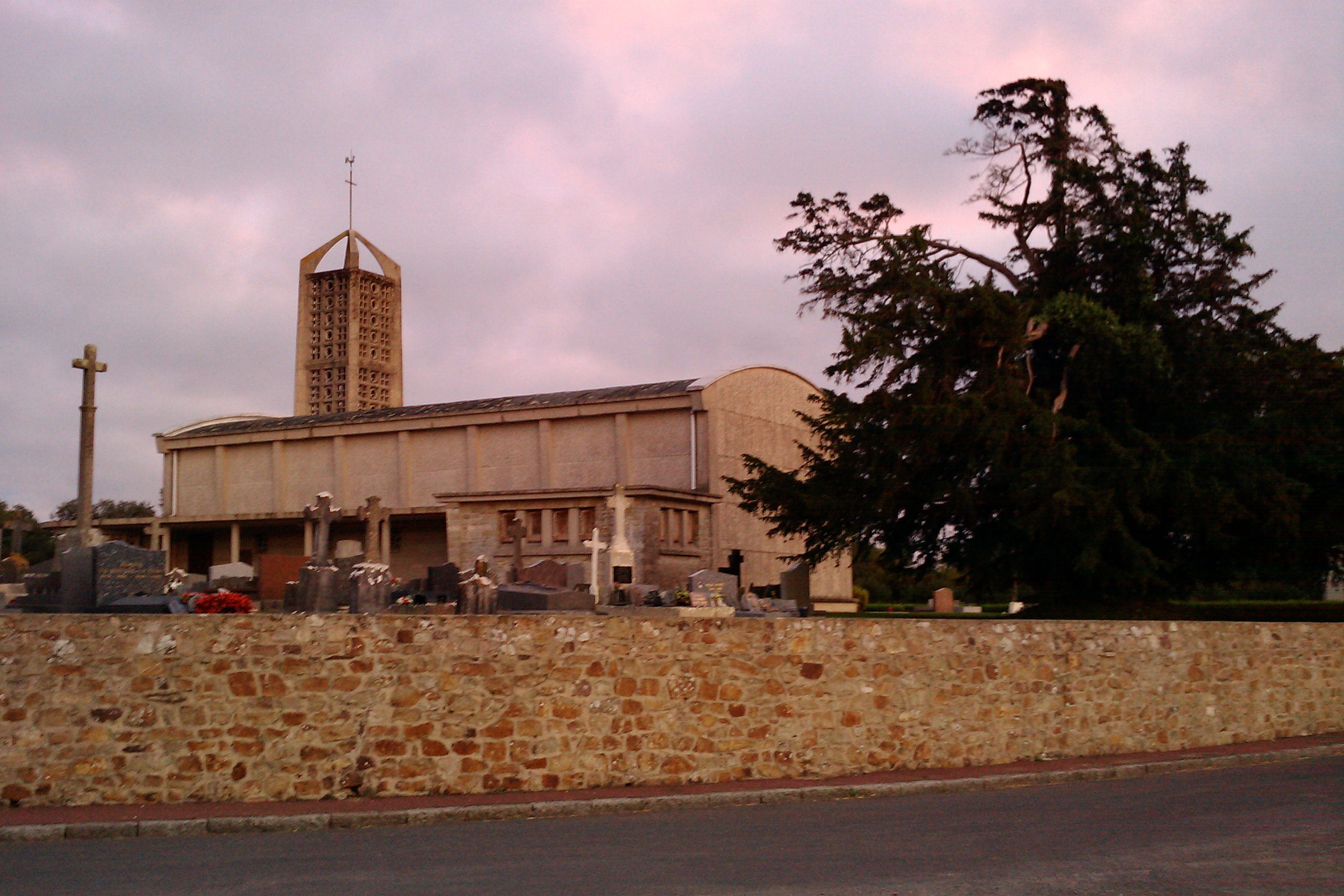
- The church of Saint-Cyr-et-Sainte-Julitte
- Location of Laulne
- Location within France Location within Normandy
- Coordinates: 49°14′45″N 1°27′28″W
- Country: France
- Region: Normandy
- Department: Manche
- Arrondissement: Coutances
- Canton: Créances

Government
  - Mayor (2020–2026): Denis Pépin
- Area^{1}: 9.06 km^{2} (3.50 sq mi)
- Elevation: 50 m (160 ft)
- Highest elevation: 103 m (338 ft)
- Lowest elevation: 13 m (43 ft)
- Population (2023): 186
  - Density: 20.5/km^{2} (53.2/sq mi)
- Time zone: UTC+01:00 (CET)
  - Summer (DST): UTC+02:00 (CEST)
- INSEE/Postal code: 50265 /50430
- ^{1} French Land Register data, which excludes lakes, ponds, glaciers > 1 km^{2} (0.386 sq mi or 247 acres) and river estuaries.

Laulne is a commune in the Manche department in north-western France.

== See also ==
- Communes of the Manche department
