= Le Plessis-Lastelle =

- Commune
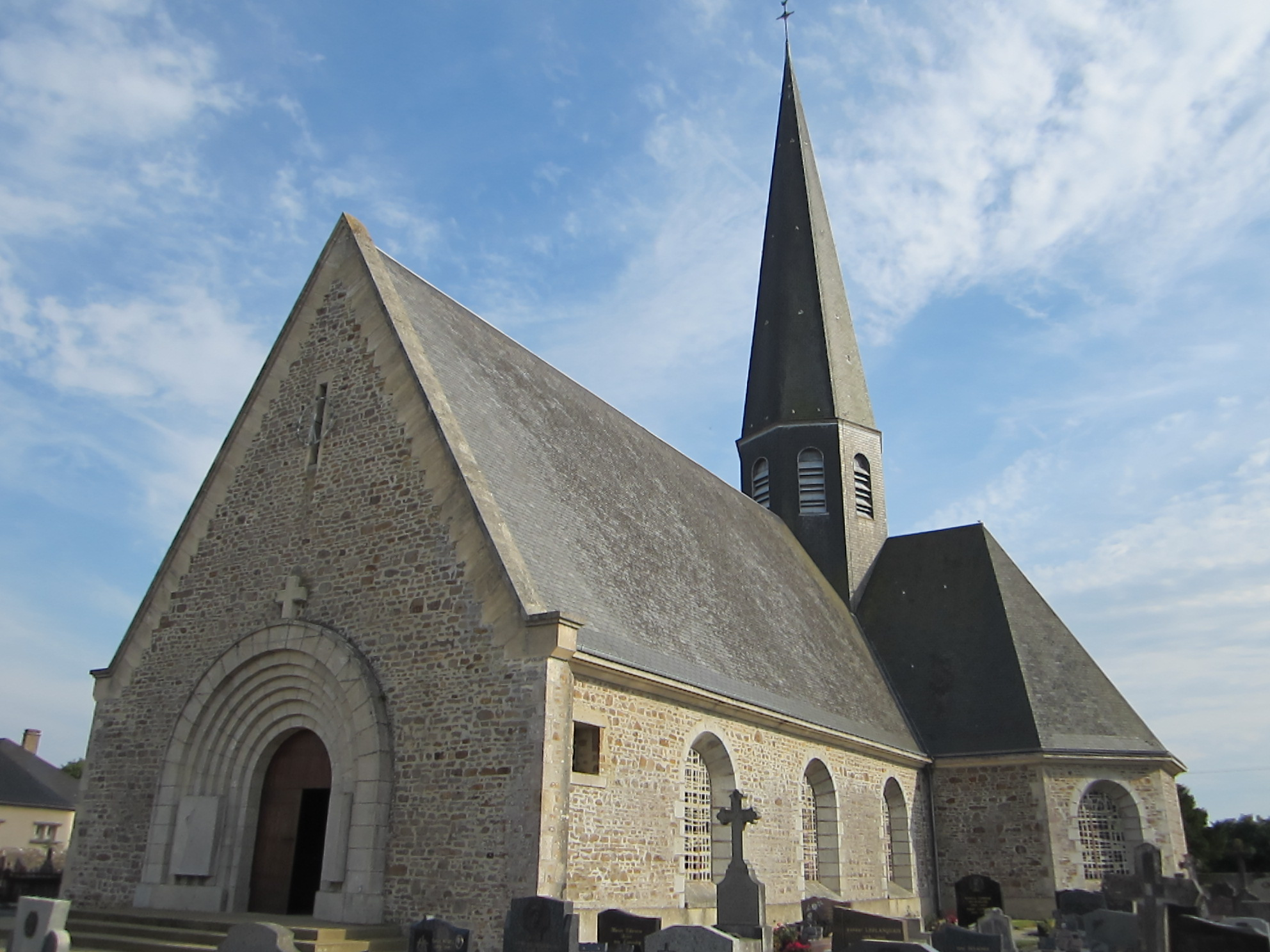
- The church of Saint-Jean-Baptiste
- Location of Le Plessis-Lastelle
- Location within France Location within Normandy
- Coordinates: 49°16′55″N 1°25′29″W
- Country: France
- Region: Normandy
- Department: Manche
- Arrondissement: Coutances
- Canton: Créances

Government
  - Mayor (2020–2026): Daniel Guillard
- Area^{1}: 14.99 km^{2} (5.79 sq mi)
- Elevation: 36 m (118 ft)
- Highest elevation: 130 m (430 ft)
- Lowest elevation: 2 m (6.6 ft)
- Population (2023): 237
  - Density: 15.8/km^{2} (40.9/sq mi)
- Time zone: UTC+01:00 (CET)
  - Summer (DST): UTC+02:00 (CEST)
- INSEE/Postal code: 50405 /50250
- ^{1} French Land Register data, which excludes lakes, ponds, glaciers > 1 km^{2} (0.386 sq mi or 247 acres) and river estuaries.

Le Plessis-Lastelle is a commune in the Manche department in Normandy in north-western France.

== See also ==
- Communes of the Manche department
