= Varenguebec =

- Commune
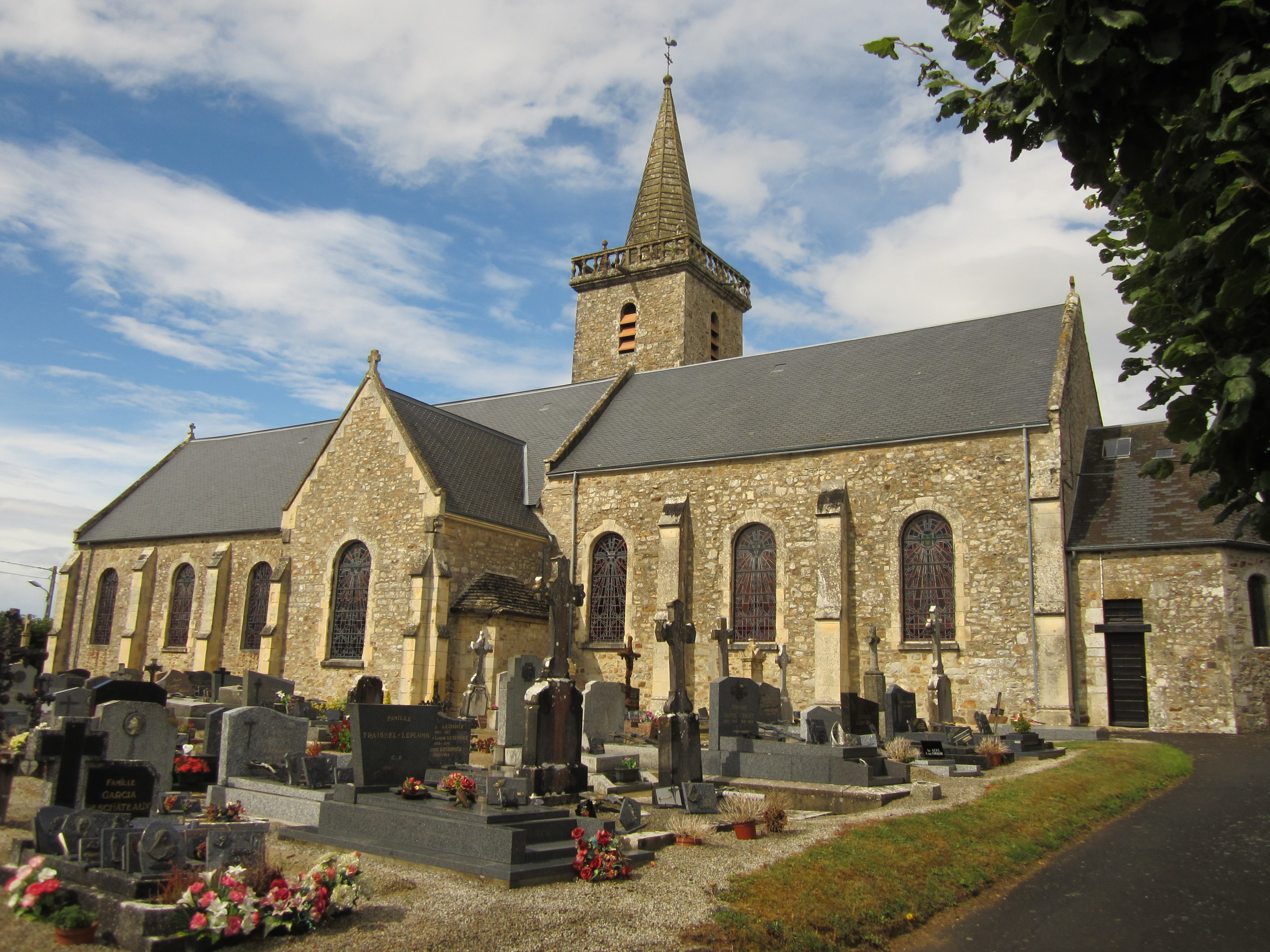
- The church of Saint-Martin
- Location of Varenguebec
- Location within France Location within Normandy
- Coordinates: 49°20′22″N 1°29′49″W
- Country: France
- Region: Normandy
- Department: Manche
- Arrondissement: Coutances
- Canton: Créances

Government
  - Mayor (2020–2026): Évelyne Melain
- Area^{1}: 21.19 km^{2} (8.18 sq mi)
- Elevation: 70 m (230 ft)
- Highest elevation: 131 m (430 ft)
- Lowest elevation: 2 m (6.6 ft)
- Population (2023): 321
  - Density: 15.1/km^{2} (39.2/sq mi)
- Time zone: UTC+01:00 (CET)
  - Summer (DST): UTC+02:00 (CEST)
- INSEE/Postal code: 50617 /50250
- ^{1} French Land Register data, which excludes lakes, ponds, glaciers > 1 km^{2} (0.386 sq mi or 247 acres) and river estuaries.

Varenguebec (French pronunciation: [vaʁɑ̃ɡbɛk]) is a commune in the Manche department in Normandy in north-western France.

== See also ==
- Communes of the Manche department
