= Millières, Manche =

Millières
- Commune
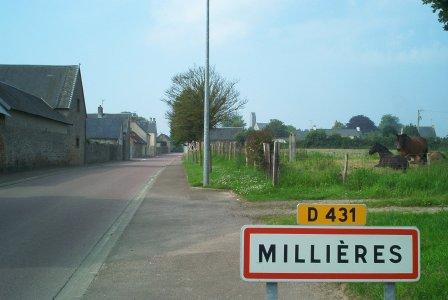
- The village of La Fresnerie
- Location of Millières
- Location within France Location within Normandy
- Coordinates: 49°11′10″N 1°27′28″W
- Country: France
- Region: Normandy
- Department: Manche
- Arrondissement: Coutances
- Canton: Créances

Government
  - Mayor (2020–2026): Raymond Diesnis
- Area^{1}: 20.27 km^{2} (7.83 sq mi)
- Elevation: 56 m (184 ft)
- Highest elevation: 53 m (174 ft)
- Lowest elevation: 7 m (23 ft)
- Population (2023): 759
  - Density: 37.4/km^{2} (97.0/sq mi)
- Time zone: UTC+01:00 (CET)
  - Summer (DST): UTC+02:00 (CEST)
- INSEE/Postal code: 50328 /50190
- ^{1} French Land Register data, which excludes lakes, ponds, glaciers > 1 km^{2} (0.386 sq mi or 247 acres) and river estuaries.

Millières is a commune in the Manche department in Normandy in north-western France

== See also ==
- Communes of the Manche department
