= Créances =

- Commune
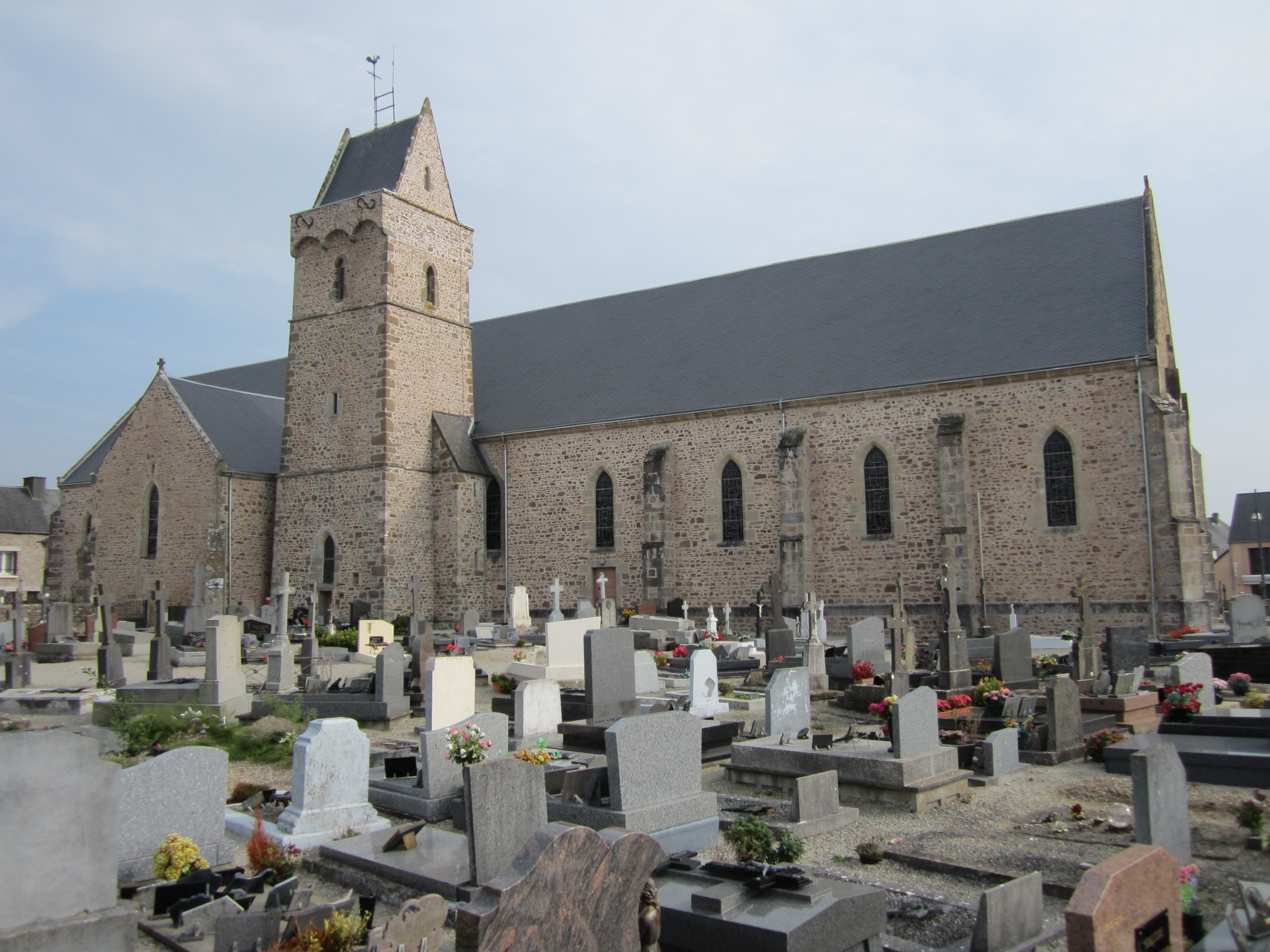
- The church of Sainte-Trinité
- Location of Créances
- Location within France Location within Normandy
- Coordinates: 49°12′06″N 1°33′55″W
- Country: France
- Region: Normandy
- Department: Manche
- Arrondissement: Coutances
- Canton: Créances

Government
  - Mayor (2020–2026): Henri Lemoigne
- Area^{1}: 20.32 km^{2} (7.85 sq mi)
- Elevation: 25 m (82 ft)
- Highest elevation: 35 m (115 ft)
- Lowest elevation: 0 m (0 ft)
- Population (2023): 2,067
  - Density: 101.7/km^{2} (263.5/sq mi)
- Time zone: UTC+01:00 (CET)
  - Summer (DST): UTC+02:00 (CEST)
- INSEE/Postal code: 50151 /50710
- Website: www.ville-creances.fr
- ^{1} French Land Register data, which excludes lakes, ponds, glaciers > 1 km^{2} (0.386 sq mi or 247 acres) and river estuaries.

Créances (French pronunciation: [kʁeɑ̃s]) is a commune in the Manche department in Normandy in north-western France.

== Population ==
Historical population
Year	Pop.	±% p.a.
1968	2,033	—
1975	1,933	−0.72%
1982	1,935	+0.01%
1990	1,926	−0.06%
1999	2,014	+0.50%
2007	2,126	+0.68%
2012	2,199	+0.68%
2017	2,137	−0.57%
2023	2,067	−0.55%
Source: INSEE

== See also ==
- Communes of the Manche department
