= Doville =

- Commune
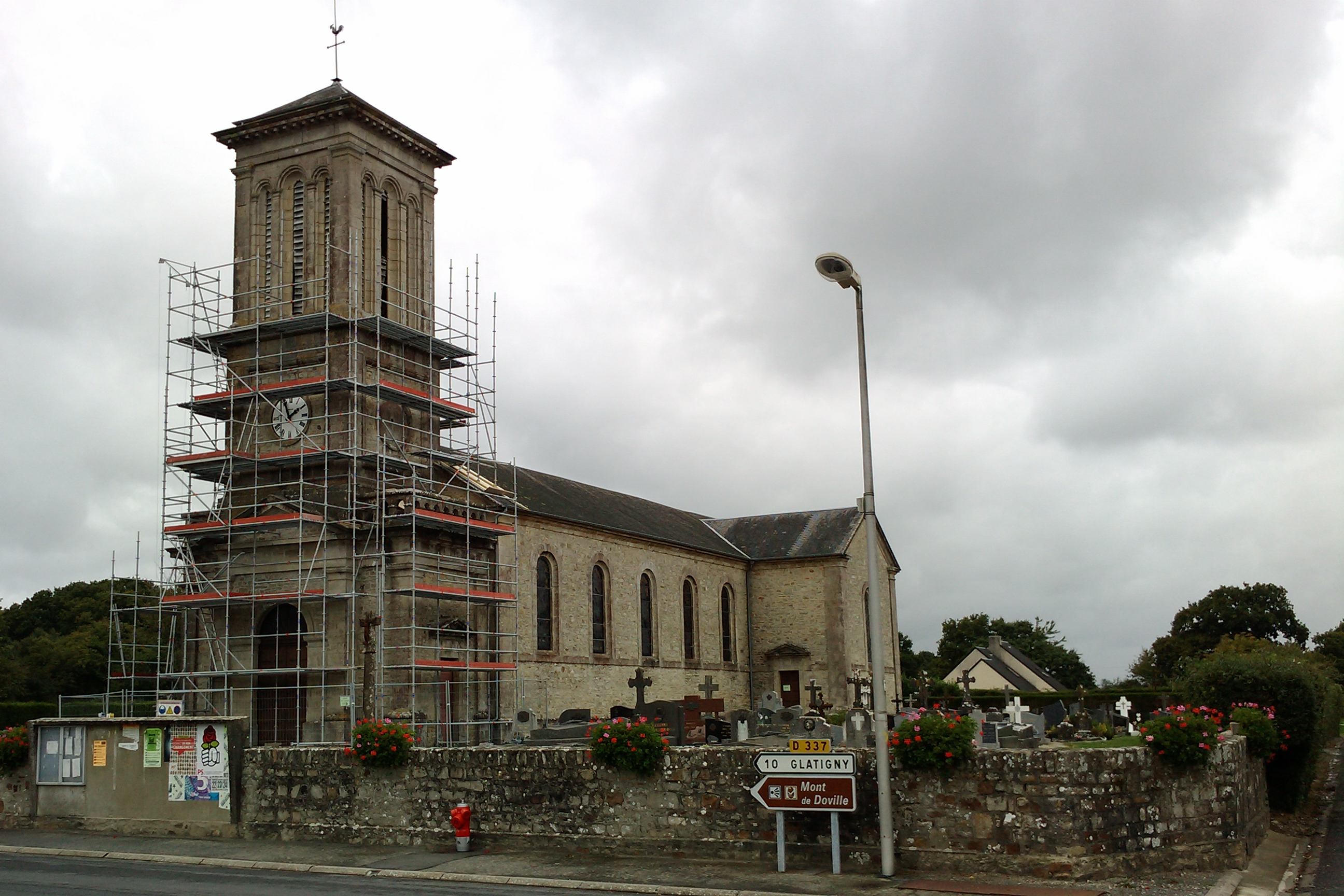
- The church of Saint-Martin undergoing restoration
- Location of Doville
- Location within France Location within Normandy
- Coordinates: 49°19′57″N 1°32′21″W
- Country: France
- Region: Normandy
- Department: Manche
- Arrondissement: Coutances
- Canton: Créances

Government
  - Mayor (2020–2026): Christophe Fossey
- Area^{1}: 11.09 km^{2} (4.28 sq mi)
- Elevation: 23 m (75 ft)
- Highest elevation: 128 m (420 ft)
- Lowest elevation: 2 m (6.6 ft)
- Population (2023): 321
  - Density: 28.9/km^{2} (75.0/sq mi)
- Time zone: UTC+01:00 (CET)
  - Summer (DST): UTC+02:00 (CEST)
- INSEE/Postal code: 50166 /50250
- ^{1} French Land Register data, which excludes lakes, ponds, glaciers > 1 km^{2} (0.386 sq mi or 247 acres) and river estuaries.

Doville (French pronunciation: [dɔvil]) is a commune in the Manche department in north-western France.

== See also ==
- Communes of the Manche department
