= Canton of Créances =

Coordinates: 49.20°N 1.56°W

The canton of Créances is an administrative division of the Manche department, northwestern France. It was created at the French canton reorganisation which came into effect in March 2015. Its seat is in Créances.

It consists of the following communes:

1. Bretteville-sur-Ay
2. Canville-la-Rocque
3. Créances
4. Doville
5. La Feuillie
6. La Haye
7. Laulne
8. Lessay
9. Millières
10. Montsenelle
11. Neufmesnil
12. Pirou
13. Le Plessis-Lastelle
14. Saint-Germain-sur-Ay
15. Saint-Nicolas-de-Pierrepont
16. Saint-Patrice-de-Claids
17. Saint-Sauveur-de-Pierrepont
18. Varenguebec
19. Vesly
