= Saint-Patrice-de-Claids =

- Commune
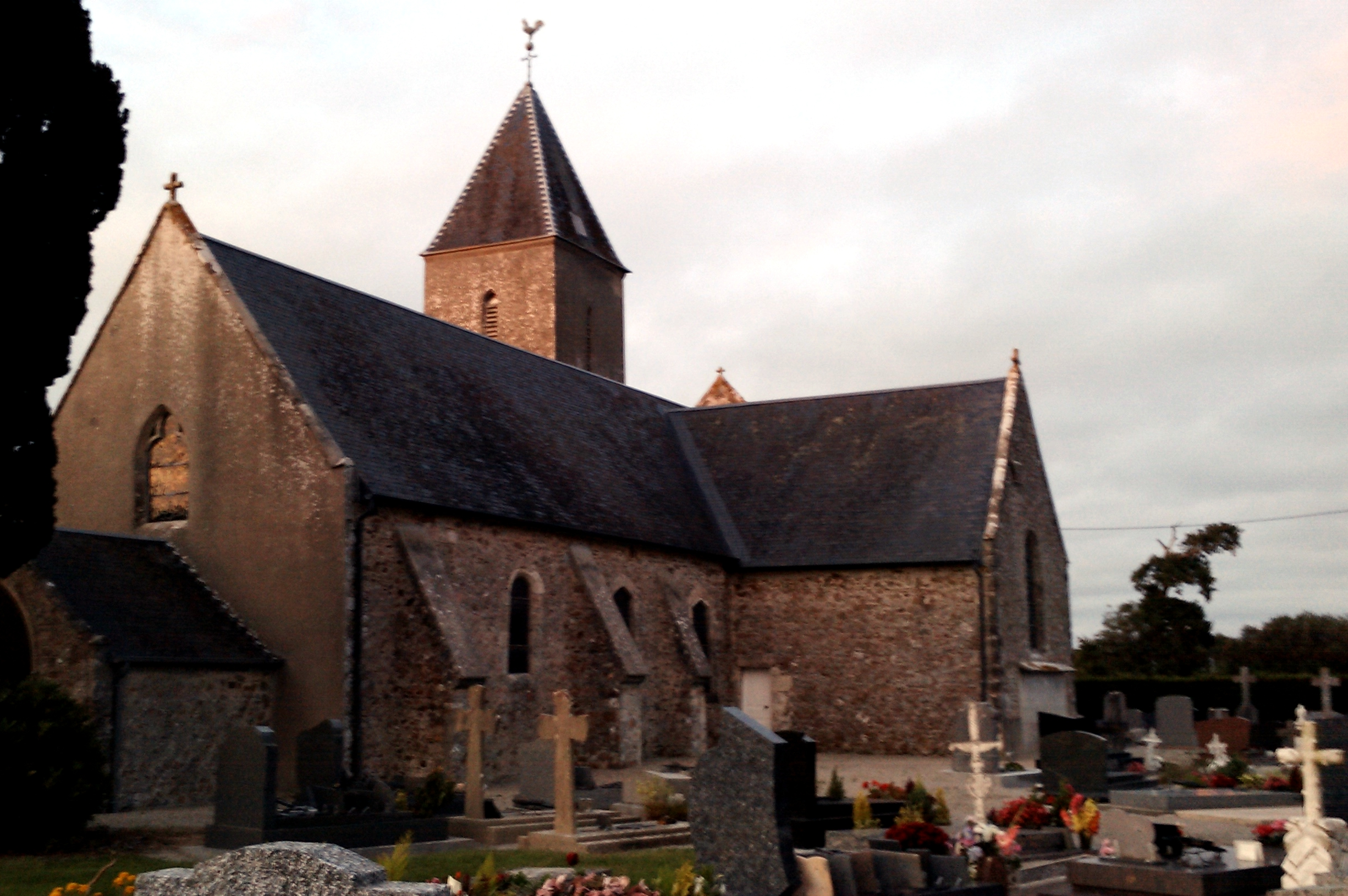
- The church in Saint-Patrice-de-Claids
- Location of Saint-Patrice-de-Claids
- Location within France Location within Normandy
- Coordinates: 49°13′51″N 1°26′09″W
- Country: France
- Region: Normandy
- Department: Manche
- Arrondissement: Coutances
- Canton: Créances

Government
  - Mayor (2020–2026): Jean-Luc Launey
- Area^{1}: 5.58 km^{2} (2.15 sq mi)
- Elevation: 32 m (105 ft)
- Highest elevation: 34 m (112 ft)
- Lowest elevation: 9 m (30 ft)
- Population (2023): 180
  - Density: 32/km^{2} (84/sq mi)
- Time zone: UTC+01:00 (CET)
  - Summer (DST): UTC+02:00 (CEST)
- INSEE/Postal code: 50533 /50190
- ^{1} French Land Register data, which excludes lakes, ponds, glaciers > 1 km^{2} (0.386 sq mi or 247 acres) and river estuaries.

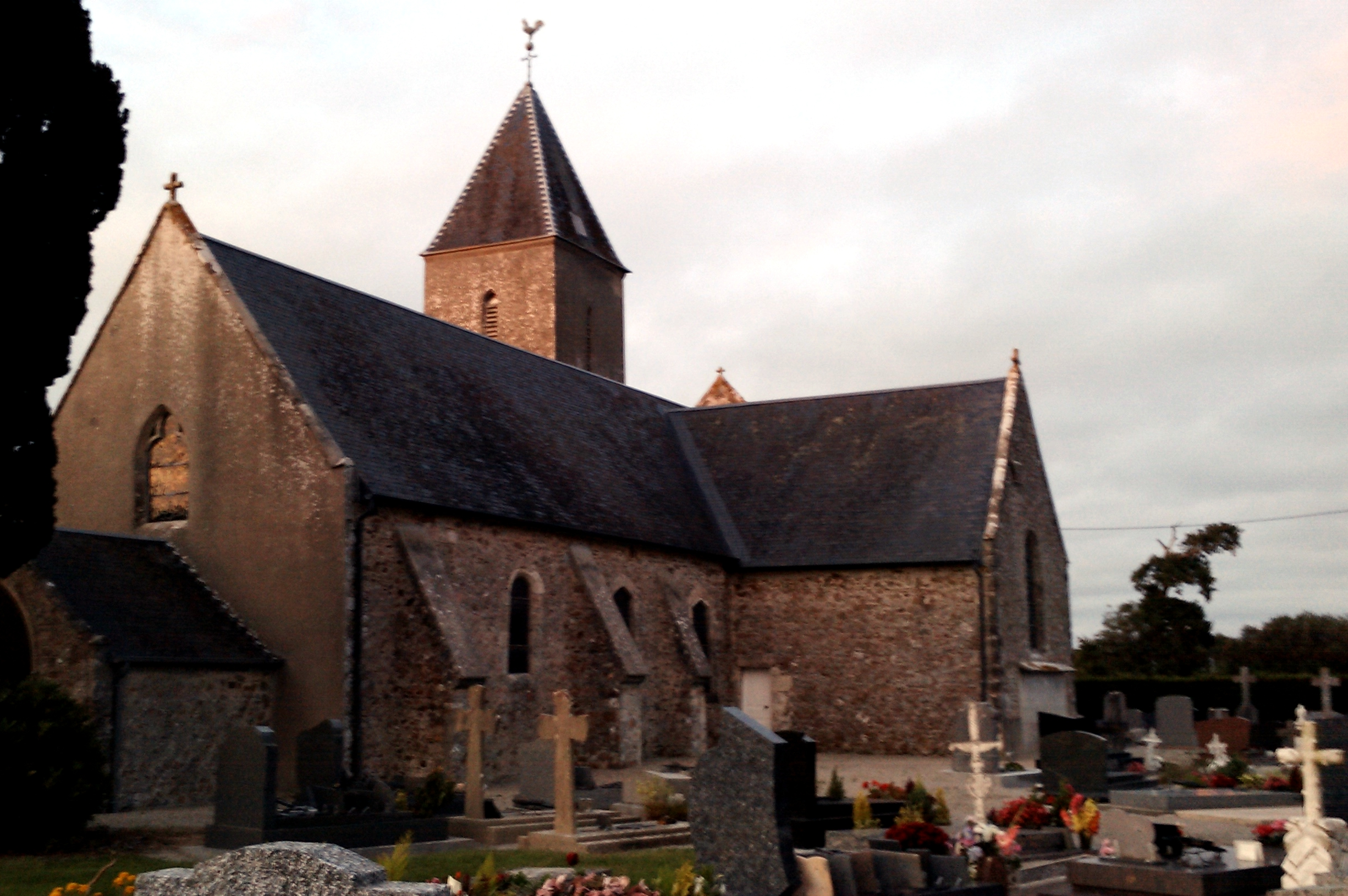
Church

Saint-Patrice-de-Claids (French pronunciation: [sɛ̃ patʁis də klɛ]) is a commune in the Manche department in Normandy in north-western France.

== See also ==
- Communes of the Manche department
