= Bretteville-sur-Ay =

- Commune
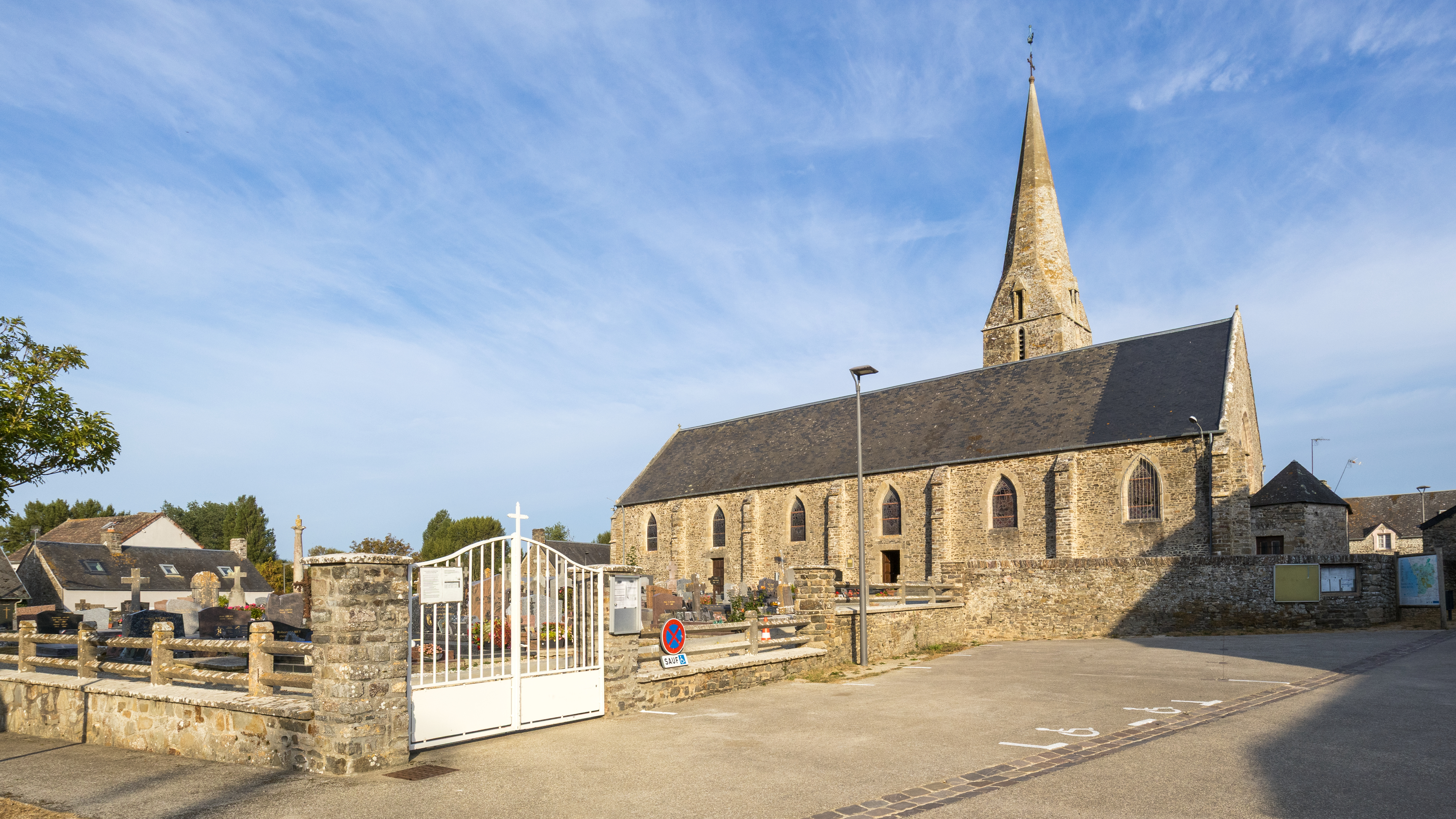
- The church of Saint-Martin
- Location of Bretteville-sur-Ay
- Location within France Location within Normandy
- Coordinates: 49°15′40″N 1°37′52″W
- Country: France
- Region: Normandy
- Department: Manche
- Arrondissement: Coutances
- Canton: Créances

Government
  - Mayor (2020–2026): Guy Closet
- Area^{1}: 9.75 km^{2} (3.76 sq mi)
- Elevation: 20 m (66 ft)
- Highest elevation: 38 m (125 ft)
- Lowest elevation: 4 m (13 ft)
- Population (2023): 444
  - Density: 45.5/km^{2} (118/sq mi)
- Time zone: UTC+01:00 (CET)
  - Summer (DST): UTC+02:00 (CEST)
- INSEE/Postal code: 50078 /50430
- ^{1} French Land Register data, which excludes lakes, ponds, glaciers > 1 km^{2} (0.386 sq mi or 247 acres) and river estuaries.

Bretteville-sur-Ay (French pronunciation: [bʁɛtvil syʁ ɛ]) is a commune in the Manche department in Normandy in northwestern France.

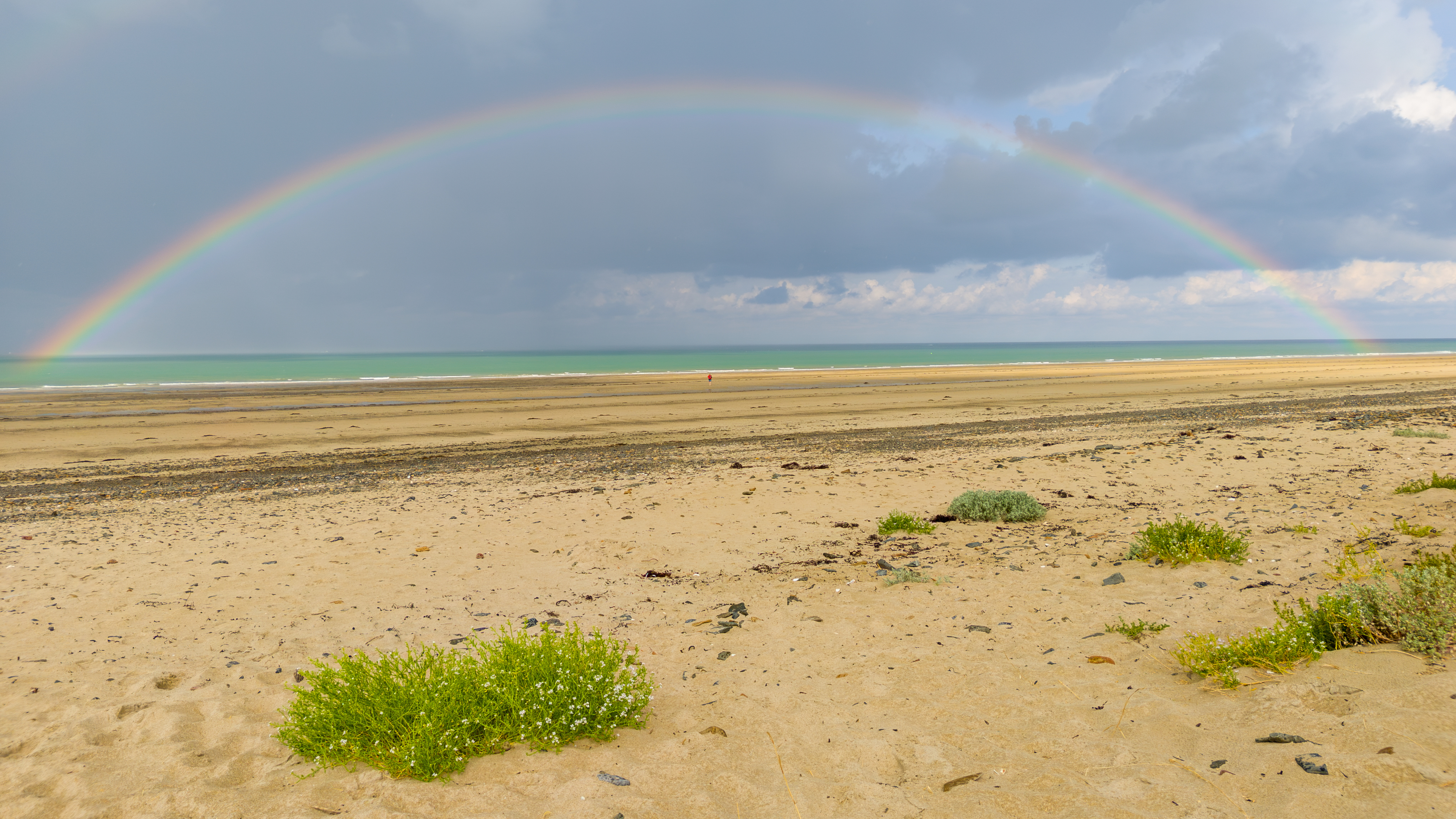
The beach opposite Jersey

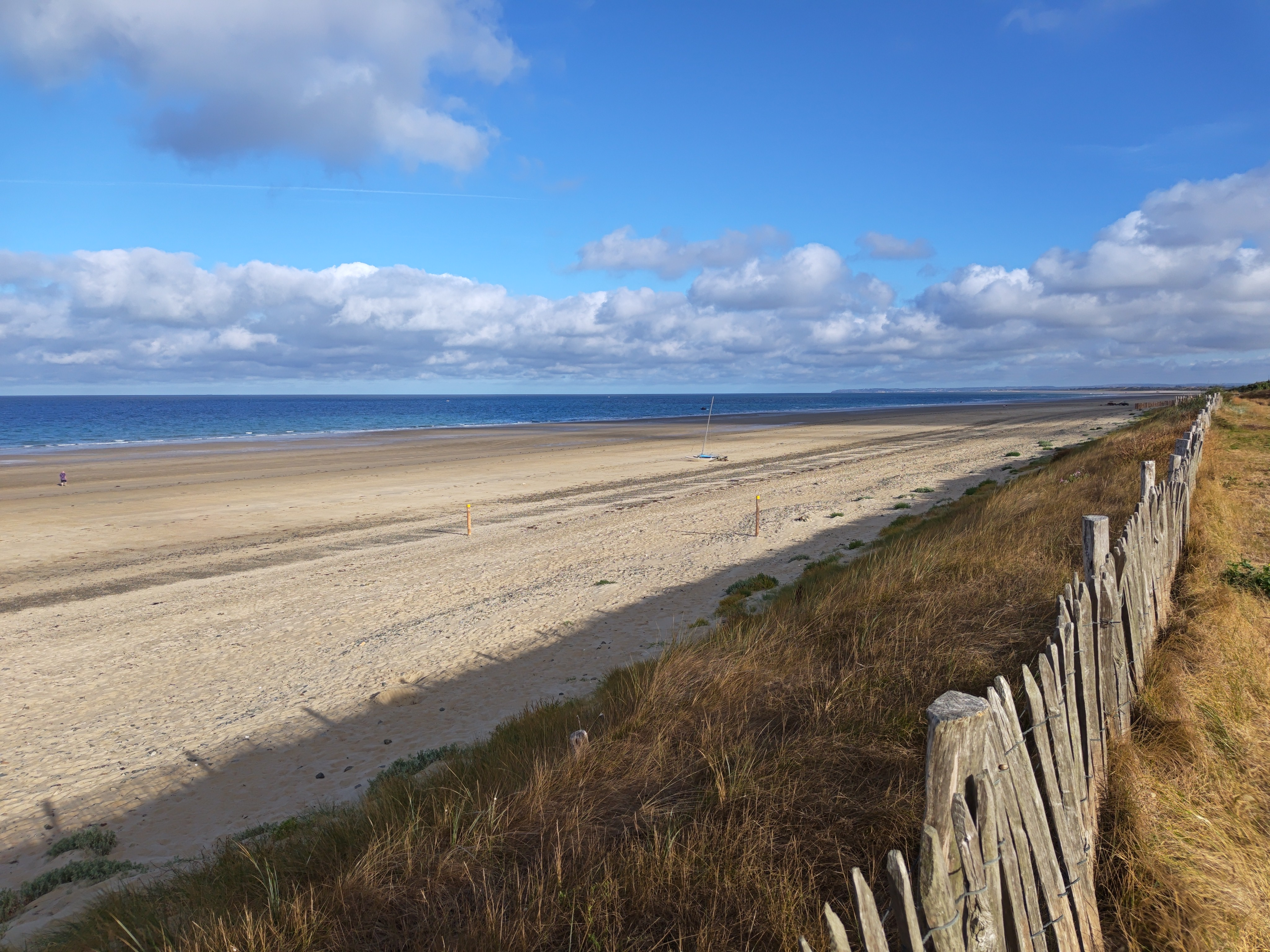

== Population ==
Historical population
Year	Pop.	±% p.a.
1968	367	—
1975	378	+0.42%
1982	321	−2.31%
1990	302	−0.76%
1999	317	+0.54%
2007	337	+0.77%
2012	394	+3.17%
2017	382	−0.62%
2023	444	+2.54%
Source: INSEE

== International relations ==
Bretteville is twinned with the village of Sway, England.

== See also ==
- Communes of the Manche department
