= Neufmesnil =

- Commune
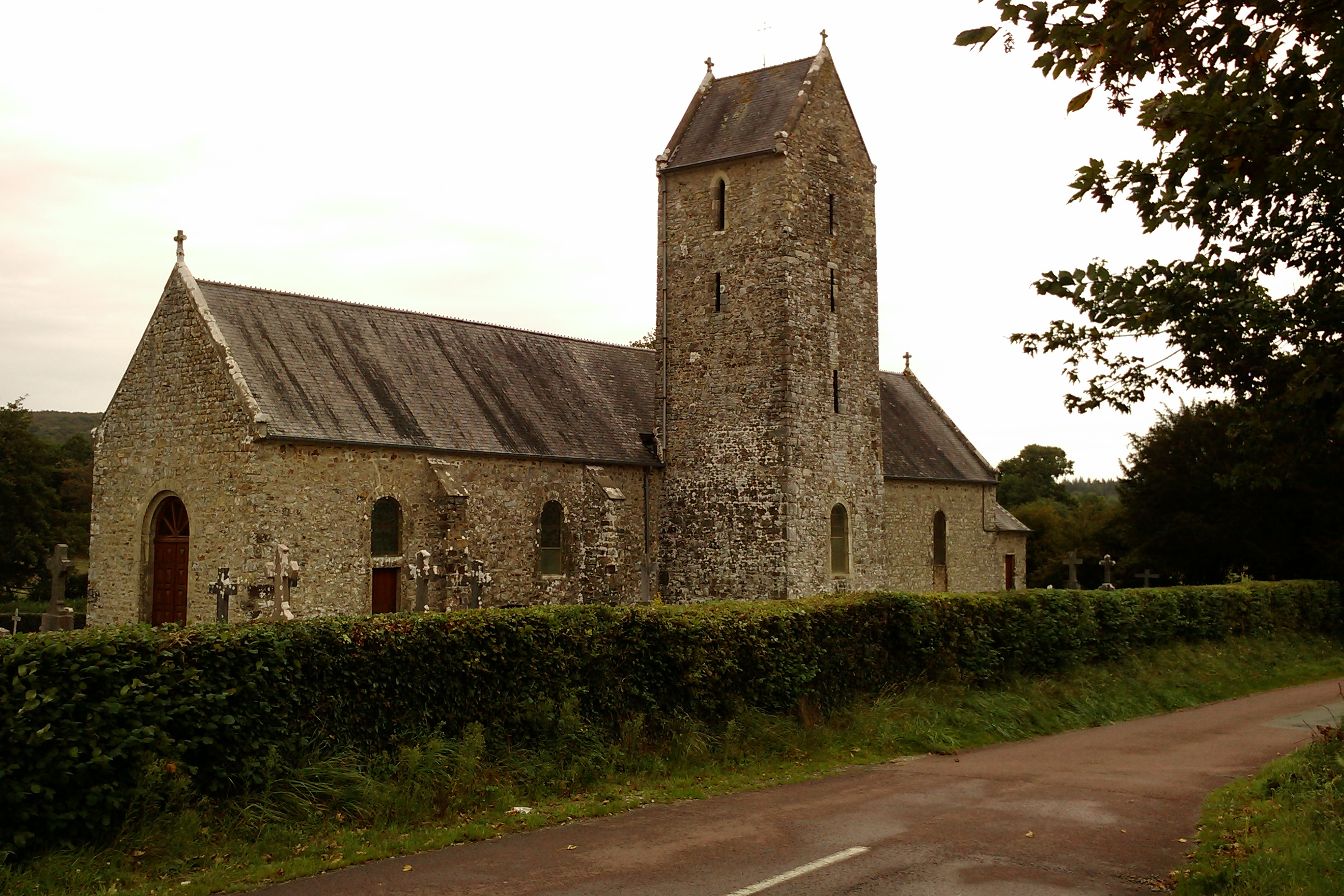
- The church of Neufmesnil
- Location of Neufmesnil
- Location within France Location within Normandy
- Coordinates: 49°18′45″N 1°32′18″W
- Country: France
- Region: Normandy
- Department: Manche
- Arrondissement: Coutances
- Canton: Créances

Government
  - Mayor (2020–2026): Simone Euras
- Area^{1}: 5.33 km^{2} (2.06 sq mi)
- Elevation: 27 m (89 ft)
- Highest elevation: 90 m (300 ft)
- Lowest elevation: 17 m (56 ft)
- Population (2023): 176
  - Density: 33.0/km^{2} (85.5/sq mi)
- Time zone: UTC+01:00 (CET)
  - Summer (DST): UTC+02:00 (CEST)
- INSEE/Postal code: 50372 /50250
- ^{1} French Land Register data, which excludes lakes, ponds, glaciers > 1 km^{2} (0.386 sq mi or 247 acres) and river estuaries.

Neufmesnil (French pronunciation: [nømɛnil]) is a commune in the Manche department in Normandy in north-western France.

== See also ==
- Communes of the Manche department
