= La Feuillie, Manche =

La Feuillie
- Commune
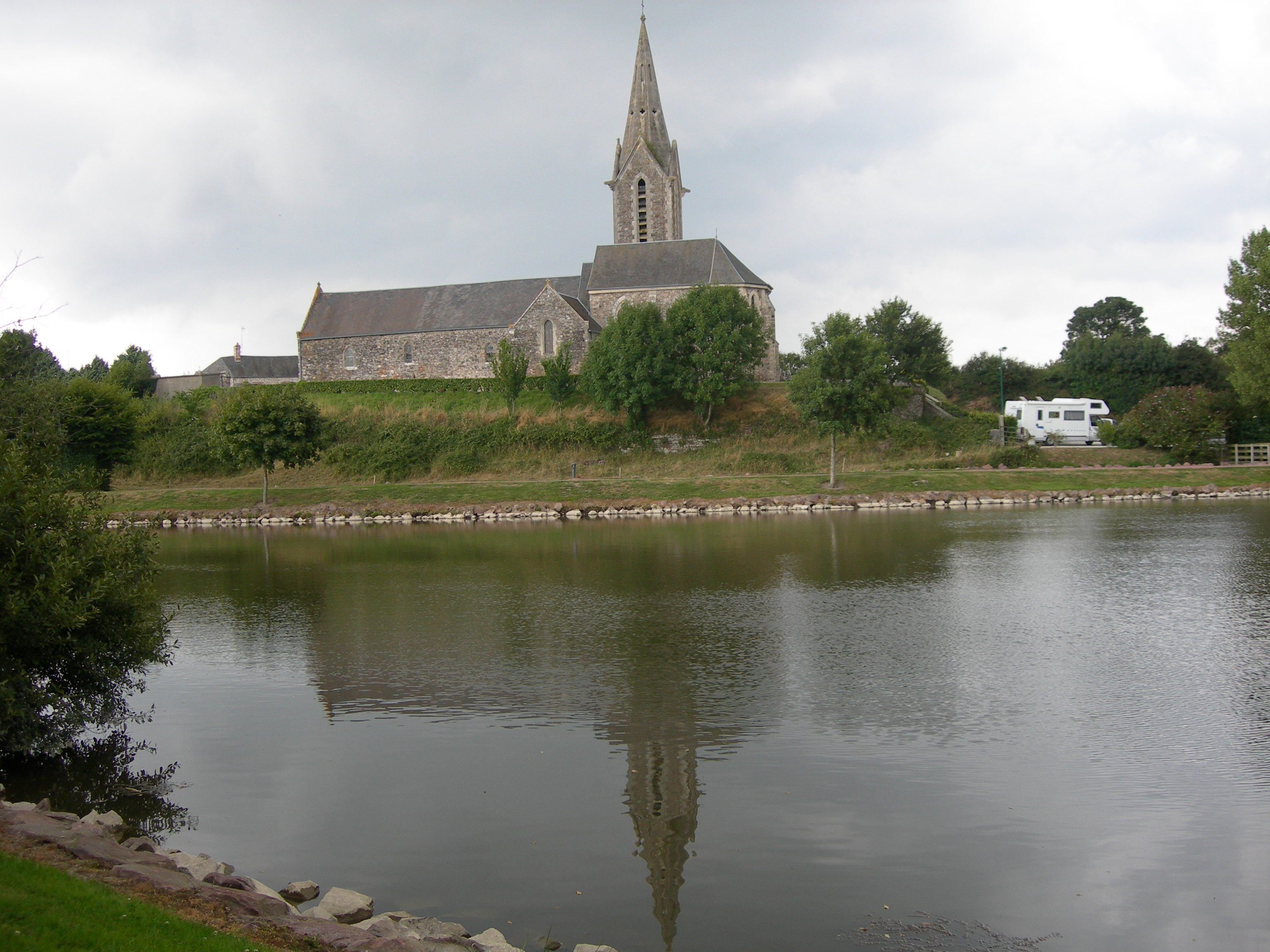
- The church in La Feuillie
- Location of La Feuillie
- Location within France Location within Normandy
- Coordinates: 49°10′42″N 1°28′45″W
- Country: France
- Region: Normandy
- Department: Manche
- Arrondissement: Coutances
- Canton: Créances

Government
  - Mayor (2020–2026): Philippe Clérot
- Area^{1}: 12.46 km^{2} (4.81 sq mi)
- Elevation: 14 m (46 ft)
- Highest elevation: 37 m (121 ft)
- Lowest elevation: 11 m (36 ft)
- Population (2023): 302
  - Density: 24.2/km^{2} (62.8/sq mi)
- Time zone: UTC+01:00 (CET)
  - Summer (DST): UTC+02:00 (CEST)
- INSEE/Postal code: 50182 /50190
- ^{1} French Land Register data, which excludes lakes, ponds, glaciers > 1 km^{2} (0.386 sq mi or 247 acres) and river estuaries.

La Feuillie (French pronunciation: [la fœji]) is a commune in the Manche department in north-western France.

== See also ==
- Communes of the Manche department
