= Saint-Germain-sur-Ay =

- Commune
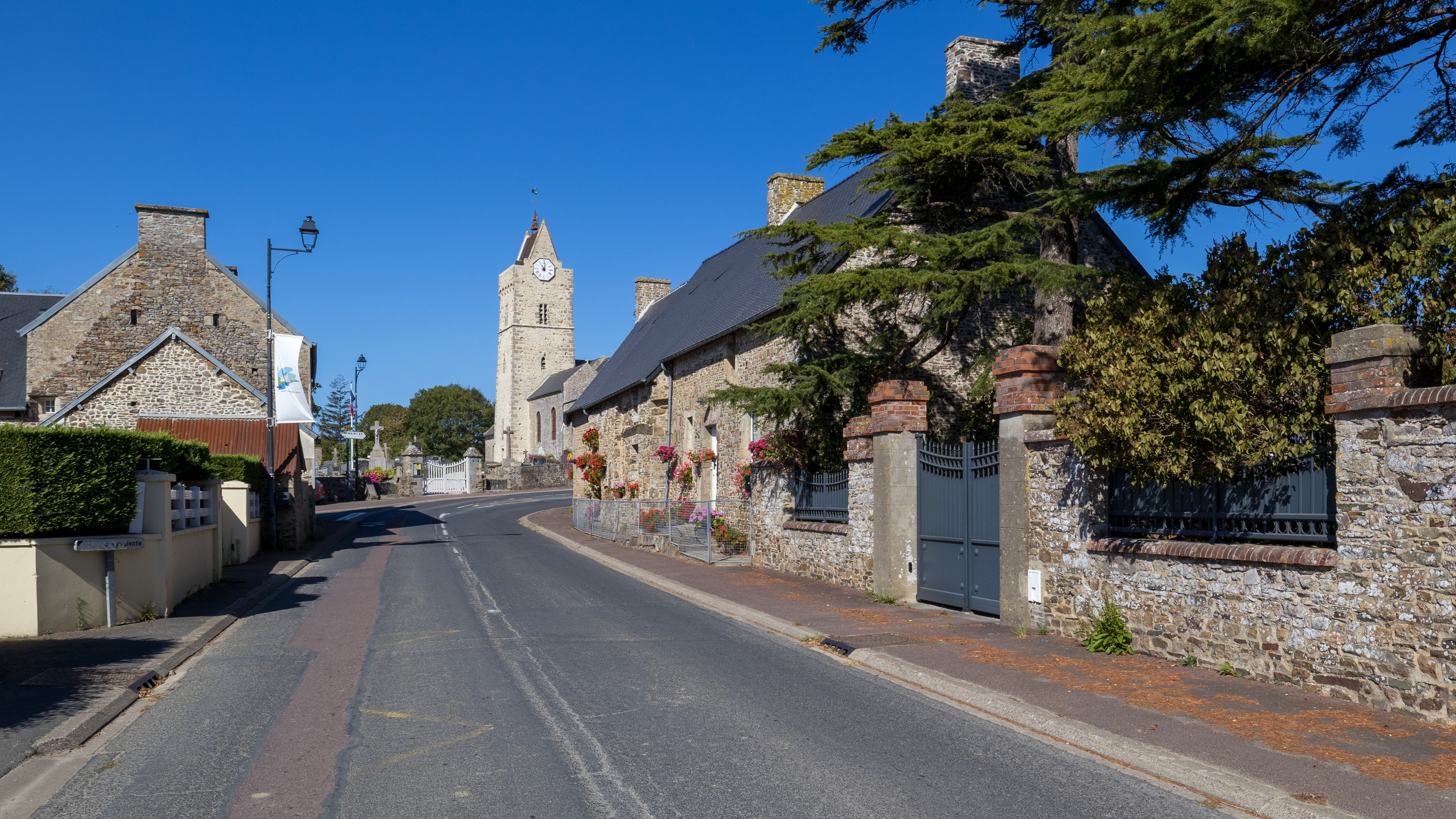
- The church
- Location of Saint-Germain-sur-Ay
- Location within France Location within Normandy
- Coordinates: 49°14′09″N 1°35′32″W
- Country: France
- Region: Normandy
- Department: Manche
- Arrondissement: Coutances
- Canton: Créances

Government
  - Mayor (2020–2026): Christophe Gilles
- Area^{1}: 14.52 km^{2} (5.61 sq mi)
- Elevation: 5 m (16 ft)
- Highest elevation: 39 m (128 ft)
- Lowest elevation: 0 m (0 ft)
- Population (2023): 926
  - Density: 63.8/km^{2} (165/sq mi)
- Time zone: UTC+01:00 (CET)
  - Summer (DST): UTC+02:00 (CEST)
- INSEE/Postal code: 50481 /50430
- ^{1} French Land Register data, which excludes lakes, ponds, glaciers > 1 km^{2} (0.386 sq mi or 247 acres) and river estuaries.

Saint-Germain-sur-Ay (French pronunciation: [sɛ̃ ʒɛʁmɛ̃ syʁ ɛ]) is a commune in the Manche department in Normandy in north-western France. It is located at the mouth of the river Ay.

The listed church.

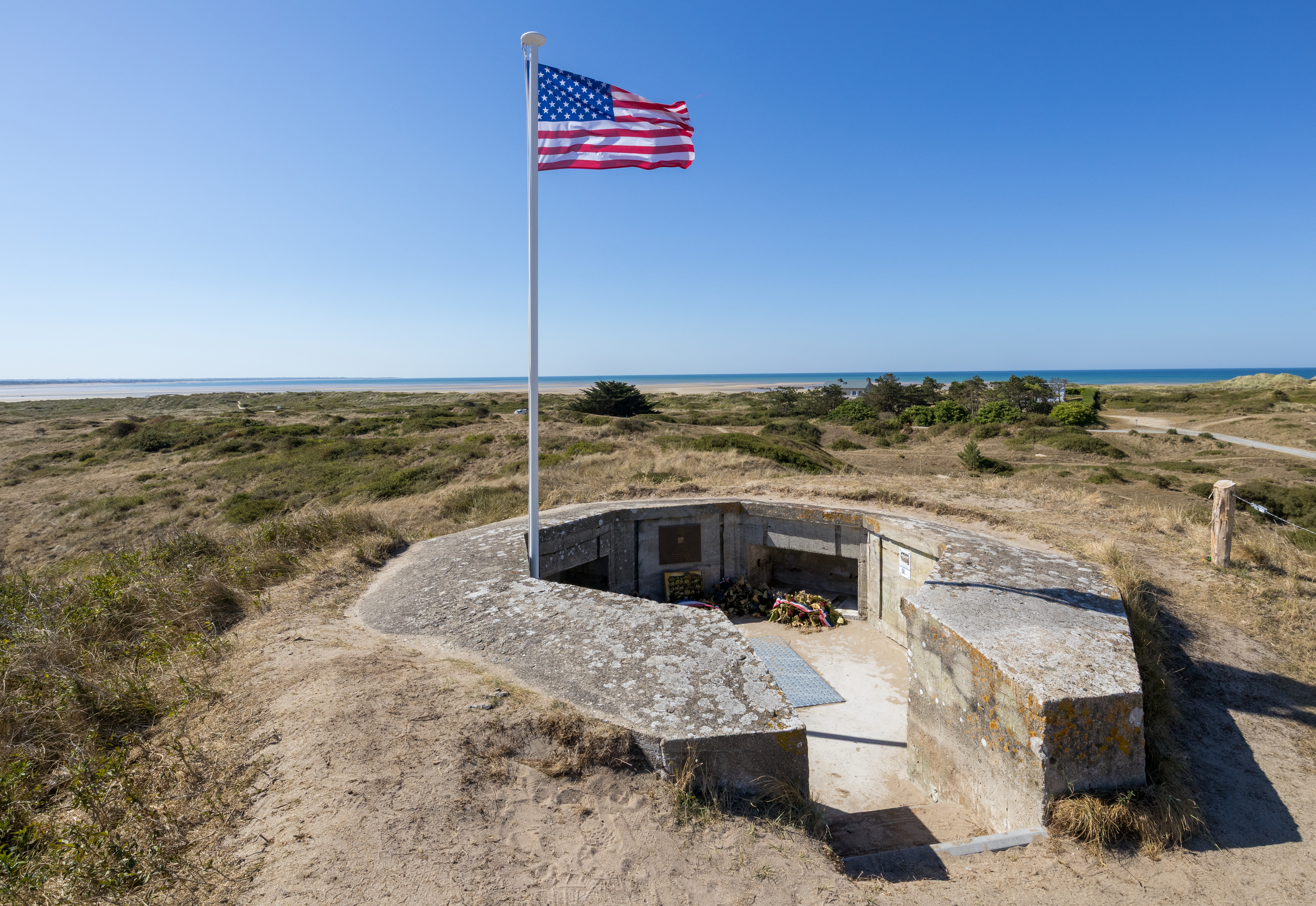
Monument to the 121st US Cavalry Reconnaissance Squadron.

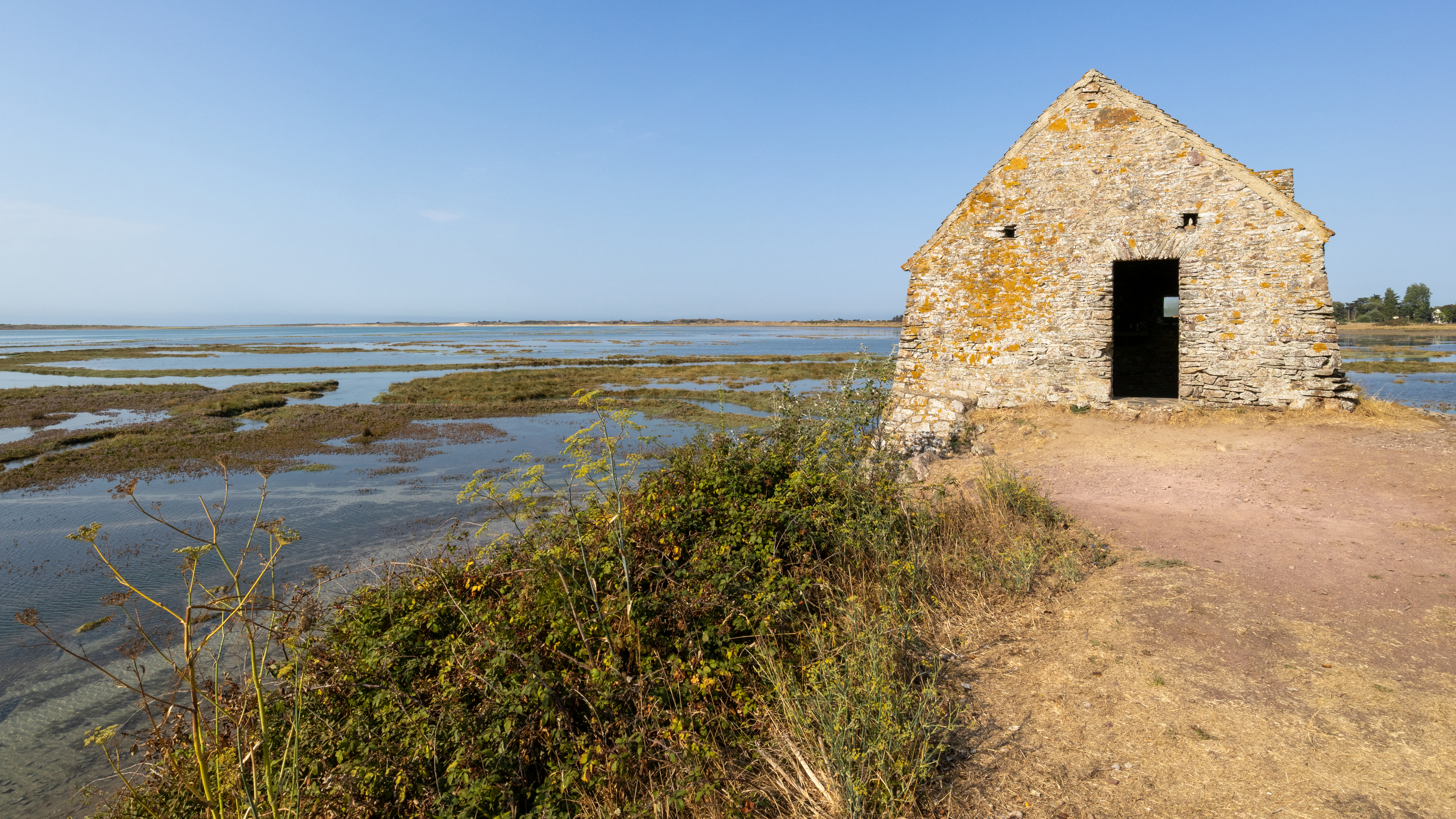
Guardhouse

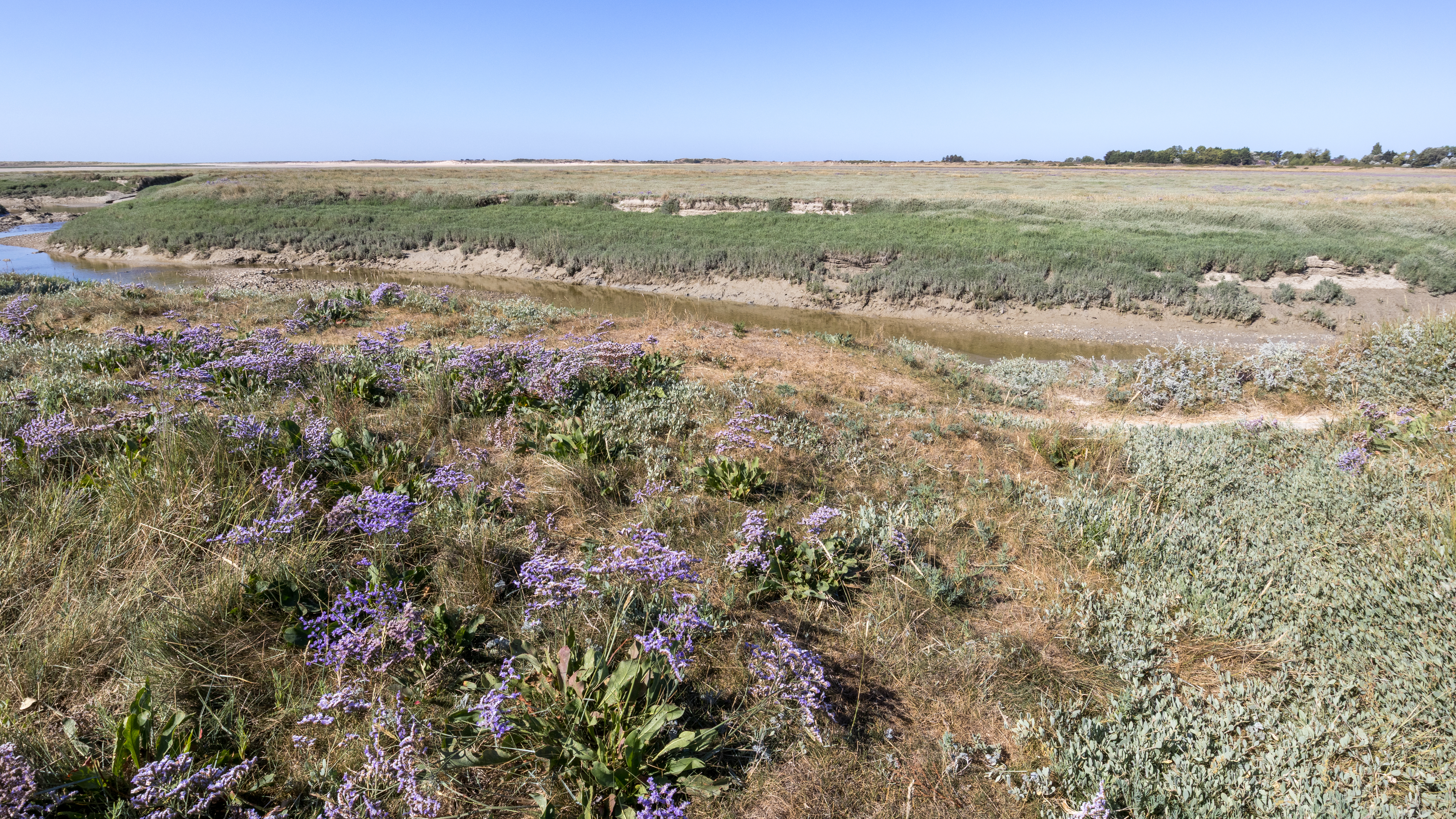
Saint-Germain-sur-Ay Harbor

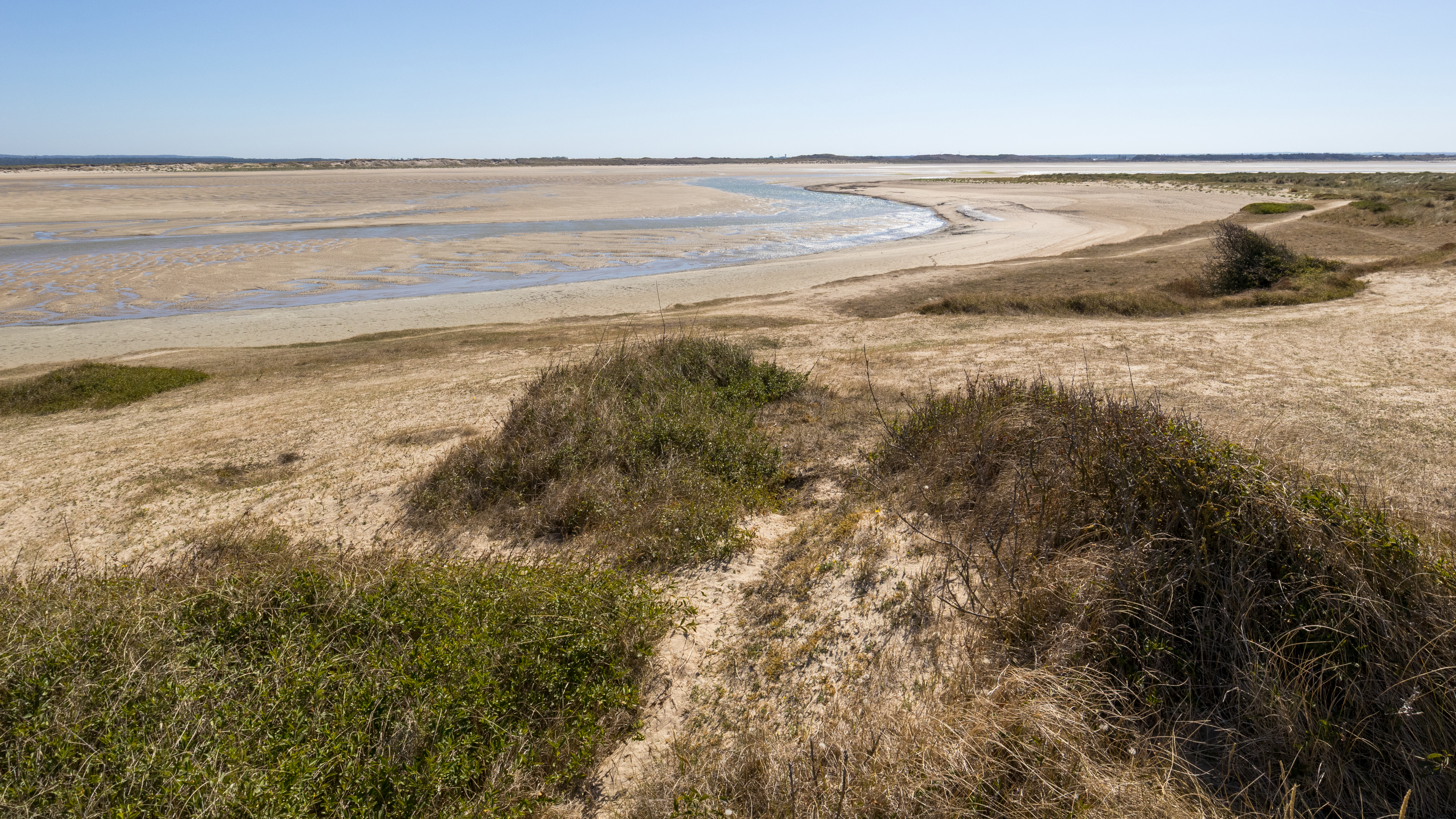
Pointe du Banc

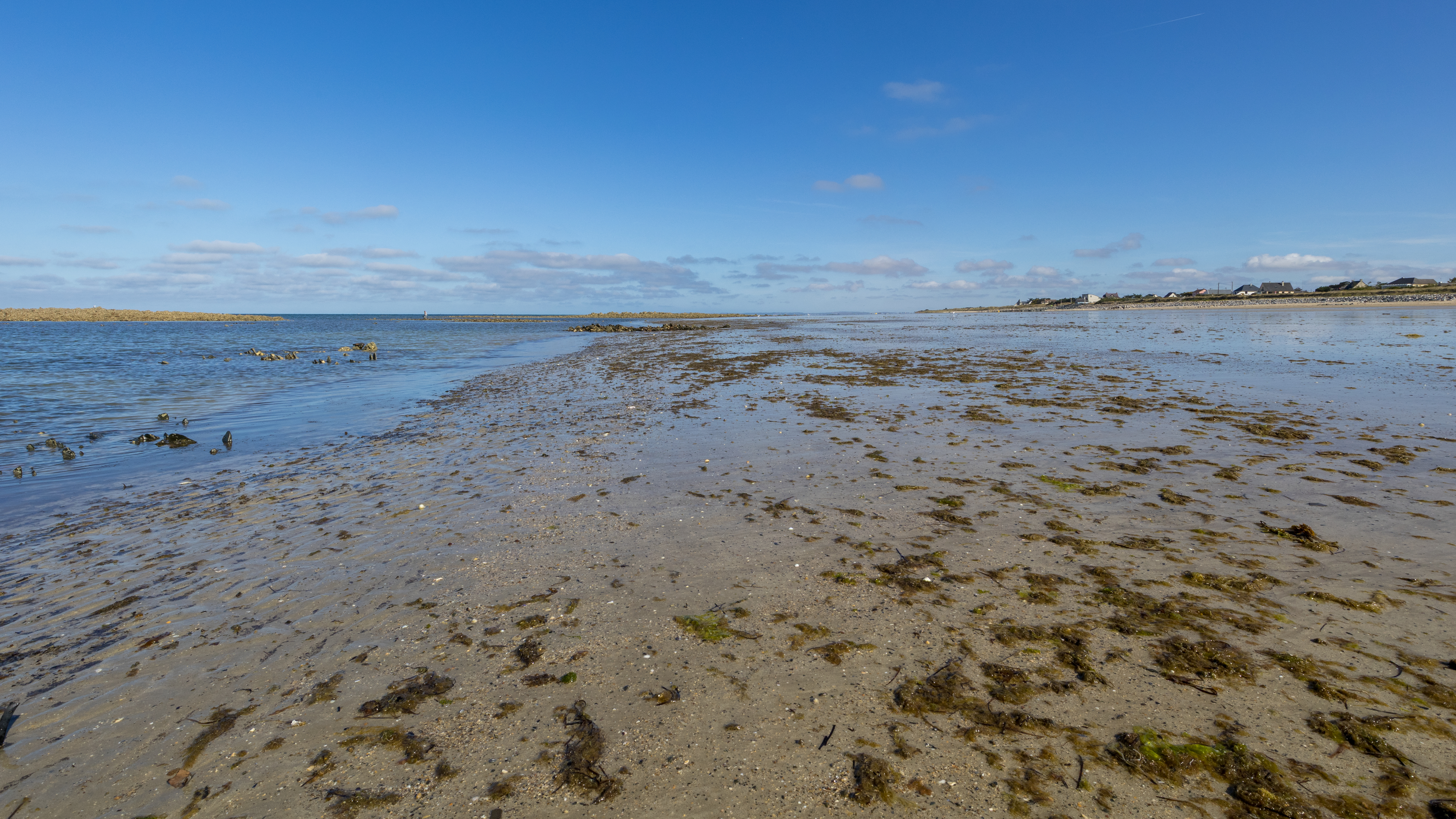
Beach at low tide, facing Jersey

== See also ==
- Communes of the Manche department
