= CSS Alabama's Eastern Atlantic expeditionary raid =

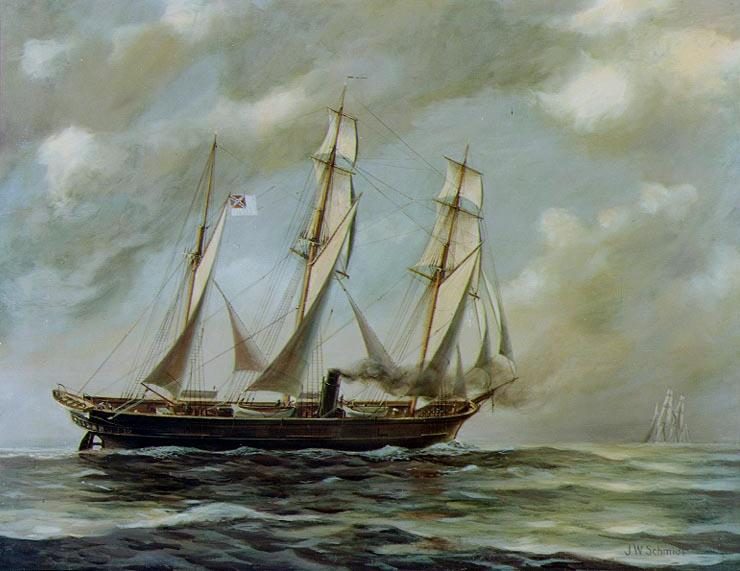
Alabama

The CSS Alabama's Eastern Atlantic expeditionary raid commenced shortly after the ship left Liverpool and was commissioned as the CSS Alabama, a Confederate commerce raider, lasting from August 24, 1862, to about September 30, 1862. The primary area of operation during this expeditionary raid, was the Azores west of the African and European continents.

== Raid overview ==
On its voyage, CSS Alabama, newly commissioned on August 24, 1862, set sail for the eastern Atlantic Ocean in the area of the Azores, reaching the Western Azores along Pico Island and Faial Island by September 4. The following day, Alabama sighted the Ocmulgee, and came in close under the pretense of the United States colors. The Ocmulgee, with whales still beside her, was taken with no resistance, and Captain Raphael Semmes waited until the following morning to burn her, not wanting to alert other whalers in the area.

On September 7, slowly making its way around Flores Island, Sunday muster was held, and Capt. Semmes read to the crew the Articles of War. The Ocmulgee's prisoners were let off at Lajes on Flores Island, and soon sighted another sail on the horizon. This time, it was the British colors hoisted as the Alabama gave chase, and shoots a 32-pounder just over the heads of the crew of the Starlight out of Boston, a fast schooner. The Starlight heaves to, and the crew is captured. The following morning, Starlight's crew are paroled at Santa Cruz on Flores Island. Spotting another sail, CSS Alabama quickly overtakes a Portuguese whaling brig, letting her go. But luck returns, and on the afternoon of September 8 the ruse of the U.S. colors is used once again, successfully, to overtake the large whaler Ocean Rover, out of New Bedford, Massachusetts. The Ocean Rover is surprised to find that CSS Alabama is merely a "rebel" ship, and not a protecting U.S. privateer, such as Gideon Welles, Secretary of the Navy, had promised the industry. The captain and crew are let off in their lifeboats to row the short distance to Flores, for which the Ocean Rover's captain later claimed that Captain Semmes was nothing short of a barbarous rouge. That night yet another whaler is sighted, and as dawn breaks, Semmes uses the British colors again, giving equal time for both sets of false colors. The Alert (the ship made famous by the American author Richard Henry Dana Jr. in his memoir Two Years Before the Mast), out of New London, shows no colors, and Semmes orders her to heave to, after demonstrating yet again the Alabama's 32-pounder. The crew are paroled at Flores, and then Semmes proceeds to light the Atlantic sky with a three-ship torching.

Later the same day, September 9, while the blaze is still going, the crew spot yet another whaler. This time both hoist the U.S. colors. However, spotting the burning show afar behind CSS Alabama, the Captain of the Weathergauge out of Provincetown, Massachusetts figures that all is not right, and suddenly comes about, only to witness CSS Alabama change colors and fire a blank cartridge. The crew of CSS Alabama realize that wasting actual ammunition is not always necessary, given the ease of the Yankee surrenders. This time the prisoners are put off at Corvo Island, and CSS Alabama is off yet again, another sail having been spotted. After a thrilling all night chase, the new sail is found merely to be a Danish ship, and having no bones to pick with any of the world but Yankee vessels, Semmes lays off. The CSS Alabama returns to Corvo Island for the usual prisoner debarking, and the Weathergauge is put to the torch on September 10.

A three-day break is now had by Semmes, ample time to ensure that enough torching materials have been provisioned. Breaking the short lull, September 13 brings another sail sighted, and it's up with the U.S. colors again as the Altamaha out of New Bedford, another whaler, heaves to without chase. The now traditional blaze is made, and CSS Alabama overtakes yet another foreign ship in the evening, a Spaniard vessel.

The following night, September 14, shows the wise move in having targeted the Azores as chase is given yet again. This time two blank shots are required for the usual scare, and the final prize of this expedition is pulled over, the Benjamin Tucker, also out of New Bedford. In keeping with his tradition of not alerting the entire whaling industry, the match is put to the Tucker by mid-morning on the 15th.

His crew needing rest from such enlightening activities, Captain Semmes sets course to the west, on a two-week cruise toward the New England coast, with hopes to increase the burning pace, thus ending CSS Alabama's expeditionary raid of the eastern Atlantic and Azores area. During this raid, the capture of any ships was both unnecessary and unfeasible. Most of the targets were whalers.

With a total of ten prizes burned in the eastern Atlantic, CSS Alabama had destroyed $230,000 worth of property, nearing the original cost to purchase the Alabama.

From this raiding area in the eastern Atlantic Ocean, CSS Alabama departed and sailed west toward the northeastern seaboard of Newfoundland and New England along the North American coastline. Along the way, she experienced a long succession of gales and bad weather for almost two weeks while en route to the coast off North America.

== Raid bounty ==
CSS Alabama's Eastern Atlantic Expeditionary Raid
| Date | Ship Name | Tonnage | Ship Type | Location | Disposition of Ship |
|---|---|---|---|---|---|
| September 5, 1862 | Ocmulgee | 454 | Whaler | Near Santa Cruz, Flores Island | Burned |
| September 9, 1862 | Starlight | ? | Schooner | Near Santa Cruz, Flores Island | Burned |
| September 9, 1862 | Ocean Rover | 313 | Whaler | Near Santa Cruz, Flores Island | Burned |
| September 9, 1862 | Alert | 398 | Whaling Bark | Near Azores | Burned |
| September 10, 1862 | Weathergauge | ? | Whaler | Near Corvo Island | Burned |
| September 13, 1862 | Altahama | 119 | Whaling Brig | Near Corvo Island | Burned |
| September 15, 1862 | Benjamin Tucker | 349 | Whaler | ? | Burned |
| September 16, 1862 | Courser | 121 | Whaling schooner | Near Flores Island | Burned |
| September 17, 1862 | Virginia | 346 | Whaler | Near Flores Island | Burned |
| September 18, 1862 | Elisha Dunbar | 257 | Whaling Bark | Near Flores Island | Burned |
