= List of castles in Normandy =

This list of castles in Normandy is a list of medieval castles or château forts in the regions of Lower Normandy and Upper Normandy in northern France.

Links in italics are links to articles in the French Wikipedia.

== Calvados ==
Castles of which little or nothing remains include Château d'Olivet.

Name	Date	Condition	Image	Ownership / Access	Notes
Château de Beaumont-le-Richard	12th century	Ruins		Farm	
Château de Caen	11-15th century	Restored			Built c.1060 by William the Conqueror, keep pulled down 1793, damaged by bombs during World War II.
Château de Colombières	14-15th century	Restored		Private (open to the public)	
Château de Courcy	12-13th century	Ruins			Demolished early 16th century by order of Cardinal Richelieu.
Château de Creully	14-16th century	Rebuilt		Commune	
Château de Falaise	12-13th century	Restored			Construction begun on site of earlier castle in 1123 by Henry I of England, damaged during World War II.
Château de la Pommeraye	16th century	Restored		Private (open to the public)	Currently a hotel, reception, and wedding venue.
Château de Vire	12th century	Ruins			

== Eure ==
Name	Date	Condition	Image	Ownership / Access	Notes
Tour des Archives de Vernon	1123	Ruins			Keep survives.
Château Gaillard	1196-8	Ruins			Built in 2 years by Richard the Lionheart, early concentric castle of advanced design.
Château-sur-Epte	11th century	Ruins			
Château de Conches-en-Ouche	11th century	Ruins			Begun 1034.
Château de Gisors	12-13th century	Ruins			
Château d'Harcourt	12-14th century	Partly habitable			Converted to residence 17th century.
Château d'Ivry-la-Bataille	10-13th century	Ruins			Dates from c.960.
Château des Tourelles	c.1196	Substantially intact			Hardly changed for 800 years.
Château du Grand-Serquigny	17th century	Ruins			Destroyed by fire on 31 December 2023.

== Manche ==
Castles of which little or nothing remains include Château Ganne.

Name	Date	Condition	Image	Ownership / Access	Notes
Château de Bricquebec		Ruins			
Château de Gavray		Ruins			
Château de Gratot	14-18th century	Ruins			Ruins incorporated with later buildings.
Château de Pirou	12-14th century	Restored			Converted into farm, 18th century.
Château de Regnéville	14th century	Ruins			
Château de Saint-Sauveur-le-Vicomte	11-12th century	Ruins			

== Orne ==
Name	Date	Condition	Image	Ownership / Access	Notes
Château de Carrouges	14-18th century	Rebuilt			Remodelled 16-18th centuries.
Donjon de Chambois	12th century	Intact			Well-preserved Norman keep.
Château de Domfront	11th century	Ruins			
Château de Ducs d'Alençon	12-15th century	Intact			Gatehouse survives.

== Seine-Maritime ==
Name	Date	Condition	Image	Ownership / Access	Notes
Château d'Arques-la-Bataille	12-16th century	Ruins			
Château de Dieppe	12-15th century	Restored		Town of Dieppe	Largely reconstructed 1433, used as barracks until 1923.
Château de Fécamp	11-12th century	Ruins			
Château d'Orcher	13-14th century	Fragment			Keep survives, with later buildings.
Château de Robert-le-Diable	11-12th century	Partly habitable			
Château de Rouen	1204-1210	Restored			Keep survives, known as Tour Jeanne d'Arc, roof added 19th century.
Château de Tancarville	12th century	Habitable			
Manoir du Clap	16th-19th century	restored		Prévost Family	Now used as a guesthouse

== See also ==
- List of castles in France
- List of châteaux in France
