= Sienne =

Sienne may refer to the following:

== Places ==
- Canton of Quettreville-sur-Sienne, French canton
- Gavray-sur-Sienne, French commune
- Heugueville-sur-Sienne, French commune
- Noues de Sienne, French commune
- Orval-sur-Sienne, French commune
- Quettreville-sur-Sienne, French commune
- Tourville-sur-Sienne, French commune

== People ==
- Aldebrandin de Sienne, alternate name of Aldebrandin of Siena
- Catherine de Sienne, alternate name of Catherine of Siena

== Others ==
- Sienne (river), river in France

== See also ==
- Siena, an Italian town, and Siena_(disambiguation)
- Seine, a river in France, and Seine_(disambiguation)
- Syene, ancient name of Aswan, Egypt
