= Old Mill of Vernon =

- Vieux moulin de Vernon
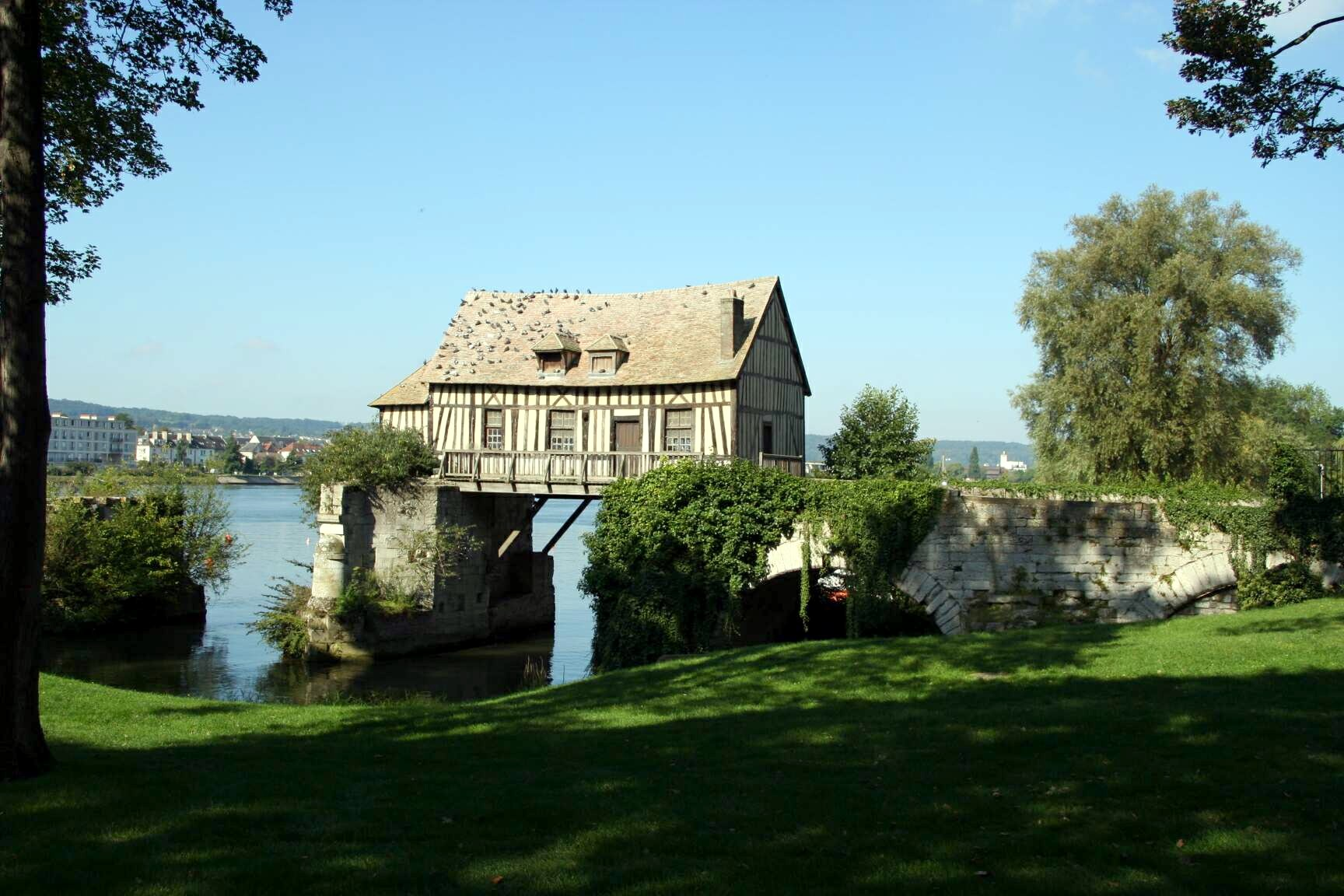
- The Vieux-Moulin standing on two piers of the medieval bridge

General information
- Status: Monument historique (listed in the General Inventory)
- Type: Watermill
- Architectural style: Half-timbered
- Location: Vernon, France
- Coordinates: 49.0974965°N 1.4880681°E
- Completed: 16th century (building); 12th century (piers)
- Owner: City of Vernon

Technical details
- Structural system: Bridge-mounted mill

The Old Mill (French: Vieux Moulin) of Vernon is a former watermill built upon the remains of a medieval bridge in the Eure department of the Normandy region, France. The iconic half-timbered house stands on two piers of the former 12th-century bridge spanning the Seine and is considered the primary landmark of the city. The structure is listed in the French General Inventory of Cultural Heritage and has been part of a protected natural site since 1943.

== Location ==
The mill is situated on the right bank of the Seine, near the Île du Talus and within sight of the Château des Tourelles. It sits directly above the remains of the medieval Pont de Vernonnet, which connected the districts of Vernonnet and Vernon until the 19th century.

== History ==
The bridge supporting the mill was constructed in the 12th century, traditionally attributed to King Philip Augustus. It replaced an even older structure possibly dating to the reign of Duke Henry I of Normandy. The medieval bridge complex served to secure the right bank of the Seine and was uniquely built parallel to the river flow in certain sections, deviating from the standard perpendicular construction.

The current timber-framed mill building dates to approximately the 16th century. It was designed as a moulin à eau à roue pendante (hanging-wheel watermill), a type common in Normandy where the water wheel could be raised or lowered to adjust to the river's current and water level. It was one of several structures originally integrated into the bridge's framework.

As milling technology evolved during the 19th century, the facility lost its original function and the internal machinery was eventually removed. Between 1925 and 1930, the Vieux-Moulin was owned by the composer and revue author Jean Nouguès, who attempted to operate a converted peniche (barge) as a floating dance hall alongside it; the vessel sank following an accident on 6 February 1927.

In 1930, Nouguès sold the property to an American, William Griffin. Following Griffin's death in 1947, the city of Vernon took over the restoration of the building, which had suffered significant damage during the heavy fighting of World War II.

== Architecture ==
The Old Mill is a two-story half-timbered house with a steep pitched roof. It is a rare surviving example of a "bridge-house" in France. In front of the mill stands the "arche orpheline" (orphan arch), the last surviving arched section of the bridge system. Behind it, the remains of four additional piers extend toward the Île du Talus.

== Heritage protection ==
The bridge remains and the mill have been part of a Site naturel classé (classified natural site) since 1943. The structure is also recorded in the Inventaire général du patrimoine culturel (IGPC) under reference number IA27000182.

== In popular culture ==
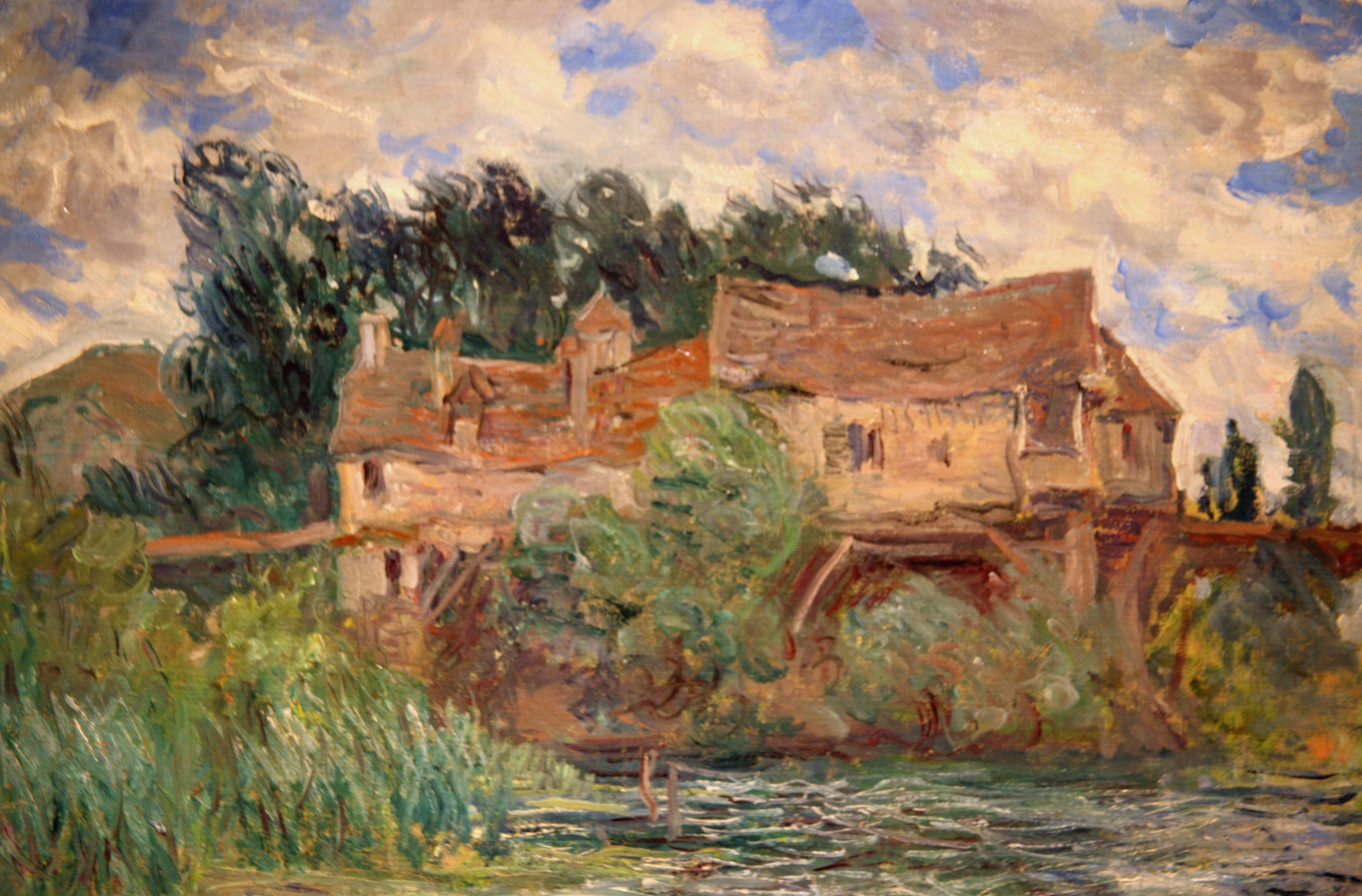
Claude Monet: Houses on the Old Bridge at Vernon (c. 1883)

The Vieux-Moulin is a famous subject for landscape artists. Around 1883, Claude Monet captured the building in several paintings, including Maisons sur le vieux pont à Vernon, currently held by the New Orleans Museum of Art.

The building also served as a filming location for the 1962 film Les Mystères de Paris, starring Jean Marais.
