= Château de Regnéville =

14th-century castle in Manche, France

Coordinates: 49°0′27″N 1°33′11″W

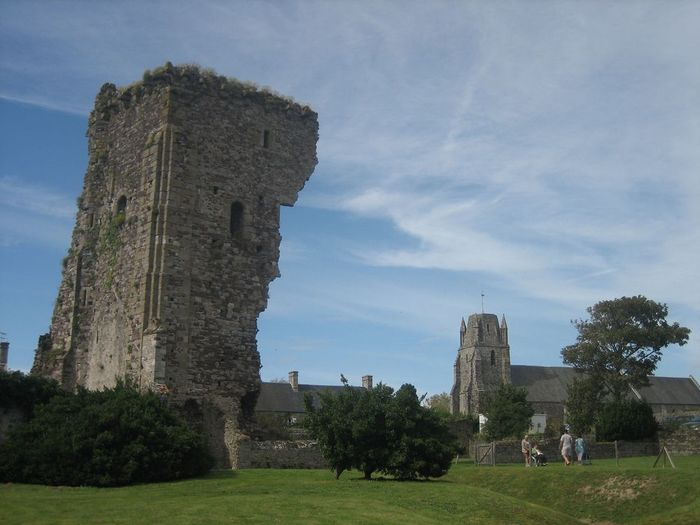
The castle and church at Regnéville

The Château de Regnéville (French pronunciation: [ʃato də ʁəɲevil]) is a ruined 14th-century castle in the commune of Regnéville-sur-Mer in the Manche département of France. Built at the edge of the Sienne river estuary, it was intended to protect the important dry harbour of Regnéville-sur-Mer, one of the most active of the Cotentin Peninsula from the Middle Ages until the 17th century. Partly dismantled at the end of the Hundred Years' War, it was much altered during the 17th and 18th centuries. Today it is the property of the département. Archaeological excavations and restoration work are gradually bringing it back to life.

== History of the castle ==
The fortress was founded in the 12th century and the major remains date from the 14th century. It was then composed of an upper courtyard in the east, whose foundations were partially revealed at the time of the excavations carried out in 1991 to 1993. The large tower, of which there remain only two of the four sides, was located at the north-east of this upper courtyard. In the west, facing the harbour, the lower courtyard was originally the royal residence of Charles the Bad.

=== Charles, King of Navarre ===
In 1336, the fiefdom of Regnéville passed into the hands of the Navarre. In 1349, Charles the Bad, king of Navarre, inherited the Norman possessions of his father, the count of Evreux. In 1364, Charles V ascended the French throne. The supporters of Charles the Bad, allied with the English, held Normandy, relying on numerous castles. Regnéville received important work to reinforce its fortifications.

At the beginning of May 1378, the fortress of Regnéville was taken by French troops. After the death of Charles V in 1380, his son Charles VI returned his lands to Charles the Bad. Eventually, Regnéville left the Navarrese inheritance to finally join the kingdom of France.

=== English occupation ===
In March 1418, the Duke of Gloucester seized the castle. In 1435, the captain of the castle was Hue Spencer. He was the baillif of Cotentin for the king of England, combining high administrative office and military command. Until 1448, he made Regnéville his residence. On 19 September 1449, the fortress was retaken from the English by the constable of Richemont.

=== The later history of the castle ===
In 1603, the fiefdom of Regnéville was sold to Isaac de Piennes, lord of Bricqueville. In 1626, King Louis XIII ordered the demolition of the fortifications of cities and castles which were not at the borders of France or considered to be important to the kingdom. The castle was razed in 1637. The keep, filled with powder, burst and split from top to bottom, along the spiral staircase.

The lords of Piennes lived in the place until the 18th century.

In the middle of the 19th century, Victor Bunel installed a mechanical sawmill for cutting marble in the former lower courtyard.

The castle was acquired by the Conseil Général de la Manche (département council) and classified as a monument historique by the French Ministry of Culture in 1989. The restoration of the castle, undertaken in 1994, seeks to restore the appearance at the time of Roulland de Gourfaleur, at the end of the 16th century.

== The keep ==
In the north-eastern corner of the upper courtyard of the castle is a rectangular tower some 20 metres (~65 ft) in height, the thickness of the walls exceeding three metres (10 ft). Four storeys, including three arched, were served by a spiral staircase, rebuilt in the 16th century and still visible nowadays. At the ground floor, a cellar was used to store supplies.

In the 16th century, Roulland de Gourfaleur made bays in the western and southern sides of the keep. These openings led to a balcony supported by a pair of large double corbels.

== See also ==
- List of castles in France

== References and sources ==
Source : Direction des sites et musées – Conseil général de la Manche
