= Brainville, Manche =

Brainville
- Commune
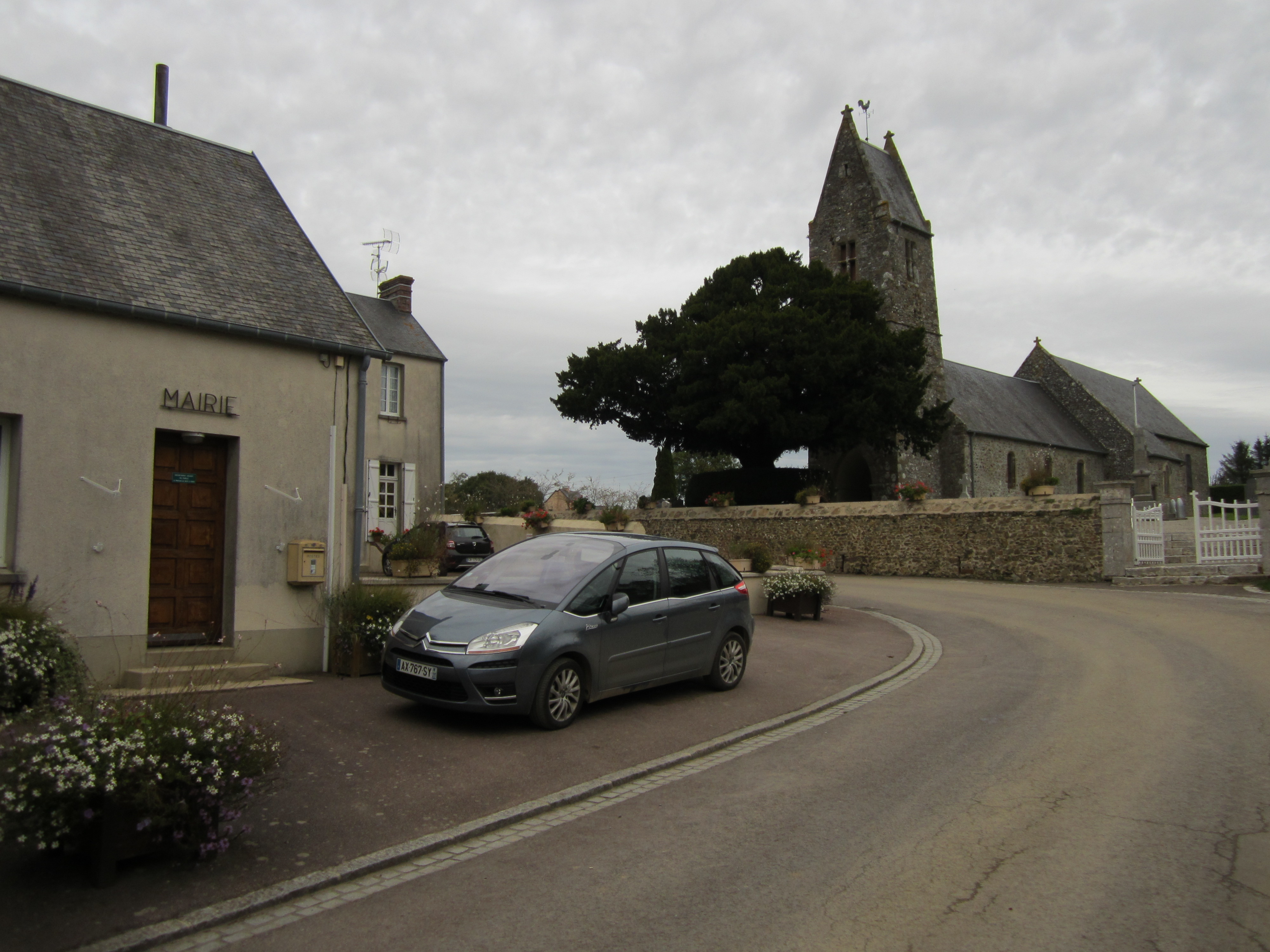
- Town hall and the church of Saint-Aubin
- Location of Brainville
- Location within France Location within Normandy
- Coordinates: 49°05′13″N 1°29′49″W
- Country: France
- Region: Normandy
- Department: Manche
- Arrondissement: Coutances
- Canton: Coutances

Government
  - Mayor (2020–2026): Michel Lemiere
- Area^{1}: 3.19 km^{2} (1.23 sq mi)
- Elevation: 92 m (302 ft)
- Highest elevation: 99 m (325 ft)
- Lowest elevation: 50 m (160 ft)
- Population (2023): 214
  - Density: 67.1/km^{2} (174/sq mi)
- Time zone: UTC+01:00 (CET)
  - Summer (DST): UTC+02:00 (CEST)
- INSEE/Postal code: 50072 /50200
- ^{1} French Land Register data, which excludes lakes, ponds, glaciers > 1 km^{2} (0.386 sq mi or 247 acres) and river estuaries.

Brainville (French pronunciation: [bʁɛ̃vil]) is a commune in the Manche department in Normandy in northwestern France.

== Population ==
Historical population
Year	Pop.	±% p.a.
1968	146	—
1975	141	−0.50%
1982	118	−2.51%
1990	131	+1.31%
1999	120	−0.97%
2007	177	+4.98%
2012	226	+5.01%
2017	215	−0.99%
2023	214	−0.08%
Source: INSEE

== See also ==
- Communes of the Manche department
