= Canton of Coutances =

Administrative division of the Manche department, France

Coordinates: 49.05°N 1.44°W

The canton of Coutances is an administrative division of the Manche department, northwestern France. Its borders were modified at the French canton reorganisation which came into effect in March 2015. Its seat is in Coutances.

It consists of the following communes:

1. Brainville
2. Bricqueville-la-Blouette
3. Cambernon
4. Camprond
5. Courcy
6. Coutances
7. Gratot
8. Heugueville-sur-Sienne
9. Monthuchon
10. Nicorps
11. Orval-sur-Sienne
12. Regnéville-sur-Mer
13. Saint-Pierre-de-Coutances
14. Saussey
15. Tourville-sur-Sienne
16. La Vendelée
