= Cambernon =

- Commune
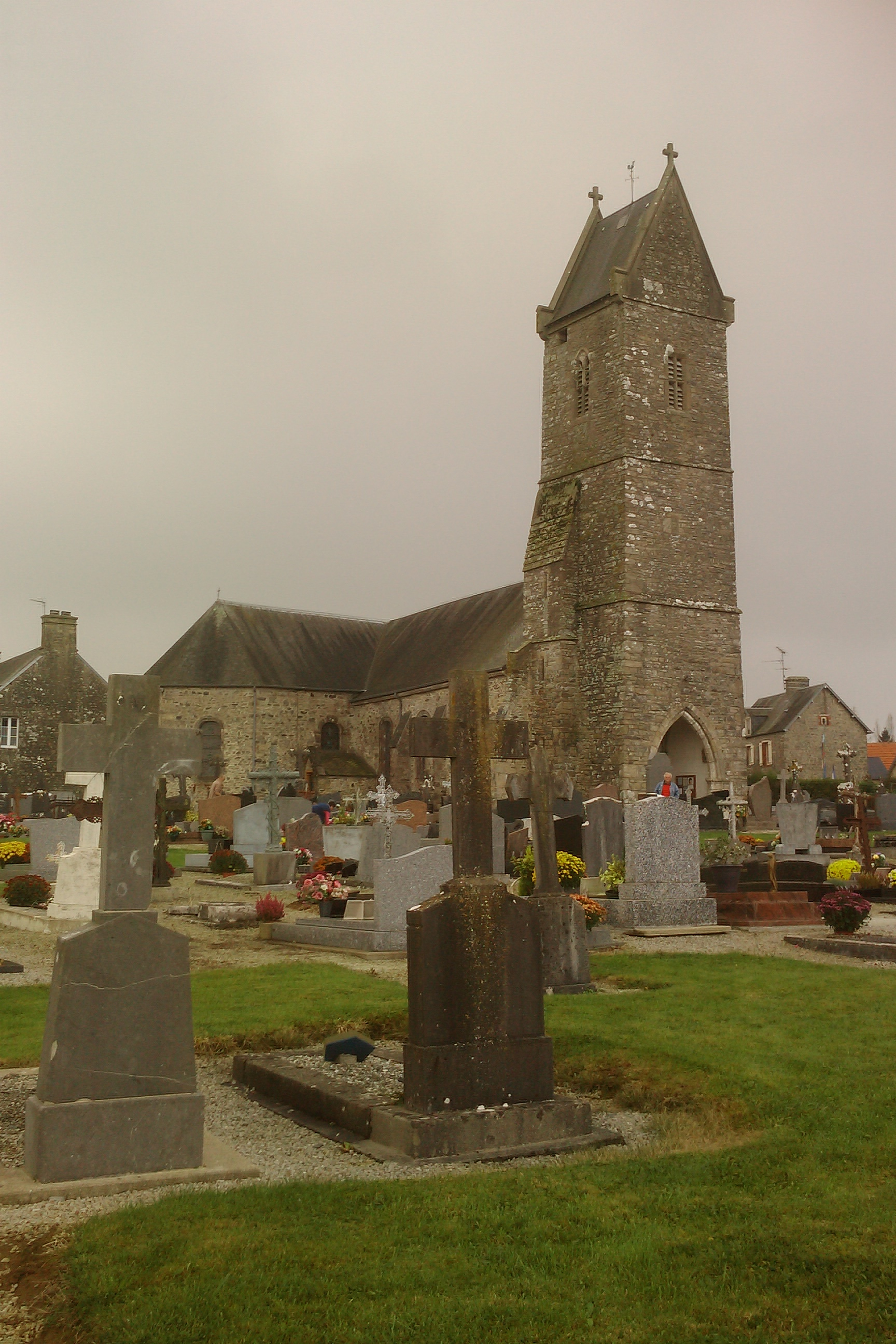
- The church of Notre-Dame en l'Assomption
- Location of Cambernon
- Location within France Location within Normandy
- Coordinates: 49°04′52″N 1°23′04″W
- Country: France
- Region: Normandy
- Department: Manche
- Arrondissement: Coutances
- Canton: Coutances
- Intercommunality: Coutances Mer et Bocage

Government
  - Mayor (2020–2026): Philippe Vaugeois
- Area^{1}: 17.01 km^{2} (6.57 sq mi)
- Elevation: 158 m (518 ft)
- Highest elevation: 177 m (581 ft)
- Lowest elevation: 57 m (187 ft)
- Population (2023): 677
  - Density: 39.8/km^{2} (103/sq mi)
- Demonym: Cambernonais
- Time zone: UTC+01:00 (CET)
  - Summer (DST): UTC+02:00 (CEST)
- INSEE/Postal code: 50092 /50200
- ^{1} French Land Register data, which excludes lakes, ponds, glaciers > 1 km^{2} (0.386 sq mi or 247 acres) and river estuaries.

Cambernon (French pronunciation: [kɑ̃bɛʁnɔ̃]) is a commune in the Manche department in Normandy in north-western France.

== See also ==
- Communes of the Manche department
