= Saint-Pierre-de-Coutances =

- Commune
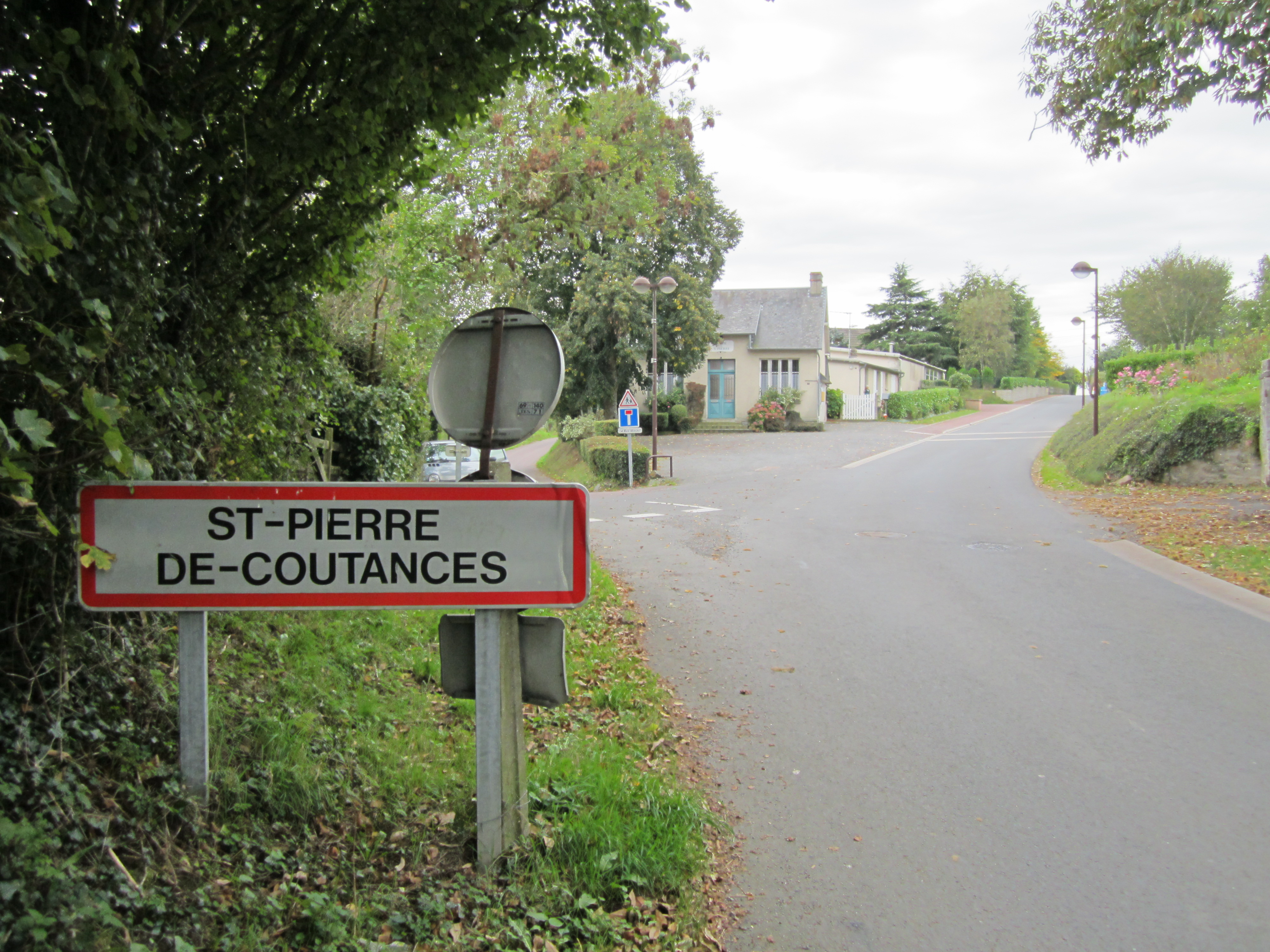
- Entrance of the village (from the south-west)
- Location of Saint-Pierre-de-Coutances
- Location within France Location within Normandy
- Coordinates: 49°02′10″N 1°26′53″W
- Country: France
- Region: Normandy
- Department: Manche
- Arrondissement: Coutances
- Canton: Coutances
- Intercommunality: Coutances Mer et Bocage

Government
  - Mayor (2020–2026): Grégory Galbadon
- Area^{1}: 4.04 km^{2} (1.56 sq mi)
- Elevation: 47 m (154 ft)
- Highest elevation: 125 m (410 ft)
- Lowest elevation: 11 m (36 ft)
- Population (2023): 387
  - Density: 95.8/km^{2} (248/sq mi)
- Time zone: UTC+01:00 (CET)
  - Summer (DST): UTC+02:00 (CEST)
- INSEE/Postal code: 50537 /50200
- ^{1} French Land Register data, which excludes lakes, ponds, glaciers > 1 km^{2} (0.386 sq mi or 247 acres) and river estuaries.

Saint-Pierre-de-Coutances (French pronunciation: [sɛ̃ pjɛʁ də kutɑ̃s], literally Saint-Pierre of Coutances) is a commune in the Manche department in Normandy in north-western France.

== See also ==
- Communes of the Manche department
