= Seine (disambiguation) =

The Seine is a river in France.

Seine may also refer to:

== Places ==
- Seine (department), a former administrative subdivision of France encompassing Paris and its immediate suburbs
- Seine River (disambiguation)
  - Seine River (Ontario), Canada
  - Seine River (Manitoba), Canada
  - Seine River (electoral district), Manitoba, Canada

== Other uses ==
- Seine, a type of fishing net, used in seine fishing
- MV Seine a Dutch coaster
- Seine (Van Gogh series), a group of paintings by Vincent van Gogh
- "La Seine", a 1948 song by Guy Lafarge
- "La Seine", a 2012 song by Vanessa Paradis

== See also ==
- "Jedem das Seine", a German proverb
- La Seyne, a commune in the Var department, France
- Zenne, a river in Belgium
