= Bricqueville =

- Commune
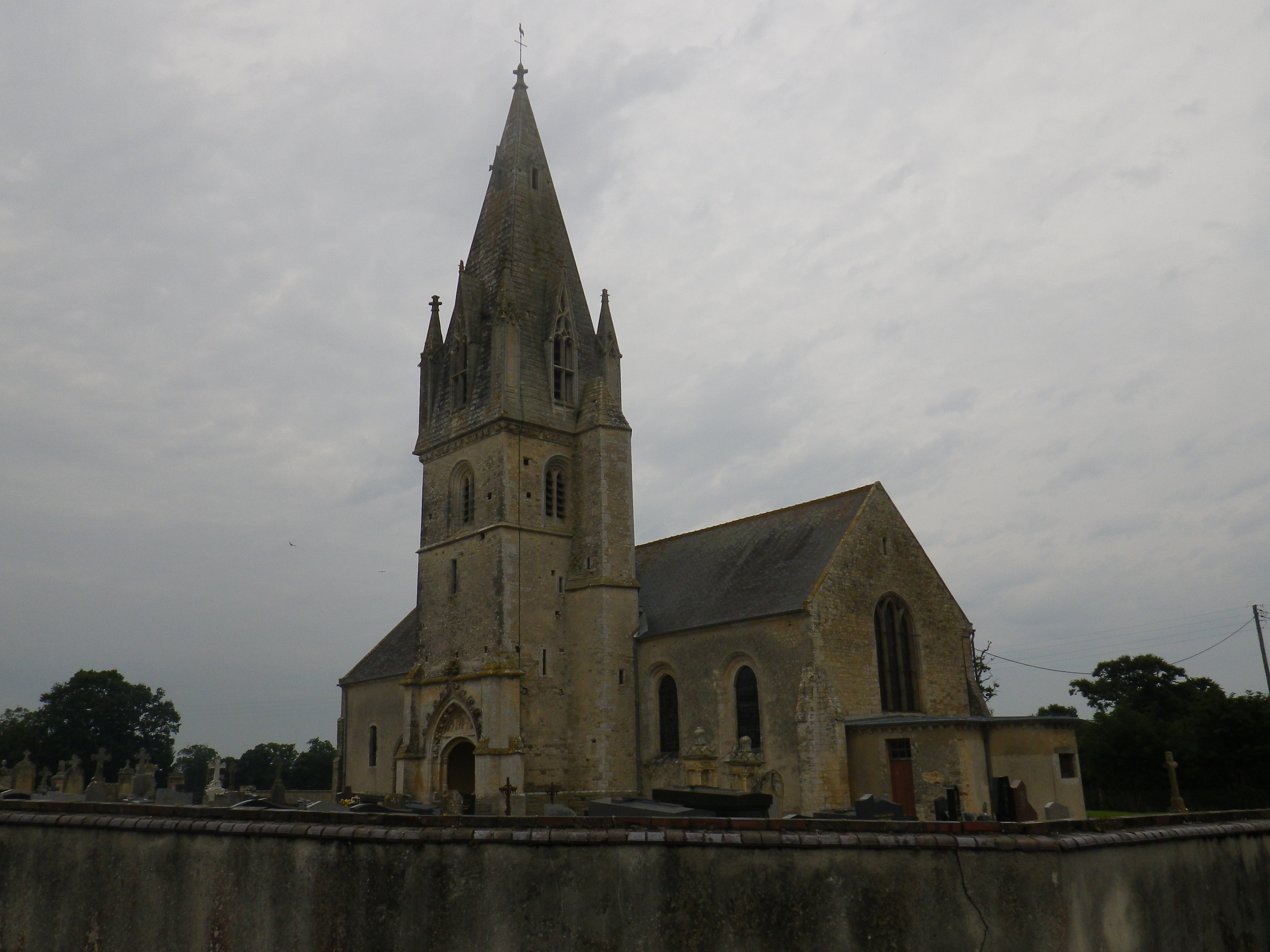
- The church in Bricqueville

- Coat of arms
- Location of Bricqueville
- Location within France Location within Normandy
- Coordinates: 49°17′27″N 0°57′40″W
- Country: France
- Region: Normandy
- Department: Calvados
- Arrondissement: Bayeux
- Canton: Trévières
- Intercommunality: CC Isigny-Omaha Intercom

Government
  - Mayor (2020–2026): Daniel Pain
- Area^{1}: 6.7 km^{2} (2.6 sq mi)
- Elevation: 28 m (92 ft)
- Highest elevation: 42 m (138 ft)
- Lowest elevation: 0 m (0 ft)
- Population (2023): 151
  - Density: 23/km^{2} (58/sq mi)
- Time zone: UTC+01:00 (CET)
  - Summer (DST): UTC+02:00 (CEST)
- INSEE/Postal code: 14107 /14710
- ^{1} French Land Register data, which excludes lakes, ponds, glaciers > 1 km^{2} (0.386 sq mi or 247 acres) and river estuaries.

Bricqueville (French pronunciation: [bʁikvil]) is a commune in the Calvados department in the Normandy region in northwestern France.

== Population ==
Historical population
Year	Pop.	±% p.a.
1968	216	—
1975	183	−2.34%
1982	129	−4.87%
1990	116	−1.32%
1999	110	−0.59%
2007	130	+2.11%
2012	142	+1.78%
2017	183	+5.20%
2023	151	−3.15%
Source: INSEE

== See also ==
- Communes of the Calvados department
- Bricqueville-la-Blouette
- Bricqueville-sur-Mer
