= Saussey, Manche =

Saussey
- Commune
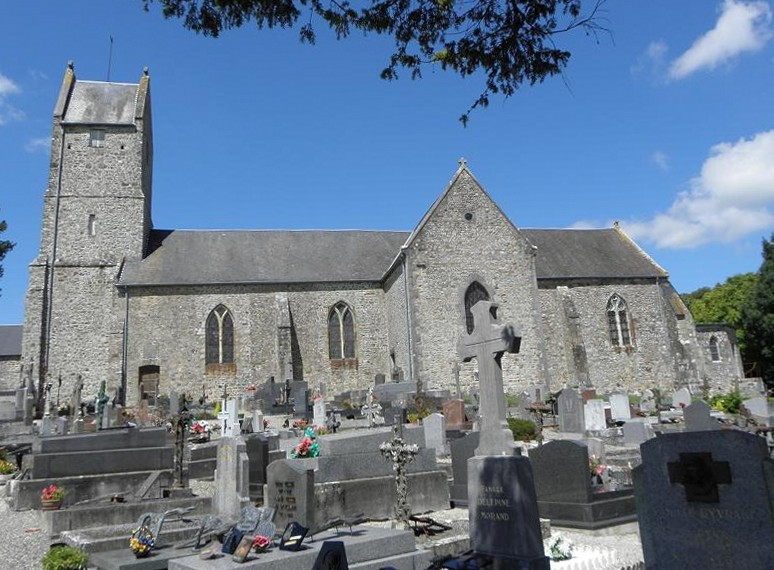
- The church of Saint-Martin
- Location of Saussey
- Location within France Location within Normandy
- Coordinates: 49°00′37″N 1°25′56″W
- Country: France
- Region: Normandy
- Department: Manche
- Arrondissement: Coutances
- Canton: Coutances

Government
  - Mayor (2020–2026): Philippe D'Anterroches
- Area^{1}: 8.89 km^{2} (3.43 sq mi)
- Elevation: 75 m (246 ft)
- Highest elevation: 108 m (354 ft)
- Lowest elevation: 10 m (33 ft)
- Population (2023): 463
  - Density: 52.1/km^{2} (135/sq mi)
- Time zone: UTC+01:00 (CET)
  - Summer (DST): UTC+02:00 (CEST)
- INSEE/Postal code: 50568 /50200
- ^{1} French Land Register data, which excludes lakes, ponds, glaciers > 1 km^{2} (0.386 sq mi or 247 acres) and river estuaries.

Saussey (French pronunciation: [sosɛ]) is a commune in the Manche department in Normandy in north-western France.

== See also ==
- Communes of the Manche department
