= Monthuchon =

- Commune
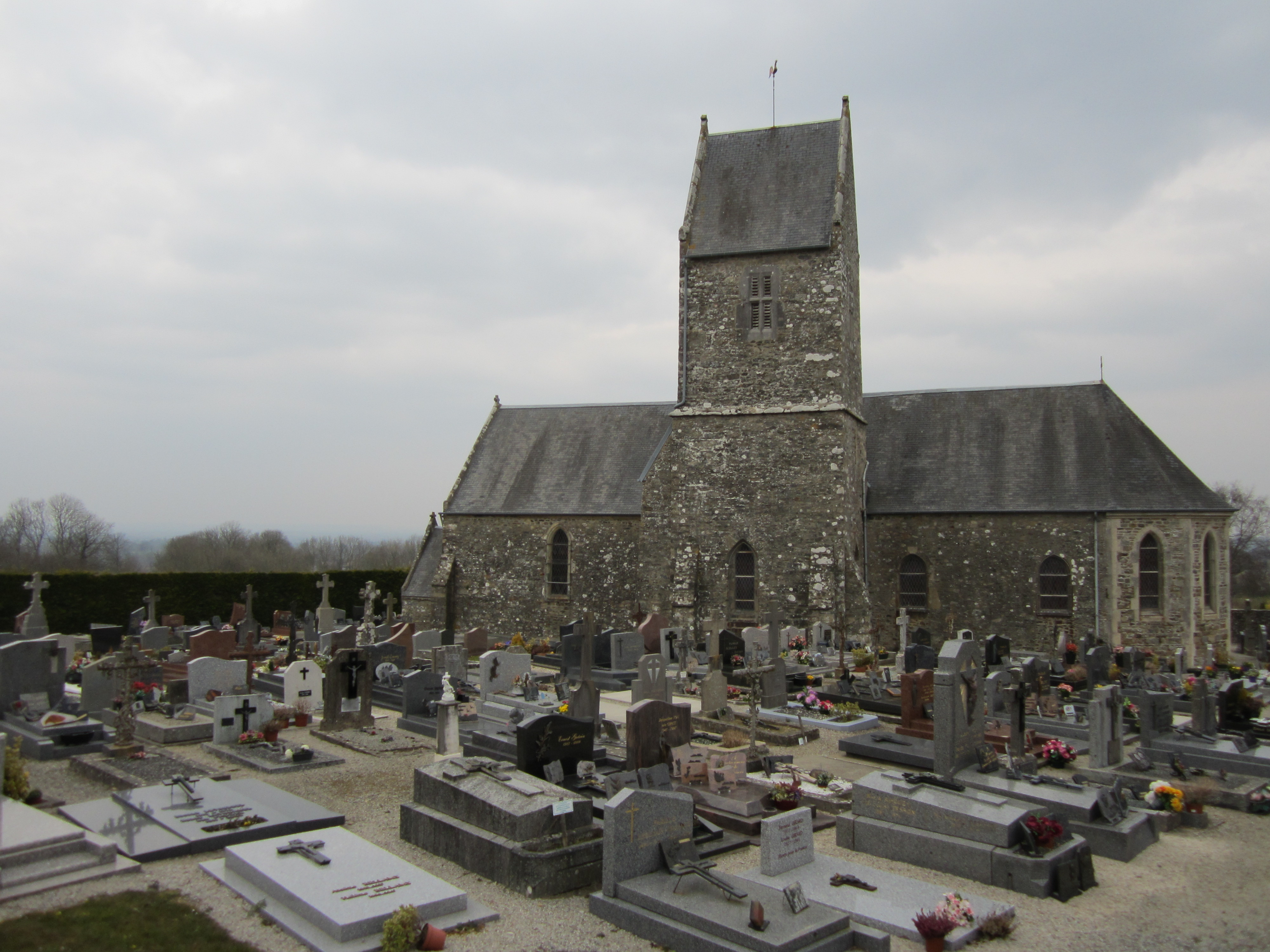
- The church of Saint-Martin
- Location of Monthuchon
- Location within France Location within Normandy
- Coordinates: 49°04′59″N 1°25′14″W
- Country: France
- Region: Normandy
- Department: Manche
- Arrondissement: Coutances
- Canton: Coutances
- Intercommunality: Coutances Mer et Bocage

Government
  - Mayor (2020–2026): Jacques Marie
- Area^{1}: 7.66 km^{2} (2.96 sq mi)
- Elevation: 176 m (577 ft)
- Highest elevation: 176 m (577 ft)
- Lowest elevation: 69 m (226 ft)
- Population (2023): 705
  - Density: 92.0/km^{2} (238/sq mi)
- Time zone: UTC+01:00 (CET)
  - Summer (DST): UTC+02:00 (CEST)
- INSEE/Postal code: 50345 /50200
- ^{1} French Land Register data, which excludes lakes, ponds, glaciers > 1 km^{2} (0.386 sq mi or 247 acres) and river estuaries.

Monthuchon (French pronunciation: [mɔ̃tyʃɔ̃]) is a commune in the Manche department in Normandy in northwestern France, about 5 km north of Coutances.

It is located on the main D971 road from Périers to Coutances, at the south of the Cherbourg peninsular.

The parish church, dedicated to St Martin, dates back to the 16th century.

Leon Legrand, the former Prefect of Wallis and Futuna, was born in Monthuchon.

== See also ==
- Communes of the Manche department
