= Camprond =

- Commune
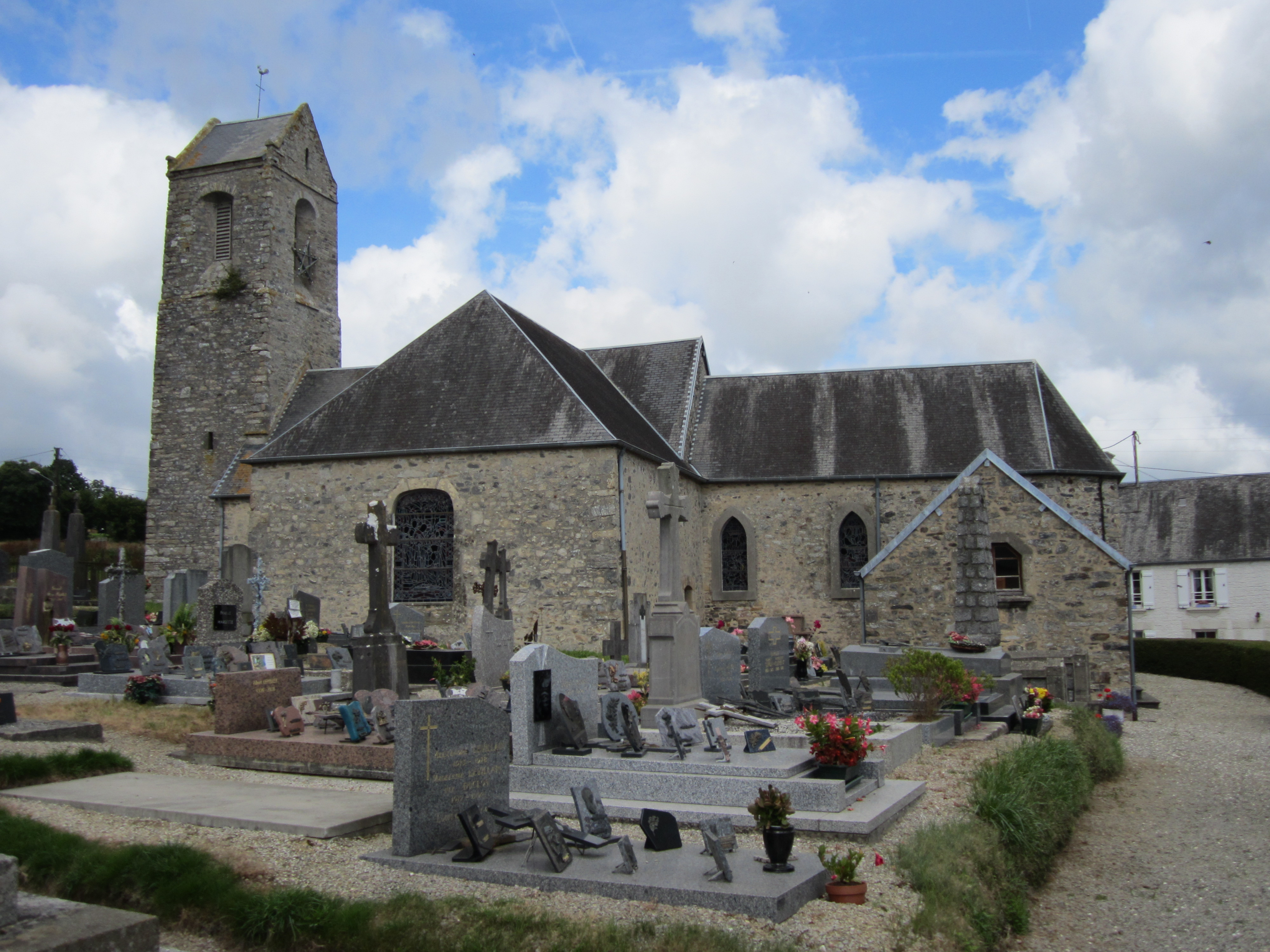
- The church of Saint-Pierre
- Location of Camprond
- Location within France Location within Normandy
- Coordinates: 49°05′21″N 1°20′48″W
- Country: France
- Region: Normandy
- Department: Manche
- Arrondissement: Coutances
- Canton: Coutances

Government
  - Mayor (2020–2026): Jacques Morel
- Area^{1}: 6.27 km^{2} (2.42 sq mi)
- Elevation: 130 m (430 ft)
- Highest elevation: 178 m (584 ft)
- Lowest elevation: 70 m (230 ft)
- Population (2023): 374
  - Density: 59.6/km^{2} (154/sq mi)
- Time zone: UTC+01:00 (CET)
  - Summer (DST): UTC+02:00 (CEST)
- INSEE/Postal code: 50094 /50210
- ^{1} French Land Register data, which excludes lakes, ponds, glaciers > 1 km^{2} (0.386 sq mi or 247 acres) and river estuaries.

Camprond (French pronunciation: [kɑ̃pʁɔ̃]) is a commune in the Manche department in Normandy in north-western France.

== See also ==
- Communes of the Manche department
