= La Vendelée =

- Commune
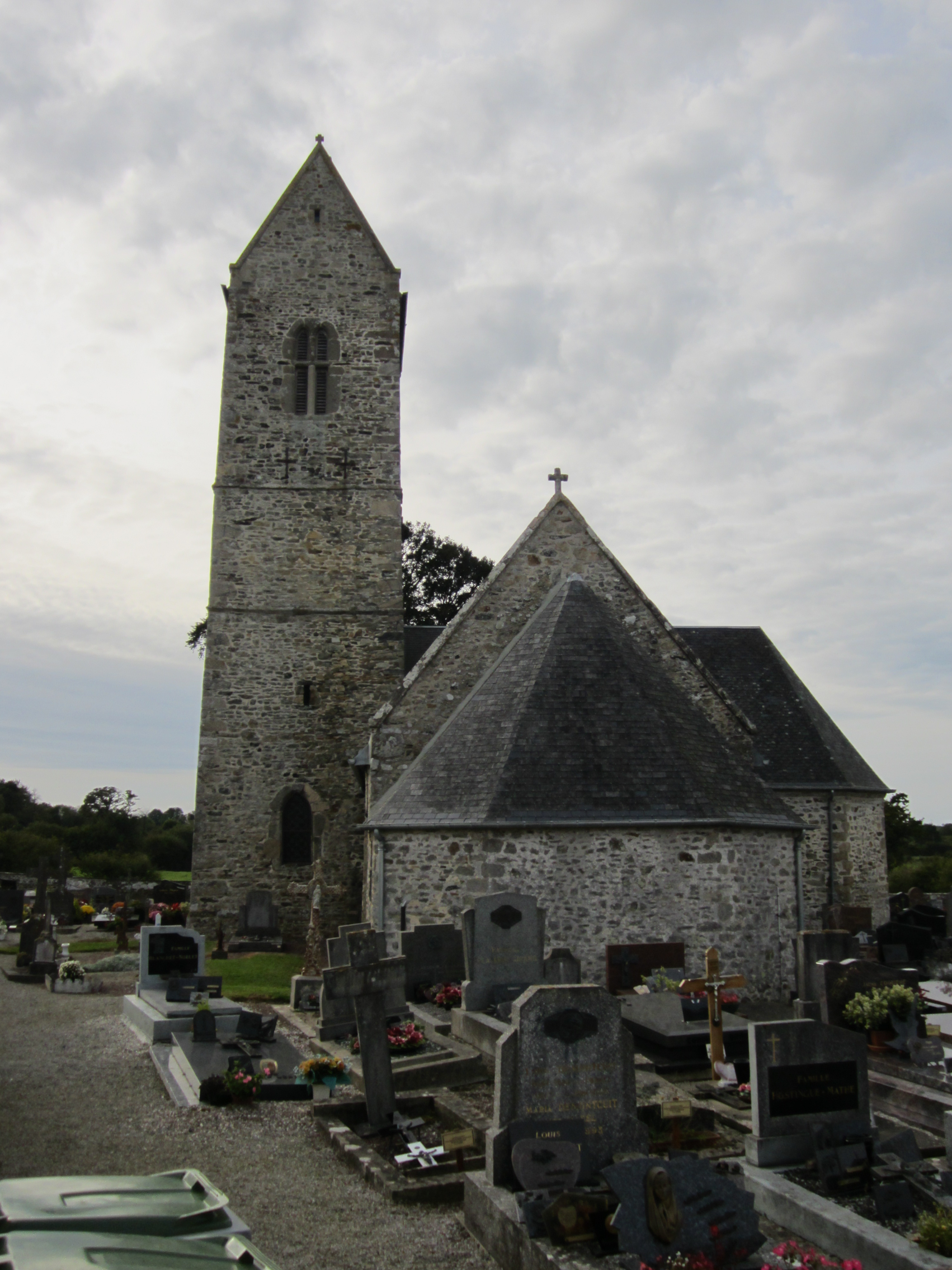
- Saint-Sébastien church
- Location of La Vendelée
- Location within France Location within Normandy
- Coordinates: 49°04′54″N 1°27′41″W
- Country: France
- Region: Normandy
- Department: Manche
- Arrondissement: Coutances
- Canton: Coutances
- Intercommunality: Coutances Mer et Bocage

Government
  - Mayor (2020–2026): Jean-Pierre Bellée
- Area^{1}: 5.04 km^{2} (1.95 sq mi)
- Elevation: 100 m (330 ft)
- Highest elevation: 139 m (456 ft)
- Lowest elevation: 60 m (200 ft)
- Population (2023): 459
  - Density: 91.1/km^{2} (236/sq mi)
- Time zone: UTC+01:00 (CET)
  - Summer (DST): UTC+02:00 (CEST)
- INSEE/Postal code: 50624 /50200
- ^{1} French Land Register data, which excludes lakes, ponds, glaciers > 1 km^{2} (0.386 sq mi or 247 acres) and river estuaries.

La Vendelée (French pronunciation: [la vɑ̃dle]) is a commune in the Manche department in Normandy in north-western France.

== See also ==
- Communes of the Manche department
