= Château de Gratot =

Medieval castle in Gratot, Normandy, France

Coordinates: 49°4′5″N 1°29′24″W

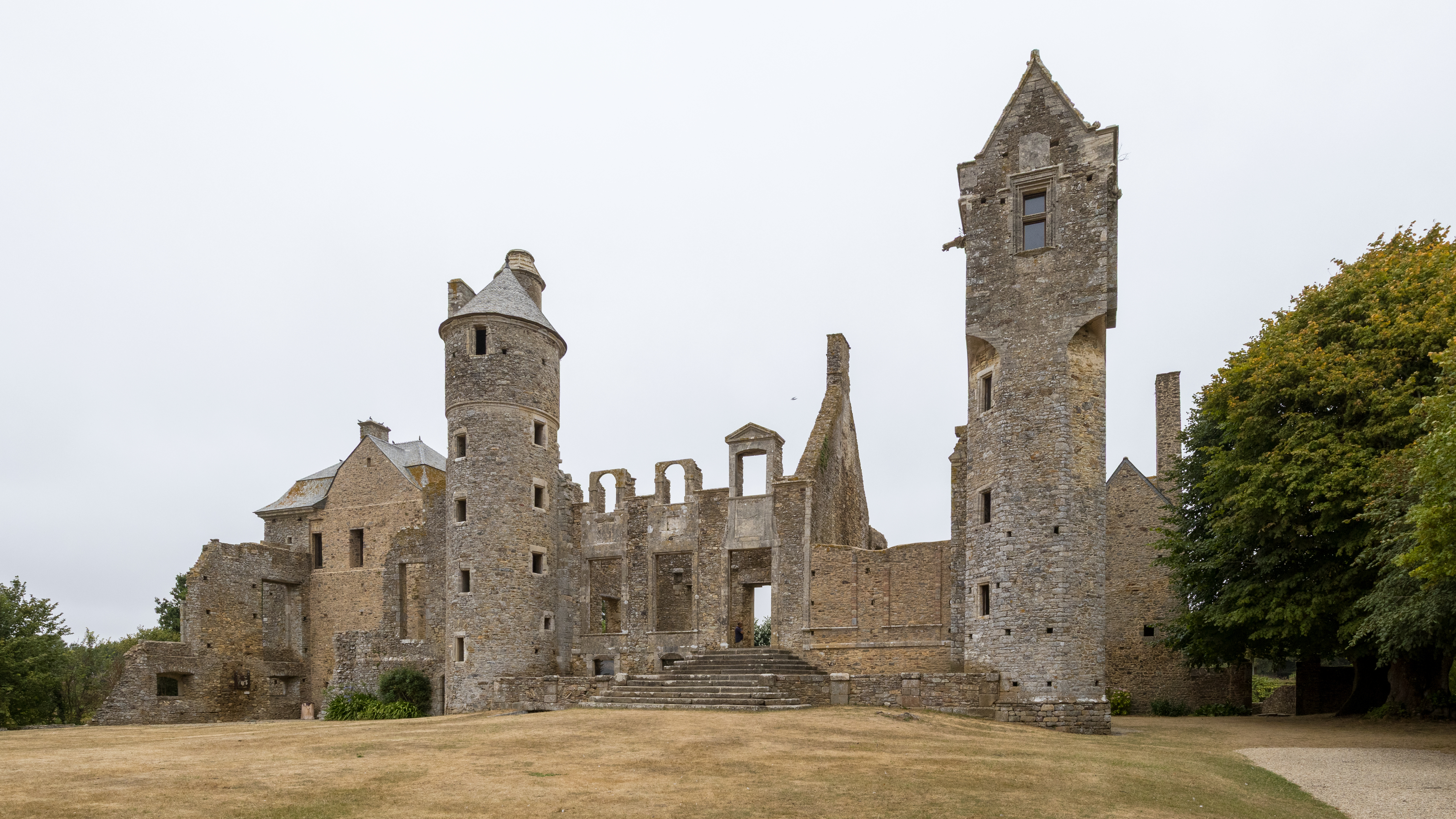
The round tower and Fairy tower of Château de Gratot

The château de Gratot is a ruined medieval castle in the commune of Gratot, in the Manche département of Normandy, France. It has been classified by the French Government as a Monument historique.

It is located only a few kilometers from the English Channel.

== History ==
The first Château de Gratot was built during the 14th century, but underwent many transformations until the 18th century. It was constructed by the family of Argouges, barons of Gratot: they sold the castle in 1771. The castle is built in a number of styles, the most recent addition being a pavilion built in the 18th century.

The castle was neglected in the 19th century, and was used as a fodder warehouse for local farmers. It was definitively abandoned at the start of the 20th century. Since 1968 it has been recovering its past glories owing to a team of volunteers who restore it lovingly. The main restoration work took place in the late 60's and 70's, requiring tonnes of rubble to be removed from the cellars and ground floor, and the castle grounds to be cleared of undergrowth. Since then some buildings, including two of the towers, have been rebuilt, including adding wooden roofs to the towers and some buildings. Historical documents and 19th-century paintings showing the castle as a romantic ruin were used to guide reconstruction efforts. The 18th-century pavilion has been fully restored with roof, floors, a staircase, windows and electricity, allowing it to be used for exhibitions and cultural events. The latest renovation work concentrates on the formal gardens: only the shape of the gardens can currently be seen, with no paths or planting

Nearly 12,600 visitors went to the castle during 2003. It is now classed as a Monument historique (Historic monument) by the French Ministry of Culture. It is open to the public all year round. During the summer months there is a welcome desk and gift shop: the remainder of the year guidebooks are available to visitors to guide themselves around.

== Architecture ==
=== Main entry ===
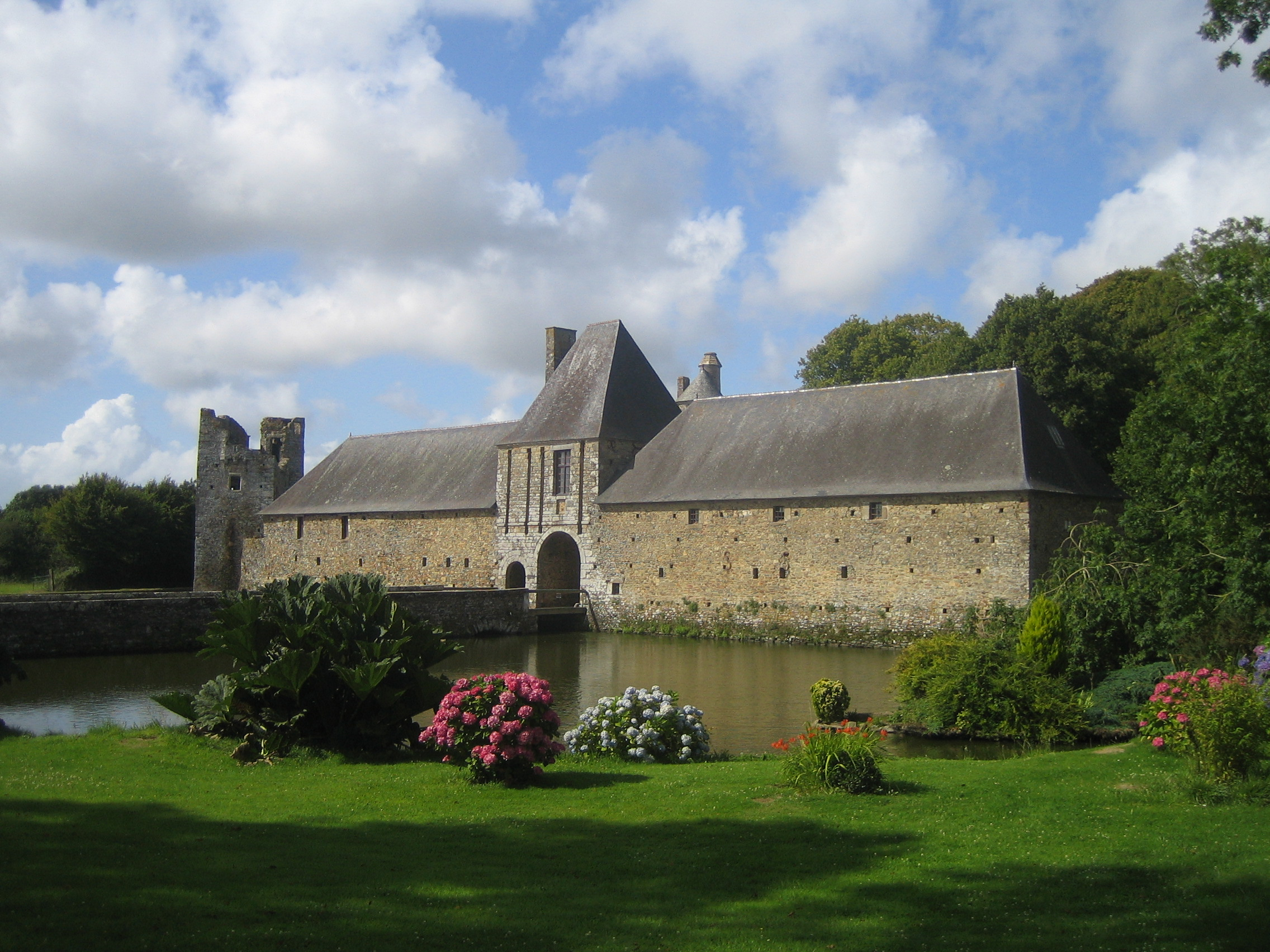
Bridge and main entry

A little bridge with three arches spans the moat and gives access to the porch. The outhouses are located on both sides of the postern. A tower is raised in the west corner.

=== Residence ===
The main residence building, now in 18th century style, originally had three floors and nearly fifteen rooms. The roof is à la Mansart. Large windows open into the ground floor, and high spire lights at the first floor.

=== Round tower ===
The round tower of the castle was erected in the 15th century and has a medieval look. A sudden narrowing in the spiral staircase prevents two attackers ascending simultaneously. The entry to the cellars opens at the bottom of the tower. At the top of the tower is a guards' room where remnants of mediaeval wall paintings may still be seen.

Another angle tower from the medieval period (13th century) remains: the door has been walled up.

=== The Fairy tower ===
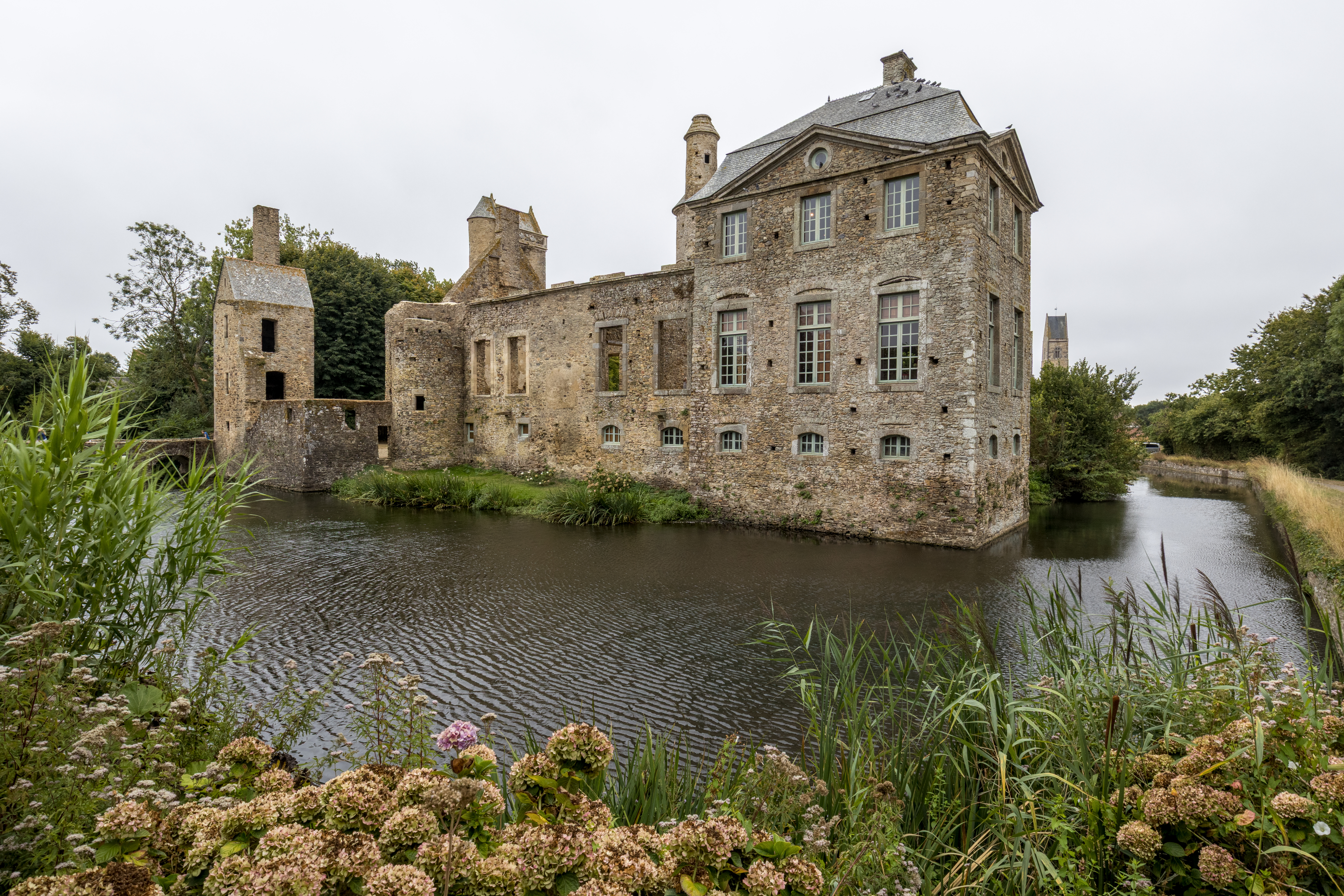

The Fairy tower (French: La tour de la fée) was constructed at the end of the 15th century, and is supported by strong buttresses. The base is octagonal, and is finished by a rectangular room: the roof has two panels. The top is decorated by balusters and gargoyles.

According to the legend, a lord of Argouges met a very beautiful young woman at a well. He immediately fell in love, and asked her to marry him. The beauty said she was a fairy, and would accept to be his wife only if he would never say the word "death". The lord promised. One day, during a feast at the castle, the lord was upset at having to wait while his wife was dressing and said: ”Madam, you are very slow in your tasks! You would be good to send to fetch death, as you take so much time.” Then the fairy shouted, climbed onto the window sill and disappeared, leaving her handprint on the sill.

This legend is known as the legend of Melusina and was probably appropriated by the Argouges family to add prestige, or to explain some event in the family's past.

=== Outbuildings ===
The outbuildings were constructed around the end of the 16th century. In a hall near the entrance is an exhibition called "Eight centuries of life" (French: Huit siècles de vie), about the history of the castle and the different steps of its restoration. As a cultural center, the castle regularly houses artistic events (painting, sculptures) and an annual theatrical production.

== See also ==
- List of castles in France
