= Sienne (river) =

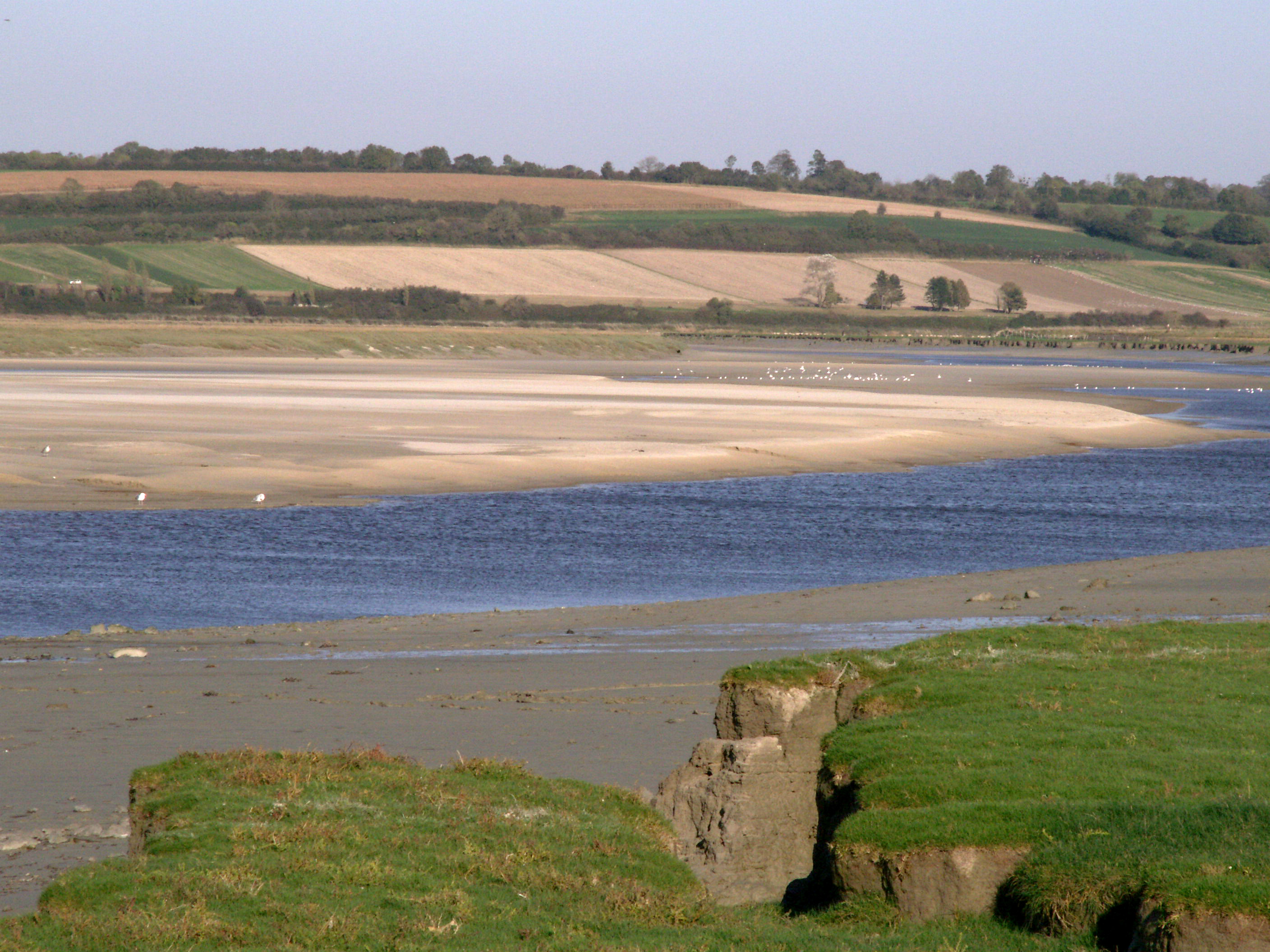
- Sienne estuary near Regnéville-sur-Mer

Location
- Country: France

Physical characteristics
- Mouth: English Channel
  - coordinates: 49°00′22″N 1°34′05″W
- Length: 92.6 km (57.5 mi)

The Sienne (French pronunciation: [sjɛn]) is a 92.6 km (57.5 mi) long river in northwestern France located in the departments of Calvados and Manche, Normandy. It flows into the English Channel near Regnéville-sur-Mer. Its longest tributaries are the Soulles and the Airou. The largest towns on the Sienne are Villedieu-les-Poêles and Quettreville-sur-Sienne.
