= Gratot =

- Commune
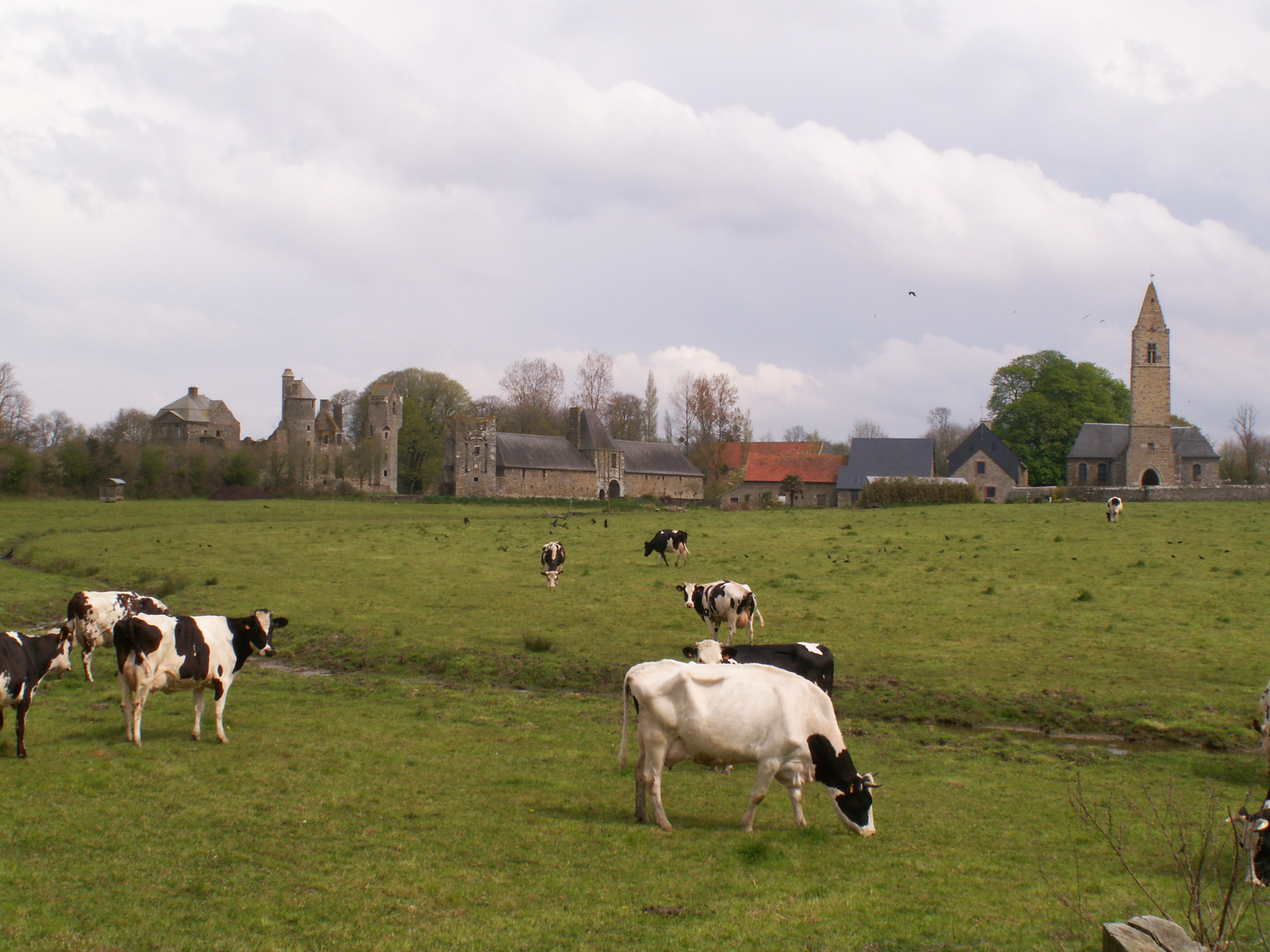
- The castle and church

- Coat of arms
- Location of Gratot
- Location within France Location within Normandy
- Coordinates: 49°03′57″N 1°29′11″W
- Country: France
- Region: Normandy
- Department: Manche
- Arrondissement: Coutances
- Canton: Coutances

Government
  - Mayor (2020–2026): Rémi Bellail
- Area^{1}: 10.73 km^{2} (4.14 sq mi)
- Elevation: 80 m (260 ft)
- Highest elevation: 147 m (482 ft)
- Lowest elevation: 33 m (108 ft)
- Population (2023): 679
  - Density: 63.3/km^{2} (164/sq mi)
- Demonym: Gratotais
- Time zone: UTC+01:00 (CET)
  - Summer (DST): UTC+02:00 (CEST)
- INSEE/Postal code: 50219 /50200
- ^{1} French Land Register data, which excludes lakes, ponds, glaciers > 1 km^{2} (0.386 sq mi or 247 acres) and river estuaries.

Gratot (French pronunciation: [ɡʁato]) is a commune in the Manche department in north-western France.

== See also ==
- Communes of the Manche department
