= Aldebrandin of Siena =

Italian physician

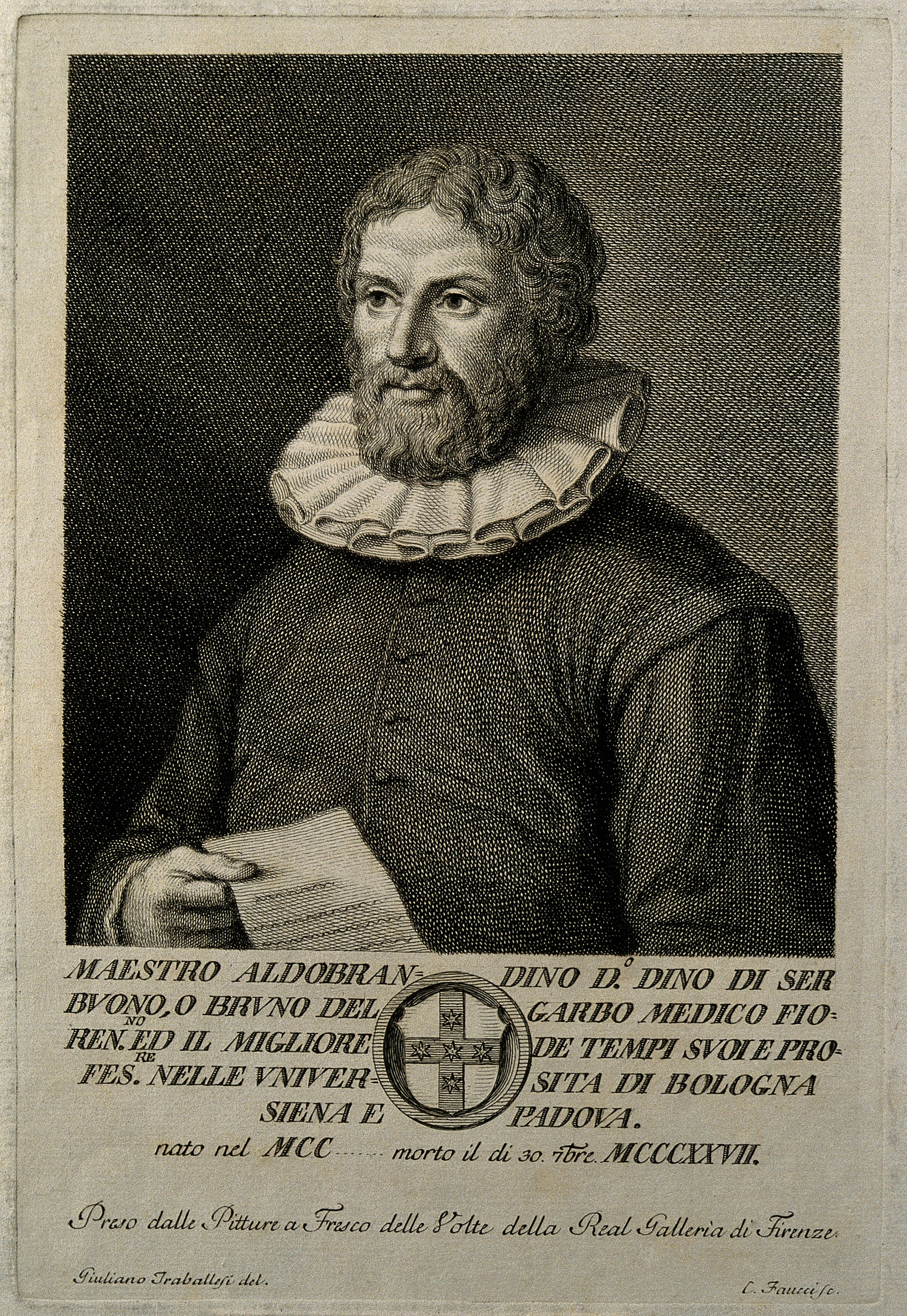
Aldobrandino da Siena

Aldebrandin of Siena (died 1296/1299?) was an Italian physician known for his 1256 sanitation guidebook Le Régime du corps. He lived in Siena and Troyes.
