= Regnéville-sur-Mer =

- Commune
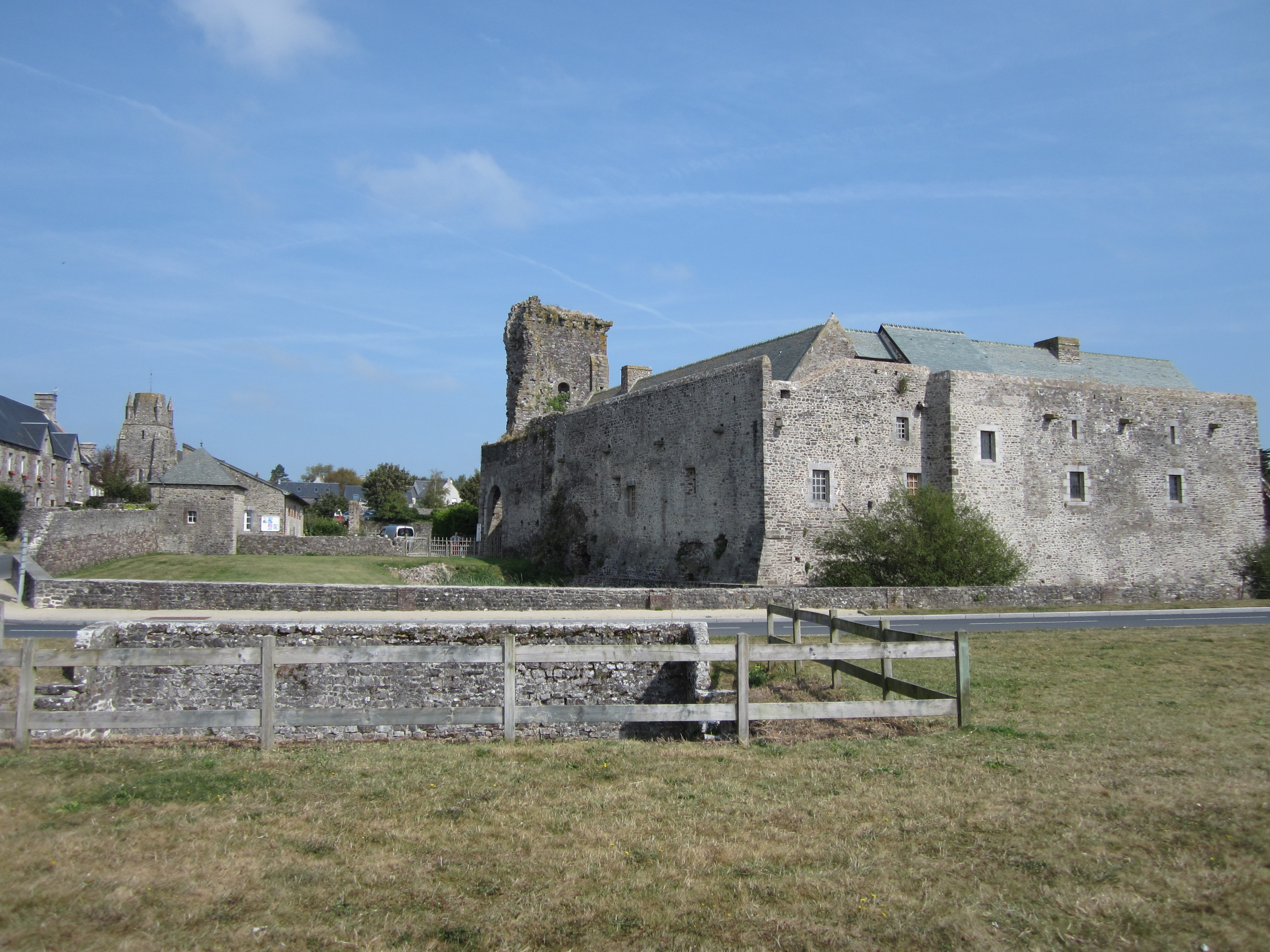
- The church, the tidal lavoir, and the castle (L to R)
- Location of Regnéville-sur-Mer
- Location within France Location within Normandy
- Coordinates: 49°01′20″N 1°32′26″W
- Country: France
- Region: Normandy
- Department: Manche
- Arrondissement: Coutances
- Canton: Coutances
- Intercommunality: Coutances Mer et Bocage

Government
  - Mayor (2020–2026): Martial Salvi
- Area^{1}: 8.50 km^{2} (3.28 sq mi)
- Elevation: 10 m (33 ft)
- Highest elevation: 43 m (141 ft)
- Lowest elevation: 5 m (16 ft)
- Population (2023): 730
  - Density: 86/km^{2} (220/sq mi)
- Time zone: UTC+01:00 (CET)
  - Summer (DST): UTC+02:00 (CEST)
- INSEE/Postal code: 50429 /50590
- ^{1} French Land Register data, which excludes lakes, ponds, glaciers > 1 km^{2} (0.386 sq mi or 247 acres) and river estuaries.

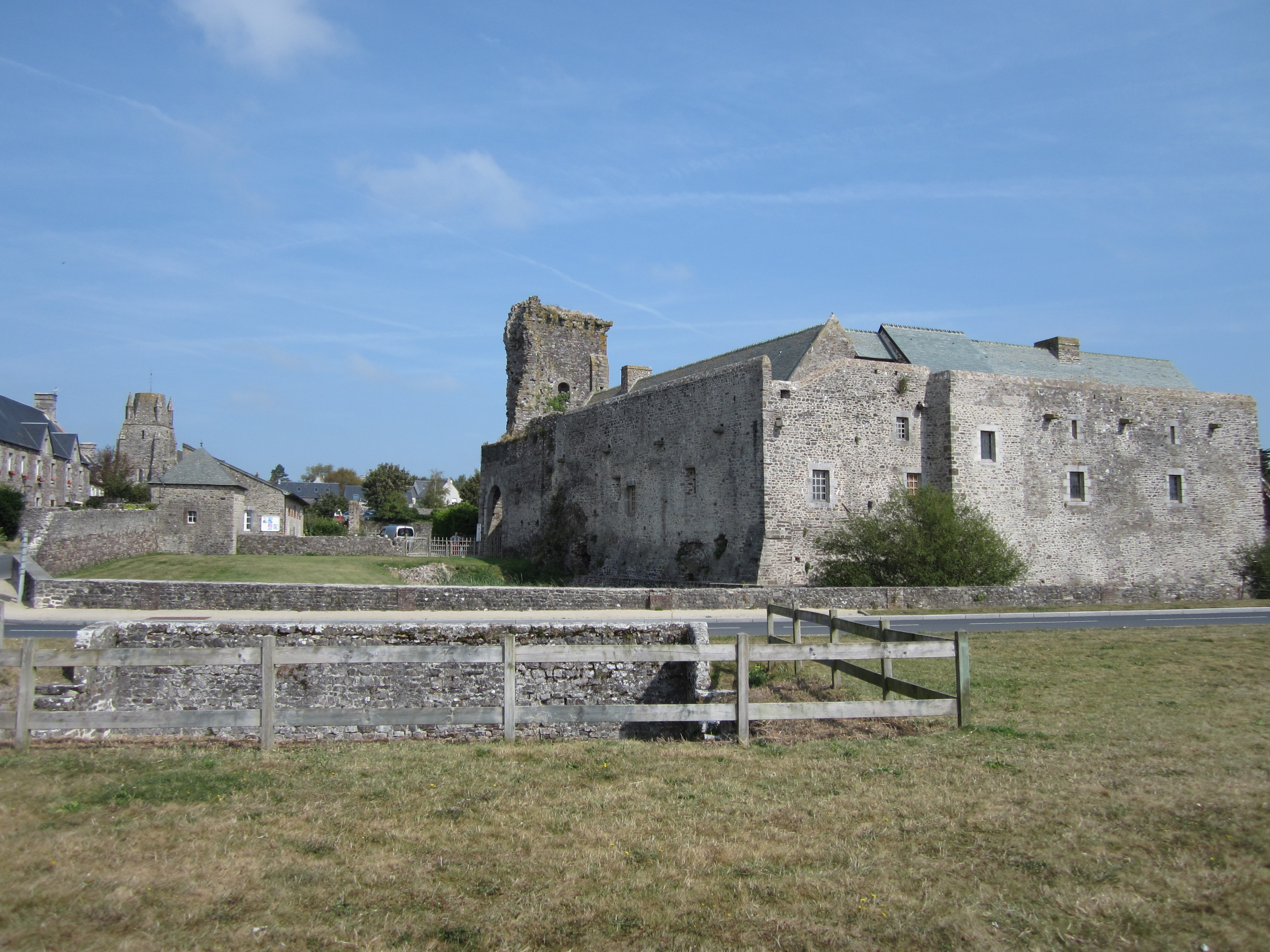
The church, the castle, and the tidal lavoir at Regnéville-sur-Mer

Regnéville-sur-Mer (French pronunciation: [ʁəɲevil syʁ mɛʁ], lit. 'Regnéville on Sea') is a commune in the Manche department in Normandy in north-western France.

== See also ==
- Château de Regnéville
- Phare de la pointe d'Agon - Pointe d'Agon Lighthouse
- Les Fours à Chaux du Rey - Lime Kilns and Maritime Museum, Regnéville
- Regnéville-sur-Mer official webpage
- Communes of the Manche department
