= Seine River (disambiguation) =

The Seine is a river in France.

Seine River may also refer to:

Rivers

- Seine River (Ontario)
- Seine River (Manitoba)
- St. Marys River (Florida–Georgia), named the Seine River in 1652 by French explorer Jean Ribault, later renamed by the Spanish.

Other uses

- Seine River (electoral district), a provincial electoral district in Manitoba
- Seine River First Nation, an Ojibwe nation in Ontario
