= Tour des Archives =

Keep of a former castle in France

Coordinates: 49°05′40″N 1°29′03″E

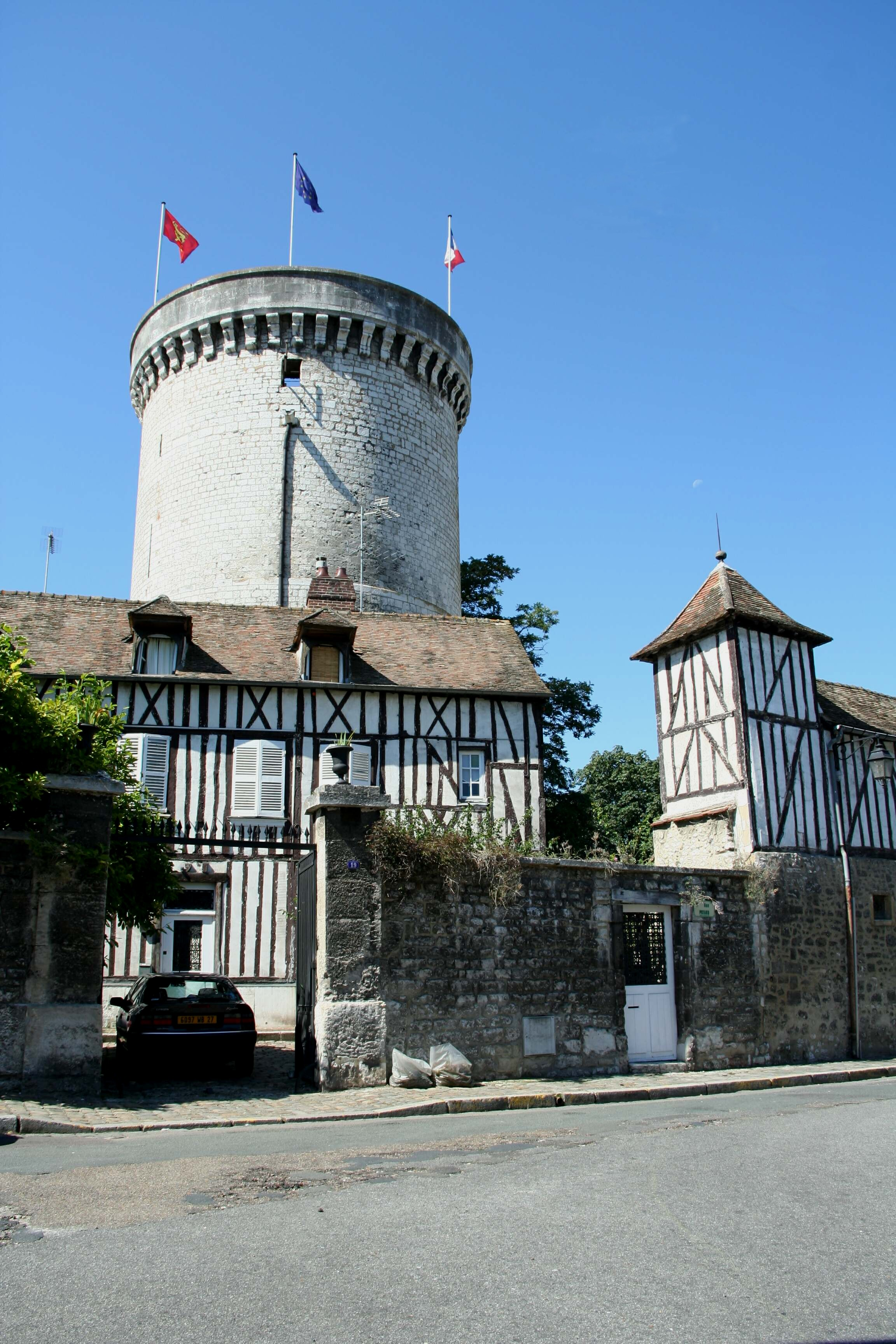
Tour des Archives in Vernon, France

The Tour des Archives is the keep of a former castle in the commune of Vernon in the Eure département of France.

Its origin dates to 1123, built by King Henry I of England, the son of William the Conqueror. It is 22m high and is a rare existing example of a round tower in Normandy, like the so-called tour Jeanne d'Arc (Joan of Arc Tower) of the former Rouen Castle.

The Tour des Archives has been classified since 1840 as a monument historique by the French Ministry of Culture.

== See also ==
- List of castles in France
