= Château d'Arques-la-Bataille =

French castle

Coordinates: 49°52′36″N 1°07′38″E

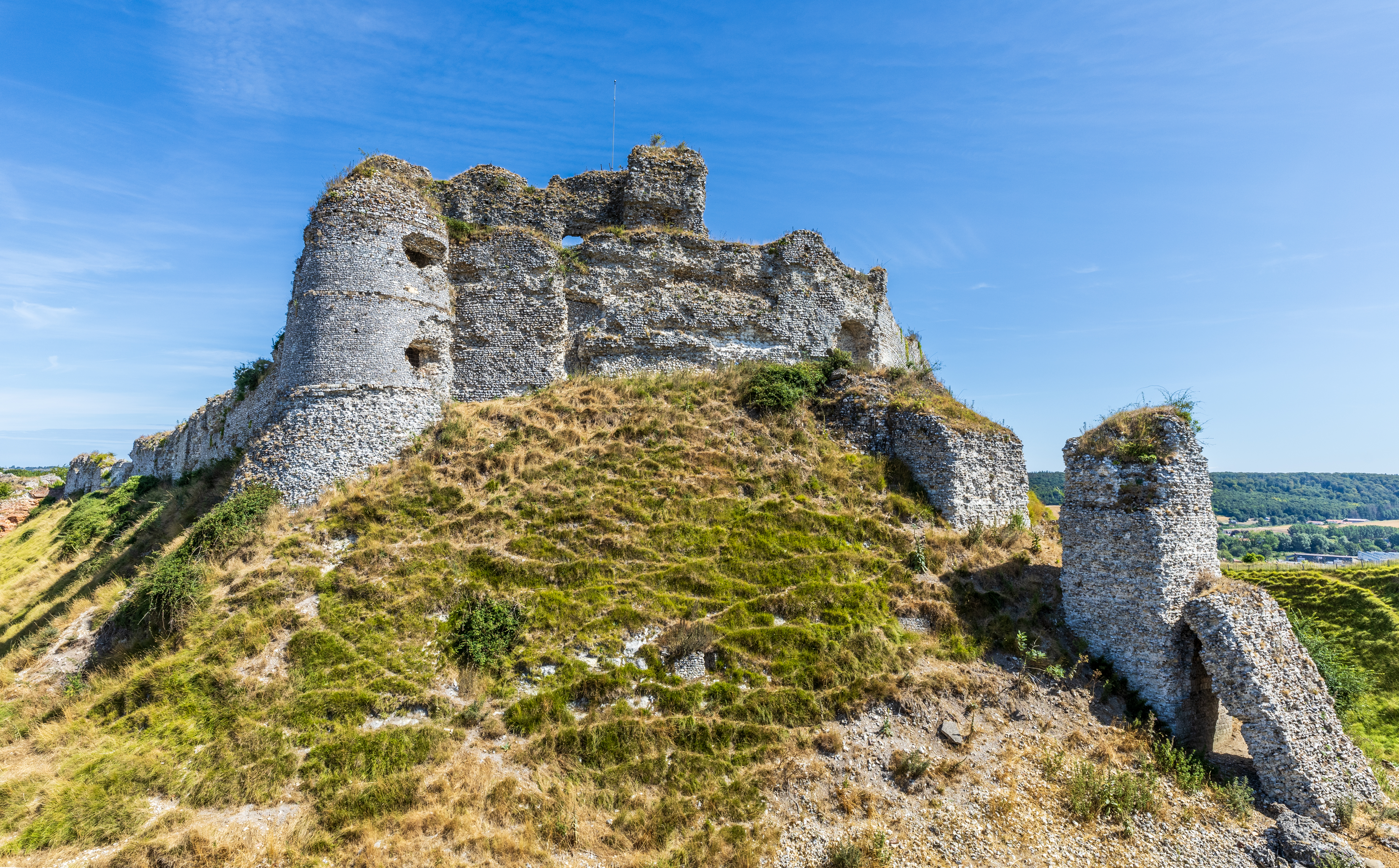

The Château d'Arques-la-Bataille is a 12th-century castle in the commune of Arques-la-Bataille in the Seine-Maritime département of France.

The castle is owned by the state. It has been listed since 1875 as a monument historique by the French Ministry of Culture.

== See also ==
- List of castles in France
