= Bricqueville-la-Blouette =

- Commune
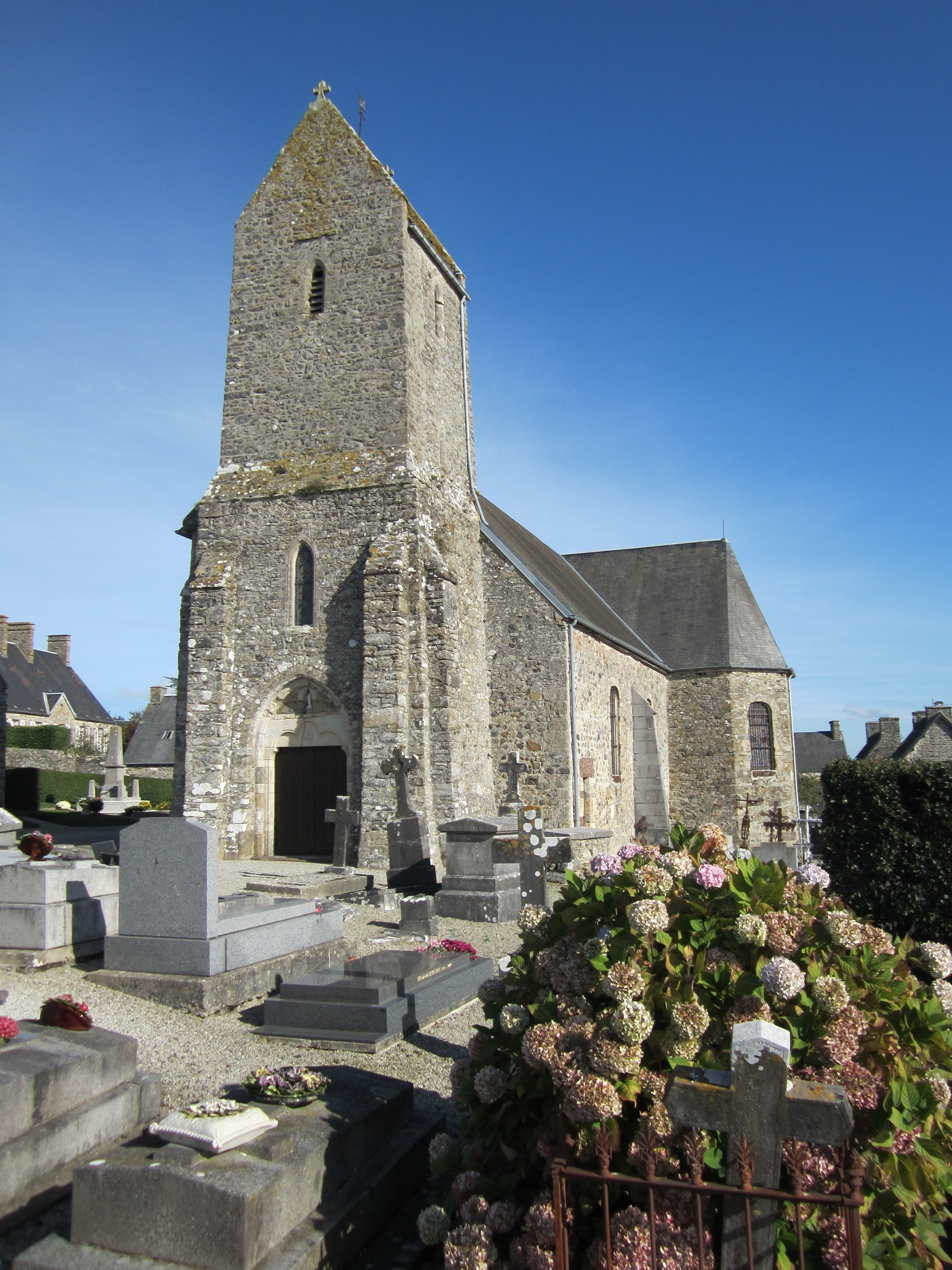
- The church of Saint-Martin
- Location of Bricqueville-la-Blouette
- Location within France Location within Normandy
- Coordinates: 49°02′06″N 1°28′38″W
- Country: France
- Region: Normandy
- Department: Manche
- Arrondissement: Coutances
- Canton: Coutances
- Intercommunality: Coutances Mer et Bocage

Government
  - Mayor (2020–2026): Rodolphe Jardin
- Area^{1}: 6.25 km^{2} (2.41 sq mi)
- Elevation: 69 m (226 ft)
- Highest elevation: 96 m (315 ft)
- Lowest elevation: 5 m (16 ft)
- Population (2023): 530
  - Density: 85/km^{2} (220/sq mi)
- Time zone: UTC+01:00 (CET)
  - Summer (DST): UTC+02:00 (CEST)
- INSEE/Postal code: 50084 /50200
- ^{1} French Land Register data, which excludes lakes, ponds, glaciers > 1 km^{2} (0.386 sq mi or 247 acres) and river estuaries.

Bricqueville-la-Blouette (French pronunciation: [bʁikvil la blwɛt]) is a commune in the Manche department in Normandy in northwestern France.

== Population ==
Historical population
Year	Pop.	±% p.a.
1968	300	—
1975	321	+0.97%
1982	442	+4.68%
1990	525	+2.17%
1999	540	+0.31%
2007	528	−0.28%
2012	563	+1.29%
2017	554	−0.32%
2023	530	−0.74%
Source: INSEE

== See also ==
- Communes of the Manche department
