= Tourville-sur-Sienne =

- Commune
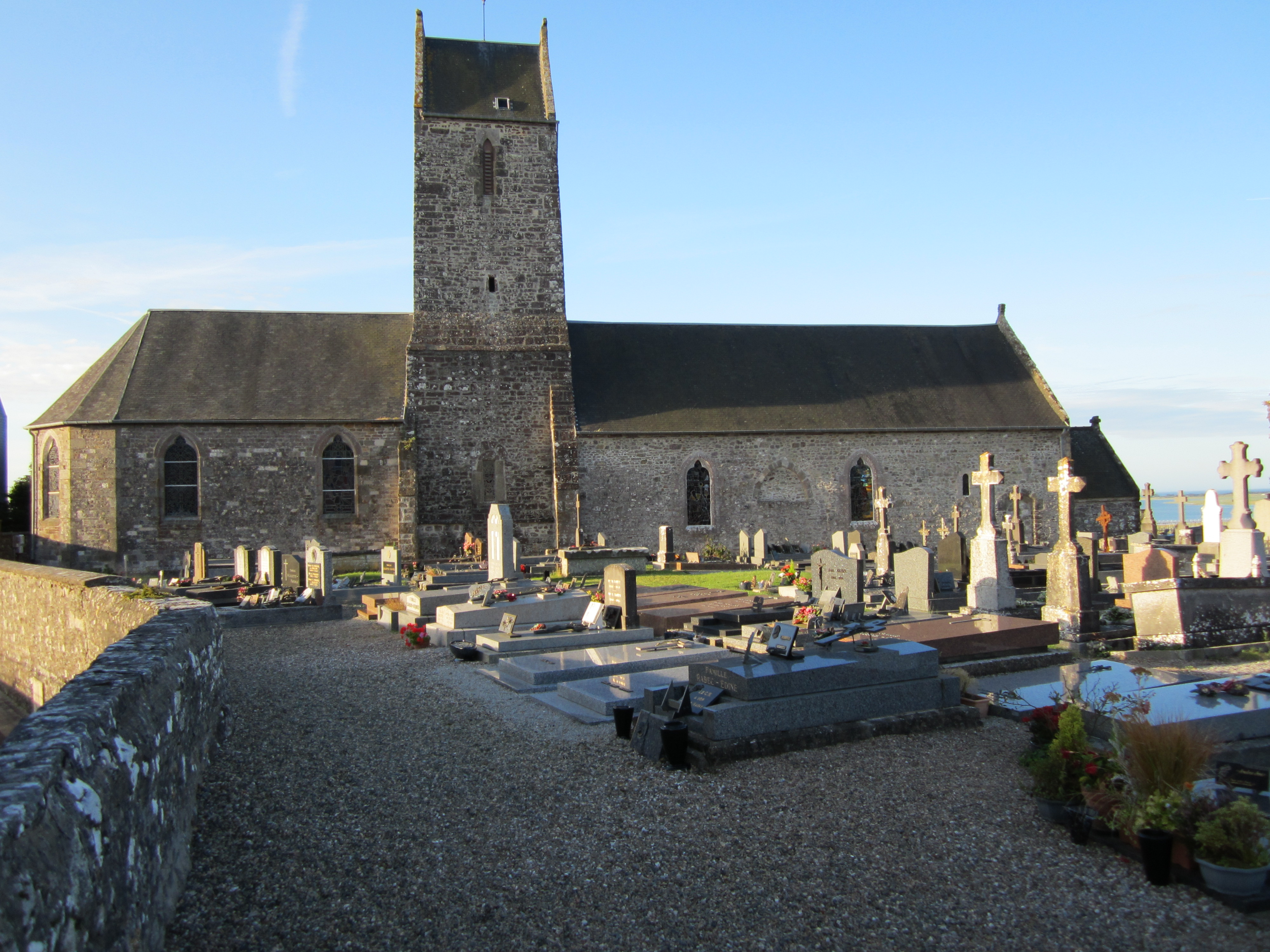
- The church of Notre-Dame
- Location of Tourville-sur-Sienne
- Location within France Location within Normandy
- Coordinates: 49°02′49″N 1°32′34″W
- Country: France
- Region: Normandy
- Department: Manche
- Arrondissement: Coutances
- Canton: Coutances

Government
  - Mayor (2020–2026): Pierre Vogt
- Area^{1}: 7.50 km^{2} (2.90 sq mi)
- Elevation: 61 m (200 ft)
- Highest elevation: 103 m (338 ft)
- Lowest elevation: 5 m (16 ft)
- Population (2023): 787
  - Density: 105/km^{2} (272/sq mi)
- Demonym: Tourvillais
- Time zone: UTC+01:00 (CET)
  - Summer (DST): UTC+02:00 (CEST)
- INSEE/Postal code: 50603 /50200
- ^{1} French Land Register data, which excludes lakes, ponds, glaciers > 1 km^{2} (0.386 sq mi or 247 acres) and river estuaries.

Tourville-sur-Sienne (French pronunciation: [tuʁvil syʁ sjɛn]) is a commune in the Manche department in Normandy in north-western France.

== See also ==
- Communes of the Manche department
