= Heugueville-sur-Sienne =

- Commune
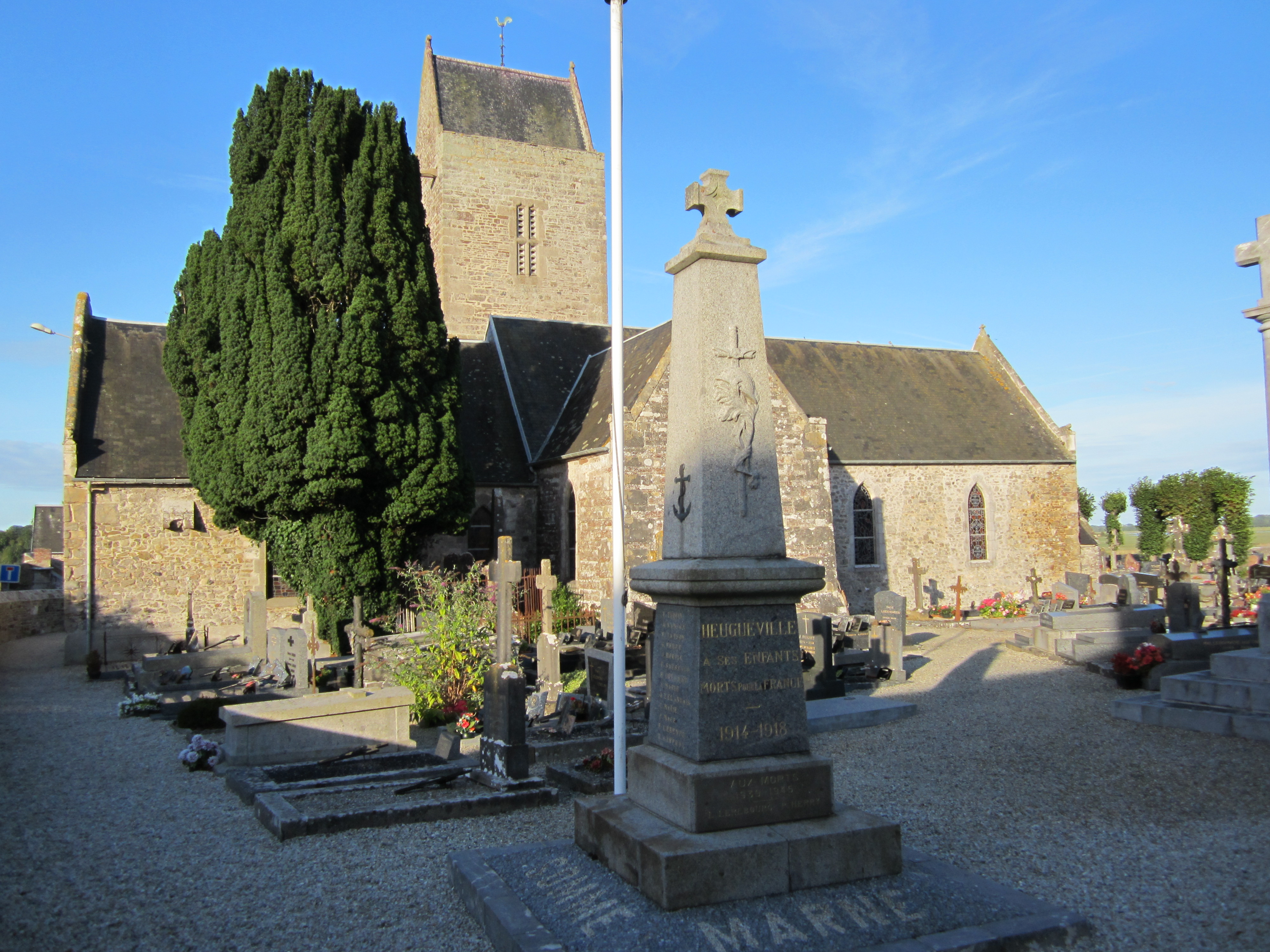
- The church of Saint-Pierre
- Location of Heugueville-sur-Sienne
- Location within France Location within Normandy
- Coordinates: 49°02′10″N 1°31′23″W
- Country: France
- Region: Normandy
- Department: Manche
- Arrondissement: Coutances
- Canton: Coutances

Government
  - Mayor (2020–2026): Richard Macé
- Area^{1}: 5.88 km^{2} (2.27 sq mi)
- Elevation: 15 m (49 ft)
- Highest elevation: 89 m (292 ft)
- Lowest elevation: 5 m (16 ft)
- Population (2023): 458
  - Density: 77.9/km^{2} (202/sq mi)
- Time zone: UTC+01:00 (CET)
  - Summer (DST): UTC+02:00 (CEST)
- INSEE/Postal code: 50243 /50200
- ^{1} French Land Register data, which excludes lakes, ponds, glaciers > 1 km^{2} (0.386 sq mi or 247 acres) and river estuaries.

Heugueville-sur-Sienne is a commune in the Manche department in northwestern France.

== See also ==
- Communes of the Manche department
