= Château des Tourelles =

Castle in Vernon, Eure, France

Coordinates: 49°5′53″N 1°29′19″E

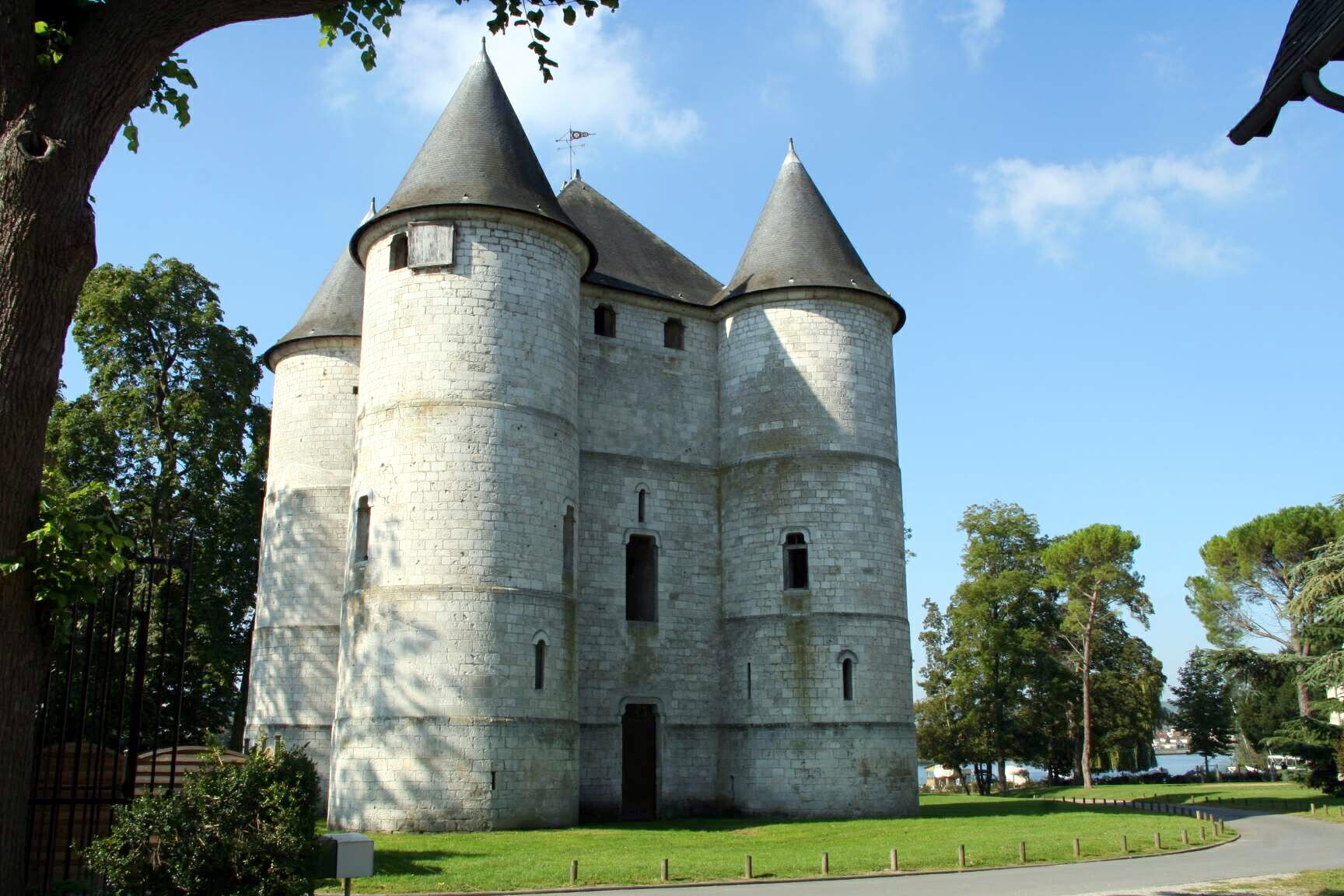
Château des Tourelles

The Château des Tourelles is a castle in the commune of Vernon in the Eure département of France.

The castle originated in 1196, when Philippe Auguste (Philip II of France), fighting against the king of England, Richard the Lionheart, for possession of Normandy, seized Vernon and made the town a military base.

The castle consists of a square tower surrounded by four round turrets, the whole edifice rising to a height of twenty metres.

It is one of the few castles in France which has been practically unchanged for 800 years. The property of the commune since 1955, it has been listed since 1945 as a monument historique by the French Ministry of Culture.

== See also ==
- List of castles in France
